= List of California College of the Arts people =

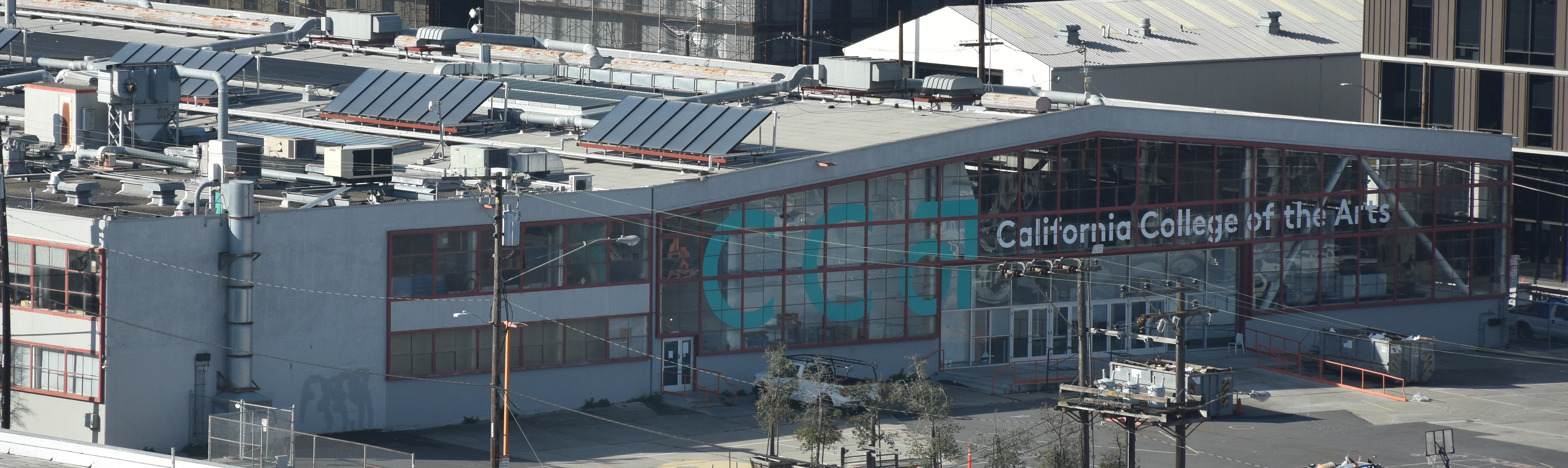
California College of the Arts (2019), San Francisco campus

This is a list of notable people from the California College of the Arts, which was formerly known as School of the California Guild of Arts and Crafts (1907–1908), California School of Arts and Crafts (1908–1935), and California College of Arts and Crafts (1936–2002).

== Notable alumni ==
=== Academia ===
- Sonia Landy Sheridan (MFA 1961), professor emeritus at the School of the Art Institute of Chicago (SAIC)
- Hulleah Tsinhnahjinnie (BFA 1981, painting), educator at UC Davis

=== Artists ===
==== Ceramics ====
- Robert Arneson (MFA 1958)
- Viola Frey (BFA 1956), ceramics
- Manuel Neri (attended in the 1950s), ceramics
- Peter Voulkos (MFA in the 1950s), ceramics

==== Film ====
- Ako Castuera (BFA 2000, illustration), storyboard art on Adventure Time
- Hong Sang-soo (BFA, attended in the 1980s), South Korean film director and screenwriter
- Audrey Marrs (MA 2008, curatorial practice), Oscar-winning filmmaker, and co-founder of Ladyfest
- Wayne Wang (attended in the mid-1970s), film director

==== Painting ====
- Natalia Anciso (MFA 2011, painting), Chicana–Tejana contemporary artist and educator
- Robert Bechtle (BFA 1954, interdisciplinary design; MFA 1958, painting), photorealist painter, printmaker, and educator
- Clifford Beck (BFA 1968), Navajo American painter, illustrator, photographer and educator
- Henrietta Berk (attended 1955–1959), painter
- David Bierk (attended c. 1970), American–Canadian realist painter
- Bernice Bing (BFA, attended in 1958), Chinese American lesbian artist and painter
- Val Britton (MFA 2006), painter, printmaker, collagist, known for works on paper and installation art
- Squeak Carnwath (MFA 1977), painter and educator
- Geoffrey Chadsey (MFA 1996, photography), painter and drawer
- Jules de Balincourt (BFA 1998), painter
- Albert Dolmans (BFA), Dutch painter
- Warren Leopold (attended c. 1939), architect, painter and craftsman
- Jake Longstreth (MFA 2005), painter, musician, and internet radio personality
- Louis Macouillard (BFA 1934), watercolorist, and illustrator
- Bruce McGaw (BFA 1957), painter, professor emeritus of the San Francisco Art Institute
- Richard McLean (BFA 1958, painting), photorealist painter
- George Miyasaki (BFA 1957, BAEd 1957, MFA 1958), Japanese–American abstract expressionist painter, educator
- Robert S. Neuman (MFA 1951, painting), abstract painter, printmaker, educator
- Toyin Ojih Odutola (MFA 2012), Nigerian-born American contemporary visual artist
- Nathan Oliveira (BFA 1951, MFA 1952), painter, printmaker, sculptor, professor
- Suzanne Scheuer (BFA, attended in 1910s), painter, muralist
- M. Louise Stanley (BFA 1967, MFA 1969), figurative painter
- Don Stivers (attended in the 1940s), military painter, commercial illustrator
- James Torlakson (BFA 1973), photorealist oil painter, printmaker, professor
- Lee Weiss (attended 1946–1947), watercolorist

==== Photography ====
- Penny Dhaemers (BFA), photographer and first female chair of the UC Berkeley Department of Design
- Beatrice Helg (BFA photo), Swiss photographer
- Todd Hido (MFA 1996, photo), photographer, educator
- Jim Ricks (BFA 2002, photo), conceptual artist, curator
- Hank Willis Thomas (MFA 2004, photo; MA, visual criticism), conceptual artist with themes related to identity, and history
- Hulleah Tsinhnahjinnie (BFA 1981, painting and photo), Seminole-Muscogee-Navajo photographer, museum director, curator, and professor

==== Printmaking ====
- Jesus Barraza (MFA 2016, social practice; MA, visual criticism), printmaker and graphic artist
- Liliana Gramberg (attended in 1950), Italian-born American printmaker and painter
- Margo Humphrey (BFA, printmaking), printmaker, illustrator, art teacher
- Roland Petersen (attended 1952–1954), Danish-born American painter and printmaker
- James Torlakson (BFA 1973), photorealist oil painter, printmaker, professor

==== Illustration and comics ====
- Sean Aaberg (attended), comics artist, illustrator, and magazine editor; co-founder of Nonchalance and Oaklandish
- Trinidad Escobar (MFA), author, poet, cartoonist, educator
- Tomie de Paola (MFA 1969, illustration)
- Mehedi Haque, Bengali cartoonist, editor
- Chelsea Martin (BFA 2008, illustration)
- Mike Mignola (BFA 1982, illustration), comic artist, writer
- Jey Parks (MFA, illustration), also known as Jenny Parks, comics artist, fan artist, and scientific illustrator

==== Mixed media ====
- Harrell Fletcher (MFA 1994), social practice artist, educator
- Bryan Nash Gill (MFA 1988), sculpture
- Ana María Hernando (BFA 1990), Argentine installation artist, fiber artist
- David Ireland (BFA 1953, industrial design), sculptor, conceptual artist, minimalist architect
- C. Carl Jennings (attended in the 1930s), blacksmith and metalsmith, founding member of the California Blacksmith Association (CBA)
- Susan O'Malley (MFA 2006, social practice), graphic artist, public art, curator, and author
- Dennis Oppenheim (BFA mid-1960s), conceptual artist, performance artist, earth artist, sculptor and photographer
- Raymond Saunders (MFA 1961), multimedia painter, educator
- Hank Willis Thomas (MFA 2004, photo; MA, visual criticism), conceptual artist with themes related to identity, and history

==== Musicians ====
- Richard Waters (MFA 1965), painter, inventor of the waterphone musical instrument
- Hsiung-Zee Wong (1972, industrial design), multimedia composer, musician, illustrator, designer

==== Sculpture and glass ====
- Kate Ali (BFA 2007), sculptor, educator
- Nicole Chesney (attended 1992–1994), metalsmith and glass artist; known for large-scale architectural work
- Viola Frey (BFA 1956), sculptor, painter, educator
- Bryan Nash Gill (MFA 1988), wood sculptor, relief printmaker
- Bob Haozous (BFA 1971, sculpture), Chiricahua Apache sculptor
- Dorothy Rieber Joralemon (attended in the 1930s), abstract sculptor, children's portrait artist, and writer
- Benjamin Moore (BFA, 1974), glass artist, teacher
- Jerome Ranft (BFA 1991), character sculptor and voice actor for Pixar Animation Studios
- Sam Richardson, post-war sculptor, painter, and printmaker
- Adrien Segal (BFA 2007, furniture design), sculptor; known for sculptures designed with data

=== Designers ===
- Erik Adigard (BFA 1987, graphic design), Congolese-born French and American graphic designer, multimedia artist, educator
- Agnes Chavez (BFA 1984), entrepreneur, designer, and educational tools
- Roger C. Field (BFA 1968, industrial design), British inventor of the Foldaxe folding electric guitar
- Tracy Krumm (BFA 1987), textile artist
- Jim Parkinson (BFA 1963), lettering artist
- Florence Resnikoff (BFA 1967, jewelry), metal and jewelry designer
- Kay Sekimachi (BFA 1949, textile), fiber artist
- Dan Stiles (BFA, attended in 1990s), graphic designer, rock music poster designer
- Michael Vanderbyl (BFA 1968), graphic designer

=== Writers ===
- Kate Colby (MFA, writing), poet and essayist
- Wendy Anderson Halperin (attended 1979–1980), children's book author and illustrator
- Joseph del Pesco (MA 2005, curatorial practice), art curator and arts writer; director of Kadist
- Tessa Rumsey (MA 2002, visual and critical studies), poet
- Amy Schwartz (BFA 1976, drawing), children's book author and illustrator
- Maximilian Uriarte (BFA 2013), comic book author, topical on U.S. Marines and military service

== Notable current and past faculty ==
Listed noted faculty both past and present, in alphabetical order by department and last name.

=== Curators and museum studies ===
- Jens Hoffmann, director of the CCA's Wattis Institute for Contemporary Arts 2007–2012
- Renny Pritikin, curator, museum professional, writer, poet, and educator

=== Designers ===
- Yves Béhar, industrial designer, professor, and head of the industrial design department 2005–2012
- Brenda Laurel, video game developer, pioneer of VR, professor and chair of graduate design program 2006–2012
- Christopher Simmons (attended in the 1990s), Canadian-born graphic designer, design leader, and former graphic design professor
- Florence Resnikoff, jewelry designer, professor of jewelry and metal arts 1973–1980
- Lucille Tenazas, graphic designer
- Michael Vanderbyl, former faculty 1973–2014, and dean of design department 1986–2002
- Sandra Vivanco, former professor in the architecture division, and critical ethnic studies program

=== Film ===
- Rob Epstein, film director, producer, writer and editor; co-chair of the film program
- Kota Ezawa, Japanese-German and American abstracted computer animation artist; associate professor of film and fine arts
- Jeanne C. Finley, filmmaker, photographer, and video artist; professor of graduate fine arts
- JoAnn Gillerman, video, new media and performance artist; professor film program
- Lynn Marie Kirby, professor of graduate and undergraduate fine arts, film and interdisciplinary studies

=== Painting ===
- Kim Anno, abstract painter, photographer, and filmmaker; professor since 1996 and as the chair of the painting department
- Helen Breger, sculptor, illustrator, printmaker; drawing instructor 1959–1988
- Richard Diebenkorn, painter and printmaker; professor 1955–1958
- Linda Geary, professor of painting 2006–present
- George Albert Harris, painter, muralist, professor of art 1946–1947
- Saburo Hasegawa, Japanese calligrapher, abstract painter, professor 1955–1957
- David Huffman, painter, undergraduate painting and drawing
- Xavier Martínez, painting and drawing 1908–1943
- Alicia McCarthy, painter
- Arthur Okamura, painter, printmaker; professor emeritus, taught painting 1967–1997
- Frederick Olmsted Jr., painter, muralist; taught in the 1940s
- Carole Doyle Peel, painter, professor emerita who taught painting 1968–2014
- Maria Porges, professor of graduate fine arts in the 1990s and 2000s
- Raymond Saunders (MFA 1961), multimedia painter, former professor of painting
- Elizabeth Sher, video artist, and artist books; taught painting and media art 1979–2011
- Mary Snowden, painter, taught in the 1970s, professor emeritus in painting and drawing
- Taravat Talepasand, former adjunct painting professor in the 2010s
- Vaclav Vytlacil, painting professor in the 1930s and 1940s

=== Photography ===
- Tammy Rae Carland, dean of fine arts and professor
- Susan Ciriclio, photographer, professor emeritus of photography 1988–2017
- Jim Goldberg, photographer, professor emeritus of photography 1987–2014
- Todd Hido (MFA 1996, photo), photographer, photography professor
- Larry Sultan, photographer, professor emeritus of photography 1989–2009

=== Printmaking ===
- Nance O'Banion, professor emeritus in printmaking, taught 1974–2016

=== Sculpture and glass ===
- William Victor Bragdon, established Berkeley's first art pottery company California Faience
- Harry Dixon, metalworker, jeweler, sculptor
- Bella Feldman, sculptor
- Linda Fleming, sculptor; large-scale wood and metal works
- Viola Frey (BFA 1956), professor emerita, ceramics teacher 1965–1999
- Marvin Lipofsky, founder of the glass department
- Adrien Segal (BFA 2007, furniture design), known for sculptures designed with data; adjunct professor of furniture design
- Nancy Selvin, sculptor
- Chauncey R. Thomas, established Berkeley's first art pottery company California Faience

=== Social practice ===
- Ted Purves, chair of Social Practice graduate program

=== Textiles ===
- Lia Cook, textile designer, professor of textiles
- Josh Faught, fiber artist, associate professor and chair of the textiles department
- Trude Guermonprez, professor and chair of the crafts department, starting 1954

=== Writers ===
- Opal Palmer Adisa, Jamaican-born American poet, novelist, and performance artist; professor emeritus in writing and diversity studies 1993–2017
- Tom Barbash, writer, critic; professor in the MFA writing program
- Dodie Bellamy, novelist, journalist; professor of creative writing
- Bill Berkson, poet, critic; taught art criticism in 1983
- Jasmin Darznik, Iranian-born American novelist; associate professor of creative writing
- Sarah Webster Fabio, poet, literary critic; taught 1968–1970
- Gloria Frym, poet, fiction writer, essayist; taught graduate writing since 2002
- Kevin Killian, queer poet, author, editor, playwright; taught graduate writing
- Michael McClure, poet, playwright, songwriter, novelist; taught poetry
- Aimee Phan, novelist, of Vietnamese descent; taught writing and literature
- Lisa Robertson, Canadian poet, essayist, translator; taught 2007–2010
- Mitchell Schwarzer, architect; professor emeritus, co-founded the school's masters program in visual criticism (now called visual and critical studies)

== Presidents ==
1. Frederick Meyer (1907–1944)
2. Spencer Macky (1944–1954)
3. Daniel S. Defenbacher (1954–1957)
4. Joseph A. Danysh (acting; 1957–1959)
5. Henry X. Ford (1960–c. 1985)
6. Neil Hoffman (1985–1994)
7. Lorne Michael Buchman (1994–1999)
8. Michael S. Roth (2000–2007)
9. Stephen Beal (2008–2023)
10. David C. Howse (2023–present)

== See also ==
- List of San Francisco Art Institute people
