= Leslie Shows =

American artist (born 1977)

- Born: 1977 (age 48–49); Manteca, California, U.S.
- Known for: Painting
- Website: www.leslieshows.com

Leslie Shows (born 1977) is an American artist, who is recognized for expanding the boundaries of landscape painting.

== Early life and education ==
Leslie Shows was born in 1977 in Manteca, California. Her childhood in Juneau, Alaska had an intense impact on the work she would create as an adult. She received her B.F.A. degree in 1999 from the San Francisco Art Institute (SFAI), and earned her M.F.A. degree from the California College of the Arts (CCA) in 2006.

== Work ==
Shows' earlier works were mixed-media collages depicting abstracted landscapes. Her more recent paintings, while retaining the use of mixed media, have become more abstracted and focus on mineral textures and geologic features. Her work is included in the collection at San Francisco Museum of Modern Art.

== Awards and residencies ==
- 2012 International Studio and Curatorial Program, Artadia New York Residency
- 2011 Bemis Center for the Arts
- 2010 Millay Colony for the Arts
- 2009 Artadia Award
- 2008 Eureka Fellowship, Fleishhacker Foundation
- 2007 Printmaking Fellowship, Kala Art Institute
- 2006 SECA Art Award, San Francisco Museum of Modern Art
- 2006 Tournesol Award, Headlands Center for the Arts

== Solo exhibitions ==
- Surfacing, Scottsdale Museum of Contemporary Art, Scottsdale, Arizona (2014)
- Leslie Shows, Bemis Center for Contemporary Arts, Omaha, Nebraska (2012)
- Split Array, Haines Gallery, San Francisco, California (2011)
- Five Grounds, Jack Hanley Gallery, New York, New York (2010)
- The New Dust, Jack Hanley Gallery, New York, New York (2008)
- Carbon Freeze, Jack Hanley Gallery, Los Angeles, California (2006)
- International Parks, Jack Hanley Gallery, San Francisco, California (2005)
