= Andrea Higgins =

American painter

- Education: Dartmouth College
- Alma mater: San Francisco Art Institute
- Known for: Painting
- Awards: SECA Art Award; 2002

Andrea Higgins is an American painter.

== Early life and education ==
She grew up in Kansas City, received a Bachelor of Arts from Dartmouth College, and received a Master of Fine Arts from the San Francisco Art Institute.

== Career ==
Her paintings include geometric patterns that resemble textiles, based on her experience at Britex Fabrics in San Francisco. The brushstrokes in her oil paintings mimic stitches in fabric. On a visit to Indonesia in 1995 she was inspired by the Hindu women's woven sarongs. She connected these women's fashion to the way that American first ladies dress, inspiring her show "The President's Wives." Her exhibitions have been inspired by characters in literature, including Babbitt and The Picture of Dorian Gray, and American politics, including Nancy Reagan. She received an Artadia Award in 2000 and the SECA Art Award in 2002 from the San Francisco Museum of Modern Art.

== Shows and works ==
- The Presidents' Wives (2002), San Francisco
- Appearance (2009), San Francisco
- Double Take (2013), San Francisco
