= Brian Gill =

Brian Gill may refer to:

- Brian Gill (cricketer) (born 1948), New Zealand cricketer
- Brian Gill (zoologist) (born 1953), former curator at Auckland Museum
- Brian Gill, Lord Gill (born 1942), Lord President and Lord Justice General and Scotland's longest serving judge
- B. J. Gill (Brian John Gill), Scottish advocate and Solicitor General for Scotland

== See also ==
- Bryan Nash Gill, American visual artist
- Bryan Gil, Spanish footballer
- Brayan Gil, Salvadoran footballer
