= Chanell Stone =

American photographer

- Born: 1992 (age 33–34); Los Angeles, California, United States
- Education: California College of the Arts, Los Angeles Trade-Technical College
- Known for: Photography
- Awards: 2020 Artist in Residence, Real Time and Space 2019–2020 Emerging Artist Award, Museum of the African Diaspora, San Francisco 2018–2019 Purchase Prize Award, Center for Photography at Woodstock
- Website: www.chanellstone.com

Chanell Stone is an American photographer. She is Black and known for her "Natura Negra" series. Stone lives and works in Oakland, California.

== Early life and education ==
She received an associate degree in English from Los Angeles Trade-Technical College in 2017. Stone received a BFA degree in photography from California College of the Arts in 2019.

== Work ==
Chanell Stone's work predominantly features black and white self-portraits. She first took an analog photography class in high school and continues to use film in her practice, primarily shooting with a Pentax.

Stone was a featured photographer in W Magazine's "These Are the 8 Young Photographers to Follow in 2020". She was also a shortlisted finalist for the 2020 San Francisco Artadia Award. She attributes her interest in representation and self-portraiture to growing up with social media, namely Myspace. Portrait photography continues to be her primary focus.

Her series "Natura Negra" explores the connection of black people and nature, specifically the nature that can be found in dense cities or what she refers to as "urban nature". This series sets out to reclaim and reconnect black people to nature, even if it is in an urban setting. Stone says, "As Black people, it feels like these rural spaces aren't for us. I want to turn that idea on its head." Stone also aims to dispel the problematic idea that Black people’s only connection to nature is through slavery. "Natura Negra" won her an emerging artist award from the Museum of the African Diaspora in San Francisco.

Stone has also worked as an editorial photographer for the California Sunday Magazine, documenting a family affected by the Camp Fire in Paradise, California in 2018.

For Black History Month in February 2021, Apple, Inc. commissioned 30 photographers to contribute to the Shot on iPhone campaign, "Hometown". Stone contributed pictures of Oakland, California that were featured on Apple's Instagram account as well as billboards around the San Francisco Bay Area.

== Awards and fellowships ==
Among the honors which Stone has earned are:

- 2026: SECA Art Award, San Francisco Museum of Modern Art (SFMOMA)
- 2020 Artist in Residence, Real Time and Space
- 2019–2020 Emerging Artist Award, Museum of the African Diaspora San Francisco
- 2018–2019 Purchase Prize Award, Center for Photography at Woodstock
- 2018–2019 Kate V. and Harry W. Davies Memorial Scholarship, California College of the Arts
- 2017–2019 Diversity Scholarship, California College of the Arts
- 2017–2019 Faculty Honors Scholarship, California College of the Arts

== Exhibitions ==
- Kala Art Institute, Berkeley, California, "Poetics of Conflict" (2018)
- Center for Photography at Woodstock, Woodstock, NY, "Photography Now" (2018)
- Ortega y Gasset Projects, Brooklyn, NY, "Vice Versa" (2018)
- Aperture Foundation, New York, NY, "Aperture Summer Open: Delirious Cities” (2019)
- SF Camerawork, San Francisco, CA, "Forecast" (2019)
- Hit Gallery, San Francisco, CA, "Brass Tacks" (2019)
- Berkeley Art Center, Berkeley, CA "Experiments in the Field: Creative Collaboration in the Age of Ecological Concern” (2020)
- Museum of the African Diaspora, San Francisco, CA, "Natura Negra" (2020)
- Apple, Inc., Shot on iPhone, "Hometown" (2021)

== Collections ==
Stone's work is held in the following permanent collections:

- Center for Photography at Woodstock, Woodstock, New York
- Meyer Library: Artist Book Collection, Oakland, California
