= Faught =

Faught is a surname. Notable people with the name include:

- Bob Faught (1921–2002), American basketball player
- George Faught (born 1962), American businessman and politician
- Howard E. Faught (1907–1955), American politician and jurist
- Josh Faught (born 1979), American artist
