= CrossLypka =

American artist duo

CrossLypka is an American artist duo consisting of Tyler Cross (born 1992) and Kyle Lypka (born 1987). Based in Oakland, California, the pair are known for collaborative sculptural works in ceramic and mixed media that explore symmetry, repetition, material process, and shared authorship.

In 2026, CrossLypka was awarded the SECA Art Award by the San Francisco Museum of Modern Art (SFMOMA).

== Background ==
CrossLypka was formed by artists Tyler Cross and Kyle Lypka, who live and work in Oakland, California. The duo works collaboratively on sculptures that are produced through an ongoing exchange between the two artists. Their practice has focused primarily on ceramic sculpture, creating both freestanding and wall-mounted works.

== Work ==
CrossLypka's sculptures often employ mirrored forms, bilateral compositions, and repeated motifs. Critics and curators have noted the role of collaboration within their practice, with the works reflecting a process of negotiation and shared decision-making between the two artists.

Writing for KQED, Sarah Hotchkiss described the duo's sculptures as the result of a "back-and-forth process" in which the artists pass works between one another during production. She noted references in the work to architectural ornament, mirrored imagery, and variations in texture and glaze.

== Career ==
CrossLypka first exhibited together in the San Francisco Bay Area in the early 2020s. Selected solo exhibitions include I Surrender at pt.2 Gallery, Oakland (2020), Gravity Corner at Blunk Space, Point Reyes (2022), Tarantula at House of Seiko, San Francisco (2024), 00 at april april, Pittsburgh (2025), In the Opening at Chris Sharp Gallery, Los Angeles (2025), and Sport at Bureau, New York (2026).

The duo has also participated in group exhibitions at venues including Berkeley Art Center, Marin Museum of Contemporary Art, Anthony Meier, KADIST, and Galerie Greta Meert.

=== 2026 SECA Art Award ===
In April 2026, SFMOMA announced CrossLypka as one of three recipients of the museum's 2026 SECA Art Award, alongside Em Kettner and Chanell Stone. The award recognizes Bay Area artists whose work has not yet received substantial institutional recognition. An exhibition of the awardees' work is scheduled to be presented at SFMOMA from December 2026 through May 2027.

== Collections ==
Works by CrossLypka are held in the collections of the Berkeley Art Museum and Pacific Film Archive and KADIST.
