= Colter Jacobsen =

American painter (born 1975)

Colter Jacobsen (born 1975) is an American artist based in San Francisco. His work includes drawings, paintings and installations.

== Life ==
Jacobsen was born in Ramona, California and had a Mormon upbringing there. He later moved to San Francisco and studied at the San Francisco Art Institute. He has worked as a care-giver for the blind and disabled.

== Work ==
For the San Francisco group show "17 Reasons" (2003) he draped a public bronze commemorative tablet with packing boxes and fruit crates, altered with paint, glue, collage, watercolors, and pencil. Matthew Higgs, another participant in the exhibition, invited him to stage an installation at White Columns in New York City. His White Columns exhibition in 2005 consisted of cardboard signs and labels, a clock, photographs and drawings based on photographs.

His pencil drawings and watercolor paintings are based on found snapshots. He makes two versions. The first is an exact rendering of the image, and the second is drawn from memory. The artist describes his subject as the way "the dream of memory gets watered down and changes".

He was selected as a 2010 SECA Art Award winner for the San Francisco Museum of Modern Art, along with Mauricio Ancalmo, Ruth Laskey, and Kamau Amu Patton.

Jacobsen is represented by Corvi Mora in London and Gallery Paule Anglim in San Francisco.
