= Ruth Laskey =

American artist

- Born: 1975 (age 50–51)
- Known for: Textile art, painting
- Website: www.ruthlaskey.com

Ruth Laskey is an American artist known for her Minimalist weavings and grid paintings.

== Biography ==
Laskey was born in San Luis Obispo, California in 1975. She graduated from the University of California, Santa Cruz in 1997 with a degree in Art History. She received a B.F.A. from the California College of Arts and Crafts in 1999 and an M.F.A. from the California College of the Arts in 2005.

As of 2015, Laskey lives in San Francisco.

== Work ==
Although Laskey has often grouped with fiber artists, her real contribution has been to the discussion of painting. Laskey came to weaving through painting. Beginning by making her own paints and weaving her own canvases, she started to paint individual threads that incorporate her designs into the canvas itself, calculating for color fades and interactions.

Laskey's weaving/paintings are created painstakingly, taking months to weave after first completing a planning stage of preliminary graph drawings. Laskey maintains rigorous control over the elements of her work—although she follows Minimalist methods of precise and orderly construction, her work is also predicated on the craft ethos of Modernist weavers like Anni Albers and Gunta Stölzl.

== Awards and honors ==
In 2016 Laskey won the Artadia Award. In 2010, she won the San Francisco Museum of Modern Art's SECA Art Award.

== Exhibitions ==
Laskey's solo exhibitions include:

- Quadrants, Capital Gallery, San Francisco, CA (2016)
- Ruth Laskey, Ratio 3, San Francisco, CA (2010)
- Six Weavings, Galerie Cinzia Friedlaender, Berlin Germany (2009)
- Song Song, Vienna, Austria (2008)
- 7 Weavings, Ratio 3, San Francisco, CA (2008)
- Disarticulate, Build Gallery, San Francisco, CA (2004)
- Familiars, California College of Arts and Crafts, Oakland, CA (1999)
- Recent Paintings, California College of Arts and Crafts, Oakland, CA (1999)

== Selected collections ==
- The Museum of Modern Art, San Francisco
