= John Beech (artist) =

British artist

John Beech is a British-American artist living and working in Brooklyn, New York.

== Life and work ==
John Beech was born in 1964 in Winchester, England. He moved to the United States at a young age and studied at the University of California, Berkeley, where he graduated with a Bachelor of Arts in 1986.

Beech's work across the fields of sculpture, painting, drawing and photography is defined by the use of humble materials such as rubber car floor mats, raw plywood, containers and other overlooked objects, reconfigured into painted and textured assemblages that draw attention to shape and scale. Beech is interested in "the object quality of things", in letting the form and materials demonstrate themselves. A relevant element in his work is his choice of materials. "I'm interested in fusing the visual vocabulary of utility and abstract art", Beech says. Ordinary objects such as dumpsters and patched subway platforms catch his eye and provide the basis for nuanced works of art.

Another aspect of Beech's work is his collection of more than six hundred Found-Photo Drawings. He selects the secondhand photos according to imagery or imperfections and alters them to extend and articulate a relation between photographic information and applied matter. Beech considers a piece complete when the photograph and drawing conjoin to become a resonant new entity, no longer tied to an historical moment.

Beech's work has been exhibited widely in the United States and Europe.

"Beech wants to jog us out of perceptual habit. His idiom is a poetics of normal wear and tear." –Kenneth Baker, San Francisco Chronicle

== Exhibitions ==
=== Solo ===
- 2017: "Silent Articles," Daniel Marzona, Berlin, Germany
- 2011: "The State of Things," Peter Blum, New York, NY
- 2005: "Recent Sculpture and Large Scale Drawings," Peter Blum, New York, NY

=== Group ===
- 2009: Art Unlimited 10, Art Basel 40, Basel, Switzerland
- 1995: "Painting outside Painting," The 44th Biennial Exhibition of Contemporary American Painting, Corcoran Gallery of Art, Washington, D.C.
- 1991: "Selections: San Francisco Bay Area," The Drawing Center, New York, NY

== Awards ==
- 1999: The Pollock-Krasner Foundation Award
- 1998: Chinati Foundation, Residency, Marfa, Texas
- 1992: SECA Art Award, San Francisco Museum of Modern Art
- 1985: Maybelle Toombs Award for Practice of Art, University of California, Berkeley

== Collections ==
- San Francisco Museum of Modern Art, San Francisco, California
- Albright–Knox Art Gallery, Buffalo, New York
- Berkeley Art Museum, Berkeley, California
- The Martin Z. Margulies Collection, Miami, Florida
- Kunstmuseum, Basel, Switzerland
- Fonds régional d'art contemporain de Bretagne, Rennes, France
