= Zarouhie Abdalian =

American artist of Armenian descent

- Born: 1982 (age 43–44); New Orleans, Louisiana, U.S.
- Education: Tulane University (BA); California College of the Arts (MFA)
- Known for: Site-specific art
- Awards: SECA Art Award; 2012; Pollock-Krasner Foundation grant 2017–2018; Joan Mitchell Foundation grant 2020
- Website: zarouhie.com

Zarouhie Abdalian (born 1982) is an American artist of Armenian descent, known for site-specific sculptures and installations.

== Early life and education ==
Zarouhie Abdalian was born and raised in New Orleans, Louisiana; and is of Armenian descent. Abdalian obtained a Bachelor of Arts from Tulane University in 2003, and graduated with a Master of Fine Arts from the California College of the Arts in 2010.

== Career ==
Abdalian is particularly attentive to the ways in which historical processes are embedded in physical transformations of spaces. She is a 2012 recipient of the SECA Art Award. She was also a 2017–2018 Pollock-Krasner Foundation grantee. In 2020, she was awarded a Joan Mitchell Foundation grant.

== Work ==
Abdalian's first solo exhibition in New York, at Clifton Benevento, presented a constellation of subtly altered found objects that echo the features of the gallery and of each other.

Abdalian produces site-specific sculptural works and interventions. Prior to focusing on her site-specific work, Abdalian worked in printmaking and painting. She became more interested in working directly with the elements of space after a 2004 exhibition in a non-traditional venue. Her works respond directly to architectural and outdoor spaces, using sound, light, and other natural forces to create subtle experiences that are open to multiple interpretations.

She had a 2013 show called "Zarouhie Abdalian / MATRIX 249" at the Berkeley Art Museum, with sculptures that are sensitive to the exhibition space. The sculptures were set up to use the out-of-the-way location of the gallery and aspects of the walls and space as part of the effect of the art. In 2013 she also installed a sound sculpture, "Occasional Music", in Frank H. Ogawa Plaza in Oakland, with brass bells that occasionally ring together out of sight.

== Exhibitions ==
Her work has been included in the following group exhibitions:

- "Put It This Way: (Re)Visions of the Hirshhorn Collection", Hirshhorn Museum and Sculpture Garden, 2023
- Whitney Biennial, New York, 2017
- Prospect.3, New Orleans, 2014–15
- "Audible Spaces," David Winton Bell Gallery, Providence, RI, 2014
- Eighth Berlin Biennale, Berlin, Germany, 2014
- "Nothing Beside Remains," Gertrude Contemporary, Melbourne, Australia, 2014
- CAFAM Biennale, Beijing, China, 2014
- "Shanghai Bienniale: Reactivation," Shanghai, China, 2012
- "When Attitudes Became Form Become Attitudes," CCA's Wattis Institute for Contemporary Art, San Francisco; and the Museum of Contemporary Art Detroit, 2012–2013
- Moscow International Biennale for Young Art, Moscow, Russia, 2012
- "Rendez-vous 12," South African National Gallery, Cape Town, South Africa, 2012
- The Istanbul Biennial, Istanbul, Turkey, 2011

She has had solo exhibitions of her work at the following venues:

- "Bells for Baku, London, Louisiana", Pippy Houldsworth Gallery, 2023
- "Chanson du ricochet", MASS MoCA, 2016–2021
- "Zarouhie Abdalian: A History," Altman Siegel, San Francisco, 2017
- "Work," LAXART, Los Angeles, 2017
- "A Betrayal," Clifton Benevento, New York, 2016
- "An Overture," Altman Siegel, San Francisco, 2014
- "Zarouhie Abdalian / MATRIX 249," Berkeley Art Museum and Pacific Film Archive, 2013
