= Lindsey White =

American visual artist (born 1980)

- Born: August 11, 1980 (age 46); Tulsa, Oklahoma, U.S.
- Education: California College of the Arts
- Known for: Photography, video, sculpture, and book making
- Website: www.lindseywhiteprojects.net

Lindsey Danelle White (1980) is a visual artist working across many disciplines including photography, video, sculpture, and book making. Her work has been described as "reveling in lighthearted gags and simple gestures to create an experience that is all the more satisfying for the puzzles it contains." White is a contemporary American photographer and visual artist whose work explores the aesthetics of stand-up comedy and magic. She is known for photographic and sculptural works that examine performance, illusion, and gender dynamics within these fields.

== Early life and education ==
White was born in 1980 in Tulsa, Oklahoma. She received her Bachelor of Fine Arts from Pacific Northwest College of Art in Portland, Oregon and her Master of Fine Arts from the California College of Art in San Francisco, California.

== Work ==
Her solo exhibitions include 2017 SFMOMA SECA Award Exhibition at the San Francisco Museum of Modern Art, In That Case: Havruta in Contemporary Art at the Contemporary Jewish Museum, San Francisco, CA. "Through video, photography, and sculpture, White models a type of site gag index, working with the language of magic and comedy to challenge ordinary perceptions by presenting the unexpected and impossible. Like a good joke, her work pits cartoonish occurrence against the mundane physicality of everyday life." White's work is fictionalizing an awkward stage moment, forming a joke in its own right. She has exhibited at places such as Museum Bärengasse, Switzerland; Bolinas Art Museum, Bolinas, California; Marylhurst Art Gym, Portland, Oregon; San Francisco International Airport Museum, San Francisco, California; diRosa, Napa Valley, California; ACME., Los Angeles, California; San Francisco Arts Commission, San Francisco, California; and Aurora Picture Show, Houston, Texas. White's work has been exhibited at institutions including the San Francisco Museum of Modern Art, and she is a recipient of the 2017 SECA Art Award.

== Collaborators ==
Additionally, she is a part of a collaborative project, Will Brown (with David Kasprzak and Jordan Stein) who reimagines the roles of artist and curator through an inventive upending of traditional exhibition formats. The collective often mines unexpected or forgotten histories that exist within artistic and cultural spheres. The practice has been described as meta-curating. "This trio of artist-curators is making exhibitions and events out of a San Francisco storefront that are smart, weird and historical, with a great sense of humor. Their latest installation — inspired by a true story involving the fate of painter Kazimir Malevich's burial site in Moscow — transformed the space into a luxury Russian condominium." Will Brown has realized projects with Wattis Institute, Kadist Foundation, Ulrich Museum of Art, di Rosa, Headlands Center of the Arts, and in 2015 had a solo MATRIX exhibition at the Berkeley Museum of Art/Pacific Film Archive. Will Brown was awarded a Creative Fund Grant in collaboration with the San Francisco Art Institute in 2015.

== Publications ==
- Cotton, Charlotte (2015). Photography is Magic. Aperture. ISBN 978-1-59711-331-1
- White, Lindsey. "The American Road Trip." The Photographer's Playbook, Ed. Jason Fulford and Gregory Halpern, Aperture, 2014 ISBN 978-1-59711-247-5

== Teaching ==
White is currently an Assistant Professor of Photography at the San Francisco Art Institute.
