= Liam Everett =

American painter (born 1973)

- Born: October 4, 1974 (age 51); Rochester, New York, U.S.
- Education: Empire State College; California College of the Arts
- Known for: Painting; Sculptor

Liam Everett (born 4 October 1973) is an American contemporary artist. Everett lives and works in Sebastopol, California.

== Early life and education ==
Liam Everett was born in Rochester, New York, in 1973. His father was a theater producer, and his interest in the arts began as a child when he was cast in a production of Samuel Beckett's play Waiting for Godot. He began painting a few years later, and has said that many aspects of his current practice are rooted in the methods he learned from working in the theater. He studied cultural anthropology and philosophy as an undergraduate student at S.U.N.Y. Empire State College in New York before earning a Master's of Fine Arts in painting from the California College of the Arts in 2012.

== Work ==
Everett creates paintings and sculptures in an abstract style. His first solo exhibition at Altman Siegel Gallery in 2012 featured small oil paintings on masonite board and free-standing and leaning wooden and steel frames draped with painted silk.

Beginning in 2013, Everett began creating paintings on linen. The process for these works involves working on the un-stretched fabric, building up many layers of oil paint and ink, and then eroding those layers through a variety of materials and methods including alcohol, salt, steel wool, and a power sander.

Everett's style has been described as theatrical and performative, and involves placing objects from the studio, which the artist has called "obstructions" and "props," onto the surface of the canvas before making a mark. These objects serve as obstacles that force the artist to work around and through them, dictating his movements and marks.

=== Teaching ===
In 2013, Everett was awarded the Richard Diebenkorn Teaching Fellowship from the San Francisco Art Institute, and subsequently taught two courses and gave several lectures at the college.

== Exhibitions ==
Everett has exhibited internationally in group shows including A Slow Succession with Many Interruptions at the San Francisco Museum of Modern Art (2016), the Biennale of Painting at the Museum Dhondt-Dhaenens, Deurle, Belgium (2016) and Color Shift at the Berkeley Art Museum and Pacific Film Archive (2014). He has had solo exhibitions at venues including the San Francisco Museum of Modern Art (2017); Altman Siegel Gallery, San Francisco (2012, 2016, 2018); galerie kamel mennour, Paris and London (2017, 2018, 2019); Eleni Koroneou Gallery, Athens (2015, 2017); Office Baroque, Brussels (2015); and White Columns, New York (2009); among others. In 2017, he was awarded the SECA Art Award from the San Francisco Museum of Modern Art, and featured in a related exhibition at the museum.

== Collections ==
- The Metropolitan Museum of Art, New York
- San Francisco Museum of Modern Art, San Francisco
- Berkeley Art Museum and Pacific Film Archive, Berkeley
- Fondation Carmignac, Paris, France
