= Mitzi Pederson =

American sculptor (born 1976)

- Born: 1976 (age 49–50); Stuart, Florida
- Education: California College of the Arts
- Occupations: Artist, sculptor

Mitzi Pederson (born 1976) is an American artist specializing in abstract sculptural work. Pederson is known for her use of ordinary household, construction, and building materials to explore sculptural concepts of weight, tension, balance, and permanence. She is the recipient of a 2006 SECA Art Award. Pederson splits her time between San Francisco and Berlin.

== Early life and education ==
Pederson was born in 1976 in Stuart, Florida. She has an M.F.A. in painting and drawing from the California College of the Arts, a B.F.A. in printing, painting, and drawing, along with a minor in architecture, from Carnegie Mellon University, and studied at L'École nationale supérieure des Beaux-Arts in Paris, France.

== Work ==
Pederson uses everyday materials as the basis of her work, with an emphasis on the material of construction. She sources these materials from remnants of destruction, such as scrap heaps, as well as hardware stores and other retailers. Her sculptures have included cinderblocks, plywood, cellophane, fabric, tulle, wire, sand, glitter, and paint. The materials are often presented in a nearly-raw state, with light embellishment using ephemera such as gilding, tulle, and glitter.

== Critical reception ==
Pederson began showing during her time at the California College of the Arts, appearing with regularity in gallery exhibitions at the institution and in galleries around the San Francisco Bay Area. In 2006, two years after completing her M.F.A. program, Pederson was announced as one of four recipients of the SECA Art Award from the San Francisco Museum of Modern Art.

In 2008, Pederson's work was included in the Whitney Biennial, at the Whitney Museum of American Art in New York City. Both the SECA Award and the Whitney Biennial focus on emerging, lesser known contemporary artists; the Biennial has been described as "one of the most important surveys of the state of contemporary art in the United States." In 2008, art critic Glen Helfand included Pederson's exhibition "Unlet Me Go" as a selection in his top ten "exhibitions, events, and films" from 2007 based on "joy, originality, and serious subtext."

Her work has been described by curators as possessing a graceful use of balance, deliberation, and incongruity, while marrying elements in unexpected or impracticable ways. She is noted for "restrained gestures," "contemplative" investigations of energy and time. Critics have described her work as "sparse [and] smart," having a "savvy humbleness," and "slight in a cerebral way," while citing her "aesthetic sensibility and formal courage" and ability to produce a "radical evolution of simple things."

Critics have suggested Pederson's work has antecedents in and influences from sculptors such Richard Serra, Richard Tuttle, and Anselm Reyle. Her work has been compared favorably with work by Joëlle Tuerlinckx and James Turrell.

== Awards and honors ==
- SECA Art Award 2006, San Francisco Museum of Modern Art
- Whitney Biennial 2008, Whitney Museum of American Art

== See also ==
- San Francisco Museum of Modern Art (SFMoMA) 2006 SECA Award announcement
- Whitney Museum of American Art: Whitney Biennial 2008 Exhibition Catalogue
