= Desiree Holman =

- Born: 1974 (age 50–51); Montgomery, Alabama, United States
- Education: California College of the Arts, University of California, Berkeley
- Known for: Interdisciplinary Artist
- Awards: SECA Art Award; 2008

Desirée Holman (born 1974) is an American artist who is based in the Bay Area, California.

== Education and career ==
Desiree Holman received her master's degree from the University of California, Berkeley and her Bachelor of Fine Arts from California College of the Arts. She was among the 2008 SECA Art Award winners from the San Francisco Museum of Modern Art as well as 2007 winner of the Artadia: Fund for Art and Dialogue award.

Holman is an interdisciplinary artist that pulls from pop culture among other things to explore personal and visual histories. Some of her solo exhibitions include the Hammer Museum in Los Angeles, and the Berkeley Art Museum’s MATRIX program. Holman’s work has been internationally recognised at the Sao Paulo Museum of Modern Art, Hessel Museum, Yerba Buena Center for the Arts, di Rosa, Milan’s BnD, and Toronto’s YYZ. Her work is represented by Aspect/Ratio in Chicago, IL.

== Themes ==
Holman artwork explores a variety of mediums such as drawings, sculpture, photography and video. Her work often combines all of these in low-fi video productions that involve masks, costumes, and the choreography of multiple participants. Holman’s work is concerned with the performance of identity, alternative realities, and the relationship between self and other.

== Exhibitions ==
In 2002, Holmans work was involved in a group exhibition entitled "Seamless: A New Breed of Fashion Show," hosted by the Yerba Buena Center for the Arts and co-produced by ADHOC. The exhibition included six multidisciplinary artists/designers who all showed new work.

In 2009, her work was shown in Los Angeles in the exhibition ‘Hammer Projects: Desirée Holman.’ Holman's project,‘Reborn,’ featured drawings, three-channel video installation and sculpture. The work was inspired by a subculture of women (primarily in the U.S. and Great Britain) called ‘reborners’ who care for incredibly lifelike baby dolls, bathing and feeding them as they would a real infant. Holman created her own realistic dolls and drew Mary Cassatt inspired images of mothers and their babies. The exhibition was organized by Hammer Curator Ali Subotnick.

In 2011, Holman's exhibition ‘Heterotopias’ was shown as part of the MATRIX 238 program at the Berkeley Art Museum and Pacific Film Archive. The exhibition included drawings and video. Holman had nine performers imagine alternate identities to create an avatar, or surrogate self, for which she then created props and costumes. Performers used the props and costumes to act out their character in a choreographed music video. She then had each performer fully rendered as a 3-D model in a virtual gamescape. The exhibition was curated by Phyllis Wattis MATRIX Curator Elizabeth Thomas with Dena Beard, Assistant Curator.
