= Marcel Dadi =

French guitarist

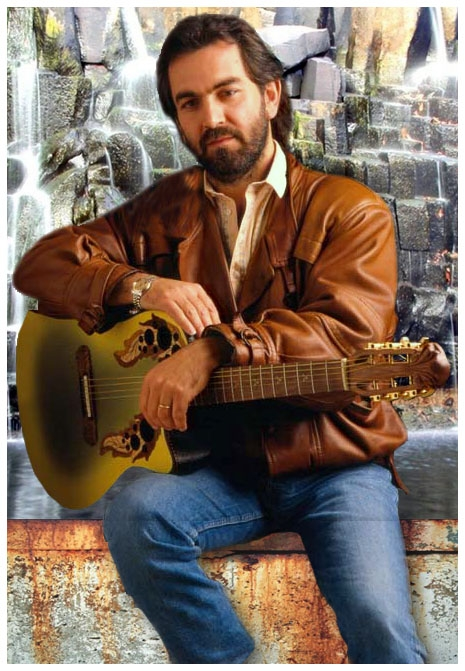
- Born: 20 August 1951; Sousse, French Tunisia
- Died: 17 July 1996 (aged 44); Long Island, New York, U.S.
- Known for: Guitarist

Marcel Dadi (French: [maʁsɛl dadi]; 20 August 1951 – 17 July 1996) was a Tunisian-born French virtuoso guitarist known for his finger-picking style which faithfully recreated the instrumental styles of American guitarists such as Chet Atkins, Merle Travis and Jerry Reed. He became a friend of country star Chet Atkins.

== Biography ==
=== Early life ===
Marcel Dadi was born in Sousse, Tunisia on 20 August 1951. Dadi, along with his immediate family, moved to Paris, France in 1954. In 1961, he started playing guitar at age 10. He had joined Andre Assouline, Joseph Illouz, and Maurice Levy to form a rock instrumental band by 1964. He was inspired by the music of The Beatles, The Rolling Stones and Bob Dylan, He continued to expand his musical horizons with the influence of a guitarist, Bernard Photzer, who introduced him to the music of Elvis Presley and other 1950's rockers. Photzer also taught him the rudiments of flatpicking. As a soloist with French singer-songwriter and guitarist, Hugues Aufray, Dadi began to develop his own approach to flatpicking. From 1972, he wrote instructional articles for Folk Music Review, wherein he introduced his rigorous training method, which utilizes a fingering chart, in the March 1972 issue.

=== Career ===
Dadi released several LPs and some instructional videos before his early death. His recordings featured a mix of compositions by his American heroes and original compositions of his own in a similar style. A feature of his early LPs was that they included a tablature booklet, allowing guitarists to learn the tunes for themselves. Dadi often recorded tunes dedicated to his friends, such as "Roger Chesterfield," dedicated to Roger C. Field with whom he first went to Nashville in 1975 to visit Chet Atkins.

Marcel Dadi immigrated to Eilat (Israel) on the Red Sea, in 1983, and lived there with his wife and young son for several years before moving back to France. In 1988, Eric Clapton, his longtime family friend, came to Eilat to visit Marcel Dadi.

== Death ==
On 17 July 1996, en route from New York City to Paris with his band and his long time friend Serge Sloimovits, Marcel Dadi died when the Boeing 747-131 operating TWA Flight 800 exploded off the coast of Long Island. He was returning from the United States to France after being honored at Nashville's Country Music Hall of Fame.

Marcel Dadi's body was recovered, as were those of all of the other victims. He is buried on the Mount of Olives in Jerusalem, Israel.

== Certified Guitar Player ==
Marcel Dadi was honoured as one of the five "Certified Guitar Players" by Chet Atkins.
