= Kota Ezawa =

Japanese-German-American artist and arts educator

- Born: 1969 (age 56–57); Cologne, West Germany
- Education: Kunstakademie Düsseldorf; San Francisco Art Institute; Stanford University
- Awards: Guggenheim Fellowship 2026 Louis Comfort Tiffany Foundation Award 2003

Kota Ezawa (born 1969, Cologne, Germany) is a Japanese-German American visual artist widely recognized for his artworks in which the subject is a source image, film, or news footage that Ezawa has redrawn in his distinctive visual style and remade as a video, mural, light box, sculpture, or in another medium.

Ezawa’s artworks have been exhibited in museums and galleries worldwide. He participated in the Whitney Biennial in 2019, and the Shanghai Biennale in 2004. His work is in the collections of institutions including the Art Institute of Chicago, IL; Baltimore Museum of Art, Baltimore, MD; Hirshhorn Museum and Sculpture Garden, Washington, DC; Metropolitan Museum of Art, New York, NY; The Museum of Modern Art, New York, NY; San Francisco Museum of Modern Art, San Francisco, CA; Smithsonian American Art Museum, Washington, DC; and the Whitney Museum of American Art, New York, NY, and elsewhere.

Ezawa is a recipient of a Louis Comfort Tiffany Foundation Award, the Artadia Award and an SECA Art Award. The artist received a Guggenheim Fellowship in 2026.

== Education ==
Ezawa attended Kunstakademie Düsseldorf from 1990 until 1994 and studied with Nan Hoover and Nam June Paik. He moved in 1994 to San Francisco, California and graduated with a Bachelor of Fine Arts in 1995 from San Francisco Art Institute where his was influenced by the work of Nayland Blake and film and video artist George Kuchar. In 2003 he received his Master of Fine Arts degree from Stanford University.

== Notable artworks and exhibitions ==
=== Early Work ===
In 2001, having taught himself how to computer animate, Ezawa made his first digitally drawn and animated video, Home Video, which features a fixed exterior view of a suburban house -- based on an image the artist found in a Bay Area real estate brochure -- above which, the clouds pass, the sky changes from day to night, and interior lights are switched on and off by unseen occupants. Attracted to animation for its “constructed” nature, the artist has stated, “In art history, I always gravitated towards Constructivism and early 20th-century forms, and I thought animation was kind of a contemporary form of Suprematism.” Home Video is an early instance of Ezawa translating a source image into a constructed, “fictionalized reality” presented in a new visual form.

Simpson Verdict (2002)

Ezawa created his widely exhibited video, Simpson Verdict, by using Vector graphic drawing software to manually redraw video footage of the moment the verdict was announced in the court proceedings of the O.J. Simpson trial. “I drew all the hands, eyes and figures” and “re-created all the motions, trying to simulate the motions of the people in the video,” Ezawa told Kenneth Baker in an interview with the San Francisco Chronicle. “What results is very stylized, but it’s an honest effort at translation.” Ezawa notes in an interview with Donato Loia for the Blanton Museum of Art that Simpson Verdict uses the original audio, and “has the same duration of the original footage, and shows the same event, yet the emotional response to it will be different because of the stylization. This drawing style might also give the impression that the events are presented as fictional. But for me stylization is mostly a way to engage the viewer emotionally.” Simpson Verdict demonstrates Ezawa’s process of abstracting a representational source image by rendering it in his distinctive style of drawing in which he flattens compositions and uses unmodulated colors that are reminiscent of color field painting, as well as the Superflat aesthetic in Japanese art and animation which tends towards “two-dimensionality” – an influence cited by the artist. Shown at San Francisco's Yerba Buena Center for the Arts in 2002, the video was included in the group exhibition, Out of Time: A Contemporary View at the Museum of Modern Art, New York in 2006. Simpson Verdict first revealed Ezawa’s interest in “translating” culturally charged depictions by manually recreating them and presenting them in forms different from the format of the original source. Ezawa states in an interview with the Brooklyn Rail, “The Simpson Verdict was the piece where I developed this entire process.”

Lennon Sontag Beuys (2004)

For the work, Lennon Sontag Beuys (2004), Ezawa redrew footage of three well-known events: John Lennon and Yoko Ono’s ‘bed in’ for peace in 1969, a lecture by media theorist Susan Sontag at Columbia University in 2001, and Joseph Beuys’ Public Dialogue from 1974 at the New School for Philosophical Research, and presented his reconstructed iterations in a three-channel video installation with the three original soundtracks. Exhibited in New York at Murray Guy Gallery in 2005, art critic Martha Schwendener writes of Ezawa’s visual style and this installation, “There’s something comical about all this: the flat colors; the moving, animated eyes and mouths; the range of accents; the overlapping of voices which suggests the chatter at an extra discourse-y cocktail party.…With Ezawa, however, the voices and images remain the same as in the originals; only the format has been altered, reminding us that culture is just as reliant on proper packaging as any other arena in life…”

The History of Photography Remix (2004–2006)

Presented in an exhibition at the Wadsworth Atheneum was Ezawa’s artwork, The History of Photography Remix (2004–2006) the artist’s version of the history of photography in the form of a slide show comprising redrawn iconic photographs from a vast array of sources. In a 2013 iteration of The History of Photography Remix, presented in a solo exhibition of Ezawa’s work at the Buffalo AKG Art Museum, Ezawa incorporated other art-historical photographs which he had remade as paper cutouts.

Barbershop, 1936 (2004) is Ezawa’s recreation of a Walker Evans photograph which Ezawa redrew and presented as a photographic transparency in a light box which was exhibited in the Metropolitan Museum’s exhibition, ‘After Photoshop’.

LYAM (2008)

To create his video, LYAM (2008), Ezawa applied his process of visual translation to Alain Resnais’s influential 1961 film, Last Year in Marienbad. Ezawa’s work was shown in the group exhibition, Last Year in Marienbad: A Film as Art at Kunsthalle Bremen in 2015.

The Crime of Art (2017-18)

For The Crime of Art (2017-18) Ezawa made a series of videos as well as transparencies presented in light boxes that “chronicle high-profile museum heists and acts of art vandalism in real life and in Hollywood films.” At the center of the installation is a series of light boxes that feature Ezawa’s recreations of the 13 artworks–including those by Degas, Manet, Rembrandt, and Vermeer–stolen from the Isabella Stewart Gardner Museum in 1990. The series was featured in a solo exhibition organized by SITE Santa Fe with the Mead Art Museum, which traveled to museums around the U.S. including the Museum of Contemporary Art Santa Barbara.

National Anthem (2018)

Ezawa’s video, National Anthem (2018) was included in the 2019 Whitney Biennial. The artist’s two-minute video depicts “NFL football players taking a knee during ‘The Star-Spangled Banner.’ Protesting police violence against unarmed Black men, the practice was started in 2016 by San Francisco 49ers quarterback Colin Kaepernick.” To make National Anthem, Ezawa repurposed footage of multiple teams with some close-up shots of players kneeling, “using it as the basis for meticulous, small-scale watercolor paintings.” These watercolors, totaling over 200 images, some rendered more than once, became the frames of the animation. Ezawa’s process “reduces complex imagery to its essence; by removing extraneous elements from the image…” Resultantly, the artist’s work encourages a further, “neutral” reexamination of culturally charged depictions removed from their original context. As Melissa Smith notes in a New York Times review, similar to the way Ezawa’s Simpson Verdict “recontextualizes that history”, National Anthem distills the images of the players’ gestures, “leaving us free to examine them anew.”

Speaking about his choice of subject matter in general, Ezawa has noted that he does not see his work as “a commentary on American culture.” He has stated, “As an immigrant who has lived in the United States for a long time, I view my surroundings as an observer with the perspective and distance that immigrants bring to the experience. Yet I am not attempting to dictate how others should view life in the United States. Rather, I simply record and convey my own impressions.”

== Public artworks ==
Ezawa extends his concepts and process to public artworks. The Vancouver Art Gallery Offsite presented Ezawa’s large-scale sculpture Hand Vote (2008) in downtown Vancouver in 2012. Ezawa based the painted wood sculpture on an image of a group of individuals holding up their hands to vote; it stood at street level over 20 feet tall and thirty feet long.

Originally shown in a public art installation in New York’s Madison Square park, Ezawa made his video, City of Nature (2011) by weaving together seventy recreated clips “from popular feature-length films in which nature plays a significant role in the overarching narrative.” The six-minute video work samples nature scenes, which the artist manually redrew is his own style, from more than 20 popular films including, ‘Brokeback Mountain’, ‘Days of Heaven’, ‘Deliverance’, ‘Der Berg Ruft’, ‘Fitzcarraldo’, ‘Late Spring’, ‘Lord of the Flies’, ‘Moby Dick’, ‘Swept Away’, and ‘Twin Peaks’.

Ezawa’s “three-dimensional wood cutout” Mondrian Meets The Beatles (2017) is installed at the San Francisco International Airport, and Peace Piece (2022), a 20 foot wide, 80 foot tall mural is installed on the facade of a building on University of California San Francisco’s Mission Bay campus.
