= Josephine Taylor =

American artist

Josephine Taylor is an American artist known for large narrative drawings.

== Biography ==
Taylor was born in 1977 in Phoenix, Arizona, and grew up in Denver, Colorado. She attended Brown University and The University of Colorado at Boulder, where she received a BA in Religion and East Indian Languages (Hindi/Sanskrit). She completed a Masters in Fine Arts from the San Francisco Art Institute. Taylor was awarded the San Francisco Museum of Modern Art SECA Award in 2004, was included in Bay Area Now IV at Yerba Buena Center for the Arts in San Francisco, and was included in the California Biennial at the Orange County Museum of Art in 2004. Taylor's work has exhibited extensively nationally and internationally. Her work is in the permanent collections of San Francisco Museum of Modern Art, the Museum of Modern Art, New York, Fine Arts Museums of San Francisco, and 21C Museum. She lives and works in San Francisco and has shown with Catharine Clark Gallery since 2003. Taylor has taught Drawing/Painting at the Undergraduate and Graduate levels at Stanford University, UC Berkeley, The San Francisco Art Institute, and California College of the Arts.

== Works ==
Josephine Taylor, Skinned and Flayed (2010), colored ink on paper

Taylor uses diluted ink washes to create narrative drawings on very large, unframed pieces of paper. The subject matter of her work deals with psychological traces of childhood and adolescent memories. The 2004 SECA Art Award exhibition catalogue describes her work thus:

The works function slowly, luring us up close, where we need to be in order to really see. And once there, existing in a bodily relationship with her figures, we cannot believe what we are seeing: Children taunt and torment one another; tenderness and abuse intertwine among family; loved ones meet sudden deaths. The works collapse past and present, showing how the artist's memories of fraught personal experiences linger as residue in her current psychological landscape.
