= Ciel Bergman =

American painter (1938–2017)

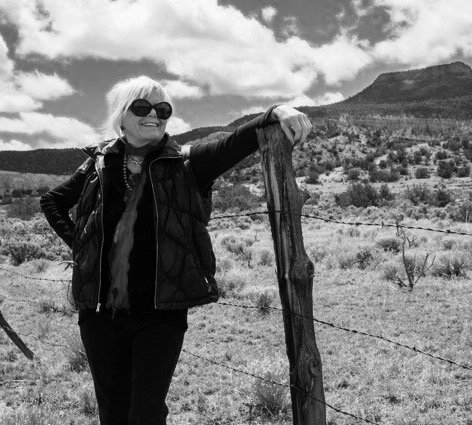
- Born: Cheryl Marie Bergman; September 11, 1938; Berkeley, California
- Died: January 15, 2017 (aged 78)
- Education: San Francisco Art Institute California State University
- Known for: Painting
- Awards: SECA Art Award, 1975; Louis Comfort Tiffany Award, 1980
- Website: cielbergman.com

Cheryl Marie Bowers (née Olsen, September 11, 1938 – January 15, 2017), known as Ciel Bergman, was an American painter of Swedish origin. Her work, considered post-modern, has a focus on the environment as well as feminine consciousness.

== Early career ==
Bergman, who was known Cheryl Bowers at the time, had originally trained to be a psychiatric nurse. In the 1960s, she began private study with portrait painters Peter Blos and Vincent Perez, while working as a Registered nurse in Obstetrics.

She was awarded first place in painting at The Jack London Invitational, Oakland and then returned to school. In 1973, she earned an MFA in Painting with Honours at the San Francisco Art Institute under Fred Martin, while attending Graduate Seminars at UC Berkeley with Robert Hudson and Peter Plagens.

== Work ==
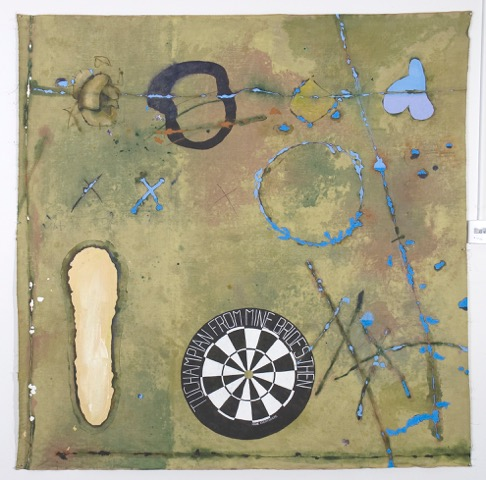
Ciel Bergman, Spiritual Guide Map for Modern Western Man

Bergman's work consists primarily of paintings, drawings, prints, photography, constructions and prose using the metaphors of the water, the rose and rose petals. Her paintings in the mid-1980s depicted aspects of goddess using symbols from the collective unconscious.

In 1987, Bergman addressed the growing urgency of plastic recycling in the Sea of Clouds What Can I Do, presented at Santa Barbara Contemporary Art Forum. An immersive installation filled the entire gallery space with seven dumpsters full of non-biodegradable waste plastic garbage gathered from four miles of Santa Barbara's Pacific Ocean coastline over the course of three or four months. The installation included painted wall murals, sound, a video written and shot by the artist, photography, a meditation circle, writing, and a prayer sticks altar with interactive participation of visitors to the exhibition. The installation resembled a post-nuclear ash site: floors were littered with sprawling piles of plastic which hung from the ceiling, sprinkled with flour. After the exhibition closed, six dumpsters were needed to haul away the refuse.

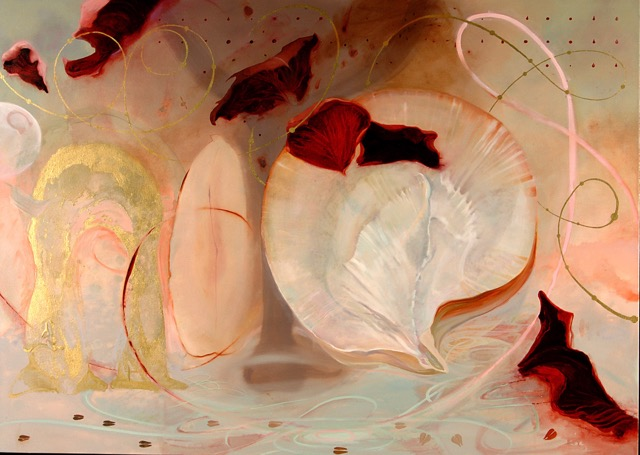
Ciel Bergman, Her compassion

== Plasphalt ==
Realizing that plastic, like asphalt, is a petroleum product, Bergman theorized that plastic could be recycled and used to build highways. She brought the idea to her former partner Gary Fishback, who patented it under the Plasphalt™. Plasphalt consists of recycled plastic that is made into a heat absorbing material and is added to asphalt to displace petroleum and hydrocarbon pollutants. While at the time 10% more expensive to use than traditional asphalt, Plasphalt lasts 25% longer. In 2002, Plasphalt was used to reinforce a 2-mile stretch of New Mexico's I-25. Fishback and Erik Bowers (Bergman's son) of TEWA Technology developed the project and materials, diverting 27% of all waste from landfill to the highway. At the time TEWA's best local suppliers were Philips Semiconductors, Intel, Coca-Cola, and Sandia National Laboratories. Unfortunately, because of lack of support from local government, the company went bankrupt. However, Plasphalt is now used to build roads in China and India. The benefits of using plastic in asphalt according to Michael Valenti, author of Plastic Plus Asphalt equals "Plasphalt", is that the impermeability of the plastic improved the water proofing of the Plasphalt, making it more resistant to rain, snow, or ice. A benefit of the Plasphalt process is that it works well with mixed plastics, such as high density polyethylene and polytetrafluorethylene. It also does not require the laborious sorting of different types of plastics, as do other recycling techniques. Laying a single mile of road would require 100 to 200 tons of Plasphalt according to Dennis Egan, a mechanical engineer with Plasphalt Project Ltd.

== Academic appointments ==
After lecturing at the University of California, Berkeley from 1973 to 1975, and teaching at the University of Oregon from 1975 to 1976, Bergman became a full professor at the University of California, Santa Barbara, teaching there from 1976 to 1994. While at UCSB, she sat on the Academic Senate's affirmative action committee, teaching and hiring women.

== Personal life ==
Bergman had two children from her marriage to Lynn Franklyn Bowers. In 1988, the artist made what she felt was a necessary spiritual decision to legally change her name on her 50th birthday, from Cheryl Marie Bowers to Ciel Bergman, to honor her Swedish maternal grandmother, Emma Josephine Bergman. In Blood, Milk, Water, scholar Wendy Steiner said, "Her name itself represents that sort of shift - from Cheryl Bowers to Ciel Bergman - becoming a landscape of 'sky' and' mountain' that is a typical background in her paintings."

== Awards ==
As Cheryl Bowers, Bergman was the recipient of a Society for the Encouragement of the Creative Arts SECA Art Award in painting, from the San Francisco Museum of Modern Art and was included in the Whitney Biennial of American Art in 1975 as Cheryl Bowers. In 1980, as Cheryl Bowers, she was honored with the Louis Comfort Tiffany Award. Under her name of Ciel Bergman, she was awarded a residency at The Djerassi Foundation in 2009 and the Ucross Art Foundation in 2014.

== Collections ==
Bergman's work is included in numerous museum and corporate collections, including the Metropolitan Museum of Art, New York City; Oakland Museum of California, Oakland, CA; the National Gallery, Washington, DC; Atlantic Richfield; Saks Fifth Avenue; The Capitol Group; Banco di Roma; and Bank of America, as well private collection in the United States, Europe and Asia.

- Achenbach Foundation, Palace Legion of Honor, San Francisco, CA
- Charles A. Wustum Museum of Fine Art, Racine, Wisconsin
- Contemporary Arts Society (Great Britain), London, UK
- Metropolitan Museum of Art, New York City, NY
- Museum of Modern Art (Eye Magazine), New York City, NY
- National Gallery, Washington, DC (prints)
- Nevada Museum of Art, Archives, ART+ECO, Reno, NV (Plasphalt)
- New Mexico Museum of Art, Santa Fe, NM
- Oakland Museum of California Art, Oakland, CA
- Orange County Museum of Art, Anaheim, CA
- Richard L. Nelson Fine Art Collection, University of California, Davis, CA
- Ruth Chandler Williamson Gallery, Scripps College, Pomona, California
- Sackner Archive of Concrete and Visual Poetry, Miami, FL
- San Diego Museum of Contemporary Art, San Diego, CA
- San Francisco Museum of Modern Art, CA
- Santa Barbara Museum of Art, Santa Barbara, CA
- University Art Museum, University of California, Berkeley, CA
- University Art Museum, University of California, Santa Barbara, CA
- University of Washington, Bellingham, WA
- Whitney Museum of American Art (Eye Magazine), New York City, NY
