= Laurie Reid =

American artist (born 1964)

- Born: 1964 (age 61–62); Minneapolis, Minnesota, U.S.
- Occupation: Painter

Academic background
- Education: California College of the Arts; Reed College

Academic work
- Discipline: Art
- Institutions: San Francisco Art Institute

Laurie Reid (born 1964) is an American artist living in Berkeley, California.

== Early life and education ==
She was born in Minneapolis, Minnesota and grew up in Eugene, Oregon. She attended Reed College in Portland, Oregon where she studied French Literature. She later moved to the Bay Area and earned an MFA at the California College of Arts and Crafts.

== Work ==
In 1998 Reid won the SECA Award, which included an exhibition of her work at the San Francisco Museum of Modern Art in 1999. Reid's work was included in the Whitney Biennial in 2000. Reid works in both expansive and more limited canvases: In the above exhibitions she displayed large works (5 to 16-foot long watercolors) with very little color on them. In 2001, she collaborated with Crown Point Press on a series of etchings measured in inches rather than feet. Many of the etchings comprise simple drops of color arranged in space.

Reid was a close friend and collaborator of poet and writer Barbara Guest. Together they created and published the book Symbiosis in 2000.

Reid's work makes use of gravity (what she refers to as "chance") upon the physical materials, sometimes like sculpture. An art writer described this as "She lets the paint affect the paper in whatever way it will, and the result is a billowing, textured surface." Reid has said: "I do sometimes use a grid, and other formal constructs, but there’s always the human hand involved. Psyche, material, form—it is a concoction that has to be brewed just right."

As of 2017, she teaches at the San Francisco Art Institute.

Reid's work is included in the collections of The Museum of Modern Art, New York; The Whitney Museum of American Art, New York; The National Gallery of Art, Washington DC; The Hammer Museum of Art, Los Angeles; The San Francisco Museum of Art, The Philadelphia Museum of Art, and Berkeley Art Museum and Pacific Film Archive (BAMPFA) among others.
