= Bella Feldman =

American sculptor

Bella Tabak Feldman
- Born: Bella R. Tabak; 1930; New York City, New York, U.S.
- Died: May 6, 2024 (aged 94); Berkeley, California, U.S.
- Education: Queens College (BA); San Jose State University (MA)
- Employer: California College of the Arts
- Known for: sculpture
- Website: Official website

Bella Tabak Feldman (née Bella R. Tabak; 1930 – May 6, 2024) was an American sculptor. Her work addressed the themes of sexuality, war, and the persistent anxiety of the industrial age. Feldman was known for pioneering the use of glass with steel. Her work has affinities with Surrealism, Post-Minimalism, and the Feminist art movement, although she has no formal affiliation with these. She was a Professor Emeritus at the California College of the Arts. Feldman lived and worked in Oakland, California and in London, England.

== Early life and career ==
Bella R. Tabak was born in 1930 in New York City, to a family of working-class Jewish immigrants from Poland. She grew up in the Bronx tenements. She attended The High School of Music & Art in Manhattan during World War II.

Students were required to visit museums and galleries as part of the curriculum. When Feldman was thirteen, she visited her first art museum, the Museum of Modern Art. There, she saw Meret Oppenheim's Object (1936), the fur-lined cup and saucer, and was struck by her strong psychological response to this work. Other early influences included Alberto Giacometti's The Palace at 4 am (1932) and the sculpture of David Smith. One of Feldman's earliest sculptures Warrior (1952) pays tribute to Giacometti. During the Holocaust, Feldman lost numerous family members who remained in Poland, an experience that helped shape her worldview. This includes her lifelong preoccupation with war, and the overwhelming effects of the military–industrial complex.

Feldman received a BA degree from Queens College, City University of New York. She married Leonard Feldman at age 18, and moved to California with him in 1951 where they both accepted teaching positions. Feldman has two children, Nina Feldman, born 1954 and Ethan Feldman, born 1956.

== Teaching ==
In 1965, Feldman started teaching at the California College of the Arts (CCA). In 1971 she and her family moved to Uganda, East Africa on a grant from the E. L. Cabot Trust Fund at Harvard University. Feldman spent two years teaching art in Uganda prior to the genocidal war in that country. Upon her return to CCA, she faced gender discrimination and a threat to her job. Her successful fight to retain her position prompted her to later become an advocate for other women faculty, who she helped to achieve equity and job security.

Feldman was awarded an MA degree in 1973 from San Jose State University. Her teachers were Sam Richardson, John Battenberg, and Fletcher Benton.

== Work ==
=== Metamorphosis ===
In the 1970s, Feldman completed several installations portraying different stages of animal metamorphosis. These featured hybrid, mutant creatures, reminiscent of Hieronymus Bosch's triptych The Garden of Earthly Delights—rats transformed into fish, and turtles with human features. The small-scale sculptures were displayed in large clusters, their multitude invoking aggression and infestation. Birds (1970), a cast metal flock of dead birds, preceded Kiki Smith's Jersey Crows (1995) while Metamorphic Turtles (1973–75) anticipated Smith's Sirens and Harpies (2002).

=== War Toys and War Toys Redux ===
War Toys (1992) is a series created in response to the first Gulf War. Feldman was incensed by the tone of admiration she heard in President George Bush's voice when he referred to the Patriot missile. These works mocked the allure of weaponry and perceived glory in violence. The War Toys series relates to Magdalena Abakanowicz's War Games' sculptures (1989), giant monstrous weapons made of metal and wood. However, the scale and sensuality of Feldman's War Toys strip them of power. The series is in the tradition of contemporary women artists' critique of war that entwines images of male sexuality and military aggression. Examples include Nancy Spero's The War Series (1966–70), a response to the Vietnam War, and Judith Bernstein's Iraq Travel Poster (1969).

War Toys Redux (2003) evoked a different kind of mutation: the metal sculptures represented a hybrid between organic and machine forms. This adaptation continued the series with a new medium, combining blown glass with steel armatures. The sensuality of soft, bulbous glass forms reinforced the vision of earlier War Toys, effeminizing the objects of aggression and rendering them impotent.

=== Flasks of Fiction ===
Feldman pioneered the technique of blowing glass into metal forms in the late 1990s. The first series of mostly hanging sculptures Flasks of Fiction (1998–2001) were originally inspired by the lanterns in mosques Feldman visited while in Turkey. She said of these: “I combined glass and metal to suggest vulnerability and constraint as well as seduction.” Flasks of Fiction aligns Feldman with Post-Minimalist sculptors, such as Eva Hesse, who explored the inherent properties of materials and experimented with tension that results from binding bulging forms or upholding drooping forms. In Flasks of Fiction, hardened materials such as glass and steel make explicit references to bodies and sexuality, making the viewer respond viscerally to the corporeal hybrids.

=== Large Sculpture ===
Since 2003, Feldman has created a number of large-scale sculptures that embody her lifelong interest in process and materials. Combining metal and glass, organic forms and machine parts, aggression and vulnerability, such works as Dyad (2003) and Jacob's Ladder (2011) refer to Martin Puryear in scale and to Louise Bourgeois in psychic intensity.

== Exhibitions, collections, awards ==
Feldman has won numerous awards for her work, and her sculpture is featured in private and museum collections, including the Fine Arts Museums of San Francisco, the di Rosa Preserve, Napa, CA, and the Palm Springs Desert Museum.

Her work has been exhibited nationally and internationally at museums and galleries including The Oakland Museum of California; the Berkeley Art Museum; Musée des Beaux Arts, Lausanne, Switzerland; the Alternative Museum, New York; the Contemporary Jewish Museum San Francisco; Habatat Galleries, Chicago and Royal Oaks, MI; and Jan Baum Gallery, Los Angeles.

Feldman was awarded a National Endowment for the Arts' Individual Artists award in 1986 and received Distinguished Artist Awards from Kala Art Institute, Berkeley, CA (2004), and Women's Caucus for Art (2005). A fifty-year survey of her work took place at the Richmond Art Center in 2013.

== Death ==
Feldman died on May 6, 2024.
