= JoAnn Gillerman =

American new media artist

- Born: 1950 (age 75–76); St. Louis, Missouri, United States
- Education: School of the Art Institute of Chicago, Duke University
- Known for: Video, performance, installation, immersive exhibits
- Awards: National Endowment for the Arts
- Website: JoAnn Gillerman

Jo Ann Gillerman in live performance of Whispers in a Plane of Light, on a Sandin video image processor/synthesizer at Digicon '83, Vancouver, B.C., Canada, 1983.

JoAnn Gillerman (born 1950) is an American multimedia artist and educator based in the San Francisco Bay Area. She is known for interdisciplinary, often interactive and immersive, works merging art, science, culture and technology. Gillerman emerged in the 1970s as an early new media artist, creating experimental combinations of video, collaborative live performance and installation. Art historian Liz Kotz wrote, "Gillerman pioneered the use of computer graphics and synthetically-generated imagery in video art … us[ing] the technology of computer-generated and re-processed images combined with electronic and acoustic music to develop different ways of making abstract visual designs." Since the 1990s, she has employed new technologies to produce interactive and educational environments, performances and works focused on cosmic events, natural phenomena and sociopolitical issues.

Gillerman's art, videos and exhibitions have been presented at the Museum of Modern Art, Whitney Museum, San Francisco Museum of Modern Art (SFMOMA), Berkeley Art Museum and Pacific Film Archive, Saint Louis Zoo, Oakland Museum of California, and Exploratorium (San Francisco), as well as on PBS. She lives in Emeryville, California and is a professor at the California College of the Arts.

== Early life and career ==
Gillerman was born in St. Louis, Missouri in 1950. She studied art at Duke University (BA, 1972), specializing in medical and botanical illustration; at the School of the Art Institute of Chicago (SAIC) she earned an MFA in 1975 in painting, drawing and video art, a new realm at the time.

At SAIC she experimented with new media and performance while also teaching herself electronics. Before relocating to Oakland in 1976, she began building a Sandin Image Processor—loosely, a video equivalent of a Moog audio synthesizer—from scratch, completing it in 1977. She used the image processor to manipulate video signals, performing live visuals in conjunction with improvised electronic music in shows exploring sensory perception and relationships between the two art forms. This work was presented at alternative spaces such as Cat's Paw Palace and Mabuhay Gardens; in a multi-channel installation at Video Free America (1978) and solo exhibition at the Pacific Film Archive (1980); and in live performances at early computer arts and industry conferences such as Digicon 1983, CADRE (1984) and SIGGRAPH (1982–6).

During this period, Gillerman founded Viper Optics (In 1976), a video and computer graphics company, with her brother, musician James Gillerman, and artist Jim Whiteaker. The group produced multimedia shows, music and art videos, and more accessible works such as the video short Clone Baby (1982) and the feature-length horror movie, Night Feeder (1988). An interactive narrative, Night Feeder CD-ROM, was created a few years later by Gillerman and Rob Terry, under the name Viper Vertex. Gillerman has operated Viper Vertex since the 1990s with a focus on interactive multimedia works and sensor-controlled exhibits for museums and science centers.

== Work and reception ==
Gillerman's art has ranged from erotic to abstract and experimental to documentary. She has consistently employed technological, experimental, collaborative and interactive elements in conjunction with sensual and humanistic themes and imagery that soften her more hard-edged media.

JoAnn Gillerman, Orchid, video, computer graphics, image processing and frame-by-frame animation, 1985.

=== Experimental video and performance works, 1980s ===
In the 1980s, Gillerman shifted from phenomenological explorations of perception to sensual and erotic imagery in works that heralded the introduction of computer graphics into live video performance. She combined complex image processing and real-time coordination, rapid editing and dense color overlays in highly associative, playful and dramatic patterns of dissolving and reassembling forms. Whispers in a Plane of Light (1983) was a live collaboration with musician Jean Piché in which they alternately (her on image processor, him on synthesizer) controlled the imagery or sound of the other. Described as a "kaleidoscopic array of images [that] multiply and combine in a rhythmic and sensuous dance," it blended computer graphics, ambiguous forms (a Venus de Milo-like nude female torso) and tight performance footage (Gillerman overlaid in hot pink and yellow, caressing the skin of her neck, shoulders and upper chest; Piché's face in cool blues), creating a study of gender, relationships, reality and fantasy in constant flux.

Gillerman's experiments with video graphic paint systems and creative lighting led to works of visual poetry such as Orchid and Moiré (both 1985), respectively. Art historian Celeste Connor called Orchid "a highly erotic depiction of [a] flower that is composed of the body of a fully-frontal male nude in a seductive Georgia O'Keeffe like palette." VID Magazine deemed its multi-screen performance with music at SIGGRAPH 1986 "a daring and sensual montage of live nude performers and real-time computer-generated graphics." The quasi-narrative video Electric Dream (1984) portrayed "a visual nightmare" In which a woman stimulated by suggestive television images conjures a lover and becomes engulfed in a confusion of lust and fantasy; it won the Best Experimental Video prize at the 1985 Hollywood Erotic Film Festival.

=== Total solar eclipse and lava flow works ===
Twelve years after first witnessing and filming a total solar eclipse Gillerman began a new phase in her work, recording and reworking macrocosmic primal events around the world. In July 1991 she traveled with collaborator Rob Terry to the Island of Hawaii to record a spectacular confluence of natural events: a total solar eclipse coinciding with the eruption of an active volcano, Kilauea. She reconstituted the resulting material—views of the eclipse, horizon and surroundings (captured by a custom-designed 360-degree panning device)—into interactive installations with sculptural elements, CD-ROMs and a video, Volcanic Eclipse (1993), noted for its striking sense of light, images of neon-glowing molten lava, and unique framings of land and sky. The interactive environment, The Sun Drops its Torch (1995), was intended as a "sacred space" in which to explore the phenomena on personal, cultural and universal levels. It consisted of a semi- or full circular ring of 10–24 monitors and audio speakers, placed within a multi-user system of floor sensors that enabled viewers to reconfigure images, multilingual, indigenous stories and sounds, and fragments of the event without using a mouse or keyboard.

JoAnn Gillerman, Kilauea: Pele's Domain – 3 decades of Kilauea, film/video, immersive media, 360/virtual reality, 2019.

Gillerman continued to capture total solar eclipses and local responses to them in locations ranging from the remote Bolivian Andes (resulting in the interactive CD-ROM Intijiwana, 1996) to Siberia to Idaho in 2017, where she recorded in virtual reality/360 video. After three decades of documenting Kilauea's activity, lava flows and effects on the local population, she premiered Kilauea: Pele's Domain at the Sharjah Film Platform in 2019. The National critic Rupert Hawksley called the multi-layered, experimental film "a human story—as awe-inspiring as Kilauea is … that explores our relationship with nature, told largely through the eyes of a Hawaiian woman at an evacuation centre." Gillerman has also produced the related immersive works Illumination (2022) and Totality (2023).

=== Interactive works and exhibits ===
In the 1990s, Gillerman focused on interactive works: installations (such as The Sun Drops its Torch), performances and CD-ROMs in which she experimented with new, custom interface software and sensor-controlled environments promoting user-friendly and cooperative interaction. This work often explored boundaries between public and private, in and out, and artist and viewer. Her initial forays in this area included EROS INterACTive (1993–4), an electronic kiosk that solicited thoughts about eroticism using provocative help screens that whispered encouragements; users could videotape their own musings and see those left by others. AnArchy pARTyCAM (1993–5) was an interactive performance that recast participants as both display and object of interest using two cyberarts costumes, one with a camera and the other with the capacity to project the camera's display.

These experiments led to larger-scale interdisciplinary exhibits that Gillerman/Viper Vertex created for public museums, science centers and other venues. Innovation Forum (The Tech Museum of Innovation, San José, 1998–2010) was an exhibit that encouraged dialogue on ethics and technology between visitors (who could add their thoughts to the exhibit) and a diverse virtual panel of experts. Shadow Dance (2001–09) was a floor-pad controlled, multi-channel, multi-user exhibit at the Chabot Space and Science Center in Oakland that extended Gillerman's work on eclipses. Using floor sensors embellished by backlit images of sun, moon and earth, participants could create individual mixes of aural (scientific, personal and indigenous mythical accounts) and visual imagery of eclipses on two rows of six flat-screen monitors. Chimp Finder (2005–08) was an outdoor exhibit at the St. Louis Zoo that enabled participants to locate and identify live chimpanzees and find out about their backstories and relationships; the first of its kind, it combined a custom-designed scope, computer-aided biometrics and a touch screen display with information menus.

Since 2010, in addition to her video works on cosmic phenomena, Gillerman has focused on immersive works in virtual reality, 360 video and NFTs, BioArt involving live bioluminescent dinoflagellates, and ways to apply technology to social practice.

== Teaching and social practice ==
Gillerman is a professor at California College of the Arts, where she has taught since 1976 in areas including digital arts and new media, video and film, integrations of art and science, and game arts. In 2019, she founded Art-Pod, a non-profit organization that she directs, which brings experimental STEAM (STEM + Art) experiences and educational programs to diverse communities.

== Recognition ==
Gillerman has received grants from the National Endowment of the Arts, Rocky Mountain Regional Artist Fellowship and Cultural Arts Department of the City of Oakland. She was an artist-in-residence at Simon Fraser University, Emily Carr University of Art and Design and Metro Television in Sydney, Australia. She was featured in the PBS-KQED and KCSM broadcast "Women of Vision" with Jan Yanehiro, which aired in 1997–98. In 2013, Gillerman's video installation Egg.Birth.Flow was selected for Izmir International Art Biennial in Turkey.

Gillerman's work belongs to the public art collections of the Chabot Space and Science Center, Computer History Museum, Long Beach Museum of Art, SFMOMA, St. Louis Zoo, The Tech Museum of Innovation, Video Free America and Whitney Museum, among others.
