= Margaret Rinkovsky =

American landscape painter (born 1950)

Margaret Rinkovsky (born 1950 in Canton, Ohio) is an American landscape painter.

== Biography ==
Rinkovsky received her MFA in painting from UCLA in 1978. She was the winner of the SECA Award from the San Francisco Museum of Modern Art in 1981. She currently lives in Santa Cruz, California. According to a post on ArtSlant.com, Rinkovsky "has long found her inspiration from the art and architecture from antiquity." One of her paintings, The Unswept Floor, is related to an ancient Roman mosaic of the same name. Many of her paintings consist of metaphors that focus on social and environmental issues.

== Exhibitions ==
Some of her exhibitions are:

- 2011 - "Recent Paintings from ‘The Unswept Floor Series'" - Lobby Gallery, San Francisco, CA
- 2009 - "A Selection of Recent Paintings" - The Carl Cherry Center for the Arts, Carmel, CA
- 1998 - "Star Charts" - Carnegie Arts Center, Turlock, CA
- 1995 - "Margaret Rinkovsky: ‘The Odyssey Landscapes Reconsidered’” - The Art Museum of Santa Cruz County
- 1991 - "The Power of Line" - Seventy-nine drawings by 38 different artists - Koplin Gallery, Santa Monica, CA
- 1990 - "Temporal Structures: Recent Paintings" - San Jose Institute of Contemporary Art, San Jose, CA
- 1989 - "The Poetics of Light" paintings - Michael Dunev Gallery, San Francisco, CA
- 1988 - "Sundials & Arches, 1983-1988" - Plaza Gallery, Bank of America World Headquarters, San Francisco, CA
- 1987 - "Paintings: A Five Year Selection" - Eloise Packard Smith Gallery, University of California Santa Cruz
- 1984 - "Paintings and Works on Paper" - Pamela Auchincloss Gallery, Santa Barbara, CA
- 1981 - "SECA Award Exhibition” - San Francisco Museum of Modern Art
