= Susan O'Malley (artist) =

American artist, curator (1976–2015)

Susan Bruce O'Malley
- Born: Susan O'Malley; 1976; United States
- Died: February 25, 2015 (38); Berkeley, California, United States
- Education: California College of the Arts, Stanford University
- Spouse: Tim Caro-Bruce
- Children: 2

Susan O’Malley (1976 – 2015) was an American artist and curator, from the San Francisco Bay Area, and author of the 2016 book Advice from My 80 Year-Old Self.

== Life ==
Susan O'Malley was raised in a large Irish-Mexican family in San Jose, California. She attended Presentation High School, class of 1995.

O’Malley received her B.A. degree in 1999 in urban studies from Stanford University; and M.F.A. degree in 2006 in social practice from California College of the Arts.

While working as the curator and print center director at the San Jose Institute of Contemporary Art (from 2006 until 2011) O’Malley oversaw the production of over 50 exhibitions and programs. As an artist she exhibited work at various locations including at the Contemporary Art Museum Houston, the Parthenon Museum (Nashville, TN), and Montalvo Art Center. She exhibited her public art projects in San Francisco, New York, and London, Poland and Denmark.

== Work ==
O'Malley's work is largely text-based and has taken the form of posters, buttons, and billboards.

In an interview with Content Magazine from 2013 O'Malley said of her inspiration "I’m intrigued by the idea of how and where we live, how we relate to each other, and our physical environment."

San Francisco Arts Quarterly critic Leora Lutz noted that her work appeared "in every avenue of the public imaginable, from front lawns, to billboards, to garden walks as well as galleries and museums." and Los Angeles Magazine's Street Art Spotter, Eva Glettner, called Susan "an artist of the streets."

A 2005 foray into performance paired her with fellow-Stanford alum Christina Amini to form "a motivational team, wearing red 'Pep Talk Squad' jackets that O’Malley created. which according to then director Christian L. Frock "offered scheduled pep talks to the public at Pro Arts".

She worked with independent publishers The Thing Quarterley on multiple commissions, including a tote bag that read "Less Internet More Love" and their 2013 collaboration with Levi’s, Moment to Moment, which commissioned art for advertisement spaces in subway stations in New York and San Francisco.

Her final series of work Advice From My 80-Year Old Self was created in conjunction with a local youth group who helped interview people on the San Pablo Corridor in Berkeley, California. According to Parade Magazine she "asked them to imagine themselves as their kindliest, wisest 80-year-old self and give a piece of heartfelt advice." The series was created in conjunction with Kala Arts Institute which displayed the works as public art. In January 2016 the series became a book of the same name published by Chronicle Books and prints were installed in the San Francisco Museum of Modern Art in the Fall of that same year.

== Death ==
She had tried to have children for two years with her husband Tim Caro-Bruce. Three days before she was scheduled to give birth to twins via c-section at the age of 38, she collapsed on February 25, 2015 at her home in Berkeley and never regained consciousness. She died along with her two daughters, Lucy and Reyna. A public memorial service for her was held at Villa Montalvo on March 9, 2015.
