= Kamau Amu Patton =

American artist and educator (born 1972)

Kamau Amu Patton (born in 1972) is a multidisciplinary American artist and educator. He makes works independently and as part of the performance collective founded by Terry Adkins, Lone Wolf Recital Corps. Patton is also an Associate Professor in the Visual & Critical Studies department at the School of the Art Institute of Chicago and on the Bard MFA faculty.

== Early life and education ==
Patton was born in 1972. He graduated from the University of Pennsylvania with a sociology degree and received his MFA from Stanford University in 2007.

== Career ==
In 2008, his work Design and the Elastic Mind was exhibited at the Museum of Modern Art (MoMA). In 2010, Patton won the SECA Art Award from the San Francisco Museum of Modern Art. In 2010-2011, he was an artist-in-residence at the Studio Museum in Harlem.

In 2011, Patton created a reinterpretation of the "T" logo for The New York Times as part of an initiative by The New York Times Style Magazine. His work was shown as part of the Pacific Standard Time Performance and Public Art Festival in 2012, and he has presented new sound work as part of the exhibition/sound series, "Art Forms of Dimensions Tomorrow," at Skidmore College's Tang Teaching Museum. In 2015, he exhibited a series of untitled works at the Callicoon Fine Arts Gallery in New York.

Patton took part in a series of multidisciplinary performances as part of the performance collective founded by Terry Adkins, Lone Wolf Recital Corps, first with Blanche Bruce in 2013 then with Charles Gaines and Clifford Owens at MoMA in 2017. In 2017, he staged his work Amun (The Unseen Legends) at MoMA, with him improvising sound to his 2010 abstract film Theory of Colors.

In 2019, Patton was selected for the Storm King residency program at the Storm King Art Center, and he was a 2020 ESS Archive Artist in Residence at the Experimental Sound Studio. In 2020, he was awarded a $100,000 grant from Creative Capital for his project Tel.
