= James Torlakson =

American artist (born 1951)

- Born: February 19, 1951 (age 75); San Francisco, California, United States
- Education: California College of the Arts (BA), San Francisco State University (MFA)
- Occupations: Visual artist, educator
- Known for: Printmaking, painting
- Relatives: Tom Torlakson (brother)
- Website: jamestorlakson.com

James "Jim" Daniel Torlakson (born February 19, 1951) is an American visual artist and educator, known for his photorealist oil paintings, watercolors and aquatint intaglio prints. He is based in Pacifica, California, a coastal city near San Francisco.

== Early life and family ==
James Daniel Torlakson was born in San Francisco, California on February 19, 1951. His brother is American politician Tom Torlakson. Growing up in the Westlake neighborhood of Daly City, Torlakson moved to Pacifica in 1971 where he has lived since becoming a professional artist. He started drawing at an early age, encouraged by his parents, who entered a drawing of his in the San Francisco Chronicle "Daily Junior Art Champion" when he was six years old; he was awarded first prize. He was also inspired by artist George Post, a Californian watercolor painter, who was his grandparents' neighbor in Oakland, California.

Torlakson studied general fine arts and received a B.F.A. degree in 1971 from the California College of the Arts, before completing a Masters of Arts degree in 1975 at San Francisco State University.

His daughter Elizabeth died at age 21, after walking into a BART tunnel in 2004.

== Work ==
He was a professor of printmaking and visual art at City College of San Francisco, from 1999 to 2017. Other teaching experience also includes California College of the Arts and Skyline College.

Torlakson’s photorealism imagery have centered on “every day” America, which includes images of trucks, railways, amusement parks, waterfronts, fireworks booths, deserted drive-in theaters and coastal landscapes. His oils, watercolors, aquatint etchings and drawings have been exhibited nationally since 1971 within United States and internationally.

He has works housed in the collections of many American museums, including the San Francisco Museum of Modern Art, the Oakland Museum of California, the Brooklyn Museum, Rhode Island School of Design Museum; New York Public Library’s print collection, the Art Institute of Chicago, Carnegie Museum of Art, the Achenbach Foundation for Graphic Arts, Library of Congress, Denver Art Museum, and the DeCordova Sculpture Park and Museum.
