= Sandra Vivanco =

Peruvian architect (died 2020)

Sandra Vivanco (died March 31, 2020) was a Peruvian-born architect, educator, writer, and professor at the California College of the Arts. She practiced architecture in Japan, Portugal, Peru, Italy, Mexico and Brazil.

== Education ==
Vivanco was born in Lima, Peru, and received her undergraduate education from the University of California, Berkeley, in 1985 and her Master of Architectures from Columbia University's Graduate School of Architecture, Planning and Preservation in 1991. She taught at Barnard College and Columbia University in New York, UC Berkeley, Escola da Cidade in São Paulo and Universidad Ricardo Palma in Lima and was associate professor of Architecture and Diversity Studies and co-director of the CCA BuildLab at the California College of the Arts.

== Career ==
Vivanco founded her San Francisco-based architecture firm A+D (Architecture + Design) in 1994. The firm prioritized housing and affordable community building was the central focus of the firm's work. As one of only a few Latinx-owned architecture firms in the country, A+D explored cultural identity representation as design inspiration for new and invigorated public spaces.

Vivanco practiced architecture in Japan, Portugal, Italy, and Brazil and taught at Barnard College and Columbia University and, from 1994 to 2020, at UC Berkeley and California College of the Arts in California.

Vivanco's design practice was selected Architect of Community as one of 10 Architects to Watch featured in California Home & Design magazine in 2010. In 2017, she received the Education Award in the AIA San Francisco Community Alliance Awards program. She was the Architect of Record for The Mexican Museum in San Francisco, due to open in 2020. A recent project includes the permanent built interventions by her students at Plaza Adelante - a community service and art center for LatinX immigrants.

Vivanco also focused on raising awareness of Latin and South American women architects since the mid-1990s. This includes curating exhibitions and publications. "Latin America: A New Generation of Women Architects" is an online exhibition of contemporary women practicing in Latin America. Two recent publications include chapters in Transculturation, Cities, Spaces and Architectures in Latin America and Baroque New Worlds: Representation, Transculturation, Counterconquest. After the award of the Lebrun Travel Grant in 2018, Vivanco went to Mexico to document the work of Clara Porset published as an article From Resort to Gallery: Nation Building in Clara Porset's Interior Spaces.

== Awards ==
2018 AIANY Stewardson Keefe Lebrun Travel Grant

2019 ACSA Diversity Achievement In 2019, Sandra was Awarded the National Diversity Achievement Award by the Association of Collegiate Schools of Architecture. It recognizes "the work of faculty, administrators, or students in creating effective methods and models to achieve greater diversity in curricula, school personnel, and student bodies, specifically to incorporate the participation and contributions of historically under-represented groups or contexts." Recipients are chosen based on the positive stimulating influence they have had on diversity within architecture education, schools, and/or the community at large.

== Legacy ==
In 2020, the California College of the Arts established the Sandra Vivanco Diversity Scholarship in honour of Sandra Vivanco and her advocacy for underrepresented groups in architecture and design. The scholarship supports students at the college, with a focus on women of colour, non-binary, transgender, and DACA / Dreamer students experiencing financial need.
