= Roger C. Field =

English inventor

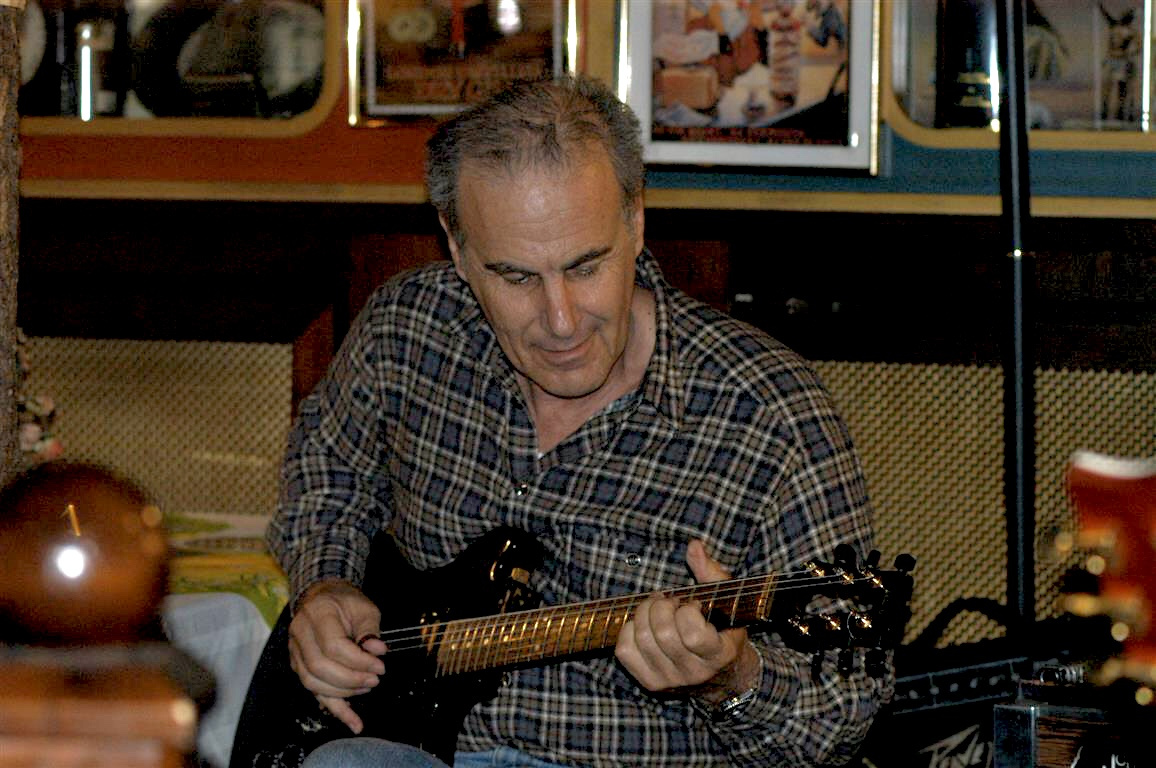
- Born: 31 July 1945 (age 81); London, England
- Education: California College of Arts and Crafts, San Francisco State University
- Occupations: Industrial designer, inventor, musician, filmmaker
- Awards: Designers' Choice Award for the United States (1980)

Roger C. Field (born 31 July 1945) is an English designer and the inventor of the Foldaxe folding electric guitar, which won the Designers' Choice Award for the United States in 1980. He is also an inventor with over 100 patents, an industrial designer, and a guitarist. He has been written about in Playboy magazine 21 times in 16 countries, in Penthouse magazine four times in Europe, and in Esquire. He is in four different Who's Who books in Europe, including one for the European Union.

== Early life ==
Field was born in London, England. His father was the owner and managing director of Siegmund Robinow & Son Ltd., a company in London and Hamburg, which at that time manufactured exclusive garments. After attending Stagenhoe Park near Hitchin from 1953–1958; he attended The King's School, Canterbury, from 1958–1960; then Aiglon College in Switzerland from 1960–1963.

Field attended the California College of Arts and Crafts (now California College of the Arts) in Oakland, California, early in 1965, to major in industrial design and graduated with a bachelor's degree. Field also completed courses in film and television at San Francisco State University.

In 1969, he filmed the California College of the Arts at the request of Harry X. Ford, the president of the college, in 16 mm (titled To Be An Artist), which included poet Michael McClure, an English professor at CCAC at the time. The film, which was financed by the college, was later shown on television.

Field, who was also an aviation enthusiast who had received a private pilot license with a multi-engine rating in California, then moved to Munich to work on the newly formed Airbus project, contributing to the interior design of the aircraft. While in Munich, Field developed drill units to try to reduce the risk of cross-contamination for the dental industry (U.S. patent 5,599,184 and other patents).

Field is currently marketing his professional 35 mm film camera invention for cinema and television. The camera uses unperforated 35-mm film (which allows much wider exposed images), (U.S. patent 7,419,077). The camera could be used with Field's camera light screening unit (matte box), which has been manufactured for many years by the Chrosziel Filmtechnik company in Germany (U.S. patent 4,441,794).

== Foldaxe ==
While designing passenger seats for the Airbus in 1975, Field had the idea for a folding electric guitar, which he named "Foldaxe" for being able to be transported as hand luggage under an aircraft seat. Guitarist Chet Atkins inspired Field in 1975 to design a folding guitar without the string tension changing and going out of tune. Field addresses it by designing a mechanism hidden in the guitar which, once the guitar has been tuned, keeps the string tension constant when folding and unfolding.

Atkins appeared with Les Paul on television with the Foldaxe on Jane Pauley's The Today Show and on Entertainment This Week. Field appeared several times on television shows with the Foldaxe. The Foldaxe was reviewed in Industrial Design magazine, winning the Designers' Choice Award sponsored by I. D. in 1980. In 1980, industrial designer Raymond Loewy sent Field a letter congratulating him on the design of the Foldaxe. The Foldaxe was featured in Atkins's book Me and My Guitars. They have been played by Keith Richards, Mick Jagger, Eric Clapton, Lenny Breau, Paco de Lucia, John McLaughlin, Hank Marvin, Paul McCartney, David Copperfield, James Burton and Albert Lee.

The interest in The Foldaxe by Hank Marvin, guitarist for the Shadows, led Field to be the instigator in 2001 of the reunion of the Shadows. Jet Harris of the Shadows addressed Field's intention to do so in the Otago Daily Times, after meeting with Field and Bruce Welch near Tilburg in the Netherlands. Harris and Welch supported Field's efforts to influence Hank Marvin to return to the band.

Field developed a guitar technique he calls 'Tap-Picking', a technique of adding additional bass notes to guitar fingerpicking by tapping and pulling-off the bass strings with the left hand at times when the right hand thumbpick and fingers are on the treble strings and cannot play bass notes.

In the text of his tablature booklet with the LP Dadi's Picking Lights Up Nashville, Volume 1, Marcel Dadi cited Field's playing ability as inspiration for the tune Roger Chesterfield.
