= Kala Art Institute =

Nonprofit arts organization in Berkeley

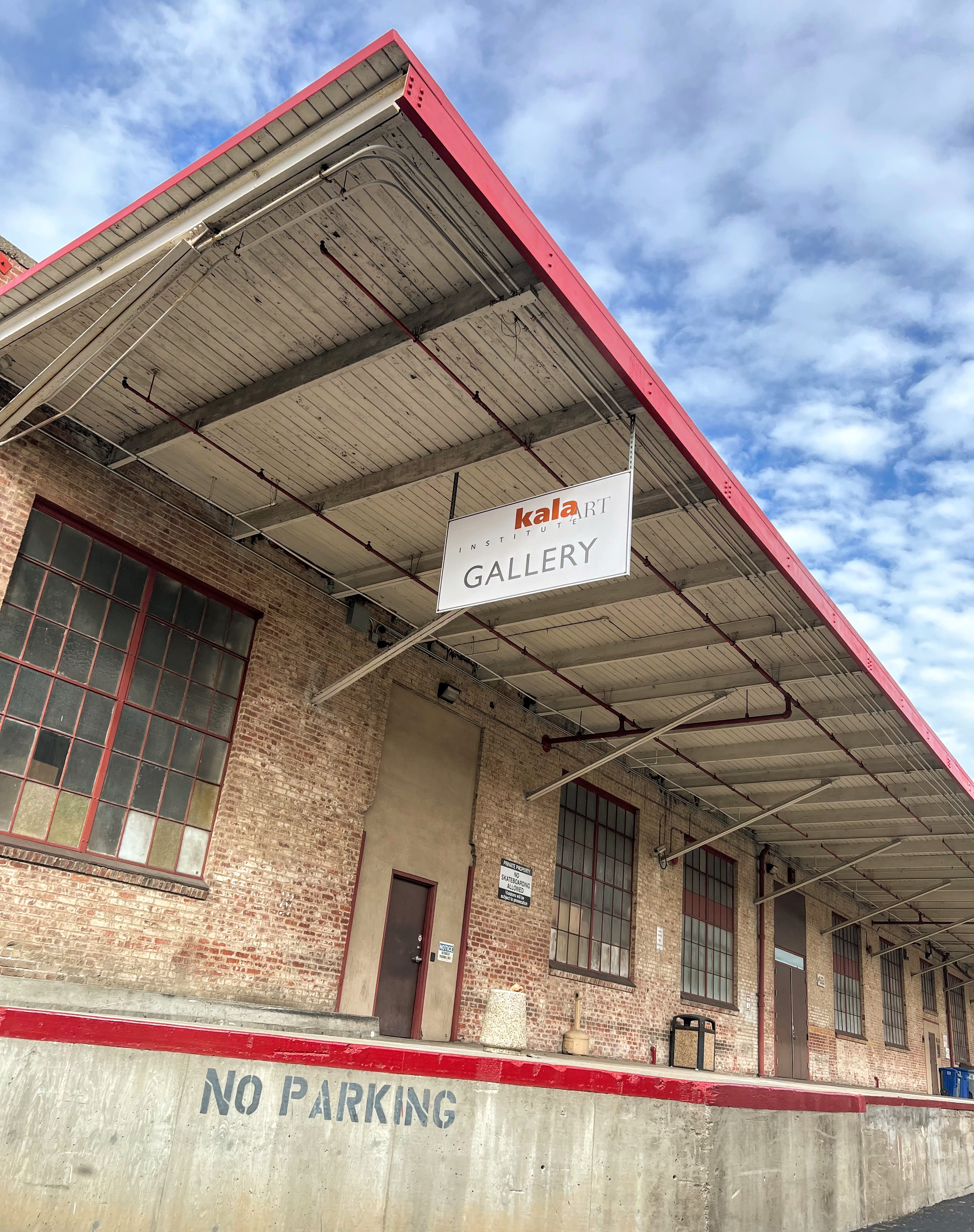
- Kala Art Institute gallery (2021)
- Formation: 1974; 52 years ago
- Founder: Archana Horsting, Yuzo Nakano
- Type: arts non-profit
- Headquarters: 2990 San Pablo Avenue, Berkeley, California, U.S.
- Website: http://www.kala.org/

Kala Art Institute is a community arts non-profit organization, artist residency, art classes, and an art gallery, founded in 1974, and located in two locations in Berkeley, California.

== About ==
They offer facilities for printmaking, photography, and book arts. Classes include etching, letterpress, and bookbinding. The studio building is located at 1060 Heinz Avenue in an industrial building and was a former Heinz ketchup factory. The art gallery space is located at 2990 San Pablo Avenue and is 2,200 square feet, this secondary space was from an expansion in 2009.

It is estimated that Kala Art Institute serves between 25,000 and 35,000 people a year.

== History ==
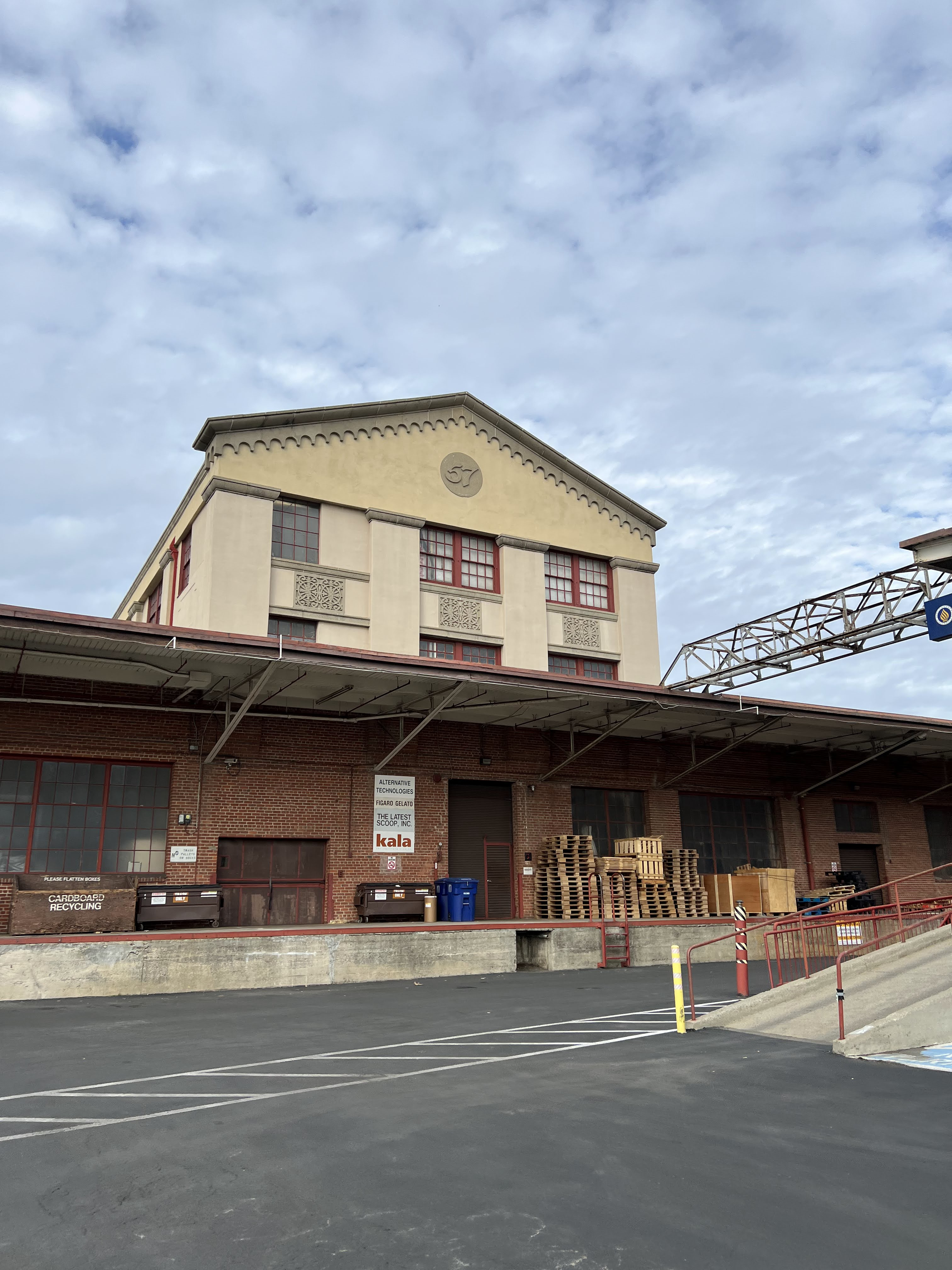
Kala Art Institute

Kala Art Institute was founded as an international and community arts space in 1974, by printmakers Archana Horsting and Yuzo Nakano. Horsting and Nakano met while studying at Atelier 17, under Krishna Reddy and Stanley William Hayter. The first facility for Kala started on Wilmot Street in Japantown, San Francisco; with a single etching press with a hot plate. Six months after first opening, they moved Kala to Ashby Street (near Ashby BART) in Berkeley in order to gain more space. In 1976, Kala became a 501(c)3 organization.

In 2009, the Oakland Museum of California held the exhibition, “Evolution of Print: Artists of Kala,” at the Oakland International Airport. Artists associated with Kala Art Institute have included Squeak Carnwath, Roy De Forest, Margaret Herscher, Jessica Dunne, Bella Feldman, Barbara Foster, Sonya Rapoport, Peter Voulkos, and William T. Wiley.
