= Adrien Segal =

American artist (born 1985)

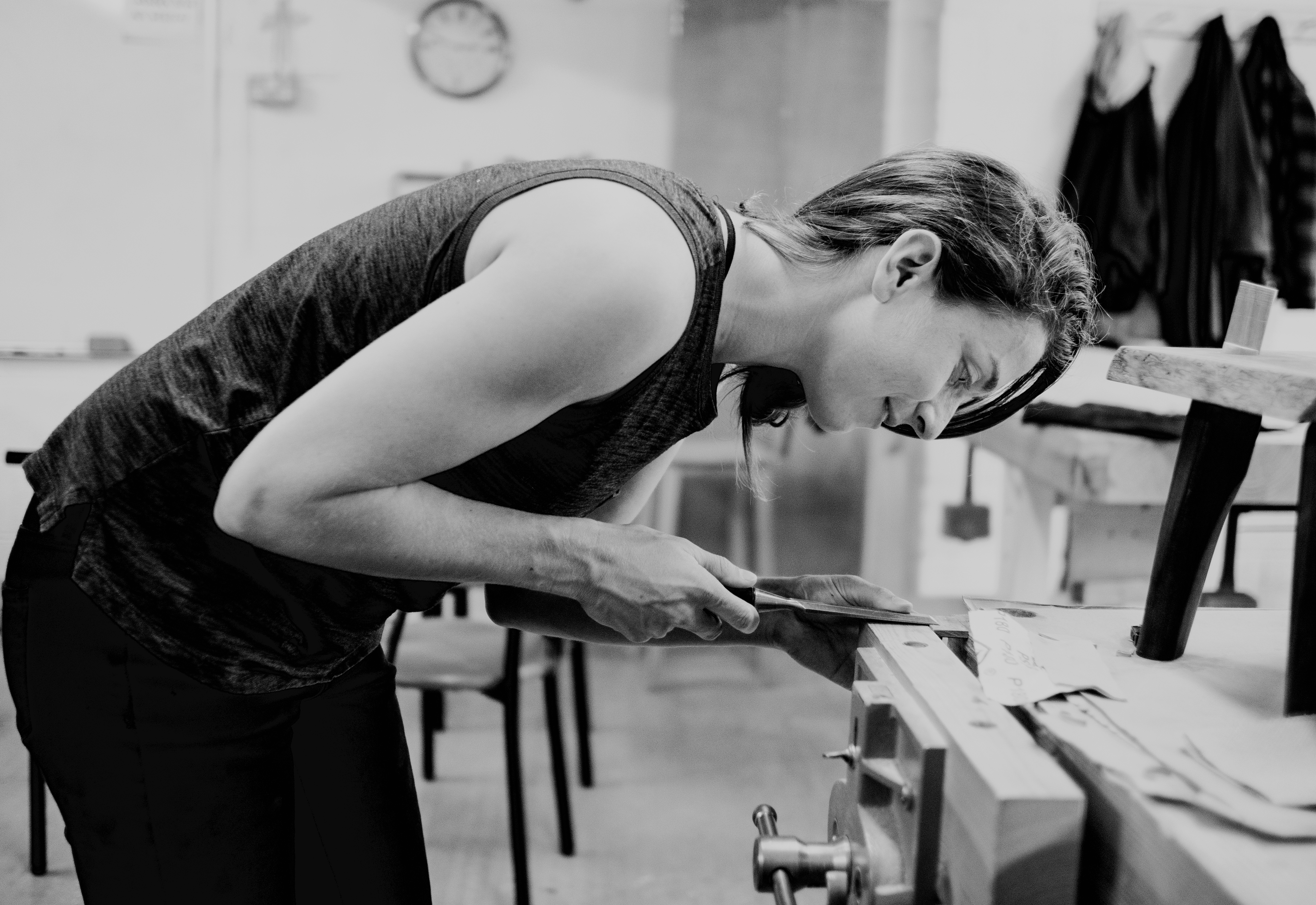
Adrien Segal

Adrien Segal (born 1985 in California) is an American artist, furniture maker, and sculptor, who uses data to inform her artwork. She is currently an adjunct professor of Furniture Design at the California College of the Arts and a practicing artist studio furniture maker.

== Education ==
Adrien Segal attended California College of the Arts in San Francisco, California, for her undergraduate degree, receiving a BFA in Furniture Design in 2007.

== Career ==
In her creative practice, Segal is a data sculptor who works with physical materials that reflect the ebb and flow of water in various manifestations. She often works with wood and metal, and she has a background in furniture design. She is interested in drawing attention to environmental changes through art. In order to create her pieces, she employs a combination of hand sculpting and technology, finishing pieces by hand. Her work has drawn from data from national water consumption statistics, 30 years of annual snowfall levels, and tidal patterns in the San Francisco Bay. She uses this scientific research to create physical sculptural forms that evoke a sensory experience to engage dialogue about changes in our natural environment.

Segal has exhibited work at the Richmond Art Center, Biblioteca Henestrosa in Oaxaca, Mexico, the Oakland Museum of California, and Ballroom Marfa in Texas. Her work has also been published in several books. Segal has held Artist Residencies at Oregon College of Art and Craft in Portland, the Bunnell Art Center in Alaska, and the Lucid Arts Foundation in Northern California, and Autodesk's Pier 9 Workshop in San Francisco. She was CCA's Wornick Distinguished Visiting Professor of Wood Arts in 2015 and has held visiting artist positions at San Diego State University, Oregon College of Art and Craft, and the University of the Arts. In addition to teaching, she pursues a creative practice out of her studio on the former Naval Base in Alameda, California.

Segal's work is included in the permanent collection of the Center for Art in Wood.

Tidal Datum of Kachemak Bay, a sculpture by Segal, commissioned by the City of Homer, AK

== Projects ==
=== Tidal Datum ===
Scientific American has described Segal's Tidal Datum as "spectacular" with "unbeatable beauty and wonder." This piece was inspired by Sutro Baths, a seaside bathhouse located in San Francisco established in the 1920s where waters change with the tides. In order to create this piece, Segal used data obtained from the tide charts of the San Francisco Bay from the National Oceanic and Atmospheric Administration for the 29-day lunar cycle of in the months of April and May in 2006. As a result of this project, she has been inspired to create other pieces displaying the tide patterns of the Louisiana coast and of Homer, Alaska. Segal's 2006 Tidal Datum Table was featured on the cover of the book 500 Tables.

=== Snow Water Equivalent Cabinet ===
Drawing on snow survey data collected by the Natural Resources Conservation Service collected from 1980 to 2010 in the Western US and Alaska, this project looks at the change in snow water equivalent over time. Each drawer of the cabinet varies in depth and height based on the amount of snow water for a given year. It is a striking work built from ebonized ash and carved plywood and is currently in a private collection.
