= Mary Snowden =

American visual artist (born 1940)

- Born: 1940 (age 85–86); Johnstown, Pennsylvania, U.S.
- Education: Brown University (BA), University of California, Berkeley (MFA)
- Occupations: Painter, educator
- Awards: SECA Art Award (1974)

Mary Snowden (born 1940) is an American painter and educator. She is known for works that use humor to explore issues of feminist identity and consumerism.

== Early life and education ==
Snowden was born in 1940 in Johnstown, Pennsylvania. She received a BA degree from Brown University, and a MFA degree from the University of California, Berkeley.

== Career ==
Snowden is perhaps best known for her works about the suburbs and motherhood. Starting in the mid-1990s Snowden's paintings utilized 1940s and 1950s advertising imagery, focusing on the products, images, and fashions of the era to humorously critique limitations in cultural ideas about gender and homemaking. Around 2010, she started used stitching to depict rural farm life.

Snowden was the first female artist to win the SECA Art Award from the San Francisco Museum of Modern Art in 1974. Snowden is Professor Emeritus of Painting Drawing at the California College of the Arts.

Snowden's notable past exhibitions have been at the San Francisco Museum of Modern Art (1975), Gallery Henoch (1991), and the Braunstein/Quay Gallery (1997). Her work is in museum collections including the Kemper Art Museum, Fine Arts Museums of San Francisco, di Rosa Center for Contemporary Art, among others.
