= Josh Faught =

American fiber artist (born 1979)

- Born: 1979 (age 45–46); St. Louis, Missouri, U.S.
- Education: Oberlin College, Fashion Institute of Technology, School of the Art Institute of Chicago
- Occupation(s): Fiber artist, sculptor, painter, educator

Josh Faught (born 1979), is an American fiber artist and educator, who creates sculptures, textiles, collages, and paintings. His work incorporates techniques such as knitting, crochet, and weaving, and addresses topics of craft and queer history. His fiber sculptures, influenced by both domestic crafts and art styles such as abstract and color field painting, are often either hung on the wall or stretched over scaffolding such as garden trellises; they are three-dimensional but forward-oriented. He is San Francisco based.

== Education ==
Josh Faught was born in 1979, in St. Louis, Missouri. Faught graduated from Oberlin College in 2001. He earned an AAS degree in textile and surface design from the Fashion Institute of Technology (FIT) in 2004; and an MFA degree in fiber and material studies from the School of the Art Institute of Chicago (SIAC) in 2006.

== Career ==
In 2012, the work It Takes a Lifetime to Get Exactly Where You Are included a section that used weaving to replicate a segment of the AIDS Memorial Quilt. It Takes a Lifetime evokes the mixed history of the feminist craft revival of the 1970s and the concurrent AIDS crisis. It also assesses the legacy of the AIDS Memorial Quilt, which was criticized during its early years for sentimentality and a lack of political direction. It Takes a Lifetime recognizes the "grassroots networks for caregiving and other support that are not easily integrated into official histories and are often subject to dismissal as merely creative, ameliorative, or apolitical."

In 2013, Faught, commissioned by the San Francisco Museum of Modern Art, created an installation for the Neptune Society Columbarium in San Francisco. The major element, Untitled (2013) consisted of a large panel, both woven and crocheted, hung from the central archway of the Columbarium. The panel incorporated various objects that mimicked offerings left by the niches, such as plastic food, pins, and greeting cards. Untitled (2013) addresses issues of memorialization in a sympathetic and irreverent manner. Of the project, Faught said: “Really ordinary objects can resonate on a deeply personal level. They can archive someone in a really idiosyncratic and unusual way.”

According to the article, Fiber Art: The Queer Kid on the Bus by Steven Frost, "approaches the impediments of feminism, hobby craft, and queer history with a sense of reverence and anxiety." His artwork represents the hardships of gay individuals and fiber artists to conform in our society while staying innovative.

Faught serves as an associate professor, and the chair of the textiles department at California College of the Arts.

== Exhibitions ==
2019

Mr. Kramer’s Dream House, Casa Loewe, London, England

2018

Josh Faught (solo presentation), Frieze London, London, England

2017

Sanctuary, St. Mark’s Cathedral, commissioned by Western Bridge, Seattle, Washington

2015

Josh Faught (solo presentation), NADA Art Fair, Miami, Florida

2014

Christmas Creep, Lisa Cooley Gallery, New York, New York

I know I came into this room for a reason, Kendall Koppe Gallery, Glasgow, Scotland

The Mauve Decade, Launch Pad commission, London, England

2013

BE BOLD for what you stand for, BE CAREFUL for what you fall for, Neptune Society Columbarium, commissioned by SFMoMA, San Francisco, California (SECA Art Award)

Snacks, Supports, and Something to Rally Around, Contemporary Art Museum, St. Louis, Missouri

Josh Faught (solo presentation), Artissima Art Fair, Turin, Italy
