= Bryan Nash Gill =

American artist (1961–2013)

Bryan Nash Gill (November 3, 1961 – May 17, 2013) was an American visual artist who worked primarily with wood, in the form of relief prints and sculptures.

== Early life ==
Gill was born in 1961 in Hartford, Connecticut and was raised on a farm in Granby, Connecticut. He attended Westminster School and graduated in 1980. In 1984 he graduated from Tulane University in New Orleans where he earned a Bachelor of Fine Arts, with a focus on glassblowing. He moved to Italy to learn stone carving before returning to the United States to study at the California College of the Arts. He graduated with a Master of Fine Arts in 1988.

== Career ==
Although Gill began his art career in glassblowing, ceramics and landscape drawing, he gradually turned to sculpture. His early works were mainly abstract metal sculptures, but over time he increasingly began to work with wood instead of metal. He briefly lived in New York City but returned to New Hartford, Connecticut, where he constructed a two-story studio adjoining his house in 1998 from wood timbered from his own property. One of Gill's first works after he resettled in Connecticut was a sculpture composed of 42 upside-down hanging Christmas trees. Some of his other sculptures include Twins (2000), a bronze cast of two conjoined saplings, and Blow Down (2002), a skinned and flattened spruce tree mounted on a wall.

Gill began creating woodcuts from tree cross-sections in 2004. Most of his woodcuts were created from dead or damaged tree parts that he collected and took to his studio to prepare cross-sections of the wood for relief printing. In 2012, Princeton Architectural Press published Woodcut, a book which displays a selection of Gill's prints; it was named one of The New York Times Magazine's best books of the year. An exhibition by the same name, composed of 30 of Gill's prints, was displayed at the Chicago Botanic Garden in early 2013. He created prints from a large variety of trees, of which the oldest was a fallen 200-year-old chestnut tree once planted by Frederick Law Olmsted.

Gill's work has been displayed at the New Britain Museum of American Art and DeCordova Museum and Sculpture Park, and he was commissioned to create installations for Expo 2005 in Japan and the World Financial Center in New York. He was a fellow of the California Arts Council and twice received grants from the Connecticut Commission on the Arts. He was profiled in Martha Stewart Living in 2012 and was the focus of a documentary video produced by the magazine.

== Personal life ==
Gill died on May 17, 2013, "unexpectedly of natural causes" at the age of 52. He was married to Gina Gill (née Kiss) for 12 years, and they had a son named Forest.

== Bibliography ==
- Woodcut (2012), Princeton Architectural Press, ISBN 978-1-616-89048-3
