= Squeak Carnwath =

American artist (born 1947)

- Born: 1947 (age 78–79); Abington, Pennsylvania, United States
- Education: California College of Arts and Crafts, Goddard College
- Known for: Painting, Printmaking, book art
- Notable work: The Story of Painting (1999)
- Awards: Flintridge Foundation Award for Visual Artists (2001), Guggenheim Fellowship (1994), National Endowment for the Arts (1985, 1980)
- Website: www.squeakcarnwath.com

Squeak Carnwath (born 1947) is an American contemporary painter and arts educator. She is a professor emerita of art at the University of California, Berkeley. She has a studio in Oakland, California, where she has lived and worked since 1970.

== Early life and education ==
Carnwath was born on 1947 in Abington, Pennsylvania. She has explained "Squeak" as "a childhood name that stuck".

After high school, Carnwath studied art in Illinois, Greece, and Vermont before attending the California College of Arts and Crafts, where she studied ceramics, painting, and sculpture with Viola Frey, Art Nelson, Jay DeFeo, and Dennis Leon. She received her MFA from California College of Arts and Crafts in 1977.

== Work ==
Carnwath has a distinctive and recognizable style which combines diaristic and personal elements with universal or existential themes. Her paintings "combine text and images on abstract fields of color to express sociopolitical and spiritual concerns."

Carnwath has described herself ironically as a "painting chauvinist" due to an abiding preference for that medium, although she is also an accomplished printmaker and has created sophisticated Jacquard tapestries, artist books, and mixed media works in addition to her oil and alkyd works on canvas.

Soon after graduating with an MFA, Carnwath began to receive recognition for her work. She received a Visual Arts Fellowship grant from the National Endowment for the Arts and a SECA Art Award in 1980 from the San Francisco Museum of Modern Art, which included a solo exhibition at the museum. The exhibition featured a large sculptural installation titled My Own Ghost. Works on paper related to the My Own Ghost series were also included.

Following the exhibition, Carnwath focused on paintings and works on paper. Early 1980s artworks included interior scenes, stylized figures, and everyday objects like cups and vases, with titles often painted into wide borders. Her work was exhibited at Goldeen Gallery in San Francisco and Van Straaten Gallery in Chicago.

In 1994, Carnwath was awarded the Guggenheim fellowship from the John Simon Guggenheim Memorial Foundation. Carnwath was awarded the Lee Krasner Award from the Pollock-Krasner Foundation in its 2018-19 grant cycle. She was inducted into the National Academy of Design along with 15 others in the class of 2019. National Academicians are nominated and selected by over 430 living members, and the honor recognizes each artist's contributions to American culture.

=== Repeating iconography ===
While Carnwath's icons have shifted over the course of her career, they play an essential role in her compositions. The icons symbolize various elements of culture and history, and blend Carnwath's personal history with universal topics of humanity. Some represent the passing of time, others represent luck, and still others refer to the body and the mind. But rather than ascribe a defined set of meanings, Carnwath leaves room for the viewer to interpret the paintings and prints in their own way. In an interview with author and curator Karen Tsujimoto, she stated "There are subtexts, which are the real texts, and then there are the things like the 'story line,' the thing you thought you saw, but it wasn't the real information."

In the mid-1980s, Carnwath produced a series of works based on dog toys including balls, bones, a hand, and a Kong toy.

In an essay for a 2001 Flintridge Foundation catalog, Noriko Gamblin describes the evolution of Carnwath's approach to composition and subject matter:

Although Carnwath quickly established a distinctive personal style, some aspects of her work have undergone gradual transformations. The strongly geometric structure— characterized by grids, quadrants, and contrasting color bands and fields—of her paintings of the 1980s and early 1990s has loosened into more fluid arrangements of diverse elements, which include structural motifs as well as "decorative" patterns. Similarly, her iconography, which was initially tied to a relatively circumscribed personal symbology, has both expanded and grown more allusive. The early lists, litanies, injunctions, and poetic observations have been joined by more casual notations, which often lend a topical immediacy to her work.

=== Use of text in paintings ===
Text appears in many of Carnwath's paintings, works on paper, and prints. In an interview with Bart Schneider, she explained " Language kind of messes things up. That's what I like about it. I like that it slows us down. It's incremental. First the letters, then the words, then a phrase, a sentence, a paragraph. Language confounds the image. It calls into question what we think we already know."

=== List paintings ===
During the 1990s, Carnwath created series of list paintings, which included paintings describing color, gender norms, and fears, among other topics. Many of the paintings follow a similar format, with a list of associated words grouped in one portion of the canvas, and colors or imagery charted on the remaining portion. For example, the words slime, jade, salad, and sickness are included in a list above swatches of green in the color painting Things Green. Reflecting on the painting What White Is, Tsujimoto writes "Carnwath has produced a visual analogy of humankind's attempt to impose structure and order on unruly meaning."

=== Song paintings ===
As a continuation of her list-making practice, Carnwath produced a series of paintings containing song titles set in blocks of color starting around 2014. Read as a text, the song titles provide a perspective on contemporary music, personal taste, and the way songs can be connected or arranged to create new meaning. In an Art in America review, critic Tatiana Istomina stated "the found poetry of individual song titles accumulates to powerful effect. In Girls (2015), for example, the titles painted in various shades of pink, red and purple reflect many different aspects of gender, from innate character to performative identity to social function: "I Was Born This Way," "Bang Bang,""Piece of My Heart,""I Am Woman."

== Teaching ==
From 1983 to 1998, Carnwath was Professor of Art at the University of California, Davis. During this time, the art department faculty included Wayne Thiebaud, Mike Henderson, Manuel Neri, Roland Petersen, and Lynn Hershman Leeson, among others.

In 1998, Carnwath moved from the UC Davis campus to UC Berkeley. There, her colleagues included Craig Nagasawa, Katherine Sherwood, Richard Shaw and Randy Hussong, among others. She retired in 2010. She taught at the University of California, Berkeley from 1982 until 2010, having previously taught at California College of Arts and Crafts and Ohlone College.

== Solo exhibitions ==
- 2025: Squeak Carnwath, pt.2 Gallery, Oakland, CA
- 2022: Pattern Language, Jane Lombard Gallery, New York City, New York
- 2020: Unveiling Territory, James Harris Gallery, Seattle, Washington
- 2019: Not All Black and White, Jane Lombard Gallery, New York
- 2019: Squeak Carnwath: How the Mind Works, Frederick R. Weisman Museum of Art, Pepperdine University, Malibu, California
- 2016: Everyday is Not the Same: Squeak Carnwath's Prints and Papers, Jordan Schnitzer Museum of Art, Eugene, Oregon
- 2016: Crazy Papers and Sister Objects, American University Museum, Katzen Arts Center, Washington, D.C.
- 2015: What Before Comes After, Jane Lombard Gallery, New York, New York
- 2011: Squeak Carnwath: All Thought and Pleasure, Triton Museum of Art, Santa Clara, California
- 2009: Squeak Carnwath: Painting Is No Ordinary Object, Oakland Museum of California, Oakland, California
- 2004: Squeak Carnwath Being Human: Paintings & Prints, Olin Art Gallery, Kenyon College, Gambier, Ohio
- 2000: Squeak Carnwath, David Beitzel Gallery, New York City, New York
- 1998: Squeak Carnwath: Seeing in the Dark, California Museum of Art, Luther Burbank Center for the Arts, Santa Rosa, California
- 1986: Squeak Carnwath: New Paintings and Works on Paper, Van Straaten Gallery, Chicago, Illinois
- 1984: Squeak Carnwath: Paintings, Getler/Pall/Saper Gallery, New York City, New York
- 1982: Squeak Carnwath, Hansen Fuller Goldeen Gallery, San Francisco, California
- 1980: Society for the Encouragement of Contemporary Art (SECA) Award 1980, San Francisco Museum of Modern Art, San Francisco, California

== Group exhibitions ==
- 2025: Same Blue as the Sky, et al, San Francisco, CA

- 2024: The Portland Vase: Mania and Muse, Crocker Art Museum
- 2022: Abstraction: Landscapes and Otherscapes, Ballinglen Museum of Art, Ballycastle, Ireland
- 2020: Taking Space: Contemporary Women Artists and the Politics of Scale, Pennsylvania Academy of the Fine Arts, Philadelphia, Pennsylvania
- 2019: Building a Different Model: Selections From the di Rosa Collection, di Rosa Center for Contemporary Art, Napa, California
- 2018: Rise Up! Social Justice in Art From the Collection of J. Michael Bewley, San Jose Museum of Art, San Jose, California
- 2017: Color and Pattern, Pivot Art + Culture, Seattle, Washington
- 2014: Building Forward, Looking Back, de Saisset Museum, Santa Clara University, Santa Clara, California
- 2012: The Female Gaze: Women Artists Making Their World, Pennsylvania Academy of the Fine Arts, Philadelphia, Pennsylvania
- 2011: Fifty Years of Bay Area Art – The SECA Awards, SFMOMA, San Francisco, California
- 2010: American Printmaking Now, National Art Museum of China, Beijing, China (traveling)
- 2006: The Missing Peace Project: Artists Consider the Dalai Lama, Fowler Museum, University of California Los Angeles, Los Angeles, California (traveling)
- 2001: Pay Attention…I hope you learned your lesson: Works from the Collection of Laila Twigg-Smith, The Contemporary Museum, Honolulu, Hawai'i
- 1997: The Magic of Numbers, Staatsgalerie Stuttgart, Stuttgart, Germany
- 1997: Bay Area Art from the Morgan Flagg Collection, Fine Arts Museums of San Francisco - M.H. de Young Memorial Museum, San Francisco, California
- 1995: Abstraction, The Bermuda National Gallery, Hamilton, Bermuda
- 1991: Herstory: Narrative Art by Contemporary California Artists, January 12 – March 24, the Oakland Museum of California, Oakland, California
- 1987: The Third Western States Biennial, Art Museum of South Texas, Corpus Christi, Texas (traveling)
- 1982: From the Sunny Side: Six East Bay Artists, The Oakland Museum, Oakland, California
- 1982: Emerging Northern California Artists, Orange County Center for Contemporary Art, Santa Ana, California

== Public collections ==
Carnwath's work is represented in the following public collections:

- American Academy of Arts and Letters, New York, New York
- Anderson Collection at Stanford University, Stanford, California
- Arkansas Museum of Fine Art, Little Rock, Arkansas
- Berkeley Art Museum, University of California, Berkeley, California
- Bowdoin College Art Museum, Brunswick, Maine
- Brooklyn Museum, Brooklyn, New York
- Crocker Museum of Art, Sacramento, California
- Fine Arts Museums of San Francisco, San Francisco, California
- Honolulu Museum of Art, Honolulu, Hawai'i
- List Visual Art Center, M.I.T., Boston, Massachusetts
- The Metropolitan Museum of Art, New York, New York
- Museum of Fine Arts, Boston, M
- The Shrem Museum, University of California, Davis, California
- Norton Museum of Art, West Palm Beach, Florida
- Oakland Museum of California, Oakland, California
- Palm Springs Desert Museum, Palm Springs, California
- The Rutgers University Fine Arts Collection, Brunswick, New Jersey
- San Francisco Museum of Modern Art, San Francisco, California
- San Jose Museum of Art, San Jose, California
- Yale University Art Gallery, New Haven, Connecticut

== Publications ==
In 1996, Chronicle Books published a 108-page monograph titled Squeak Carnwath: Lists, Observations & Counting with essays by Leah Levy and James and Ramsay Breslin.

In 2009, the professional association between artist Squeak Carnwath and Karen Tsujimoto, senior curator of art at the Oakland Museum of California, culminated in the exhibition Squeak Carnwath: Painting Is No Ordinary Object (April 25 through August 23, 2009). The exhibition's companion book, Painting Is No Ordinary Object, is a 160-page retrospective of Carnwath's career. It features more than 80 color reproductions and essays by Tsujimoto and art critic and poet John Yau (co-published by Pomegranate, 2009).

In 2014, Kelly's Cove Press published Horizon on Fire: Works on Paper 1979-2013. This book accompanied an exhibition of works on paper, which traveled to the College of Marin Fine Arts Gallery, Jordan Schnitzer Museum of Art, and the American University Museum.

== Other projects ==
In 2000, Carnwath partnered with husband Gary Knecht and artist Viola Frey to establish the Artists' Legacy Foundation (ALF). According to the Foundation's website, their mission is "... to support and encourage fellow artists through awards and grants, promoting and protecting the legacy of deceased "Legacy Artists," and generally supporting the visual arts, especially where the hand of the artist is a significant factor in making art."

In 2017, she launched Roll Up Project, a window display space for Bay Area artists. Located in Oakland's Jack London district, the project aims to celebrate and promote a diverse range of local artists and their work.
