= Artadia =

American arts organization

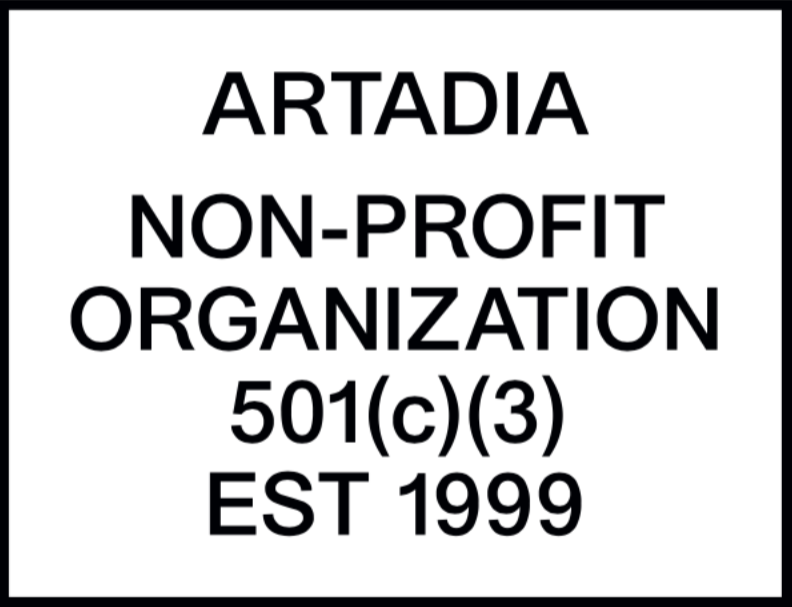
- Artadia's logo
- Formation: 1999; 27 years ago
- Founded at: San Francisco, California, USA
- Type: Nonprofit
- Tax ID no.: 91-1877238
- Headquarters: New York City, New York, USA
- Region served: Atlanta, Boston, Chicago, Houston, Los Angeles, New York City, and San Francisco
- Executive Director: Patton Hindle (2023-present)
- Website: artadia.org

Artadia is an American arts non-profit organization founded in 1999. It is headquartered in New York City, and support visual artists with unrestricted, merit-based financial awards as well as other opportunities.

== History ==
Artadia was founded in San Francisco in 1999 by businessman and art collector Christopher E. Vroom and a group of art collectors and philanthropists who sought to increase financial and professional support for artists. In 2002, Artadia relocated to New York and increased the geographical scope of its grant making to include seven cities: Atlanta, Boston, Chicago, Houston, Los Angeles, New York, and San Francisco. Patton Hindle succeeded longtime executive director Carolyn Ramo on October 23, 2023.

== Programs ==
The Artadia Award is offered through an open call application, available to artists in six cities: Atlanta, Chicago, Houston, Los Angeles, New York and San Francisco. Artist recipients are selected by a rotating team of curators who make studio visits with finalists. Artadia Award funds are unrestricted and typically $10,000.

Artadia awards two specialized grants, the Marciano Artadia Award, a $25,000 award given to a Los Angeles–based artist, in addition to two standard grantees, and the NADA Artadia Award, which is presented in partnership with the New Art Dealers Alliance at their art fairs in Miami.

Artadia presents an Art & Dialogue program series, which includes studio visits, public programs, and online media showcasing awardees, including free public talks by curators presented in collaboration with local partner organizations. Artadia oversees the Artadia Fellowship, which supports immigrant and refugee artists with connections to Artadia awardees in the Houston art community.

In 2019 the organization introduced a grant for emerging artists. During the 2020 COVID 19 pandemic, the organization announced a plan to distribute $10 million to artists impacted by the crisis by distributing $5000 grants to 100 artists per week, ultimately funding 2000 artists.

Since 1999, Artadia has given grants to over 331 artists.
