= Allan Barry Stone =

American art dealer and collector

- Born: February 6, 1932; New York City, US
- Died: December 15, 2006 (aged 74); Westchester County, New York, US
- Education: JD Degree
- Alma mater: Harvard University; Boston University
- Occupations: Art dealer; Collector
- Organization: Allan Stone Gallery
- Spouses: Marguerite Cullman; Clare Chester
- Children: 6

Allan Barry Stone (1932–2006) was an American art dealer, collector, and leading authority on Abstract Expressionism. In 1960, he founded the Allan Stone Gallery where he became renowned for his early advocacy of preeminent 20th-century artists. He championed artists such asJohn Chamberlain, Joseph Cornell, Willem de Kooning, Richard Estes, Arshile Gorky, John Graham, Eva Hesse, Franz Kline, Yasuhide Kobashi, Wayne Thiebaud, and Jack Whitten. He was also known for his zealous and eclectic approach to art collecting, amassing a collection that spanned painting, sculpture, assemblage, collage, folk art, Art Nouveau, Art Deco, furniture, mechanical parts, signs, and bugatti cars. At the time of his death, he had the largest collection of African and Oceanic art in private hands.

== Early life and education ==
Allan Stone was born in Manhattan in 1932. His father was a lawyer and his mother was the daughter of Sam Klein, the founder of New York City-based discount dress store chain S. Klein on the Square. Stone attended Phillips Academy in Andover, Massachusetts, Harvard University, and studied law at Boston University.

Stone was interested in art from an early age. American cartoonist Gus Edson was a family friend and his artistic talent fascinated Stone when he was a boy. Stone drew cartoons from an early age and painted during his time at Andover.

Following his graduation from Boston University, Stone practiced law at the U.S. Department of Justice in Washington D.C. and then on Wall Street in New York City. However, he was unable to shake his passion for art. He spent much of his working day giving legal advice to artists for free or in exchange for their work. His clientele included Robert Mallary, John Chamberlain, and Elaine de Kooning, the latter of whom was instrumental in convincing Stone to quit law and start his gallery. He had also begun collecting art in earnest. While studying at Boston University, Stone had met artist Robert S. Neuman and infatuated with Neuman's Barcelona paintings. During this time, he joined the Anonymous Art Reclamation Society which was founded by art dealer Ivan Karp.

His growing relationships with artists eventually drove him to quit law for good and open the Allan Stone Gallery. Reflecting on the decision, Stone remarked: "I couldn't say that I intellectually decided to go into it. I sort of got sucked into it, sort of the way a junkie gets sucked into a heroin parlor."

== Allan Stone Gallery ==
In 1960, Stone founded the Allan Stone Gallery with his first wife Marguerite Cullman on 18 East 82nd Street in New York City. Stone's inaugural exhibition debuted César's first show in the United States. The gallery later relocated to 86th and Madison in 1962. Despite initial hardships, the gallery quickly became famous for showcasing artists that other galleries turned away, including Wayne Thiebaud and Richard Estes. Stone met the latter at a party that Estes was bartending, going out of his way to introduce himself to the young artist when he was told Estes was too nervous to approach him.

During the gallery's first decade Stone showed established luminaries such as Willem de Kooning, César, Franz Kline, John Chamberlain, Barnett Newman, and Alfred Leslie. Stone's success exhibiting these sought-after artists allowed him to be a consistent proponent of new talent, with the gallery exhibiting some one-hundred and fifty emerging artists over the decades. He gave first or early shows to Arman, Robert Arneson, Richard Estes, Dorothy Grebenak, Eva Hesse, Robert Ryman, Wayne Thiebaud, and Jack Whitten.

In 1961, the gallery hosted a solo show for British artist Harold Cohen, whose innovative work in the 1970s would pioneer the field of computer-generated drawing and painting, marking a significant evolution in his artistic trajectory.

His unflagging enthusiasm for new, unknown artists would define his career. When discussing his philosophy as a dealer, he remarked: "I'm not interested in brokering paintings. That's like being in the stock business. The exciting part of this business is finding people and watching them develop." The Allan Stone Gallery was one of the few that would see artists and their work without an appointment—a vital lifeline for the inexperienced and unconnected. It was also unconventional in its frequent showings of unknown woman artists and artists of color, such as Eva Hesse, Gerald Jackson, Jack Whitten, Elizabeth King, Sue Miller, Sylvia Lark, Kazuko Inoue, Diana Moore, Oliver Lee Jackson, Mary Lovelace O'Neal and Lorraine Shemesh. Other young artists that Stone championed include Mundy Hepburn, Richard Hickham, James Havard, David Beck, James Grashow, Dennis Clive, and Robert Baribeau.

This eclectic mix of talent is exemplified by the roster of contemporary American artists the gallery exhibited in the 1962 Contemporary American Art show at the New York Coliseum. Works by the foremost figures in American art, including Willem de Kooning, Arshile Gorky, Robert Mallary, and Andy Warhol, hung alongside works by artists that were relatively unknown at the time such as George Deem, Thomas Downing, Stephen Durkee, Charles Ginnever, Hans Haake, John Kacere, Bernard Langlais, Robert S. Neuman, and Wayne Thiebaud.

Stone's strategy of featuring lesser-known artists alongside more established ones helped launch the careers of several artists. His exhibition of a then-relatively unknown Joseph Cornell alongside de Kooning resulted in a surge of interest for Cornell. He was also known for juxtaposing Western artists with the African tribal art he passionately collected. He exhibited Arshile Gorky and John D. Graham alongside power figures from the Congolese Songye and nail fetishes. Aside from rare instances such as these, his vast African and Oceanic art collection existed largely for his personal enjoyment and resided in his home.

The Allan Stone Gallery was Allan Stone's vision. Three of Stone's six daughters worked at the gallery during various decades. All of them inherited his passion for art and collecting. Jeremy Stone followed in her father's footsteps and opened up a gallery in San Francisco in 1982. In reflection of this shared enthusiasm, both father and daughter have showcased Mary Lovelace O'Neal. Stone was introduced to Lovelace O’Neal's work at his daughter's San Francisco Gallery in June 1984, later showing her at his gallery in New York. Records from the Allan Stone Gallery reside in the Archives of American Art.

== Legacy and impact ==
Stone influenced 20th-century art through his work with young artists. He worked with artists and shared information with them. His work with unconventional talent resulted in a following of collectors, and he curated private art collections.

The art dealer Allan Stone purchased De Kooning's Two Women in May 1983 for a record-breaking $1.2 million at Christie's auction house, significantly exceeding its auction house estimate. The sale made headlines as the highest price ever paid for a work by a living artist. Stone later resold the painting at auction for an impressive $1.98 million the following year.

Despite living in New York City, he was an enthusiastic proponent of California's Bay Area art scene. He admired the "spirit of independence" exhibited by California artists like Wayne Thiebaud and Robert Arneson.

Stone was also a leading authority on Abstract Expressionism, particularly de Kooning, Kline, Barnett Newman, Jackson Pollock, and Arshile Gorky. Stone was interviewed regarding his expertise on Pollock for the 2006 film, Who the #$&% is Jackson Pollock.

=== Relationship with Wayne Thiebaud ===
Stone's most significant partnership with an artist was with Wayne Thiebaud, who he represented for over four decades. Their relationship is renowned as "one of the most influential partnerships in American postwar art, and [has] left a legacy that many of today's artists and dealers struggle to emulate."

Stone and Thiebaud met in 1962 when the struggling Thiebaud was convinced he was "only good at being bad." The artist had spent a disheartening day showing his artworks to uninterested galleries on Madison Avenue. The Allan Stone Gallery, at the northernmost end of the street was his last stop. He was instantly captivated by the artist's lush modern still-lives of pies and gumballs machines and became Thiebaud's most enthusiastic advocate. He even ignored Barnett Newman's advice "to get rid of the pie guy—Thiebaud."

He gave Thiebaud his first solo show later that year, spurning Andy Warhol, Jasper Johns and Chuck Close in the process by offering them a group show to make space in his schedule to showcase Thiebaud. The exhibition resulted in a very favorable review in the New York Times and a significant number of sales, including a private purchase by a curator from the Metropolitan Museum of Art. The exposure Thiebaud received at the gallery launched his career and contributed to the gallery's growing reputation as one of the most respected in New York.

One memorable exhibition was Wayne Thiebaud's solo show, which featured his iconic paintings of cafeteria counter pies and cakes. This 1960s exhibition was not only a visual feast but became a noteworthy event when Elaine de Kooning attended its crowded opening. Discovering that ARTnews had sent a young reviewer who disliked the show, she immediately called Thomas Hess to urge him to visit the gallery, recognizing the significance of Thiebaud's work.

After Stone died in 2006, Thiebaud would remark, "He was the only dealer I ever had over a 45-year period. We were more than friends. We were practically family."

=== Relationship with Robert S Neuman ===
Another of Stone's earliest artist friends was Robert S Neuman. The two met in 1958 at the ICA Boston while the artist was showing and teaching in Boston. In 1959, Neuman's work was featured in major exhibitions at Washington D.C.'s Gres Gallery, Felix Landau Gallery in LA, Swertzoff Gallery in Boston, and a private showing in Harrison, New York, the latter sponsored by Stone. Stone featured his work in the May 1962 Coliseum show 'Contemporary American Art,' and a 1963 solo show at the Allan Stone Gallery, 'Pedazos del Mundo.' Throughout the rest of his career, Neuman continued to feature his work with Stone. In 1966, Neuman and Stone entered into an arrangement wherein Neuman exchanged several of his paintings for a residence in Northeast Harbor, Maine, owned by Stone.

== Personal life ==
Allan Stone was married twice, first to Marguerite Cullman with whom he had four daughters and later to Clare Chester with whom he had two more daughters. He died in his sleep from heart failure at his home in Westchester County, New York in 2006. In 2007, Stone's daughter, Olympia Stone made a film about her father entitled The Collector: Allan Stone's Life in Art.
