= Guy Diehl =

American painter

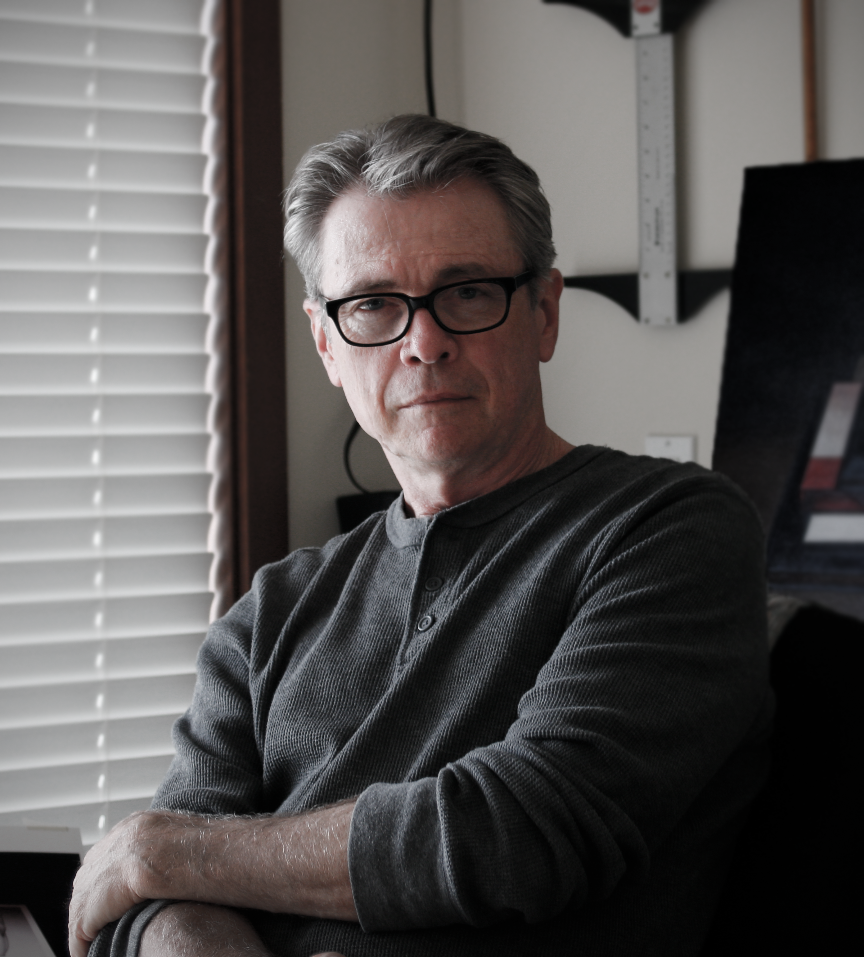
- Born: Guy Louis Diehl; 1949 (age 76–77); Pittsburgh, Pennsylvania
- Known for: Painting, Printmaking, Educator, Photography.
- Website: http://www.guydiehl.com

Guy Louis Diehl (born 1949, in Pittsburgh, Pennsylvania) is an American artist best known for still life paintings and prints, many of which incorporate direct references to historically significant artists and artworks.

== Background and education ==
At the age of eleven Diehl moved with his family from Pittsburgh to Pleasant Hill, California In 1968 he started taking courses in the art department at Diablo Valley College and then studied under Mel Ramos, one of the originators of figurative Pop Art at Cal State University, Hayward, earning a BA in 1973. Diehl says that Ramos taught him "discipline and professionalism" and, crucially, to incorporate the camera as a tool in his painting practice. Ramos also encouraged Diehl to attend San Francisco State University for graduate work.

Respected first generation photorealist painters Robert Bechtle and Richard McLean, along with photographer and painter John Gutmann, served as mentor figures for Diehl at San Francisco State as he earned a master's degree. After graduating with honors in 1976, he immediately took a position as an instructor at Diablo Valley College, teaching painting, drawing, and watercolor.

== Methods and collaborations ==
Diehl continued painting in a style heavily influenced by his photorealist mentors for several years: a 1980 review in Artweek notes a reverence for Wayne Thiebaud in both the title of Diehl's 1980 watercolor Thiebaud Towel and the execution of his acrylic painting Green Deck Chair from the same year. However, the artist's approach changed after he had a self-described "epiphany" at a 1982 show of still lifes by Gordon Cook at Charles Campbell Gallery in San Francisco. Cook's work then led Diehl toward a greater appreciation of the intimate scale of the work of Italian still life painter Giorgio Morandi. These two artists have inspired Diehl's work for more than twenty-five years; Cook and Morandi, writes Landauer, "continue to serve as Diehl's guideposts."

The subject matter of his paintings has remained largely consistent since the early 1980s: San Jose Museum of Art curator Susan Landauer wrote in 2007 that "for the past fifteen years, (Diehl's) repertoire has consisted mainly of hardcover books, typically on art or other subjects... often accompanied by some related iconic element."

Los Angeles Times art critic Leah Ollman writes that Diehl "practices painting as an act of homage," citing "visual quotes" and references to artists including Morandi, Rothko, Zurbaran, Ingres, Goya, Modigliani, Demuth and Joan Brown in a 2004 review of Diehl's paintings at Schlesinger Gallery.

Diehl's work also incorporates references to artists in other disciplines, including musicians such as Dave Brubeck, Thelonious Monk and Billie Holiday.

When painting, Diehl works almost exclusively in acrylic on canvas or watercolor on paper. His still life compositions are painted from source photographs taken by the artist in his studio. His work has generally taken a serial form, with paintings or prints issued in a series connected by some common theme, from his 1970s images of figures in swimming pools to his more recent series of book paintings. In 2012, on the occasion of the seventy-fifth anniversary of the Golden Gate Bridge, Diehl and designer Michael Rylander published GGB75, a series of photographs by Diehl of the bridge as seen from across the Bay in Tiburon, California.

Since 1988, Diehl has collaborated with Donald Farnsworth at Magnolia Editions in Oakland, California on a variety of print projects including lithographs, etchings, woodcuts, pigmented inkjet prints and mixed-media editions. Magnolia Editions has also published a series of editioned Jacquard tapestries by Diehl.

== Exhibitions, collections and public art ==
Diehl is currently represented by Dolby Chadwick Gallery in San Francisco; he was previously represented by Hackett-Freedman Gallery in San Francisco. Recent solo shows include A Dialogue with Tradition at Dolby Chadwick Gallery in 2013; Guy Diehl: Still Life Painting at Dolby Chadwick Gallery in 2011; and a 2007 exhibition at the Sonoma Valley Museum of Art in Sonoma, California.

He has also had solo exhibitions at San Francisco venues including Modernism (in 1993, 1994, and 1997); Jeremy Stone Gallery (1986, 1988, and 1990); and Hank Baum Gallery (1979, 1980, 1982, and 1984), as well as exhibiting in Stockton, Redding, Pittsburgh, and Concord, California, and at the Shepard Art Gallery in Reno, Nevada.

Diehl's work is included in numerous public collections including the Fine Art Museums of San Francisco, The Oakland Museum of California, The U.S. Department of State's Art Bank Program, Bank of America in San Francisco, the Cantor Arts Center at Stanford University, the Mansion at MGM Grand in Las Vegas, Princeton University, the Redding Museum, the Redwood City Library, the Southern California Gas Company in Los Angeles, the Ritz-Carlton in Washington, D.C., the Triton Museum of Art, and the Jane Voorhees Zimmerli Art Museum at Rutgers University.

Diehl has been commissioned to create works for the Mansion at MGM Grand; The One and Only Ocean Club, Paradise Island, Bahamas; the Peninsula Hotel in New York City; Princess Cruise Lines; Vasco Restaurant in Mill Valley, California; and Voltaire Restaurant in Dallas, Texas.

In 2013, Diehl created a nine-by-eleven-foot mural entitled Still Life with Billie Holiday, a "transmedia" work with embedded RFID tags, at 240 G Street in downtown Davis, California as part of an interactive art walk installation organized by John Natsoulas Gallery.

Work by Diehl appeared in the group exhibition Realism, Really? Today's Contemporary Realists on view August 8 through October 26, 2014 at the Sonoma Valley Museum of Art.
