= Paul Catanese =

Paul Catanese may refer to:

- Paul Catanese (artist) American hybrid media artist, author, and educator
- P. W. Catanese, pen name of Paul Catanese, American children's fiction author and advertising writer
