= Deem =

Deem is a surname. Notable people with the surname include:

- Frank Deem (1928-2018), American engineer and politician
- George Deem (1932–2008), American artist
- Helen Deem (1900–1955), New Zealand medical doctor and academic
- Michael W. Deem, American biochemist
- Paul Deem (born 1957), American cyclist
- Roger Deem (1958–2020), American wrestling photographer

== See also ==
- Deems
