= Deems =

Deems is a surname. Notable people with the surname include:

- Barrett Deems (1914–1998), American jazz drummer
- Charles Deems (1820–1893), American Christian clergyman
- James Monroe Deems (1818–1901), American composer and music educator

== See also ==
- Deem
