= Magnolia Editions =

American fine art studio and printshop

Magnolia Editions, also known as Magnolia Tapestry Project and Magnolia Press, was founded in 1981 and is a fine art studio and printshop, located in Oakland, California. Magnolia Editions publishes fine art projects, including unique and editions works on paper, artist books, and public art.

== About ==
The studio includes facilities for etching and intaglio printing as well as digital printing onto substrates (such as gessoed panel, glass, leather, plexiglass, aluminum, or raw linen). Several artists have worked at Magnolia to realize major commissions for the San Francisco International Airport and the Oakland International Airport. Other recent projects have incorporated a mix of traditional and digital techniques, such as a digital photogravure method in which a 'resist' is digitally printed on an etching plate, developed by Magnolia Editions director Donald Farnsworth, and projects which merge painting and printmaking by printing acrylic color over hand-painted, three-dimensional textures.

== History ==
Primarily operating a printmaking studio, since the 1990s Magnolia Editions has also gained a reputation for its tapestry editions. A set of proprietary color matching techniques developed by Farnsworth based on his years of printmaking experience are used to digitally direct electronic looms at a mill in Belgium, putting an industrial technology in the service of fine artists. Magnolia has published Jacquard tapestry editions by artists such as Chuck Close, Alex Katz, Masami Teraoka, Ed Moses, Leon Golub, Hung Liu, Enrique Chagoya, Bruce Conner, and Nancy Spero, among others. Each tapestry work typically contains 17,800 warp threads and 8 groups of repeating colors. Magnolia Editions tapestries have been exhibited in museums and galleries worldwide including the Whitney Museum of American Art and the White Cube Gallery in London.

Magnolia Editions has published twelve tapestry editions by Kiki Smith since the artist was invited by Donald Farnsworth in the early 2010s to try her hand at the medium. Smith notes that the tapestries provide an opportunity to work at a larger scale ("I never thought I could make a picture so big") and to work with color, which she does not frequently do otherwise.

== Fundraising ==
In August 2011, Magnolia Editions published "Sacred Pine," an open edition print sold as a fundraiser for nonprofits helping to rebuild Japan after the 2011 Tōhoku earthquake and tsunami and trying to eliminate nuclear power plants located on fault lines in California.

In September 2012 Magnolia Editions published two tapestry editions and three print editions by Chuck Close depicting President Barack Obama. The first tapestry was unveiled at the Mint Museum in North Carolina in honor of the Democratic National Convention. These tapestries and prints were sold as a fundraiser to support the Obama Victory Fund. A number of the works were signed by both Close and Obama.

== Artists ==
The following is a partial list of artists whose work has been published by Magnolia Editions:

- Faisal Abdu'Allah
- Squeak Carnwath
- Enrique Chagoya
- Chuck Close
- Bruce Conner
- Lewis deSoto
- Guy Diehl
- Andy Diaz Hope and Laurel Roth Hope
- Ralph Goings
- Leon Golub
- Gus Heinze
- Alex Katz
- Hung Liu
- Ed Moses
- Deborah Oropallo
- Mel Ramos
- Kiki Smith
- Nancy Spero
- Masami Teraoka
- Peter Voulkos
- William T. Wiley
