= Gus Heinze =

German-American painter (born 1926)

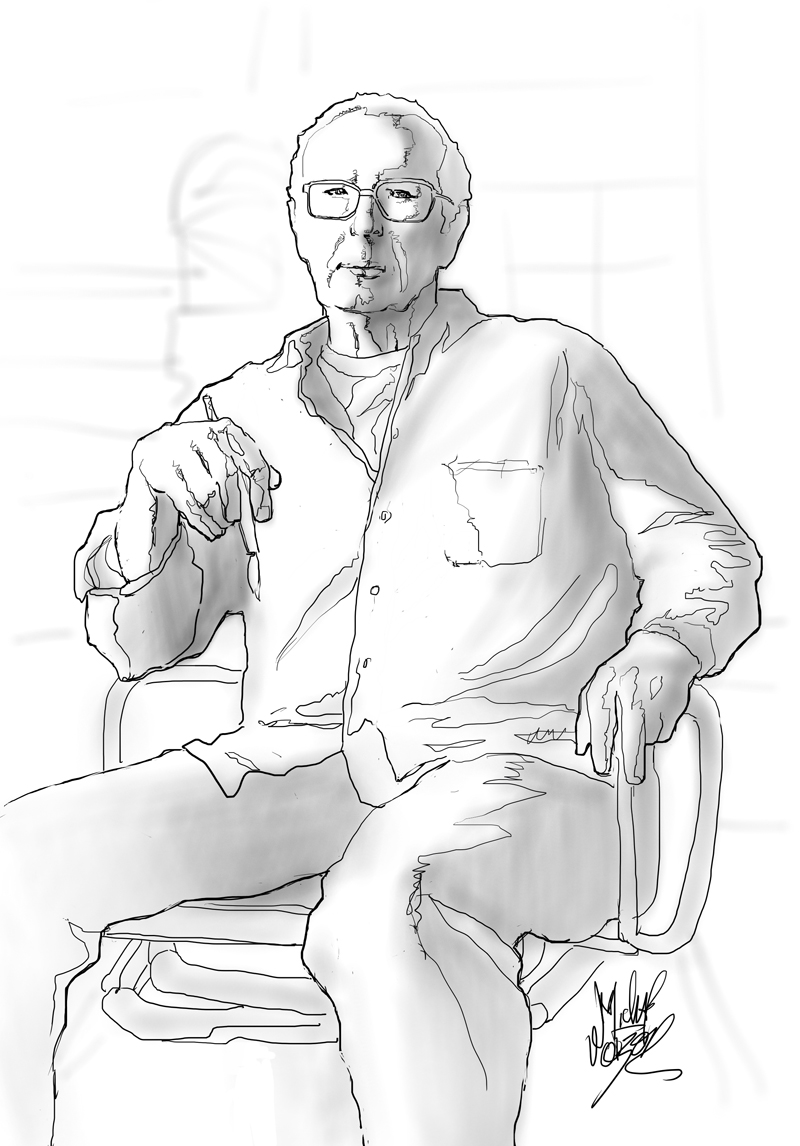
- Gus Heinze by Michael Netzer
- Born: May 1, 1926 (age 100); Bremen, Germany
- Known for: Painting
- Movement: Photorealism

Gus Heinze (born May 1, 1926) is an American photorealist painter.

== Early work ==
From 1947-1950, Heinze studied under Robert Weaver, Howard Trafton, and Robert Ward Johnson at the School of Visual Arts and the Art Students League in New York. During the 1950s and 1960s he worked as a freelance commercial artist on Madison Avenue. In 1970 he began his career as a photorealist painter in Bondville, Vermont; many of his paintings from this period depict parts of automobiles and motorcycles in close-up.

== "Abstract realism" ==
In 1978 Heinze relocated to Marin County, California, and began exploring more diverse subjects. He increasingly moved toward storefront-window and city scenes, in a style that he calls "abstract realism," where the subject is real but the point of view and composition give the painting an abstract quality — resulting in a kind of reverse trompe-l'œil. As his works can appear half-real, half-abstract, it is not surprising that the artist himself describes abstract realism as "a total oxymoron."

In addition to his urban subjects, Heinze has also painted dilapidated farm equipment such as tractors and water pumps, and old trains and locomotive engines; in Exactitude: Hyperrealist Art Today, John Russell Taylor writes that "Heinze is fascinated by decaying machinery left behind as the detritus of the Industrial Revolution. The forms are powerful, if inscrutable." He has also done series of paintings depicting rocky cliffsides, vineyard grapes, and streams; much of his subject matter is characterized by complex reflections off glass or water, intricate foliage, and deep background blacks with saturated colors in the foreground. In Photorealism at the Millennium, Louis K. Meisel writes that Heinze "has not settled into any particular subject matter or point of view. This makes his work less distinctive and recognizable than that of other photorealists, but it also provides him with an added degree of freedom."

Heinze's paintings have been featured in the books The Martini and The Cigar, both by Barnaby Conrad III. In 1999 he began collaborating with Magnolia Editions to produce lithographic reproductions.

== Solo exhibitions since 1995 ==
- 2011 — Bernarducci.Meisel.Gallery, New York
- 2009 — Bernarducci.Meisel.Gallery, New York
- 2006 — Bernarducci.Meisel.Gallery, New York
- 2004 — David Klein Gallery, Birmingham, Michigan
- 2004 — Plus One Gallery, London, UK
- 2004 — Bernarducci.Meisel.Gallery, New York
- 2003 — Modernism, San Francisco
- 2002 — Bernarducci.Meisel.Gallery, New York
- 1999 — Mendenhall Gallery, Pasadena, California
- 1998 — Modernism, San Francisco
- 1997 — Mendenhall Gallery, Pasadena, California
- 1996 — Modernism, San Francisco
- 1995 — Galerie Redman, Berlin, Germany

== Group exhibitions since 2005 ==
- 2010 — "Expansion," Bernarducci.Meisel.Gallery, New York
- 2008 — "Contemporary American Realism: 2008 Biennial," Fort Wayne Museum of Art, Fort Wayne, Indiana
- 2008 — "Unforeseen Reflections," Bernarducci.Meisel.Gallery, New York
- 2008 — "SPF 20 — Shades of Summer," Bernarducci.Meisel.Gallery, New York
- 2007 — "Culinary Arts," Bernarducci.Meisel.Gallery, New York
- 2007 — "Structure," Bernarducci.Meisel.Gallery, New York
- 2006 — "Summer Suite," Bernarducci.Meisel.Gallery, New York
- 2005-6 — "Majestic Tapestries of Magnolia Editions," Bedford Gallery, Walnut Creek, California
- 2005 — "Contemporary American Realism VIII," MA Doran Gallery, Tulsa, Oklahoma
- 2005 — "Personal Places," Bernarducci.Meisel.Gallery, New York
- 2005 — "Winter in Blue," Bernarducci.Meisel.Gallery, New York
- 2005 — "Industrial Landscapes in Contemporary Painting," Bernarducci.Meisel.Gallery, New York
- 2005 — "21st Century Realism," General Electric Company Corporate Art Program, Fairfield, Connecticut

== Selected public collections ==
- Allergan Pharmaceuticals, Los Angeles
- Bank of America World Headquarters, San Francisco
- Chase Manhattan Bank, New York
- Dreyer's Grand Ice Cream, Oakland, California
- Dean Witter Reynolds, San Francisco
- GTE Corporation, Thousand Oaks, California
- Hughes Aircraft Corporation, Los Angeles
- Kaiser Permanente, Fontana, California
- Transamerica Corporation, Los Angeles
