= Robert S. Neuman =

American painter

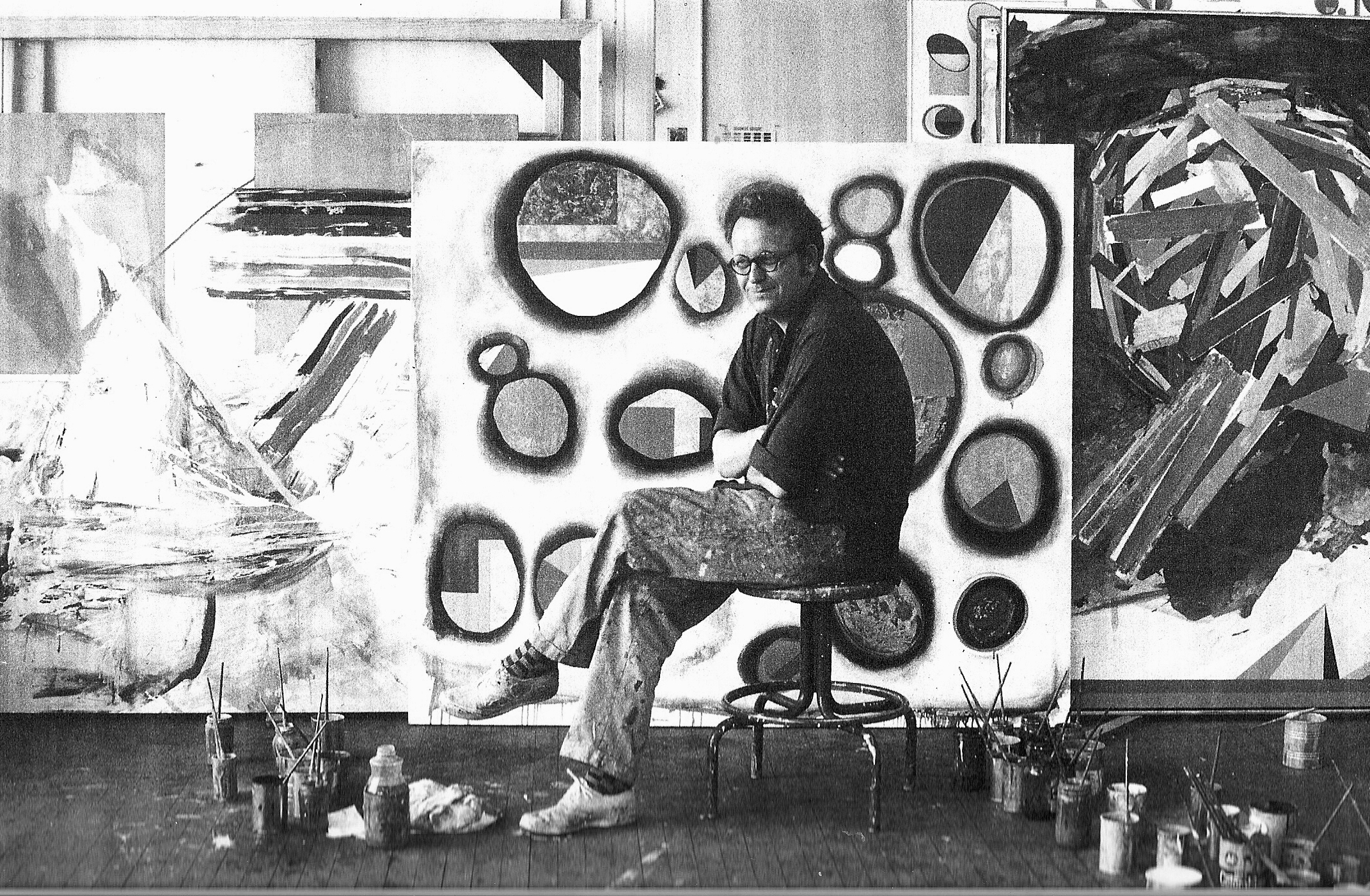
- Robert S. Neuman (1967) in 2nd studio in Central Square
- Born: September 9, 1926; Kellogg, Idaho, U.S.
- Died: June 20, 2015 (aged 88); Boston, Massachusetts, U.S.
- Education: University of Idaho, California College of the Arts, San Francisco Art Institute
- Occupations: painter, printmaker, educator
- Years active: 1946–present
- Website: www.robertsneuman.com

Robert Sterling Neuman (9 September 1926 – 20 June 2015) was an American abstract painter, printmaker, and an art teacher.

== Biography ==
=== Early life ===
Neuman was born and raised in the small mining town of Kellogg, Idaho, as the only child of Katherine Samuelson and Oscar Neuman. He is of Swedish and German-American descent. Neuman's passion for the arts blossomed early in his childhood. He would often "borrow" drafting and painting materials from his parents' small hardware store to paint the nearby scenic Western vistas. While attending the local high school, Neuman was permitted to take the school's only art course three times at the insistence of his mother.

=== Education and career ===
In 1944, Neuman graduated from high school and briefly enrolled in the University of Idaho in Moscow, Idaho, to study graphic design. In 1945, he was drafted into the army where he served in the Army Air Corps until the end of World War II.

After Neuman was honorably discharged from the army in 1946, he relocated to Oakland, California to attend the California College of Arts and Crafts under the G.I. Bill.

Neuman described his first encounters with California's art as "…coming from the state of Idaho to San Francisco and… seeing Clyfford Still for the first time [and] Diebenkorn, all hanging there, was quite a shock. Here I'd been painting views of Coeur d'Alene Lake with the mountains!".

In the early 1950s, Neuman received his Bachelor of Fine Arts in Applied Art and his Master of Fine Arts at the California College of Arts and Crafts alongside classmates Nathan Oliveira and Peter Voulkos. He also studied painting with American abstract artist James Budd Dixon at the California School of Fine Arts (CSFA, now the San Francisco Art Institute) and with German Expressionist Max Beckmann at Mills College. In 1952, Neuman was awarded the prestigious Bender Grant for his artistic contributions.

After completing his graduate studies, Neuman held faculty appointments at the California School of Fine Arts and the California College of Arts and Crafts. During this time, he exhibited in juried shows alongside fellow Abstract Expressionists Morris Graves, Robert Motherwell, Willem de Kooning and Sam Francis. In 1953, Neuman was awarded the Fulbright Fellowship and traveled with his wife to Stuttgart, Germany as one of the first artists to visit the country since the end of WWII. In Stuttgart, Neuman studied under the German Expressionist painter Willi Baumeister and began his first major series of paintings, the Black Paintings. After he returned to the United States in 1954, Neuman and his wife relocated to the East Coast of the United States where he briefly taught at the New Paltz State Teachers College (now SUNY New Paltz) with colleagues that included Jules Olitski.

In 1956, Neuman was awarded a Guggenheim Fellowship and traveled to Barcelona, Spain. When asked why he chose to travel to Barcelona he said, "In Barcelona were Miró, Picasso, Julio Gonzales, Gaudi... there must be something in Barcelona!" While in Spain, Neuman worked alongside Antoni Tàpies, Joan-Josep Tharrats and Albert Ràfols-Casamada. He reunited with Alberto Burri, whom he had met while traveling in Europe under the Fulbright Fellowship. Burri helped Neuman launch his own show at the Galleria del Cavallino in Venice. This exhibition earned praise from art collector and socialite Peggy Guggenheim. The gallery's owner later offered Neuman a contract to return to Italy, though he declined to avoid uprooting his family.

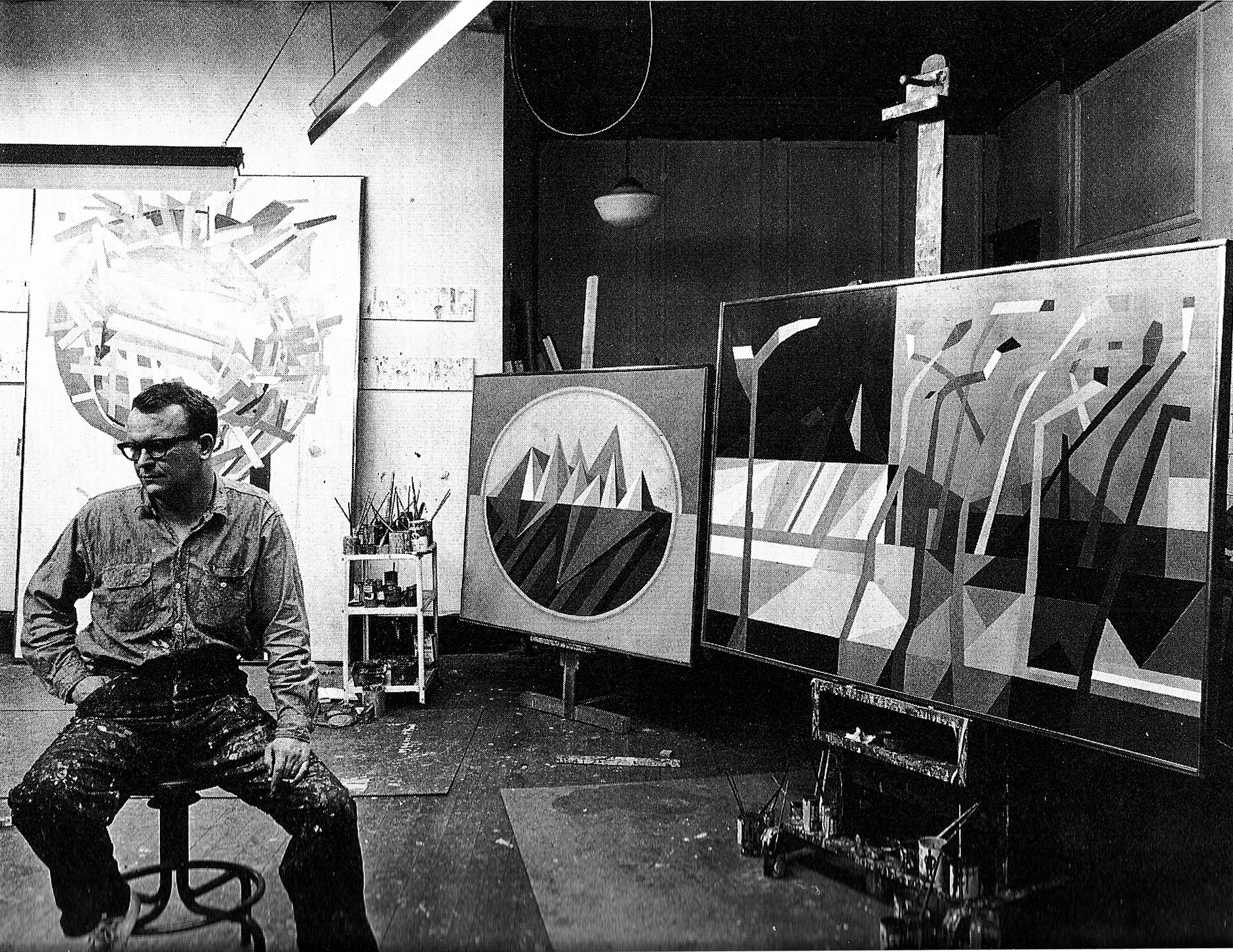
Robert Neuman (1960) in early studio at Central Square, Cambridge.

When Neuman returned to the United States he embarked upon a teaching career. He taught successively at the Massachusetts College of Art, Brown University in Providence, and for seven years at Harvard University's Carpenter Center, Neuman also chaired the art department at Keene State College in Keene, New Hampshire from 1972 until his retirement in 1990, when he was awarded professor emeritus.

During this time, Neuman became closely associated with numerous East Coast galleries. In 1959, he had major exhibitions in Washington, D.C. at the Gres Gallery and in Purchase, New York, at a private showing sponsored by Allan Stone. He was also associated with Arnold Glimcher's Pace Gallery, where his sold-out show in 1960, as well as his Grand Prize in the 1961 Boston Arts Festival, were important landmarks in his career. During the 1960s and '70s, Neuman exhibited his work at the Ward-Nasse Gallery in Boston, Massachusetts, at the DeCordova Museum and Sculpture Park in Lexington, Massachusetts, and at the Allan Stone Gallery in New York.

Throughout these years, Neuman's Brookline studio was next door to that of his friend and fellow artist Albert Alcalay, who also taught at the Carpenter Center. Beginning in the summer of 1960, Neuman and his family began to summer in Maine. In the mid-1960s, Allan Stone, friend and art dealer, traded paintings with Neuman for a home on Mount Desert Island where Neuman established himself as a central figure in the island's vibrant art scene. Over the course of the next six decades, his paintings were featured in dozens of group and solo exhibitions in nearly every major city on the East Coast, as well as numerous cities abroad. Neuman received critical notices from the likes of Dorothy Adlow, Robert Taylor, John Goodrich, Ken Johnson and Thomas Messer

=== Personal life ===
Neuman's first marriage was to Patricia Fedderson in 1947. The couple had two daughters, Elizabeth (b. 1955) and Ingrid (b. 1958), and divorced in the mid-1960s. In 1977, Neuman met gallery director, Mary Susan “Sunne” Savage, and in 1979 they married and welcomed their only child, Christina.

Neuman died on June 20, 2015, in his sleep at the age of 88. A memorial service was held on what would have been his 89th birthday on Sept 9, 2015 at the Church of the Epiphany, Winchester, MA.

== Artistic contribution ==
Neuman's career as an artist spanned over 60 years, with a body of work that was described by author Lisa Chalif as "[defying] traditional expectations of what an artist's canon should look like". As an artist, he took "a staunchly individualistic approach to his work by never giving in to fads, the demands of the commercial sector or bowing before the critics". Instead, his body of work is characterized by extended series of paintings that explore a particular motif or symbol and are heavily influenced by events in the artist's own life, in addition to global culture and history.

=== Style ===
At the beginning of his artistic career, Neuman's work followed in the vein of traditional Abstract Expressionism. Later on, although Neuman continued to use abstract forms in his work and to define himself as an Expressionist, he focused more on the use of symbols in his work. His unique approach to abstract painting prompted former Boston Globe art critic Robert Taylor, to refer to Neuman's works as "emblematic abstraction”.

Neuman's style is additionally distinguished by his bold color palette that is reminiscent of Klee, Miró, Seurat, Kandinsky and early 20th century German Expressionists. These bold washes of color are often juxtaposed with graphical, geometric forms influenced by his love of drawing. Neuman frequently incorporated pencil into his works "to define the edges of otherwise illimitable suffusions of color". Another important technique that Neuman incorporates is the inclusion of stamping and taping off areas to define planes of space. As his career progressed, such use of mixed media techniques and collage became more common.

=== Series ===
Neuman worked on 16 series of paintings, each representing a response to a different symbol, place or idea in a distinct visual language. His earliest works reflect post-war America and are filled with ominous and dark titles and color palettes. Neuman explored this theme by experimenting with different medium, such as duco paint and sand on Masonite and a new, abstracted subject matter. Neuman's first major series was The Black Paintings. This series was catalyzed by his experience studying in a still war- ravaged Germany as a Fulbright Fellow in 1953 under the tutelage of German Expressionist, Willi Baumeister. The Black Paintings’ uncharacteristically dark color palette was influenced by "the reactionary impulses to World War II that had rippled through the art world". Today, The Black Paintings serve as a glimpse into the lingering desolation of Germany in the 1950s by one of the few American artists to witness it first-hand.

After The Black Paintings, Neuman began exploring the expressive nature of color. This dramatic shift was influenced by his time studying in Barcelona as a Guggenheim Fellow. His Barcelona Series, begun in 1956, is defined by his attempts to create a universally relevant style of art, which, in this case, captured his impressions of the motion and light of the narrow streets of Old Barcelona. With the advent of the 1960s, Neuman explored the potential of abstraction more fervently than ever. During this decade, he created his Abstract Landscape, Abstract Figures and his Diamond Canvas Series before experimenting further with the use of symbols.

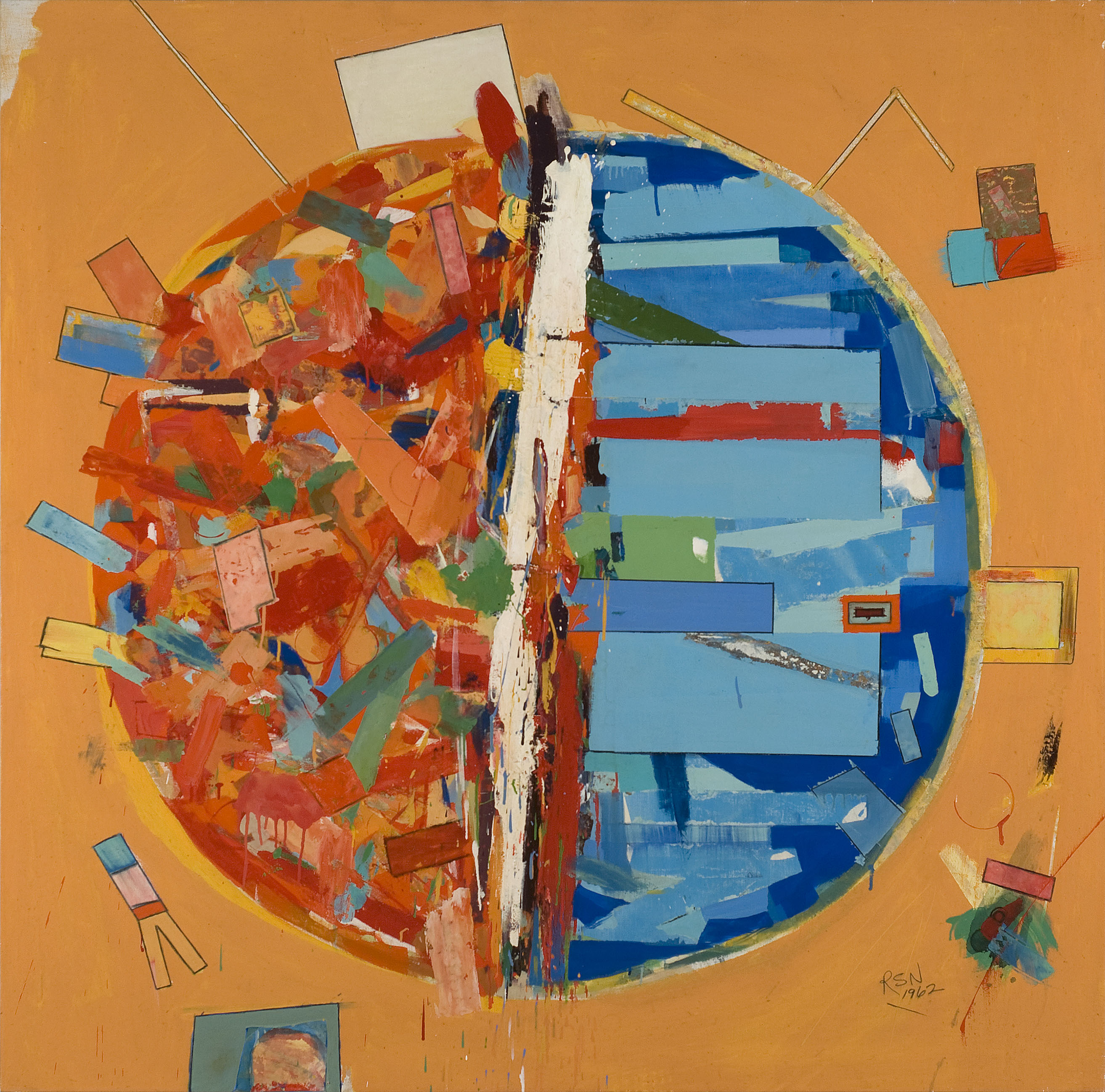
Pedazos del Mundos #6 (1961) by Robert S. Neuman

His next series, Pedazos Del Mundo, begun in 1961, is the first of Neuman's series to prominently utilize symbolism as a means of expression and has become his most celebrated body of work. When speaking of the series, Neuman has remarked, "The world is in pieces culturally: liquids, solids, gases, languages, every way you can think about it... so I painted a circle and I made it in pieces”. Pedazos exhibits "the full bloom of the graphical flair and unfailing liveliness that distinguishes Neuman’s style for the next half century". Neuman continued to use the symbol of the circle in Space Signs, begun in 1966, by using tin cans, beer bottles, lamp shades and other round objects "to stamp out resplendent orbs of color over pulsating geometric landscapes". Stacks and Piles, begun in 1975, saw Neuman's return to earth. When creating this series he was influenced by cairns, a man-made pile of stones traditionally found on hiking trails. Neuman translated the cairns into heaps of shapes, piled skyward on canvases that reached upwards of eight feet high.

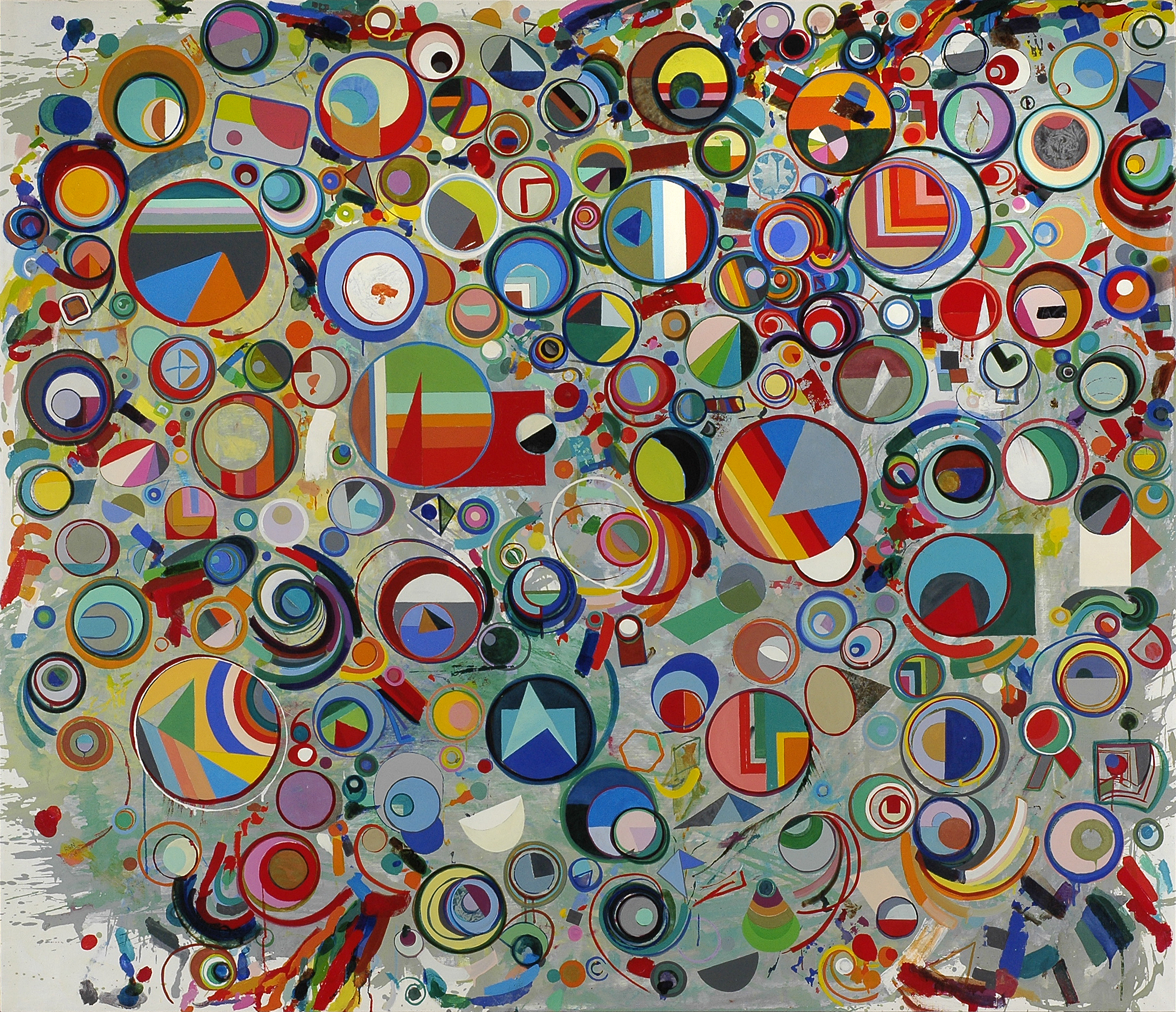
Space Signs Number 3 (1968) by Robert S. Neuman

In 1977, August Heckscher, a friend, print maker and commissioner of New York City public parks, commissioned a series of etchings from Neuman to accompany an edition of Sebastian Brandt's Shyp of Fools. The series is composed of richly evocative mixed media drawings, lithographs, etchings and printing plates that depict meticulously rendered medieval barques and their crews on ill-fated voyages to Paradise. "Each work mirrors— with irony, optimism and a touch of tongue-in-cheek humor— Brandt's own commentaries on the follies and foibles of man". In 1979, Neuman returned to Spain on a wedding trip with his wife, Sunne Savage, and visited the Alhambra palace. The Alhambra series "evokes the atmosphere of the exotic landmark and translates the ethereal rays of light that ripple through its halls into cascades of color".

In 1980, Neuman began the Lame Deer Series. Lame Deer was inspired by a visit to a Native American reservation close to the Battle of Little Big Horn in Lame Deer, Montana. Visiting the historic site spurred Neuman to visually relate the Western American landscape in a way he felt had not been done before. History is hidden in each vividly chromatic landscape where the most prominent symbol is the teepee— each has the skin stripped away, and resembles "…drawings on a cave wall, remnants of a people continually in flight.” Ultimately, the Lame Deer series was meant to bring attention to the plight of the Native Americans. As the 1980s progressed, Neuman explored new avenues of visual expression. His Rose Paintings, begun in 1982, are monochromatic, sumptuous and textural landscapes, using the applied technique of tachisme. Meanwhile, the Voyage Series, begun in 1986, saw Neuman exploring the symbolism of knots, often seen in Celtic, Viking and Moorish art, as a metaphor for travelling through life. Neuman's new works, created during the 1990s to present day, are a visual melting pot of many of his earlier series including Alhambra, Barcelona and Rose Paintings. The gestural compositions and broad flat panes of color look back to his earliest days as an Abstract Expressionist. Each work is still distinct from what has come before and begins to define what will come next.

== Collections ==
Robert Neuman's art can be found in the collections of dozens of major museums in America and in private and corporate collections in America and abroad. His work has a strong presence in the collection of Allan Stone Projects, a private gallery with an expansive and eclectic collection of Post-War American art.

== Publications ==
Neuman's work has been featured in several publications celebrating the artist's own work and achievement in American painting. Such publications include: Selection by Thomas Messer (1958), View by Thomas M. Messer (1960), Adventures in Art: Forty Years at Pace published by Pace Gallery & Mildred Glimcher (2001), Robert S. Neuman: Fifty Years by the Allan Stone Gallery (2006), Robert S. Neuman: Selected Works 1954-2007 published by Wheaton College & Sunne Savage Gallery (2007), Evolution of a Shared Vision: The David and Barbara Stahl Collection published by the Currier Museum of Art (2009), and Robert S. Neuman's Ship to Paradise, published by Bates College and the Heckscher Museum of Art (2012). To coincide with the landmark retrospective of the same name, in 2018 Keene State College published the catalogue Robert S. Neuman: Impulse and Discipline.

In 1990, Neuman was interviewed by the Smithsonian Institution to record his invaluable insights into the previous half century of American art for posterity. The interview exists as public record in the Archives of American Art at the Smithsonian Institution in Washington, DC.

== Exhibitions ==
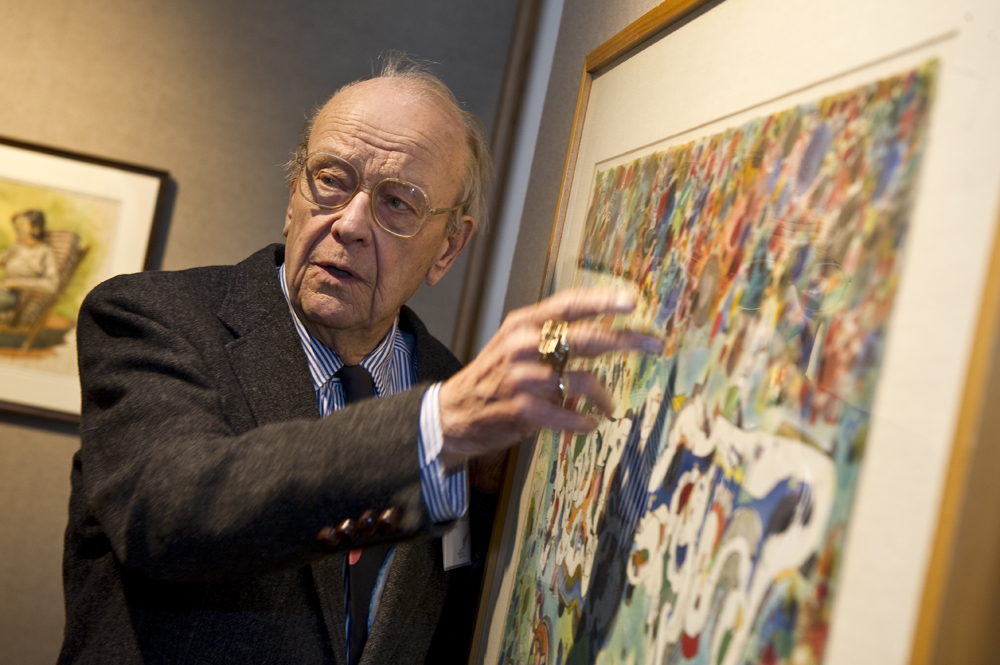
Robert S. Neuman giving a gallery talk at The Art Museum of Eastern Idaho, 2013.

Since becoming active in the San Francisco Bay Area in the 1950s, Neuman's works have been exhibited in countless major museums and galleries at home and abroad. His first group exhibitions were in 1950 and 1951 at Henry Gallery in Seattle, Washington, the San Francisco Museum of Modern Art and the Denver Art Museum. Neuman also showed at the Landau Gallery in 1953 with James Budd Dixon and Dale Joe, among others. Neuman's first solo exhibition was at the famous Gump's Gallery in San Francisco, California in 1952.

In recent years, Robert Neuman has also been the subject of many retrospective exhibitions, including those at Wheaton College (2007), Keene State College (2012 and 2017), The Art Museum of Eastern Idaho, Idaho Falls, Idaho (2013), Prichard Art Gallery, University of Idaho, Moscow, Idaho (2013) Martin-Mullen Art Gallery, SUNY Oneonta, New York (2013), Childs Gallery, Boston, Massachusetts (2014 and 2017) and Star Gallery, Northeast Harbor, Maine (2018).

Neuman is represented by Childs Gallery (Boston, Massachusetts), Elisabeth Moss Galleries (Falmouth, Maine), Lawrence Fine Art (East Hampton, New York), Star Gallery (Northeast Harbor, Maine) and Sunne Savage Gallery (Winchester, Massachusetts).
