= Donald Farnsworth =

American artist and inventor

Donald Sheridan Farnsworth
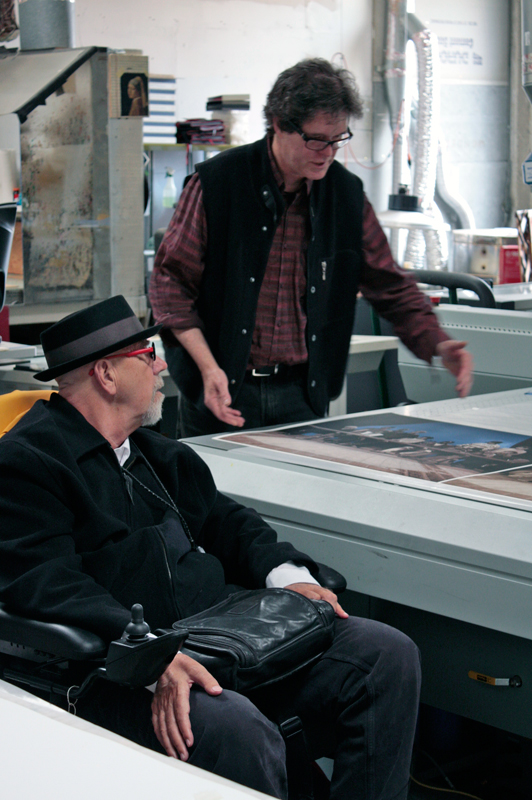
- Donald Farnsworth (standing) and Chuck Close at Magnolia Editions (2010)
- Born: June 18, 1952 (age 74); Palo Alto, California, United States
- Education: San Francisco Art Institute, University of California at Berkeley
- Known for: Printmaking, Papermaking, Tapestry, Public art
- Spouse: Era Hamaji Farnsworth
- Website: http://www.magnoliaeditions.com

Donald Sheridan Farnsworth (born July 18, 1952, in Palo Alto, California) is an American artist and inventor. He is the director of Magnolia Editions, a fine art studio and printshop in Oakland, California.

== Artworks and collaborations at Magnolia Editions ==
In 1981, Farnsworth founded fine art press and publisher Magnolia Editions in the San Francisco Bay Area with co-founders David Kimball and Arne Hiersoux. Farnsworth now publishes artworks at Magnolia's 8,000-square-foot Oakland, California warehouse location, both under his own name and in collaboration with his wife, artist Era Hamaji Farnsworth.

Farnsworth's own work often draws from his interest in the intersection of art and science. Early works on paper combined precise architectural renderings of classical Greek and Roman columns and archways with "the addition of unusual textures and designs" such as abstract patterns or fragments of antique Japanese script. His Origin: Specimens, a suite of prints depicting hyper-realistic, digitally captured images of insect and bird specimens from the California Academy of Sciences in San Francisco overlaid onto the complete text of individual chapters from Charles Darwin's On the Origin of Species, was exhibited at the Fresno Art Museum in 2007 and at the Nevada Museum of Art in 2011. The Nevada Museum curator writes: "..[T]he raw data of Darwin's text reveals Farnsworth's admiration for the epistemology of science. By subtly locating the specimens within a scientific context, Farnsworth reminds viewers that a considerable wealth of observation-based research informs the development of scientific theories like evolution." In the catalogue for the Origin: Specimens exhibition, Farnsworth writes: "Regardless of our religious beliefs, we all inhabit a work where most of the images we encounter on a daily basis are designed by corporations to sell us something. The art world is not immune to the rise of the corporate state [...] Ultimately, my goal with this series is to create images divorced from this commercial context, which instead emphasize observation, literacy, and aesthetics."

In his capacity as director of Magnolia Editions, Farnsworth also works with a wide variety of contemporary artists to produce works on paper, multiples including Jacquard tapestries, public art commissions, and other fine art projects. Describing her experience creating an edition at Magnolia, painter Inez Storer writes: "The collaborative process at Magnolia involved working directly with Farnsworth who is himself an artist and therefore understands the artist mentality."

Some of the artists who have worked with Farnsworth since Magnolia's inception include William Wiley, Squeak Carnwath, and Rupert Garcia. The latter's work at Magnolia has taken a variety of experimental forms, indicating the unorthodox nature of the studio's projects: for example, Garcia's earliest collaborations with Farnsworth were a series of automated CAD pencil drawings which allowed the artist to create a series of editioned multiples of a hand-drawn graphite portrait of Robert Motherwell; later publications with Garcia have included collography, woodcut, Jacquard tapestries, and digital inkjet prints on paper, panel, and fabric.

In the foreword to the catalogue for Rupert Garcia: The Magnolia Editions Projects 1991–2011, Achenbach Foundation for Graphic Arts curator Karin Breuer compares Farnsworth and Garcia's drive to find new means of expression, writing: "For Farnsworth it is a search for new ways for artists to make art through the creative utilization of digital tools that he has adapted to media including printmaking and tapestry weaving." In his introduction to the catalogue, Farnsworth writes: "Our place at the crossroads of analog and digital demands that we consider both the artist's hand and the mark of the media. Every media has its own mark: as media grows more complex, increased care must be taken not to let the heavy hand of technology dominate the hand of the artist."

Between 2002 and 2006, Magnolia Editions published numerous print and tapestry editions by Bruce Conner under his own name and various pseudonyms. During this period Farnsworth introduced Conner to the possibilities of digital media. In a 2008 interview, Farnsworth recalls: "For the first year, he warmed up to the computer by watching me; then I helped him pick out a computer, which he left [at Magnolia Editions] for six months, using it only when he came to the studio. Finally he took it home. Once he became familiar with Photoshop, he could easily spend 50 hours editing a single piece." Conner used the digital techniques Farnsworth showed him to meticulously re-edit a series of collages which were then translated into Jacquard tapestries, and he soon warmed to the creative potential of editing software and inkjet printing. When asked by a camera crew at Magnolia Editions what the difference was between his previous methods of working and these newer digital methods, Conner replied, "I hadn't noticed a difference."

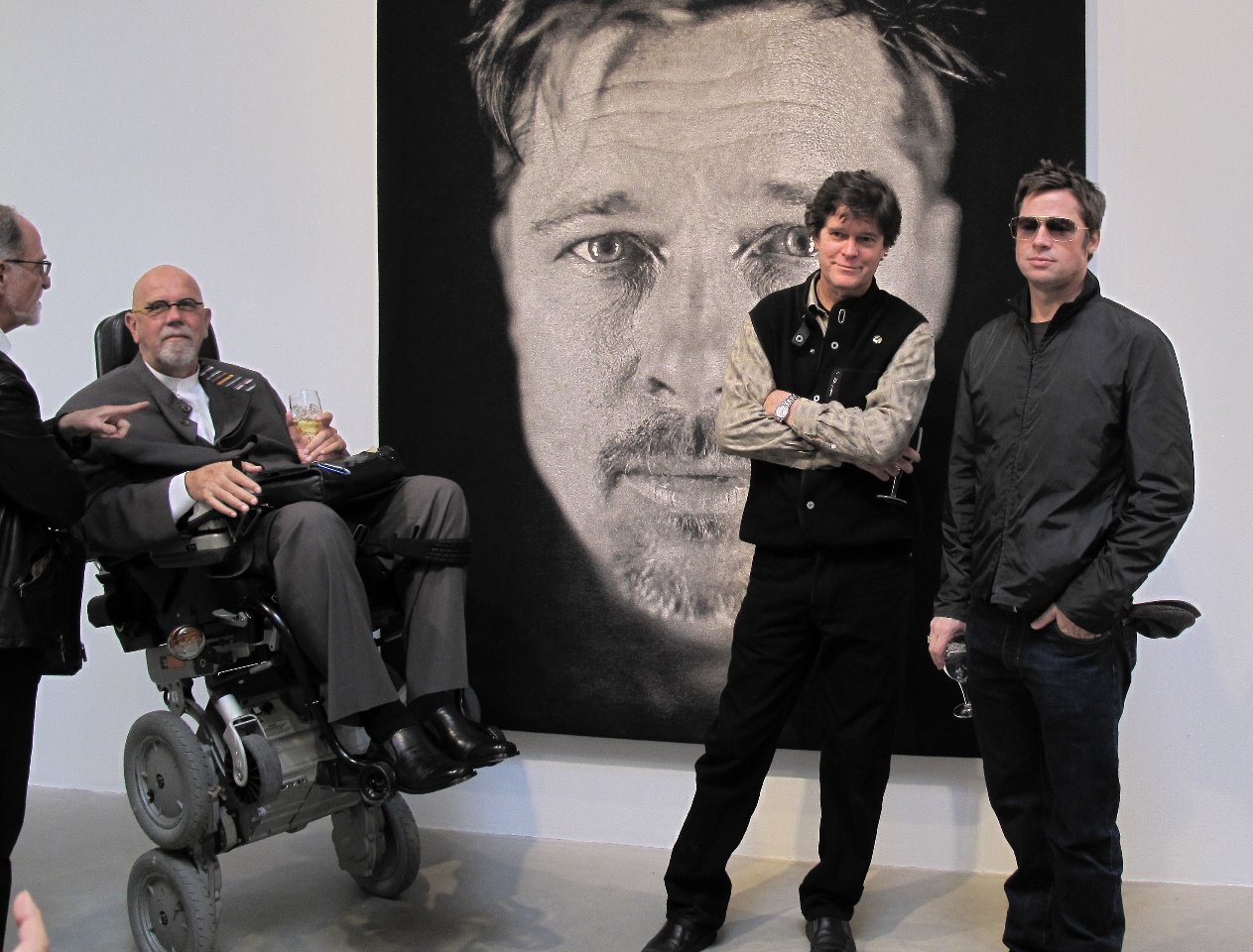
Michael Danoff, Chuck Close, Donald Farnsworth, and Brad Pitt in front of Close's 2009 tapestry portrait Brad at PaceWildenstein, New York on May 1, 2009.

Since 2006, Farnsworth has been artist Chuck Close's main collaborator on an ongoing series of editioned tapestries and prints. Farnsworth and Magnolia have been instrumental in developing the technique behind Close's series of watercolor prints, which have been called "the artist's first in-depth experimentation with the possibilities of digital technology."

In a 2014 interview with Terrie Sultan, Close named his "two great collaborators" as the late Joe Wilfer and Farnsworth, saying: "now I'm working with Don Farnsworth in Oakland at…Magnolia Editions: I do the watercolor prints with him, I do the tapestries with him. These are the most important collaborations of my life as an artist."

== Inventions and innovations ==
In addition to various commercial patents (e.g. Patent nos. 20080110071, 5089806, and 20100005692), Farnsworth's inventions include a technique that hybridizes digital printing and the traditional photogravure process. Magnolia's digital printer is employed to create an intermediary resist during the process of etching the plate, as described in Paul Catanese and Angela Geary's book Post-Digital Printmaking: CNC, Traditional and Hybrid Techniques:

"A specific example [...] can be seen in the exceptional digital direct-to-plate photogravure techniques innovated by Donald Farnsworth at Magnolia Editions, which utilizes a flatbed inkjet printer that cures inks with UV light directly on a wide range of materials, including copper plates. The UV-cured inks function as an acid-resist, and have allowed Farnsworth to establish a contemporary approach towards photogravure."

Farnsworth is credited as one of the first artists to seriously explore digital printmaking. In a 2005 article on digital media in Rangefinder Magazine, Farnsworth is quoted as saying: "Every tool has been new technology at some time; from the invention of handmade paper 2000 years ago to the invention of acrylic paint in the 1960s, there has always been new technology."

Magnolia Editions has published a number of editioned Jacquard tapestries by artists including Close, Bruce Conner, Masami Teraoka, Hung Liu, Kiki Smith, and various others. These publications rely upon a proprietary color matching process developed by Farnsworth. While working on a 1999 commission for artist John Nava to decorate the interior of the Cathedral of Our Lady of the Angels in Los Angeles, Farnsworth put his "advanced knowledge of color theory and practice" and his "innate [understanding] that combinations of different colors could be read by the human eye as a single hue" in the service of developing digital weave files that maximized both the available color gamut and the fidelity of colors to the artist's vision.

== Education, handmade paper background, and teaching ==
Farnsworth received a BFA in 1974 from the San Francisco Art Institute and an MA in printmaking in 1977 from the University of California at Berkeley.

In the early 1970s, Farnsworth began making paper on his own after purchasing a used laboratory Hollander beater. He became interested in making paper while working at Daedalus Restoration restoring works of art on paper: "I was terribly interested by what paper was all about [...] Rag paper, as opposed to wood pulp paper, archival matting and framing... I started out cutting archival mats and pretty soon I was helping out in the bleaching and de-acidification, and before I knew it I was a partner there."

Farnsworth studied printmaking at the San Francisco Art Institute with Richard Graf, Kathan Brown, Gerald Gooch, Bob Fried, and Gordon Kluge, supplementing his courses by concurrently studying chemistry and printmaking at Laney College in Oakland and lithography at the Art Institute of Chicago.

After graduating from the San Francisco Art Institute, Farnsworth worked as a printer for Walter Maibaum at Editions Press in San Francisco in the mid to late 1970s. He soon found that there was a growing demand for handmade paper from artists: in the late 1970s, he created paper for editions including several by John Cage at Crown Point Press. Some of these prints, as well as work by Farnsworth himself, are included in the collection of the Smithsonian American Art Museum. During this period Farnsworth also made handmade paper for artists including Claes Oldenberg, Nathan Oliveira, and Brice Marden; made paper pulp for sculptural casting by Manuel Neri and Bella Feldman; and worked on art production with Harold Paris and Karel Appel. Farnsworth and colleague Bob Serpa also taught inexpensive classes in forming and couching handmade paper at their Oakland, California studio.

Farnsworth has published several articles on traditional papermaking methods and papermaking as a means of conservation. In a 1976 issue of Visual Dialog he was named as one of only "four high quality professional handmade paper makers in the United States today," along with Joe Wilfer, John Koller, and Kathryn and Howard Clark of Twin Rocker.

In 1978, after marrying Era Hamaji, the couple immediately set off for Dar es Salaam in Tanzania, where Donald designed and helped build a handmade paper mill while Era worked with artisans, teaching and developing new craft products lines.

In 1997, Magnolia Editions published Farnsworth's A Guide to Japanese Papermaking: Making Japanese Paper in the Western World, a 62-page illustrated manual describing procedures for creating handmade Japanese washi paper.

From 1975 to 1986 Farnsworth was an associate professor at the California College of Arts and Crafts; in 1987 he was a guest associate professor at the University of California at Davis while serving as president of the board of directors of the World Print Council. From 1988 to 1992 he served as a Guest Associate Professor at UC Berkeley, after which he taught at the University of Hawaii in 1992 and served as Guest Artist/Instructor at Creative Growth in Oakland in 2003. He served as a Guest Lecturer at San Francisco State University in 2003–2004 and at the San Francisco Art Institute in 2011.

== Collections, grants, and awards ==
Farnsworth's artwork is represented in collections including: The Brooklyn Museum, Brooklyn, NY; The Loyola University Museum of Art, Chicago, IL; The National Museum of American Art, the Smithsonian American Art Museum, and the Zimmerli Art Museum, Rutgers University, New Brunswick, N.J. His work has been exhibited at the Museum of Modern Art, the Brooklyn Museum of Art, the San Francisco Museum of Modern Art, and the American Craft Museum.

His collaborative artwork with Era Hamaji Farnsworth is included in collections in Australia, Japan, Belgium, Madrid, and London; their collaborative tapestry Dharmakaya (2004) is included in the "Missing Peace: Artists Consider the Dalai Lama," an exhibition of works "inspired by the life and message of the Dalai Lama" that has traveled since 2006 to major venues worldwide including UCLA's Fowler Museum, the Rubin Museum of Art in New York, the Nobel Museum in Stockholm, Fundacion Canal in Madrid, the Frost Art Museum in Miami, and many more.

In 1979, Farnsworth received a Contributions to the Field Grant from the National Endowment for the Arts. In 1982 and 1988 he received purchase awards and commissions from the World Print Council and the San Francisco Graphics Arts Council. In 2003, he appeared in BOMB Magazine as Bruce Conner's "Artist's Choice." On October 20, 2013, Donald and Era Farnsworth were honored by the board of directors at Oakland Art Murmur who presented them with the Flourish Oakland Community Award, "in recognition of their steadfast support of creative enterprise and their altruistic fostering of the fine arts and artists in Oakland."
