= Jeremy Patricia Stone =

Art Appraiser, Gallerist

- Education: University of San Francisco; The Cooper Union
- Occupations: Art Advisor, Accredited Senior Appraiser, Gallerist, Writer
- Years active: 1979 – present
- Employer(s): Business Matters in the Visual Arts LLC, San Francisco Art Institute
- Notable work: Art education, Art advisory and appraisal, art exhibition curating
- Awards: ArtTable, Inc. Award for Service in the Visual Arts (2008)

Jeremy Patricia Stone is an American art appraiser and gallerist.

== Early life and education ==
Jeremy Patricia Stone is the daughter of Allan Barry Stone. She attended The Cooper Union for the Advancement of Science & Art in New York, NY, where she studied Art History & Studio from 1974 to 1976. She later earned a B.S. in Organizational Behavior, summa cum laude, from The University of San Francisco in 1995, followed by an Executive Certificate in Nonprofit Management from the same university in 1993. In 2005, Stone completed a Certificate Program in Appraisal Studies in Fine & Decorative Arts at The University of California, Irvine, in association with the American Society of Appraisers and became an accredited Senior Appraiser specializing in Fine Art.

== Jeremy Stone Gallery ==
In 1980, Jeremy Stone moved to San Francisco and within two years, she established her own gallery. The Jeremy Stone Gallery was a seminal presence in the San Francisco art scene from its founding 1982 until its closure in 1991. Located in the vibrant heart of California's cultural landscape, the gallery was the brainchild of Jeremy Stone, daughter of renowned New York art dealer, gallerist, and collector, Allan Barry Stone. Her early exposure to the art world, through part-time work at her father's gallery during her high school and college years, and her subsequent academic and professional engagements, laid the groundwork for her own venture into the art business.

The Jeremy Stone Gallery. The gallery focused on modern and contemporary art, providing a platform primarily for emerging and mid-career American artists. Among those were notable figures such as Sylvia Lark, Marshall Crossman, Mary Lovelace O'Neal, Carlos Almaraz, Arshile Gorky, James Havard, Richard Hickam, Franz Kline, Joanne Leonard, Sue Miller, Richard Sheehan, Wayne Thiebaud, Susan Hauptman, Inez Storer, Guy Diehl, and Stanley Goldstein. Over its nearly decade-long operation, the gallery curated and mounted over 80 exhibitions, significantly influencing local and national art narratives.

The gallery's records, preserved at the Archives of American Art, Smithsonian Institution, provide a detailed view of its operations and contributions.

== Art advisory and appraisal ==
Since 1998, Stone has been the owner of Business Matters in the Visual Arts LLC in San Francisco, where she serves as an Art Advisor and Accredited Senior Appraiser with the American Society of Appraisers (ASA). Her firm provides comprehensive services including advisory, appraisal, strategic planning, and organizational expertise to a wide range of clients such as artists, attorneys, collectors, estates, galleries, organizations, and corporations. Stone has also provided litigation support in cases involving artworks and artists.

== Expert Witness ==
In 1996, after being frequently called upon to testify as an expert witness in legal cases involving artists and their work, Stone began the process of becoming an accredited fine art appraiser with the American Society of Appraisers. She has collaborated with attorneys on art-related cases in Connecticut, Massachusetts, Florida, New York, Washington, California, and for the government of Canada.

== Academic and institutional roles ==
Stone has also held various academic positions, such as Visiting Faculty at the San Francisco Art Institute from 1996 to 2000 and Director of Career Services at the same institution from 1994 to 1997.

== Professional affiliations and memberships ==
Stone has been a significant figure in various art organizations, including the American Society of Appraisers and ArtTable, Inc. She has served on numerous boards, such as the San Francisco Art Institute's Board of Trustees and The Oxbow School's Board of Trustees.

== Selected lectures and panels ==
Stone has moderated and participated in numerous panels and lectures, engaging topics ranging from art valuation to the dynamics of the art market. Notable appearances include moderating the panel "An Improbable Odyssey: The Life and Times of Brian Wall" at the Palm Springs Architecture Design Film Festival in 2023.
