= Susan Hauptman =

American artist (1947–2015)

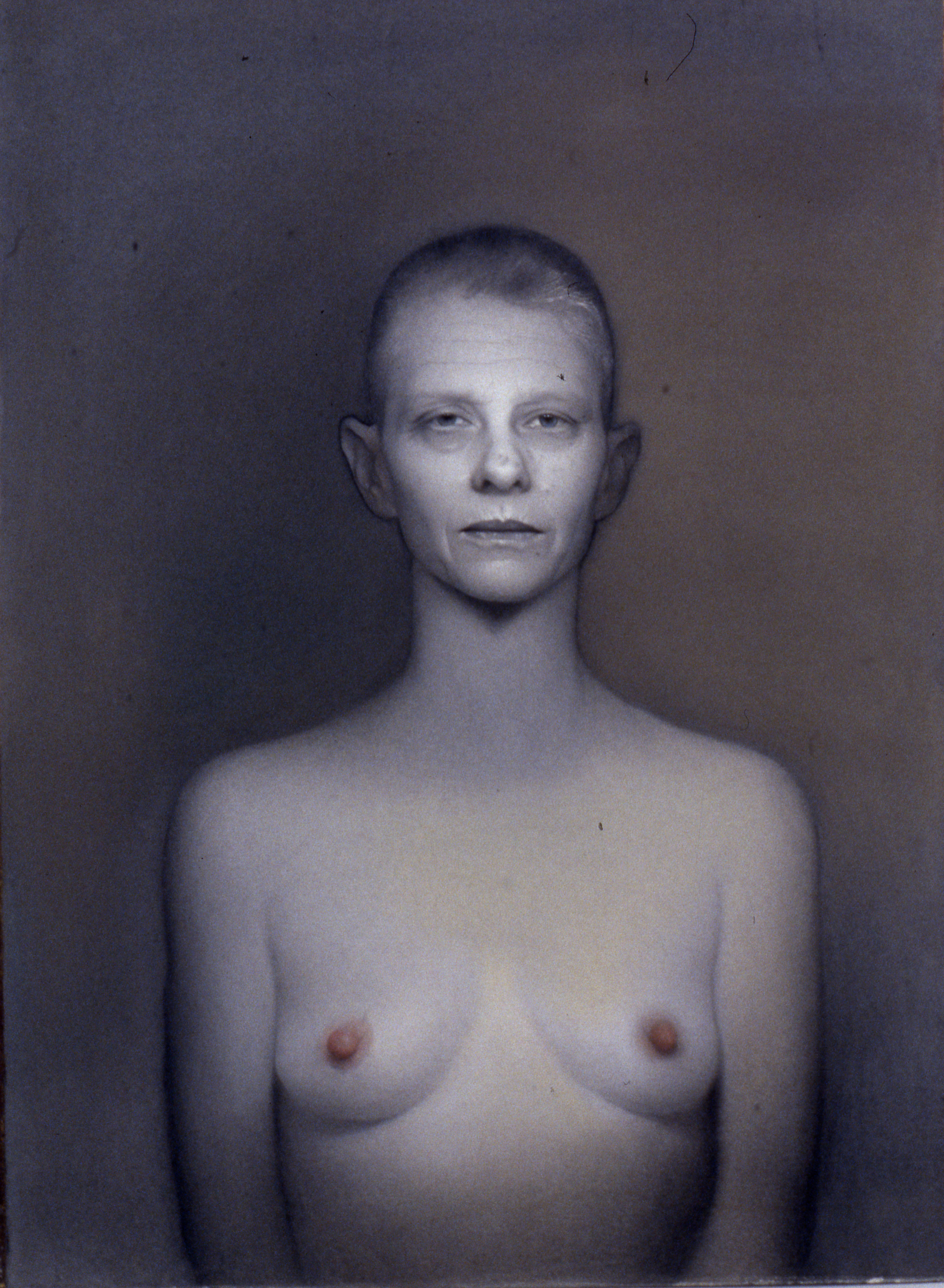
- Self-portrait, 2002
- Born: December 8, 1947; Michigan
- Died: July 18, 2015 (aged 67)
- Education: Wayne State University; University of Michigan, BFA
- Known for: Charcoal on paper
- Awards: National Endowment for the Arts Fellowship; 1985; 1991
- Website: http://www.susanhauptman.com

Susan Hauptman (1947–2015) was an American artist who worked exclusively on paper with charcoal, pastel, and later, other elements such as gold leaf, wire mesh, and thread. She is best known for her stark, enigmatic, often expressionless self-portraits in which she depicted herself with precise and candid detail. Critics described her works as strikingly androgynous and confrontational toward cultural notions of beauty, reality, femininity, and masculinity. Hauptman's exhibitions were held at several esteemed institutions, including the Norton Gallery of Art, West Palm Beach, FL; the Oakland Museum, Oakland, CA; the Corcoran Gallery of Art, Washington, D.C.; and the Jeremy Stone Gallery. Her works at the Jeremy Stone Gallery further cemented her reputation for challenging traditional gender representations through art.

Her later still lifes were of porcelain figures and fruit-box-type labels, fanciful and often romantic. They are thought to be narrative.

Susan Hauptman's self is drawn both life-scale and larger-than-life. She draws close to a traditional definition of drawing, where the drawing fundamentals of value, tone, shading, composition and, to a lesser extent, line, are formal elements within each work, modulations of elemental light and shadow. These fundamentals are transformed by her— the artist as alchemist. Her work transcends its materiality in and as drawing, offering us both the noun and verb of drawing, until we are presented with seemingly autonomous, illusionistic imaginative drawings, moments in an overarching narrative.

Hauptman's self-portraits offer complex folds, twists and turns in thinking through the inside out of representation, because it is difficult not to be seduced by the astonishing surfaces of the works into believing the illusion of likeness…, or taking for granted the mimetic imaging of the artist beyond the frame… the image and imagined. Her subjective elements, her selves perform endlessly, they constitute the limits of sexual difference…objecthood as a paradox… real against seeming real.

— Marsha Meskimmon and Phil Sawdon, Drawing Difference: Connections Between Gender and Drawing, 2016

Her work is in the collections of numerous of major galleries and museums, including the Metropolitan Museum of Art in New York City, the Smithsonian American Art Museum, Washington, DC, the Smithsonian National Portrait Gallery, Washington D.C., Crystal Bridges Museum of American Art, Bentonville, AR, the Norton Museum of Art, West Palm Beach, Fl., Arkansas Art Center, Little Rock, AR, Achenbach Foundation for Graphic Arts, San Francisco, CA, California Palace of the Legion of Honor, San Francisco, CA; Oakland Museum, Oakland, CA, and the Yale University Art Gallery, Richard Brown Baker Collection, New Haven, CT.

She held numerous teaching positions, including the Lamar Dodd Professorial Chair at the University of Georgia from 1997 to 2000.

She was married to Leonard Post, whom she often drew.

== Gallery ==
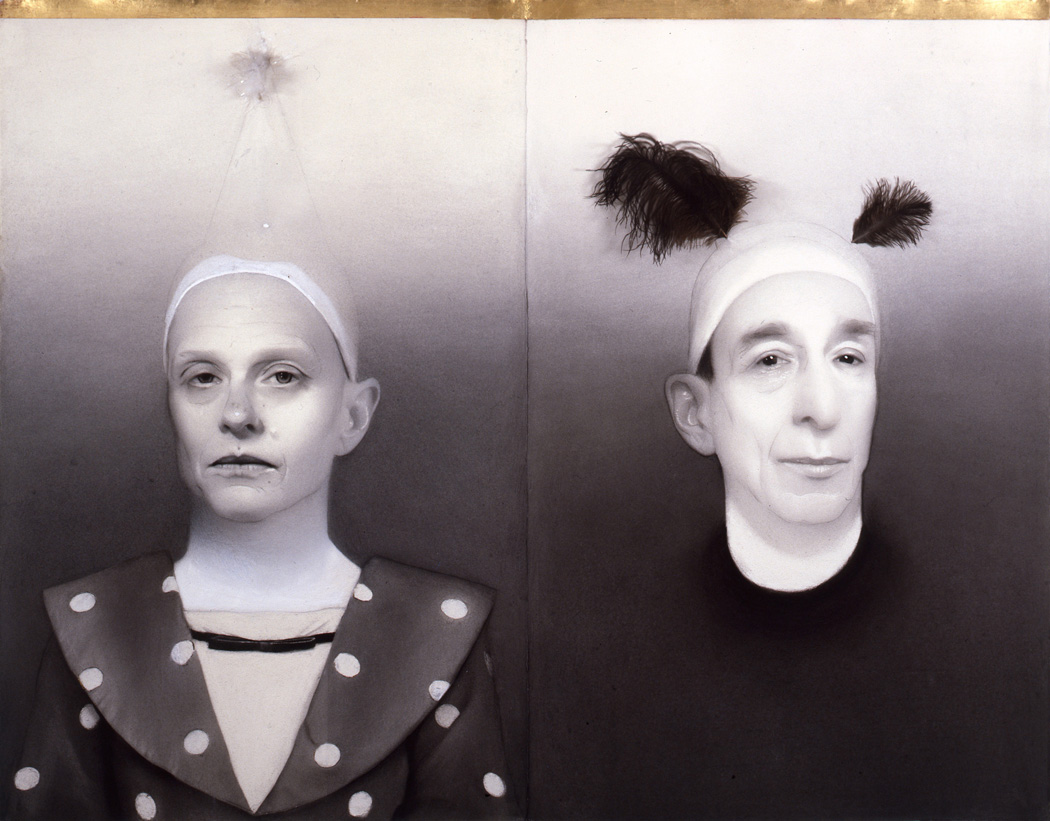
Portrait (with feathers), portrait of the artist (on the left) with her husband, Leonard Post, on the right. 2007.

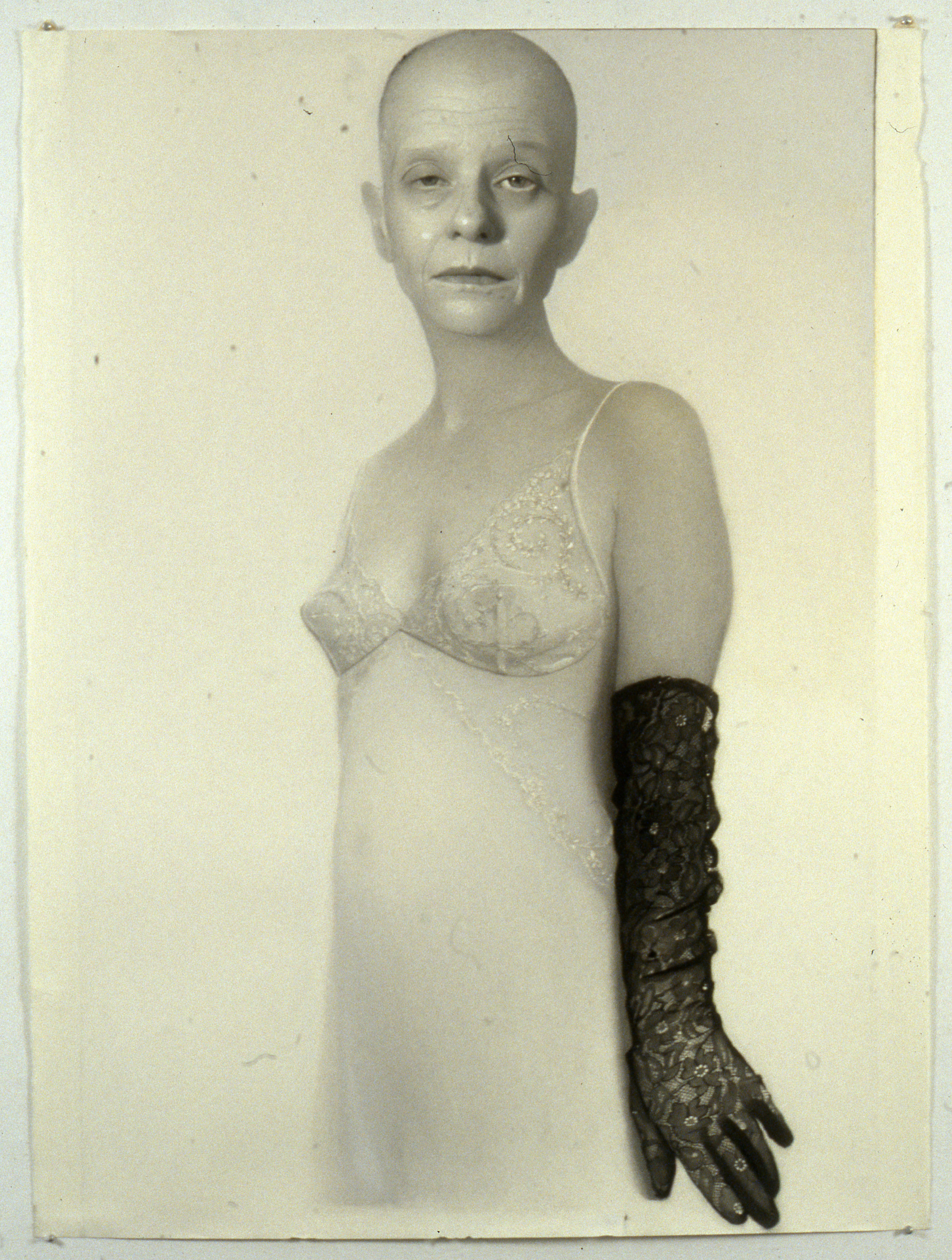
Self portrait (La Perla #2). 2006.

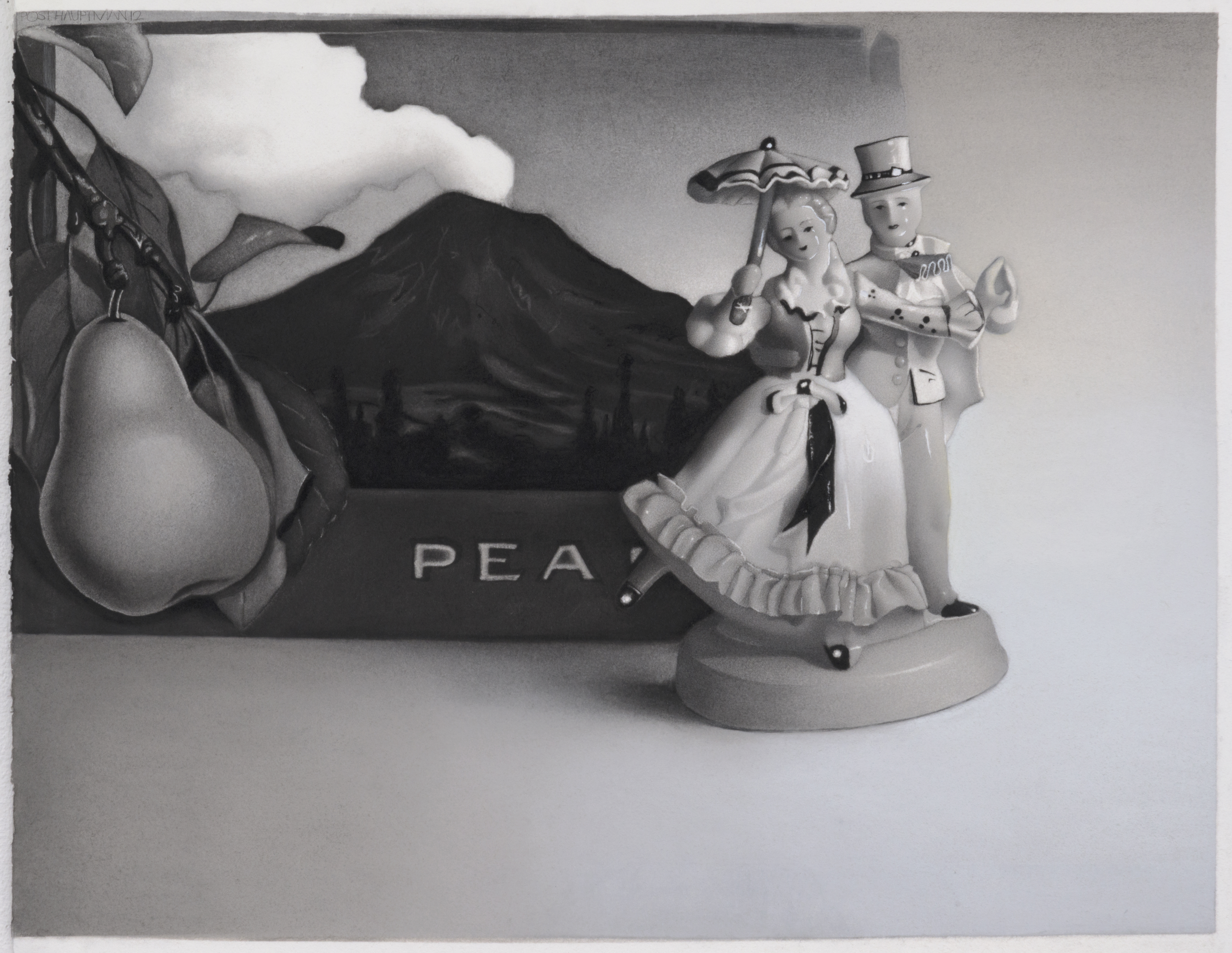

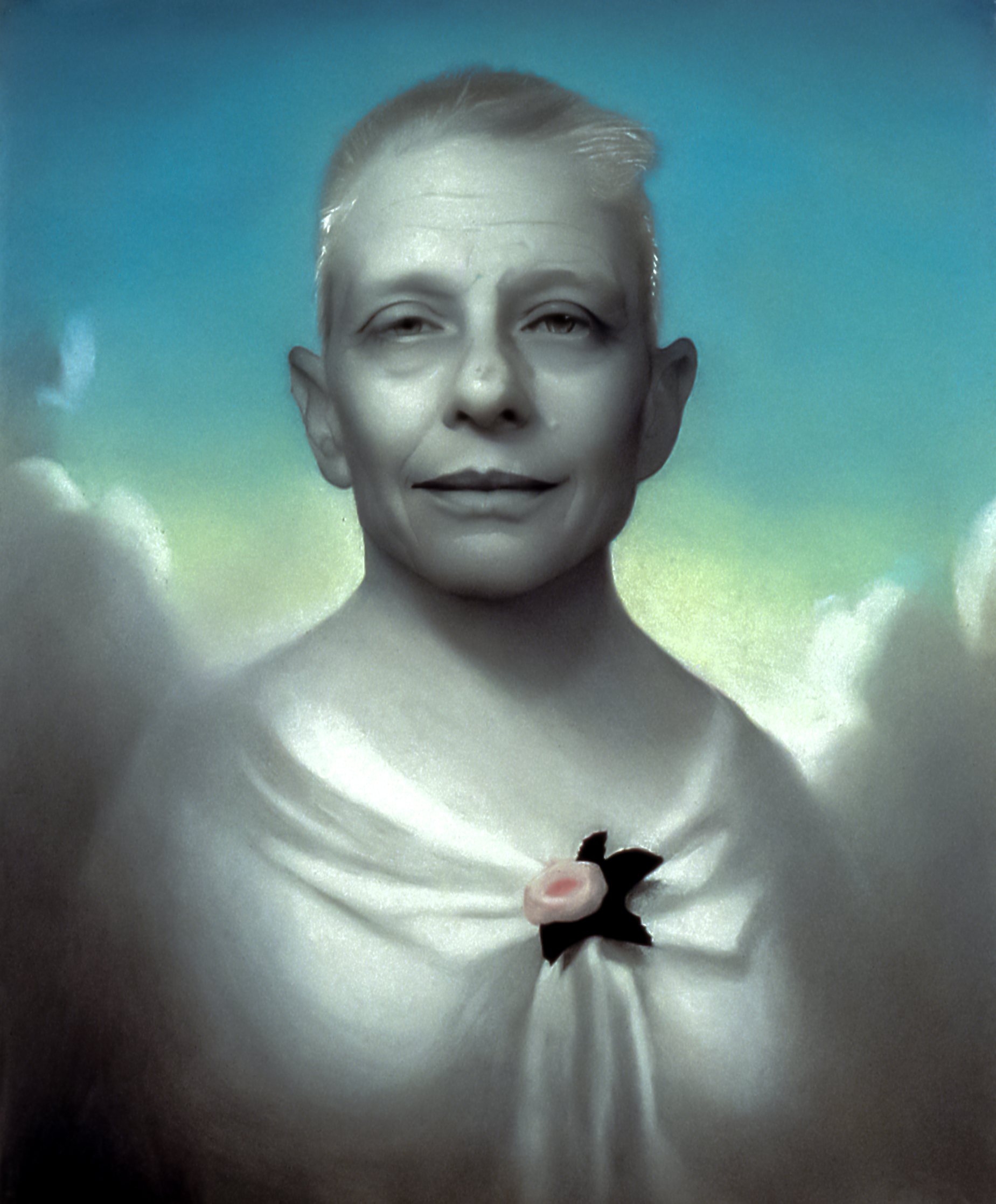
