= Sonoma Valley Museum of Art =

- Established: 1998
- Location: Sonoma, California, United States
- Coordinates: 38.2910°N 122.4583°W
- Type: Art museum
- Visitors: 16,500 (2009)
- Director: Linda Keaton
- Website: www.svma.org

The Sonoma Valley Museum of Art (known colloquially as the SVMA) is an art museum located in Sonoma, California, United States. Founded in 1998, the museum exhibits works by regional, national and international modern and contemporary artists.

== History ==
The museum was founded in 1998 and is Sonoma's only modern and contemporary museum. In 2011, the museum opened the Stanley Abercrombie and Paul Vieyra Art Library, based on a promised gift of 20,000 books from board members Stanley Abercrombie and Paul Vieyra. Housed in the Pamela and John Story Gallery, the museum's current collection of 2,500 art, architecture and design books serve as a public reference source. In 2016 the Museum Store opened, specializing in uniquely designed products made by local artists as well as international gifts of all kinds.

=== Unionization ===
On March 31, 2022, museum staff announced the formation of their union, Sonoma Cultural Workers United, with supermajority support. On April 8, director Linda Keaton shared a letter refusing voluntary recognition. On April 13, 2022, workers filed with the National Labor Relations Board for a federally supervised election. It was shortly thereafter disclosed that the museum had retained the services of the law firm Jackson Lewis. On May 18, 2022, the National Labor Relations Board overruled an objection raised by the museum, deciding in the workers' favor and ordering an election. On June 14, 2022, 93% of workers voted in favor of the union.

=== Architecture ===
SVMA's gallery space consists of 3,000 square feet, along with smaller other gallery spaces. In 2010 the SVMA installed a 25.9 kW solar electric system which serves to supply over 90% of the museum's power needs.

In November 2022, a parked car was pushed through the front window of the museum by an intoxicated driver, damaging a section of the front windows. The area was boarded up and a comic featuring a car crash was adhered to the surface.

== Exhibitions ==
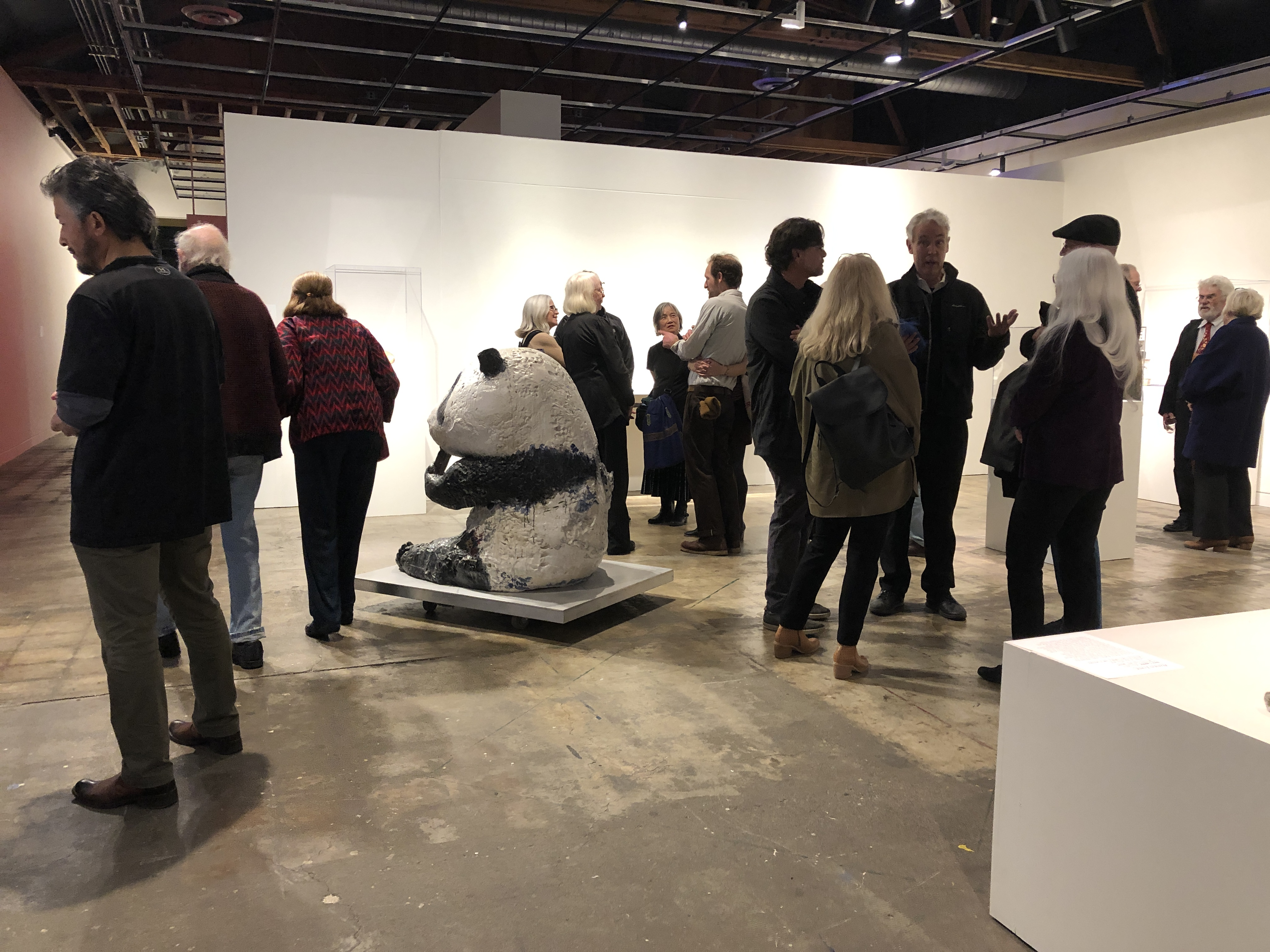
Exhibition opening of Richard Shaw and Wanxin Zhang show in 2019

The museum exhibits fine art by local, national and regional artists and does not maintain its own collection. SVMA utilizes works from private collections, artists, public institutions and related sources for their exhibitions. Every year the museum showcases the work of regional 4th and 5th graders in Art Rewards the Student. In 2019, approximately 12,700 visitors attended exhibitions and educational programming at the museum. SVMA generally hosts one to two exhibitions at the same time.

=== Notable exhibitions ===
The museum has exhibited the works of the likes of Richard Diebenkorn, Phillip K Smith III, Eleanor Coppola, David Hockney, Dario Robleto, Torolab and Nao Bustamante, Sandow Birk, Harry Callahan, Auguste Rodin, David Best, Mark di Suvero, and Jack Lenor Larsen.

==== Eco Chic: Towards Sustainable Swedish Fashion ====
Early 2011 brought the exhibition "Eco Chic" to SVMA, a show that showcases "Gron Mode" (Swedish for "Green Fashion") fashion by Swedish fashion designers. With a goal to educate and challenge visitors views of fashion, sustainability, and the green lifestyle, the exhibit showcases the clothing designs and their production methods. Artists featured in the exhibit include Julian Red and Anja Hynynen. "Eco Chic" was produced by the Swedish Institute and the Consulate General of Sweden San Francisco. The exhibition was described by art critic Juliane Porter as showing "smart and beautiful" clothing.

==== Fletcher Benton: The Artist's Studio ====
From November 2010 until February 2011 SVMA hosted a solo exhibition conceived by and about San Francisco kinetic artist Fletcher Benton. The exhibition, curated by Kate Eilersten, explored Benton's inspirations, creation process and the tools he utilizes to create his sculptures. Large scale works and maquettes were exhibited alongside large-scale photographs, sound elements, and a representation of Benton's work environment.

== Administration ==
The Sonoma Valley Museum of Art is a 501(c)(3) corporation governed by director Linda Keaton, and as of 2022 the museum is staffed by 24 full- and part-time employees. The museum has an active corp of volunteers with their own volunteer council. The board consists of 20 voting members and is led by president Ken Stokes. Members contribute to the institutions and receive complimentary admission, the museum newsletter, regional discounts at other institutions and other benefits based on their contribution level. Members are given the opportunity to vote by proxy at the annual meeting to elect the Board of Directors.

=== Mission ===
The mission stated on the museum website is "Building Community Around Art."

== Outreach ==
The museum offers student educational programming, lectures, workshops, tours, and internship opportunities. Art Rewards the Students (ARTS) places art instructors in 4th and 5th grade classrooms throughout Sonoma Valley. The program is sponsored by the local arts and community organizations. In the early 2010s Sonoma resident Calvin R. Vander Woude donated $100,000 towards expanding public and educational programming. This donation, along with funding from individual donations and the museum's annual Fund-A-Need campaign, has contributed to the renovation of previous storage spaces into classrooms.

== Events ==
SVMA hosts a few major events each year, as well as smaller events throughout.

=== Annual Gala ===
The museum's annual gala dinner and auction raises funds for the SVMA's annual budget and special projects. In 2010 the museum raised over $45,000, and the theme was Moulin Rouge and featured French-inspired art and entertainment. In 2021 the museum gala was held at the Donum Estate and raised more than $200,000. In 2022 the gala raised an undisclosed amount and the theme was "Imagine That."

=== Dia de los Muertos ===
Dia de los Muertos has in the past been celebrated, with the museum working with Sonoma Valley's large Latino population to host artistic and educational events. Altars were showcased within the museum, music, dance, and a community altar was featured on the outside of the museum entrance.

=== MIX ===
The museum has in the past hosted an after-hours mixer called MIX, featuring local musicians, cocktails and special activities related to SVMA's current exhibitions, all geared towards adult patrons.
