= Elizabeth King (artist) =

American artist

- Born: Ann Arbor, Michigan, United States
- Education: San Francisco Art Institute
- Known for: Sculpture, animation, installation art, photography
- Spouse: Carlton Newton
- Awards: Guggenheim Fellowship, Anonymous Was a Woman Award, American Academy of Arts and Letters, National Endowment for the Arts
- Website: Elizabeth King

Elizabeth King, Pupil, porcelain, glass eyes, carved wood, brass; half life-size, dimensions vary: all joints movable; 1987–90. Hirshhorn Museum and Sculpture Garden.

Elizabeth King is an American sculptor and writer known for movable figurative sculptures that she has employed in stop-frame animations. Her work combines exacting handcraft, elementary mechanics, and digital and electronic technologies, applied in sculptures of half or full figures (generally scaled at half life-size), heads, arms and hands, or even simply eyes. She often equips figures with subtly illuminated eyes and visible and invisible mechanisms enabling the performance of anatomically correct simple operations, seemingly of their own volition. Writers have described her figures as "insistently nonhuman" yet "uncannily alive" in their ability to project self-awareness, intelligence, agency and emotion. They reflect her interests in early clockwork automata, the history of the mannequin and puppet, literature involving unnatural figures come to life, and human movement. Art in America critic Leah Ollman wrote that King's "highly articulated automatons invite us to consider how consciousness arises from physical being … she portrays her mechanical surrogates as convincingly self-aware, while we are left to ponder that age-old question: where exactly does the self reside?"

King has received a Guggenheim Fellowship, Anonymous Was a Woman Award, and American Academy of Arts and Letters Award, among others. She has exhibited in diverse venues ranging from commercial galleries and museums such as MASS MoCA and MAK (Museum of Applied Arts, Vienna) to the San Francisco Exploratorium and the American Psychiatric Association annual conference. Her work belongs to public art collections including the Metropolitan Museum of Art, Los Angeles County Museum of Art (LACMA), Hirshhorn Museum, and Museum of Fine Arts, Houston.

== Education and early career ==
King was born in Ann Arbor, Michigan in 1950 and studied at the San Francisco Art Institute, earning BFA (1972) and MFA (1973) degrees in sculpture. She began attracting attention in the 1970s for theatrical, tableau-like works in exhibitions at the Richmond Art Center, Oakland Museum, San Jose Museum of Art, San Francisco Museum of Modern Art, and Hansen-Fuller Gallery, among others. This work combined found materials and crafted objects and employed marionette-style puppets (often caricature-like heads attached to jointed, skeletal bodies), kinetic and participatory elements, and narrative. Reviews compared them to early 20th-century musée mécanique (penny arcade games)—toylike in operation and scale, yet involving themes of pain and isolation, as well as wonder at the workings of the human body. For example, Theater (1972–3) involved a hinged wooden box attached to a chair that closed around a viewer's head and contained a mechanized, miniature theater "set" with a puppet of an old woman; it suggested a metaphor for interiority (being "inside one's head") or the notion of the "Cartesian theater"—the brain as a private chamber occupied by a homunculus.

Elizabeth King, Idea for a Mechanical Eye, cast acrylic, carved wood, brass, springs; eyeball diameter .75"; eye, eyelids and socket independently movable; 1988–90. Eyeball made in collaboration with ocularist Earle C. Schreiber. Hood Museum of Art.

In 1983, King and her husband, sculptor Carlton Newton, moved to Williamsburg, Virginia to accept teaching positions. She joined the Department of Sculpture and Extended Media at Virginia Commonwealth University in 1985, teaching there until retiring in 2015. In her art, King had turned almost exclusively to figurative sculptures by the 1980s, producing intimately scaled works that she gradually refined by perfecting traditional crafts such as carving, modeling, casting bronze, firing porcelain, woodworking and glass-eye-making. In these works modeled on herself and female relatives (e.g., Portrait of M, 1983), she incorporated an increasing level of realism and a more fully articulated range of movement recalling 18th-century automata rather than dolls or puppets. One of these works, the half-figure Pupil (1987–90), would continue to appear in several later installation, animation and photographic works.

== Later works and exhibitions ==
Beginning in the 1990s, King received wider recognition for meticulous figurative sculptures (of jointed full figures, heads, hands, arms, an isolated eye) exhibited with a greater emphasis on gesture, movement, and in presentation, on illusion and stagecraft. Sculpture described King's exhibition at Nancy Drysdale (1993) as "probing the fine line between human and machine" through "a painstaking search for the perfect gesture." The mutability of her figures—in terms of anatomically correct poses as well as context, across different exhibitions and media—is a key feature of King's art, related in part to the longstanding influence of traditional Japanese Bunraku theater, which employs puppets in different roles across performances. The notion of an inexhaustible range of poses complicates the status of her sculptures, implying a past and future, while also situating them in an indeterminate place between object or statue and robot.

Her miniaturized figures have been made in porcelain, wood, glass and brass, and employed disconcertingly lifelike details such as gently raised veins, creases and wrinkles, eyebrows composed of her own collected lashes, hand-blown glass eyes and functioning joints. Their operations can involve hidden spring-loaded elements, magnets, pendulums and fiber optics, and visible hinged doors and exposed joints that intentionally break with illusionism. The joints, magnets and components that allow a sculpture to be posed and moved are an essential part of the finished image, with both sculpture and mechanism working equally to represent the alive, moving body. Writing about King's exhibition, "Attention's Loop" (Mary Ingraham Bunting Institute, 1997), Marty Carlock suggested that such "peculiar dichotomies" created an aesthetic tension that fed into viewers' fascination with how both machines and humans work.

Elizabeth King, Bartlett's Hands, sculpture (carved and jointed English boxwood), LCD screen, hidden computer, dedicated lighting; half life-size hand set before screen playing a stop-motion animation of the hand; 2005.

King's later shows placed her sculptures in a widening range of contexts—custom vitrines, display cases also housing her source materials, multimedia installations—that used minimal means to convey emotional and psychological nuance: subtle movement, acute attention to pose, spare lighting and careful composition. These elements especially came into play when she began to "cast" her figures in photographic series and stop-frame animations involving painstaking pose adjustments in which they performed self-reflexive movements or simple tasks. These subtle, involuntary gestures—attuned to slight shifts in the tilt of the head or the touching of fingers, which can variously signal cognition, introspection, suspicion, or resignation, for example—often revealed ways the body unconsciously responds when the mind is active.

For example, What Happened (35mm, 1991/2008, collaboration with Richard Kizu-Blair) depicted King's sculpture, Pupil, in a responsive state reacting to unknown stimuli with common but eloquent actions: the tilt of the head while smelling, the tandem movement of fingers and eyes while sensing objects; Attention's Loop (1997) comprised 25 vignettes of a figure initiating and completing a gesture. New York Times critic Roberta Smith wrote about the simple movements of figures in the works Eidolon and The Sizes of Things in the Mind's Eye (both 1999), "at times the melancholy innocence of these creatures (enhanced by their newbornlike baldness) gives you a view of the human soul in its perpetual isolation."

King has created several installations that juxtapose physical sculptures with their virtual, animated doubles. Quizzing Glass (2005) featured a fabricated single eye with movable, carved wooden lids and a video animation projected through a glass lens that appeared to hover in space, coming into focus only from a certain vantage point. In Bartlett's Hands (2005), she optically joined a hand-carved, posed wooden hand with a projected animation (made from 6,350 still images of the hand), using a wooden frame set at an exact viewing distance that made them appear equivalent in size and presence.

Critics suggest that King's co-presentation of work across media—and the resulting discrepancies in scale, substance and identification—create a sense of uncertainty and uncanniness that blurs perceptual boundaries between actual and virtual object, illusion and reality, human and non-human. Nancy Princenthal has noted King's shared concerns with other illusionistic figurative sculptors regarding artificial life and intelligence and the question of where "inanimate matter gives way to vital spirit." However, she contends that King's main interest lies less in technology, cyborgs or dystopias than in "a more innocent kind of wonder, something like the unrepeatable dumbfoundedness that … greeted the first moving pictures, or automatons." This sense is often conveyed through her figures' vivid, unblinking eyes, which invite considerations of consciousness and self-consciousness, vision as perceptual system, and connections between sensation, attention and understanding.

Elizabeth King, exhibition "Radical Small", photographs from the edition "Eight Views of a Sculpture," MASS MoCA, 2017–8.

In her traveling mid-career retrospective, "The Sizes of Things in the Mind’s Eye," (2007–9, initiated at Richmond Center for Visual Arts) and an earlier show at Kent Gallery (2006), King exhibited 25 years' worth of objects, including display cases and tables of antique wooden mannequins, acrylic and glass eyes, her own sculptures, half-scale figures in plaster and bronze, paper cutouts of body parts, and multimedia installations. The shows were described as evoking both her warehouse-size studio and a 16th-century cabinet of curiosities, with their "mix of obsolete, recent and not-yet-quite-born contributing to an odd temporal skid." King's 2015 show at Danese/Corey centered on the installation Compass, which consisted of two wooden hands reaching for each other, one activated by a magnet at its base. Her exhibition "Radical Small" at MASS MoCA (2017) paired large-scale projected animation side-by-side with the small-scale sculpture used to make it, while introducing a new, live filmmaking component in the gallery as its centerpiece. King worked in front of viewers with stop-motion animator Mike Belzer on a custom-built, vibration-free platform stage for seven days, painstakingly setting in motion a pair of jointed boxwood hands through a series of changing poses.

== Writing ==
King has written extensively about automatons and other concerns related to her art. Leah Ollman described her book, Attention’s Loop (A Sculptor’s Reverie on the Coexistence of Substance and Spirit) (1999), as an intellectual, sensual and practical chronicle of the conception and creation of her work that "braids together philosophical and phenomenological musings with anecdotes, childhood memories, studio notes, fairy tales and legends." Her sculpture Pupil is the book's main visual subject, depicted in photographs by Katherine Wetzel that explore representation and deception, and artificial and human.

King's second book, written with clockmaker and conservator W. David Todd and entailing more than 20 years of research, is a detailed history of a Renaissance automaton and seven contemporary artificial figures, titled Miracles and Machines: A Sixteenth-Century Automaton and Its Legend (2023). The book's main subject is a 16", carved automaton in the Smithsonian Institution collection commonly known as "The Monk"—according to legend, a depiction of the Spanish Franciscan friar and saint Diego de Alcalá, whose preserved remains were allegedly involved in a miracle at the court of Phillip II of Spain. The figure has been attributed to the workshop of the clockmaker Juanelo Turriano; when wound, it walks a slow seven-point path, prays and waves a cross, beats its chest, shifts its gaze and lifts the cross to its lips to kiss it. The book dissects the figure, its parts and mechanisms, and the other automata and their connections to magic and mathematics, faith and technology, and the restoration of life, in the past and present. The monk is also the subject of a shorter essay, "Perpetual Devotion: A Sixteenth-Century Machine That Prays," that appears in the book Genesis Redux: Essays in the History and Philosophy of Artificial Life (2007).

== Recognition ==
King has been recognized with a Guggenheim Fellowship (2002) and awards from Anonymous Was a Woman (2014), the American Academy of Arts and Letters (2006), Harvard Radcliffe Institute (1996), Virginia Commission for the Arts (1996), and the National Endowment for the Arts (1988). She has also received artist residencies from the Robert Rauschenberg Foundation (2017) and Dartmouth College (2008). In 2017, she was elected a member of the National Academy of Design. She is the subject of a documentary film, Double Take: The Art of Elizabeth King (2018), directed by Olympia Stone.

King's work belongs to the public collections of the Hirshhorn Museum and Sculpture Garden, Hood Museum of Art, Los Angeles County Museum of Art, Metropolitan Museum of Art, Museum of Fine Arts, Houston, Sheldon Museum of Art, Virginia Museum of Fine Arts, as well as to institutional and university collections.
