= Charles Deems =

American Methodist minister (1820–1893)

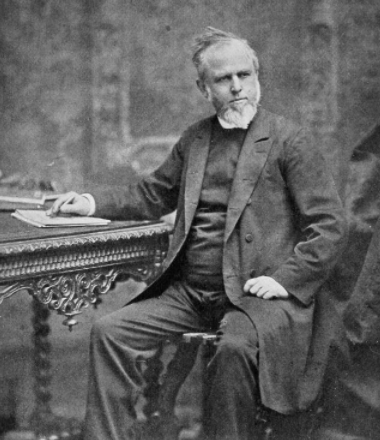
- Born: December 4, 1820; Baltimore, Maryland, U.S.
- Died: November 18, 1893 (aged 72); New York, New York, U.S.
- Education: Dickinson College
- Occupation: Clergyman
- Children: 3 sons

Charles (Alexander) Force Deems (December 4, 1820 – November 18, 1893) was an American Methodist minister. He was the pastor of the non-denominational Church of the Strangers in New York City from 1868 to 1893.

== Early life ==
Deems was born in Baltimore, Maryland. As a child, he delivered lectures on temperance and on Sunday schools before he was fourteen years old. He graduated from Dickinson College in 1839.

== Career ==
Deems taught and preached in New York City for a few months, and in 1840 took charge of the Methodist Episcopal church at Asbury, New Jersey, and removed in the next year to North Carolina, where he was General Agent for the American Bible Society.

Deems was professor of logic and rhetoric at the University of North Carolina from 1842 to 1847, and professor of natural sciences at Randolph Macon College (then at Boydton, Virginia) in 1847–1848, and after two years of preaching at New Bern, North Carolina, he held for four years (1850–1854) the presidency of Greensboro, N. C. Female College. He continued as a Methodist Episcopal clergyman at various pastorates in North Carolina from 1854 to 1865, for the last seven years being a presiding elder and from 1859 to 1863 being the proprietor of St Austins Institute, Wilson.

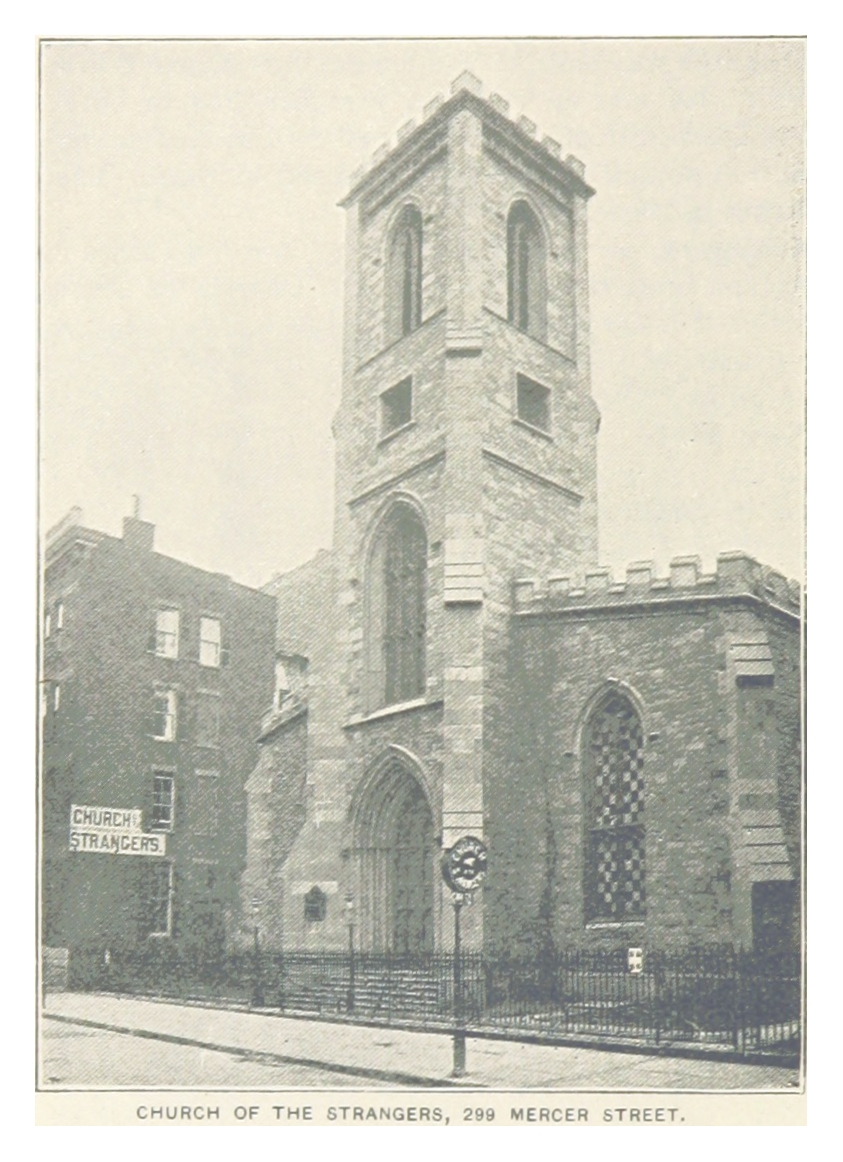
Church of the Strangers, 399 Mercer Street

Deems settled in New York City in 1865, and he began preaching in the chapel of New York University in 1866. In 1868, he established and became the pastor of the non-denominational Church of the Strangers, which in 1870 occupied the former Mercer Street Presbyterian Church, purchased and given to Deems by Cornelius Vanderbilt; there he remained until his death in New York City in November 1893.

Deems attended the Baltimore conference of the Methodist Episcopal Church, South in 1870. He was influential in securing from Vanderbilt the endowment of Vanderbilt University in Nashville, Tennessee.

Deems was one of the founders (1881) and president of the American Institute of Christian Philosophy and for ten years was editor of its journal, Christian Thought. Deems was an earnest temperance advocate; as early as 1852 he worked (unsuccessfully) for a general prohibition law in North Carolina, and in his later years allied himself with the Prohibition Party.

== Personal life, death and legacy ==
Deems had two sons, Theodore and Francis, who both served in the Confederate States Army during the Civil War, and a third son, Edward Mark Deems, the pastor of Sailors' Snug Harbor.

Deems died in New York on November 18, 1893. The Charles F. Deems Lectureship in Philosophy was founded in his honor in 1895 at New York University by the American Institute of Christian Philosophy. His autobiography was finished by his two sons and published posthumously.

== Works ==
=== As an editor ===
- The Southern Methodist Episcopal Pulpit (1846–1852)
- The Annals of Southern Methodism (1855–1857)
- Devotional Melodies (1842)

=== As an author ===
- The Life of Dr Adam Clarke (1840)
- The Triumph of Peace and other Poems (1840)
- The Home Altar (1850)
- Jesus or The Light of the Nations (1872)
- Sermons (1885)
- And The Light Shineth In Darkness (1884)
- The Gospel of Common Sense (1888)
- The Gospel of Spiritual Insight (1891)
- My Septuagint (1892)
- Autobiography (New York, 1897)
