= Mundy Hepburn =

American artist

Mundy Hepburn is an American artist who designs and builds glass sculptures filled with luminous electrified inert gases—the same technology used in neon signs. Hepburn developed many of the glass and lighting techniques he uses in his sculptures himself.

Hepburn lives in Old Saybrook, Connecticut. He is the nephew of actress Katharine Hepburn.
