= Torolab =

Artist collective in Tijuana

- Established: July 25, 1995; 31 years ago
- Founder: Raúl Cárdenas Osuna
- Type: Art collective
- Headquarters: Tijuana, Baja California, Mexico
- Website: www.torolab.org

Torolab is an artist collective, workshop and laboratory of contextual studies that identifies situations or phenomena of interest for research, basing the studies in the realm of life styles to better grasp the idea of quality of life. Founded in Tijuana in 1995 by Raúl Cárdenas Osuna.

Their work has been shown nationally and internationally at various venues including: The Museum of Modern Art, New York; the Museum of Modern Art of Louisiana, Denmark; Museum of Contemporary Art of San Diego; LA(X)ART, Los Angeles; Moderna Museet, Stockholm; San Francisco Museum of Modern Art; the Museum of Contemporary Art of Sydney; the Storefront for Art and Architecture, New York; Havana Biennial; Liverpool Biennial; Beijing 2004 Biennial of Architecture; Mercosur Biennale, Brazil; and Lyon Biennale, France. Their work is in private and public collections such as the Museum of Contemporary Art of San Diego and the Jumex collection in Mexico. The collective has received twice The American Center foundation award and a Rockefeller Foundation grant. Their work and articles have been published at New York Times, TIME magazine, Harvard's Political Review, Boston Globe, Surface, Wallpaper, I.D., among others.

== Biography ==
Raúl Cárdenas Osuna (Mazatlán, Sinaloa, 1969) holds a degree in architecture from the Universidad Iberoamericana in Tijuana as well as a Master of Fine Arts degree from the University of California, San Diego.

He has taught at CENTRO (Mexico City) and the Universidad Iberoamericana’s School of Architecture (Tijuana) in Mexico; at the San Francisco Art Institute and the California College of the Arts in the US; and Rennes 2 University in France.

In October 2011, Raúl Cárdenas was awarded for best arts-intervention project with social impact by Harvard’s Cultural Agents Initiative and on December has been named Person of the year by Tijuana’s newspaper ‘Frontera’. Right now, he also directs the non-profit organization ‘Sociedad de Agentes de Cambio’ and is the director of the Digital table for the Metropolitan Strategic Plan of Tecate-Rosarito-Tijuana, where he currently lives and works.

== Appearances ==
- The Artists Experiment Initiative at The Museum of Modern Art in 2013.
- World Health Day 2012 | Raúl Cárdenas Osuna, Molecular Urbanism: Design and Quality of Life at Tufts University.
- Pase Usted | Raúl Cárdenas / Torolab: La salud y la calidad de vida in 2009.
