= George Deem =

American painter

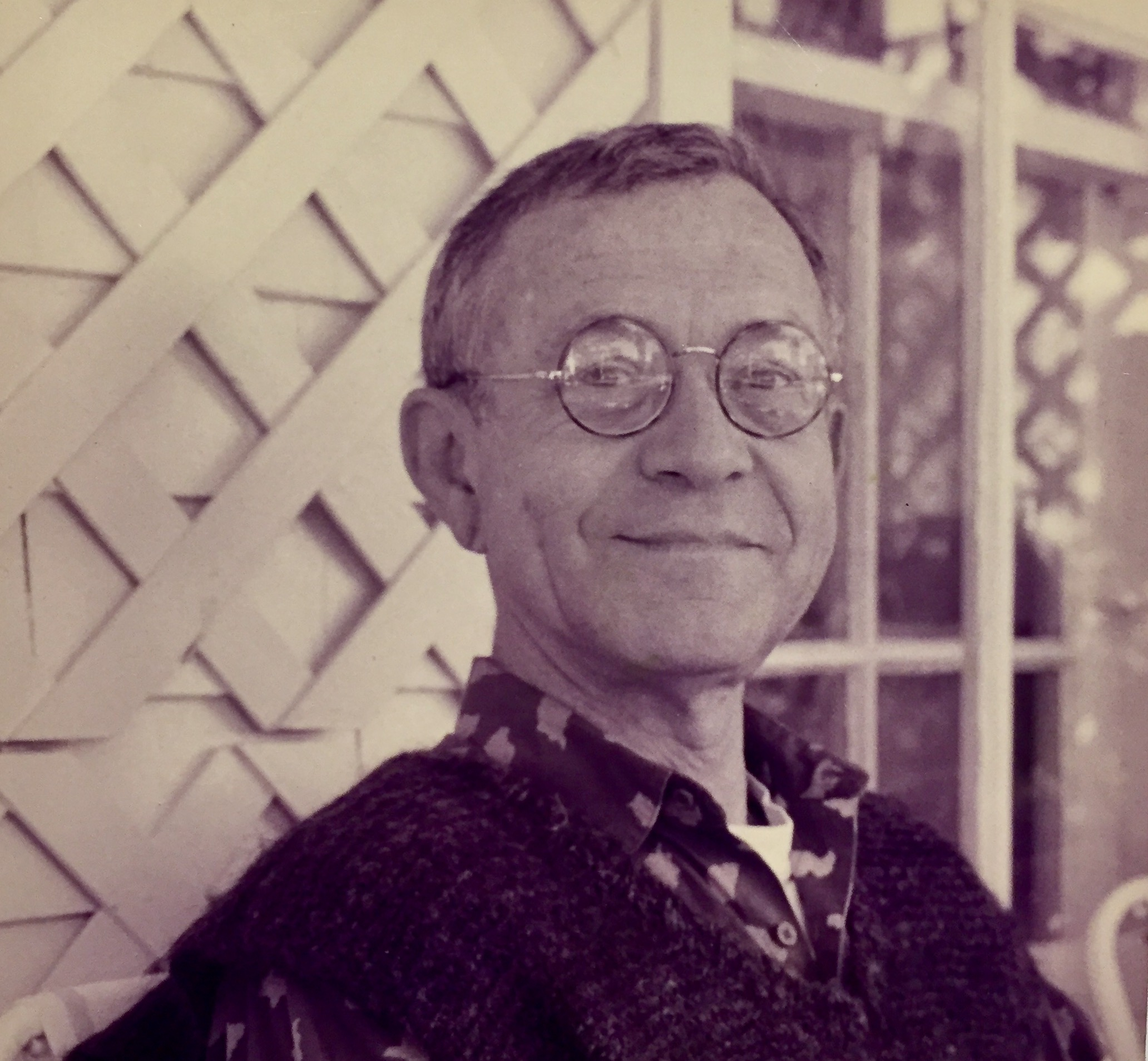
- Born: George Charles Deem Jr. August 18, 1932; Vicennes, Indiana, U.S.
- Died: August 11, 2008 (aged 75); New York City, New York, U.S.
- Education: School of the Art Institute of Chicago
- Occupation: Artist
- Website: https://georgedeem.org

George Charles Deem Jr. (August 18, 1932 – August 11, 2008) was an American artist best known for reproducing vivid re-workings of classic images from art history. Art historian Robert Rosenblum has called Deem's unconventional thematic choices "free-flowing [fantasy] about the facts and fictions of art history."

== Early life and education ==
Deem was born and raised in Vincennes, Indiana, the son of George Charles Deem Sr. and Laura Bobe Deem. He had a twin brother, John. He left his parents' farm to attend the School of the Art Institute of Chicago. A year later, in 1953, the United States Army drafted him. After serving in Germany, he returned and completed his degree. In 1981 he received an outstanding alumni award from Vincennes University.

== Career ==
Deem worked at the Metropolitan Museum of Art in the late 1950s. He taught painting at the School of Visual Arts from 1965 to 1966, at Leicester College of Art and Technology from 1966 to 1967, and at the University of Pennsylvania in 1968. He held residencies at the Evansville Museum of Art and Science (1979), the MacDowell Colony (1979), Illinois State University (1982), and The Branson School (1995). He served on the executive committee of the MacDowell Colony Fellows from 1982 to 1984.

Among the artists whose work he reproduced and reworked were Caravaggio, Jean-Baptiste-Siméon Chardin, Jean Auguste Dominique Ingres, Winslow Homer, Andrea Mantegna, Henri Matisse, Pablo Picasso and, especially, Johannes Vermeer, about whose style he wrote a book. "When I quote the painting of another artist," he explained, "I integrate the quoted work into a new composition with its own design and structure and inherent meaning. That meaning includes the recognition that every painting has in it the possibility of another painting."

Critics found his paintings clever and fun, but sometimes obscure. "George Deem's paintings are a challenge and an absorbing puzzle," said a 1978 critic. "To fully appreciate his low-key wit one needs more than a nodding acquaintance with the old masters." "Deem's paintings are clever one-liners that are fun to look at, particularly if you're familiar with the original artworks," noted a critic in 1994.

== Selected publications ==
- Deem, George (1993). Art School. Chronicle Books. ISBN 978-0-8118-0414-1
- Deem, George (2004). How to Paint a Vermeer: A Painter's History of Art. Thames & Hudson. ISBN 978-0-500-28509-1

== Personal life and legacy ==
Deem traveled the United States speaking and exhibiting his art, but lived most of his life at 10 West 18th Street in New York's Flatiron District. He died of lung cancer in Manhattan in 2008, at the age of 75. In 2012, the exhibition The Art of Friendship: The Collection of George Deem ran at the New Britain Museum of American Art in Connecticut.
