= Paul Catanese (artist) =

American hybrid media artist

- Born: 1975 (age 50–51); United States
- Education: Master of Fine Arts, School of the Art Institute of Chicago
- Known for: New Media Art, Hybrid art, Printmaking, Post-digital art
- Notable work: Visible From Space, Century of Progress / Sleep, Misplaced Reliquary, Digital Cornell Boxes
- Awards: Fulbright U.S. Scholar (2024), Christian A. Johnson Endeavor Foundation Artist-in-Residence at Colgate University (2018-19), Efroymson Contemporary Art Fellowship (2014)
- Website: http://www.paulcatanese.com/

Paul Catanese (born 1975) is a hybrid media artist, author, educator, and Fulbright U.S. Scholar whose work combines installation, performance, sound, video, printmaking, and digital media. His research and writing on post-digital printmaking examine the integration of digital fabrication with traditional print processes, including in the co-authored book Post-Digital Printmaking: CNC, Traditional and Hybrid Techniques (2012). His projects include electronic artists’ books for the Game Boy Advance, the decade-long aerial-imaging project Visible From Space, and experimental operas combining computational media, historical research, and performance.

== Work ==
Catanese's early digital projects explored the Game Boy Advance as a platform for electronic artists' books. In July 2004, the Whitney Museum of American Art presented Virtual Artist's Books for the Gameboy Advance through its artport program, now held in the Whitney's collection. Also in 2004, Rhizome commissioned Misplaced Reliquary, a related work created for online presentation and as a Game Boy Advance ROM. Catanese's Game Boy projects were the subject of a 2006 feature in the Akron Beacon Journal. Alex Custodio discusses these projects in the 2020 MIT Press monograph Who Are You? Nintendo's Game Boy Advance Platform.

Catanese has traced his engagement with printmaking to a 2004 fellowship residency at the Kala Art Institute. He described a formal resonance between setting lead type for letterpress and programming individual pixels in his black-and-white Game Boy Advance animations, which led him to develop a digital relief process combining custom drawing software, CNC machining, and traditional relief printing. These hybrid methods were examined in detail in the 2012 book Post-Digital Printmaking: CNC, Traditional and Hybrid Techniques co-authored by Catanese and Angela Geary. Reviewing the book for Printeresting, Jason Urban emphasized its integration of traditional and computer-assisted processes and its account of printmakers as researchers working with new materials and technologies. In a 2021 profile for Printmaking Today, Zuzanna Dyrda identified the matrix as an organizing principle across Catanese's practice, extending beyond conventional printmaking into performance, data, virtual reality, and sound.

His ten-year Visible From Space project developed from experiments with aerial recording, cartography, and the scale of images. During a 2010 residency at the Goldwell Open Air Museum, an early iteration inaugurated the Digital Media Exhibition Platform of Leonardo Electronic Almanac. Further development was supported by a 2014 Efroymson Contemporary Arts Fellowship and a residency at PLAYA in Oregon. For its 2016 presentation in the Sidney R. Yates Gallery at the Chicago Cultural Center, Catanese installed a camera-equipped helium blimp above a field of reflective material and cartographic objects. Footage recorded during repeated flights was edited into a changing video projection.

Writing in Hyperallergic, Philip A. Hartigan interpreted the work as an inquiry into visual records, surveillance, and the reliability of photographic evidence. William L. Fox, writing for the Nevada Museum of Art, situated the project within the history of aerial observation and questioned the assumption that elevated viewpoints provide objective or reliable knowledge. The museum's Institute for Art + Environment holds the Paul Catanese: Visible from Space archive, which contains video, photographs, printed ephemera, and notes relating to the project. Reviewing the project for Furtherfield, Patrick Lichty described it as a "hybrid drawing dirigible telepresence opera".

Catanese subsequently developed Century of Progress / Sleep as a cross-disciplinary opera combining performance and immersive media. During the 2018–19 academic year, he was the Christian A. Johnson Endeavor Foundation Artist-in-Residence at Colgate University, where he expanded the work from a solo performance into an ensemble production combining multiple voices, live musicians, electronically processed vocals, and full-dome imagery. The residency culminated in April 2019 performances in the university's Ho Tung Visualization Laboratory, a digital planetarium. Later that year, a residency through the SPACES World Artists Program in Cleveland supported a gallery installation and ensemble performance. Dyrda also connected the opera to Catanese's broader performative approach and emphasis on process.

In Bruno's Infinities, Catanese continued to use opera as a framework for combining historical research, image, sound, and performance. Writing in Bad at Sports in 2024, Paul Krainak described the project as developing the visual and musical components of a "sprawling lost opera" from materials concerning Giordano Bruno. The project incorporated artificial intelligence and historical research; its initial phase consisted of digital inkjet prints and motion studies intended as the basis for a performance installation. Catanese proposed and developed the project as part of his 2024 Fulbright research at the Eugeniusz Geppert Academy of Art and Design in Wrocław. Krainak situated the work within Catanese's broader use of chance and his continued engagement with drawing, printmaking, and sculpture alongside technological media.

== Education and academic career ==
Catanese earned an MFA in Art and Technology from the School of the Art Institute of Chicago in 2000. He was an assistant professor of new media at San Francisco State University from 2003 to 2008 and subsequently joined Columbia College Chicago, where he became a professor and director of graduate study for Art and Art History.

From 2009 to 2014, Catanese served as president of the New Media Caucus, an international nonprofit association and affiliate society of the College Art Association. In 2024, he was a Fulbright U.S. Scholar in Poland, conducting research on connections between artificial intelligence and printmaking at the Eugeniusz Geppert Academy of Art and Design in Wrocław.

== Selected publications ==
- Catanese, Paul (2001). Director's Third Dimension: Fundamentals of 3D Programming in Director 8.5. Que. ISBN 978-0-672-32228-0.
- Catanese, Paul; Geary, Angela (2012). Post-Digital Printmaking: CNC, Traditional and Hybrid Techniques. London: A&C Black. ISBN 978-1-4081-2494-9.
