= List of San Francisco Art Institute people =

This is a list of notable people from the San Francisco Art Institute (1871–2022); which was formerly known as the California School of Design (1871–1915, or CSD), and California School of Fine Arts (1916–1960, or CSFA). It was also sometimes referred to as the Mark Hopkins Institute of Art (c. 1893–1906), for a building the school had occupied.

== Notable alumni ==
=== Academia ===
- Kim Anno (BFA 1983, MFA 1985), abstract painter, photographer, filmmaker; department chair and professor at California College of the Arts
- Anthony Aziz (MFA 1990), of the duo Aziz + Cucher, pioneer in the field of fine art digital imaging and post-photography, professor of fine arts and associate dean of faculty at Parsons School of Design
- Lewis Baltz (BFA 1969), photographer, educator, former professor for photography at the European Graduate School
- Ernest Briggs (attended 1947 to 1951), abstract expressionist painter, educator; professor at Pratt Institute from 1961 to 1984
- Nao Bustamante (BFA, MFA), performance art, academic administrator at the University of Southern California
- Enrique Chagoya (BFA 1984), Mexican-born American painter, printmaker; professor of art and art history at Stanford University
- Charles Chapel Judson (attended), painter; founding professor and chair of the art department at the University of California, Berkeley from 1902 to 1923
- Stephanie Syjuco (BFA 1995), Filipino-born American conceptual artist, sculptor, educator; assistant professor at the University of California, Berkeley
- Aaron Flint Jamison (MFA, New Genres, 2006), conceptual artist and educator, associate professor at University of Washington
- Candice Lin (MFA, New Genres, 2004), interdisciplinary artist and educator, associate professor at UCLA
- Whitney Lynn (MFA, New Genres, 2007), interdisciplinary artist and educator, associate professor at University of Washington
- Taravat Talepasand (MFA, Painting, 2006), interdisciplinary artist and educator, of Iranian descent; former chair of the painting department and assistant professor at Portland State University
- Neil Williams (BFA 1959), abstract painter, educator; professor at the School of Visual Arts in the 1980s to 1990s

=== Artists ===
==== Art collectives ====
- Aziz + Cucher, digital imaging duo who met at SFAI
- Bull.Miletic, video installation and new media art duo who met at SFAI in new genres MFA program
- Otto and Vivika Heino, husband-and-wife ceramics duo; only Vivika attended SFAI

==== Illustration and comics ====
- Jeremy Fish (BFA 1997), illustrator, painter
- Rea Irvin (attended c. 1910s), illustrator, comic artist, graphic artist; first art editor of The New Yorker
- Darrell McClure (BFA), illustrator, comic artist
- Jimmy Swinnerton (attended 1890), cartoonist, landscape painter
- Adolph Treidler (attended 1902 to 1903), illustrator; known for wartime propaganda posters

==== Mixed media and installation art ====
- Joyce Burstein (BFA/MFA), sculpture, public art, and social action.
- Russell Crotty (BFA 1978), sculpture, bookmaking, large-format drawings
- Wally Hedrick (BFA 1955), painting, sculpture, assemblage, educator
- David Ireland (MFA 1974), sculptor, conceptual artist, installation artist, minimalist architect
- Guy Overfelt (MFA 1996), multi-disciplinary post-conceptual art
- Jason Rhoades (BFA 1988), installation art
- Gelah Penn (BFA), installation and mixed-media artist
- Sarah Biscarra-Dilley (BFA 2015), Native American interdisciplinary artist, curator, writer, and member of the Black Salt Collective
- Laurie Steelink (BFA 1984), Native American multidisciplinary artist and curator, assemblage, installation.
- Stephanie Syjuco (BFA 2005), Filipino-born American conceptual artist, sculptor, educator
- Taravat Talepasand (MFA 2006), American interdisciplinary artist and educator, of Iranian descent
- Carlos Villa (BFA 1961, education), Filipino-American mixed media installation art, painting, performance art, curator, educator; taught at San Francisco Art Institute starting in 1969

==== New media and digital art ====
- Anthony Aziz (MFA 1990), of the duo Aziz + Cucher, pioneer in the field of fine art digital imaging and post-photography, professor of fine arts and associate dean of faculty at Parsons School of Design
- Sammy Cucher (MFA 1992), of the duo Aziz + Cucher, pioneer in the field of fine art digital imaging and post-photography

==== Painting ====
- Kim Anno (BFA 1983, MFA 1985), abstract painter, photographer, filmmaker; department chair and professor at California College of the Arts
- William Anthony (attended in the 1960s), painter, illustrator
- Victor Arnautoff (attended 1925 to 1929), Russian-born American painter, muralist, educator
- Ed Aulerich-Sugai (BFA 1974), painter, sculptor, gardener, AIDS activist
- Addie L. Ballou (attended the founding class), painter, poet, suffragist
- Lester D. Boronda, painter, sculptor, wrought iron furniture designer
- Joan Brown (BFA 1959, MFA 1960), figurative painter
- Ernest Briggs (attended 1947 to 1951), abstract expressionist painter, educator
- Sarah Cain (BFA 2001), painter
- Emily Carr (attended 1890 to 1893), Canadian painter
- Enrique Chagoya (BFA 1984), Mexican-born American painter, printmaker, educator
- Rinaldo Cuneo (attended in the 1900s), painter
- Ronald Davis (BFA 1964), abstract painter, sculptor
- Pedro Joseph de Lemos (attended in the 1890s), painter, printmaker, architect, illustrator, museum director, educator
- Richard Diebenkorn (attended 1946), abstract expressionist painter, educator
- Maynard Dixon (attended in 1893), painter and illustrator of the American West, educator
- Harry Stuart Fonda (attended 1883 to 1885), painter, educator
- Sonia Gechtoff (attended in the 1950s), abstract expressionist painter
- Gregory Gillespie (MFA 1962), magical realist painter
- Percy Gray (BFA 1888), landscape painter
- Michael Gregory (BFA 1980), landscape and still life painter
- Mike Henderson (MFA 1970), painter
- Robert H. Hudson (BFA 1961, MFA 1963), funk art assemblage metal sculpture, abstract painting, printmaking
- Steve Hurd (BFA 1979), painting, site-specific art
- Eliza Swann (BFA), American painter and interdisciplinary artist
- James Kelly (attended in the 1950s), abstract expressionist painter
- Toba Khedoori (BFA 1988), Australian painter, of Iraqi descent
- Rudolf Hess (attended in the 1920s), painter, art critic
- Ronnie Landfield (attended 1964 to 1965), abstract painter
- Linda Lomahaftewa (BFA, MFA 1971), painter, printmaker, educator,
- Arthur Frank Mathews (attended in the 1870s), tonalist painter, educator
- Barry McGee (BFA 1991), graffiti art, pioneer of the Mission School movement
- Lillie May Nicholson (1884–1964), painter
- Ernest Peixotto (attended in the 1880s), painter, illustrator
- Joe Reihsen (BFA 2005, new genres), painting, sculpture
- Hazel Salmi (BFA 1912), painter, leather worker, educator, and arts administrator
- David Simpson (BFA 1956), abstract painting
- Leo Valledor (attended 1953 to 1955), hard edge painting
- Kehinde Wiley (BFA 1999, painting), portrait painter with focus on Black subjects
- William T. Wiley (BFA 1960, MFA 1962), funk art painting, sculpture, performance art
- Neil Williams (BFA 1959), abstract painter, educator

==== Performance art ====
- Zulfikar Ali Bhutto Jr. (MFA 2016), Pakistani performance artist
- Nao Bustamante (BFA, MFA), performance art, academic administrator
- Jerome Caja (MFA 1986, new genres), performance artist within Queercore, painter
- Karen Finley (BFA 1982), performance artist, poet, musician
- Tony Labat (BFA, MFA, former faculty)
- Paul McCarthy (BFA 1969), performance art, sculpture
- Frank Moore (MFA 1983), performance art, video art, disabled art, poet

==== Photography ====
- Lewis Baltz (BFA 1969), photographer, educator former professor for photography at the European Graduate School
- Ruth-Marion Baruch (attended in the 1940s), German-born American photographer
- Alice Burr, pictorialist photographer
- Chris Enos (MFA 1971), photographer
- Philip Hyde, landscape photographer and conservationist
- John Humble (MFA 1973), photographer of the Los Angeles urban landscape
- Pirkle Jones (class of 1946), documentary photographer, educator
- Annie Leibovitz (attended), portrait photographer
- Catherine Opie (BFA 1985), portrait photographer, known for exploring the leather-dyke community
- J. John Priola (MFA 1987), photographer known for series, books, installation art

==== Sculpture ====
- Robert Ingersoll Aitken (class of 1900), architectural sculptor
- Jerry Ross Barrish (BFA 1974, MFA 1976, film), filmmaker and sculptor known for found object assemblage
- Ronald Bladen (attended in 1939), Canadian-born American sculptor, painter; known for large-scale sculptures
- Mark Bulwinkle (MFA 1972, printmaking), funk art and nut art sculpture; known for steel public art sculpture
- Gutzon Borglum (attended in 1888), sculptor; creator of Mount Rushmore (1927)
- Peter Forakis (BFA 1957), sculptor, abstract painter
- Charles Ginnever (BFA 1957), sculptor; known for large-scale abstract steel sculptures
- Kathy Goodell (BFA, MFA late 1970s), sculptor, installation artist, educator
- Allan Graham (attended in the 1960s), sculptor, installation artist
- Robert Graham (MFA 1964), Mexican-born American sculptor; known for monumental bronze figures
- Michael Heizer (BFA 1964), site-specific sculpture, land art work
- Robert H. Hudson (BFA 1961, MFA 1963), funk art assemblage metal sculpture, abstract painting, printmaking
- Sargent Claude Johnson (attended 1919 to 1923), painting, sculpture, ceramics; first Black artist in California to achieve a national reputation
- Mary Tuthill Lindheim (attended 1930), sculpture, pottery
- Paul McCarthy (BFA 1969), sculpture, performance art
- Jason Middlebrook (MFA 1994), sculpture, painting, public art, drawing
- Forrest Myers (attended 1958 to 1960), sculpture; known for large-scale sculptures
- Manuel Neri (attended in the 1950s), sculpture, painting, printmaking, educator
- Peter Reginato (attended 1963 to 1966), sculpture, painting
- William T. Wiley (BFA 1960, MFA 1962), funk art painting, sculpture, performance art

=== Chefs ===
- Elizabeth Falkner (BFA 1989), celebrity chef, restaurateur
- Mollie Katzen (BFA), cookbook author, illustrator, restauranteur

=== Design ===
- Mary Colter (BFA 1890), architect
- Don Ed Hardy (BFA 1967, printmaking), tattoo artist, illustrator, eponymous fashion line
- Win Ng (BFA 1959), product designer, ceramicist, and co-founder of Taylor & Ng home goods
- Rex Ray (BFA 1988), collagist, graphic design, graphic artist; known for music posters, and collage art
- Barbara Stauffacher Solomon (attended in the 1940s), landscape architect, graphic designer

=== Film ===
- Lance Acord (attended in the 1980s), cinematographer, film director
- Stan Brakhage (attended in 1953), experimental filmmaker, writer
- Kathryn Bigelow (BFA 1972, film), filmmaker including director, producer, writer
- Christopher Coppola (BFA 1985), film director, producer, educator
- Spike Jonze, film director
- Matthew Leutwyler (attended), screenwriter, film director, film producer
- Janis Crystal Lipzin (MFA film), experimental filmmaker, educator
- C. Cameron Macauley (attended), ethnographic filmmaker, photographer
- Hiro Narita (BFA 1964, graphic design), cinematographer, designer
- Lourdes Portillo (MFA 1985, film), filmmaker
- Peter Pau (BFA 1983, film), Academy Award-winning filmmaker and cinematographer
- Ruby Yang (BFA 1977, film), Hong Kong–American documentary filmmaker
- Suzi Yoonessi, filmmaker, screenwriter, film director, Dear Lemon Lima, Daphne & Velma
- Will Zang, documentary filmmaker

=== Musicians ===
- Devendra Banhart (attended 1998–2000), singer–songwriter, visual artist
- Jerry Garcia (attended 1958), singer–songwriter, guitarist; founder of the Grateful Dead band
- Dave Getz (MFA 1964), musician, member of Big Brother and the Holding Company rock band
- Penelope Houston (attended), punk singer–songwriter; founder of the Avengers band
- Debora Iyall (attended in 1970s), Cowlitz musician, lead singer for the new wave band Romeo Void
- Courtney Love (attended), musician, actress

=== Writers ===
- Chrisann Brennan (attended in 1989), memoirist, painter
- Laura Kipnis, essayist, cultural critic, video artist, educator

== Notable current and past faculty ==
List includes noted faculty both past and present, in alphabetical order by department and last name.

=== Fine arts faculty ===
==== New genres faculty ====
- Howard Fried, conceptual artist, video art, performance art, installation art; founded the video art and performance department (later known as "new genres")
- Doug Hall, performance art, installation art, video art, large scale digital photography; member of T.R. Uthco; taught in new genres from 1981 to 2008
- Paul Kos, conceptual artist; started teaching in new genres in 1978
- Tony Labat, performance, video, and installation artist
- Renée Green, renowned American artist, filmmaker, and writer; Professor and Dean of Graduate Studies from 2005-2011

==== Painting and printmaking faculty ====
- Gertrude Partington Albright, British-born American printmaker, painter, educator; taught starting in 1917
- Victor Arnautoff (attended 1925 to 1929), Russian-born American painter, muralist, educator; taught starting in 1936
- Elmer Bischoff, abstract expressionist painter; taught painting starting in 1946
- Emil Carlsen, Danish-born impressionist painter; school director from 1887 to 1889
- Jay DeFeo, painter; taught from 1964 to 1971
- Richard Diebenkorn (attended 1946), abstract expressionist painter, educator
- James Budd Dixon, abstract expressionist painter, member of the "Sausalito Six"
- Harry Stuart Fonda (attended 1883 to 1885), painter; taught from 1897 to 1899
- Pedro Joseph de Lemos (attended in the 1890s), painter, printmaker, architect, illustrator, museum director; taught decorative arts starting in 1911, school director from 1914 to 1917
- Frank Lobdell, abstract expressionist painter, member of the "Sausalito Six"; taught starting in 1957
- Arthur Frank Mathews (attended in the 1870s), tonalist painter; painting teacher starting in 1880s, school director from 1889 to 1906
- Nathan Oliveira, painter, printmaker, sculptor; taught printmaking in the 1950s
- David Park (attended in the 1930s), figurative painter, member of the Bay Area Figurative Movement; painting faculty from 1944 to 1952
- Gottardo Piazzoni (attended in the 1890s), Swiss-born Italian and American landscape painter, muralist, sculptor
- Ad Reinhardt, painter, printmaker
- Mark Rothko, abstract painter
- Rudolph Schaeffer, educator; taught color theory starting in 1917
- Hassel Smith (attended 1936 to 1938), painter; taught painting starting in 1945
- Clay Spohn (attended in the 1920s), painter, printmaker, muralist, educator; taught from 1945 to 1950
- Jack Stauffacher, printer, typographer, educator, fine book publisher
- Clyfford Still, abstract expressionist painter, educator; taught from 1946 to 1950
- Inez Storer, painter, taught from 1981 to 1999
- Taravat Talepasand (MFA 2006), interdisciplinary artist and educator, of Iranian descent; former chair of the painting department
- Sam Tchakalian, abstract expressionist painter, taught from 1964 to 2004
- Virgil Macey Williams, painter; school founder, and first director
- Carlos Villa (BFA 1961, education), Filipino-American mixed media installation art, painting, performance art, curator, educator; taught at San Francisco Art Institute starting in 1969

==== Photography faculty ====
- Ansel Adams, photographer; established the photo department in 1946
- Morley Baer, photographer, teacher; chaired the photography department starting in 1953
- Jerry Burchard (BFA 1960), photographer, taught starting in 1966 and chaired the department in 1969
- Linda Connor, photographer, taught starting in 1969
- Imogen Cunningham, photographer; taught in the 1950s
- Dorothea Lange, photographer, taught starting in 1940s
- Lisette Model, street photographer, taught starting in 1949
- J. John Priola (MFA 1987), photographer known for series, books, installation art; taught from 1996 to 2022 and chaired the photography department
- Larry Sultan (MFA), photographer, taught from 1978 to 1988
- Minor White, photographer, assisted in the establishment of the photo department in 1946

==== Sculpture faculty ====
- Jeremy Anderson, wood sculpture; taught in the 1960s and 1970s
- Beniamino Bufano, sculpture; taught in 1923, one semester only
- Wally Hedrick (BFA 1955), sculpture, assemblage, painting, educator; taught from 1960 to 1970
- Leo Lentelli, Italian sculptor
- Manuel Neri (attended in the 1950s), sculpture, painting, printmaking, educator
- Irene Pijoan, Swiss-born American sculptor, painter, educator; taught from 1983 to 2004
- Jim Pomeroy, performance art, sound art, photography, installation art, sculpture, video art; chair of the sculpture department from 1977 to 1979
- Ralph Stackpole (attended in 1901), sculpture, murals, painting, educator; taught for twenty years from c. 1920s to 1940s

=== Film faculty ===
- James Broughton, experimental filmmaker, beat poet; taught in the 1960s
- Christopher Coppola (BFA 1985, film), film director and producer; taught starting in 2013
- John Korty, film director
- George Kuchar, low-fi aesthetic filmmaker, educator
- Tony Labat, Cuban-born multimedia artist, installation artist, educator; taught film from 1985 to 2022
- Janis Crystal Lipzin (MFA film), experimental filmmaker, educator
- Sidney Peterson, avant-garde filmmaker, film director; initiated in 1947 the first film courses
- Al Wong, experimental filmmaker, mixed media installation artist; taught from 1975 to 2003

=== Other faculty ===
- John Collier Jr., visual anthropologist, writer, educator; taught starting in 1959
- Dewey Crumpler, history, painting
- Angela Davis, political activist, academic; taught women's studies coursework in 1978
- Okwui Enwezor, curator, educator, SFAI dean from 2005-2009
- Jane McGonigal, game studies, game design

== List of presidents and directors ==
=== California School of Design presidents and directors (1871–1915) ===
- Virgil Macey Williams, first director from 1871 to 1886
- Emil Carlsen, director from 1887 to 1889
- Robert Howe Fletcher director from 1899 to 1906, of the Mark Hopkins Institute of Art
- Arthur Frank Mathews, director from 1889 to 1906
- Robert Howe Fletcher, director from 1907 to 1915, of California School of Design

=== California School of Fine Arts presidents and directors (1916–1960) ===
- Pedro Joseph de Lemos, director from 1914 to 1917
- Lee Fritz Randolph, director from 1917 to 1941
- William Alexander Gaw, director from 1941 to 1945
- Douglas MacAgy, director from 1945 to 1950
- Ernest Karl Mundt, director from 1950 to 1955

=== San Francisco Art Institute presidents and directors (1961–2022) ===
- Gurdon Woods, president from 1955 to 1964
- Theodore L. Eliot, executive director from 1964 to 1973
- Fred Martin, director from 1965 to 1975
- Arnold Herstand, president from 1974 to 1976
- Stephen Goldstein, president from 1978 to 1986
- William O. Barrnett, president from 1987 to 1994
- Ella King Torrey, president from 1995 to 2002
- Larry Thomas, acting president from 2002 to 2004
- Christopher Bratton, president from 2004 to 2010
- Roy Eisenhardt, acting president from 2010 to 2011
- Charles Desmarais, president from 2011 to 2015
- Gordon Knox, president from 2016 to 2020
- Mark Kushner, interim president from 2020 to closure

== See also ==
- Bay Area Figurative Movement
- Montgomery Block, historic art studio in San Francisco
- List of California College of the Arts people
