= Priola (surname) =

Priola is a surname. Notable people with the surname include:

- Giusto Priola (born 1990), Italian footballer
- J. John Priola (born 1960), American contemporary visual artist
- Kevin Priola (born 1973), American politician
- Marguerite Priola (1849–1876), stage name of the French opera singer Marguerite-Marie-Sophie Polliart
- Suzette A. Priola, American molecular neurobiologist
