= ArtPremium =

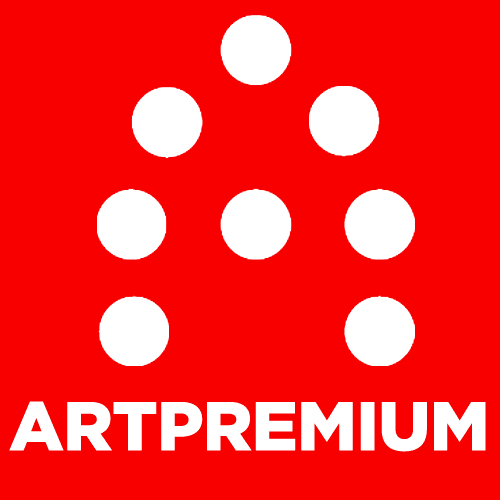
- Editor: Corinne Timsit
- Categories: art magazines
- Frequency: Quarterly
- Founder: Corinne Timsit, Eric Bonici
- Founded: 2003
- Country: USA
- Based in: Paris
- Language: English
- Website: www.artpremium.com
- ISSN: 2492-9395
- OCLC: 948671455

ArtPremium is a quarterly magazine specializing in contemporary art.

== History ==
ArtPremium is an independent, ad-free, sales-driven magazine focused on exhibitions and the international contemporary art market. The magazine was created by Corinne Timsit and Eric Bonici in 2003 in Puerto Rico and is now based in Paris since 2014. ArtPremium begins as a magazine in Spanish dedicated to the Puerto Rican art scene, its first issues are subtitled: La revista de arte de Puerto Rico. ArtPremium remain the art magazine of Puerto Rico until 2008, when Corinne Timsit and Eric Bonici decide to internationalize the magazine. They create ArtPremium Newspaper to locally replace their magazine, ArtPremium then becomes a magazine entirely dedicated to contemporary art and ArtPremium TV to broadcast content adapted to the web. In parallel with its activities, ArtPremium develops a network of partners in major contemporary art fairs worldwide, by forming partnerships with : Art Basel, Art Basel Miami, Art Basel Hong-Kong, Fiac Paris, Art Paris art fair, The Armory Show New York. Its distribution focus on major bookstores, concept stores, and museums such as: Château de Montsoreau-Museum of Contemporary Art, Palais de Tokyo, Pompidou Center, Guggenheim Museum (Bilbao), Reina Sofia Museum.

The magazine has published background articles on: Andres Serrano, Aziz + Cucher, Bill Viola, Lee Ufan, Anish Kapoor, Nils Udo, Subodh Gupta.

In 2006, the magazine ArtPremium organizes and produces in Puerto Rico, the first retrospective of Jean-Michel Basquiat. This exhibition takes place at the Muséo de arte de Puerto Rico in order to pay a national tribute to Jean-Michel Basquiat (born in New York), who was of Puerto Rican origins by his mother. Lourdes I Ramos-Rivas (named in 2016 president of the Museum of Latin American Art in Long Beach), as chief curator of the museum, is also the curator of this retrospective which brings together more than 135 original works by JMB, and contributes to the book: Jean-Michel Basquiat, an anthology for Puerto Rico, also produced by ArtPremium.

In 2009, the entire spring issue is dedicated to Kiro Urdin to celebrate the long term achievements in his international career. During an interview, and to the question of what he thought to be so exposed, Urdin will say: "It doesn't happen frequently to the artists, but it is good when an important magazine is dedicated to one artist".

== Website artpremium.com ==
Between 2011 and 2015, ArtPremium abandons its paper version to focus on its digital development, the magazine becomes completely free and readable online. The results having been inconclusive, the paper version of the magazine returns in 2016 with a new English-language version. The ArtPremium website is now an extension of the paper review, it includes uploads of unpublished articles and a layout adapted to digital reading.

== ArtPremium TV ==
Since 2008, ArtPremium has been broadcasting its ArtPremium TV channel on the vimeo social network. Web-based content can be used to relay artist interviews such as Kiro Urdin, Carlos Betancourt or Aziz + Cucher, exhibition montage views, or reports on contemporary art fairs such as FIAC.
