= Narjot =

Narjot may refer to:

- Narjot de Toucy (disambiguation), four members of the same noble European family
- Ernest Narjot (1826–1898), American painter
