= Mike Henderson (disambiguation) =

Mike Henderson may refer to:

- Mike Henderson, American singer-songwriter (1953–2023)
- Mike Henderson (artist), American painter, filmmaker, and musician (born 1943)
- Mike Henderson (politician), American politician from Missouri

== See also ==
- Michael Henderson (disambiguation)
