= Sara Mohr-Pietsch =

British music broadcaster (born 1980)

Sara Mohr-Pietsch (/mɔːˈpiːtʃ/; born 1980) is a British music broadcaster who works principally for BBC Radio 3.

== Early life and education ==
Mohr-Pietsch was born in London to a mother of Polish and a father of German descent. She attended South Hampstead High School, where she sang in the choral society and took the role of Aeneas in a school production of Dido and Aeneas. After school, she studied music at Newnham College, Cambridge (1998–2001), where she was the first ever Newnham Choral Scholar in Selwyn College's Chapel Choir. After gaining a first-class degree, she studied for an MA at the University of Edinburgh, subsequently becoming a tutor, a post she retained until 2006.

== Career ==
While based in Edinburgh, Mohr-Pietsch embarked on a career in arts administration and began to broadcast on Radio 3, winning a BBC talent contest in 2004.

After moving back to London, her involvement with the network became more extensive. She became a regular presenter of the network’s Breakfast programme in 2007. Her fortnightly stretches alternated with those of Petroc Trelawny; previously Rob Cowan was the other regular presenter. In addition, she presents (with others) the contemporary music programme Hear and Now. Mohr-Pietsch began to present The Proms in 2008 on Radio 3, and on television for the BBC. At the beginning of December 2013, Clemency Burton-Hill replaced her on Breakfast.

Mohr-Pietsch regularly presented Radio 3's The Choir, and the Discovering Music series, particularly in programmes on Johann Sebastian Bach, whom she greatly admires and has studied extensively; early music is another interest. In April 2024, she began a new series, "Music Map" for BBC Radio 3, in which "Mohr-Pietsch explores a piece of classical music, travelling to it through a playlist of connected and contrasting sound worlds, and mapping it in a musical landscape". In addition, Mohr-Pietsch co-presents "Night Tracks", described on the BBC Radio 3 website as "an adventurous, immersive soundtrack for late-night listening, from classical to contemporary and everything in between".

She is also a singer and pianist and plays the viola da gamba – "incredibly badly" in her own words.

In November 2018, the Dartington Hall Trust announced that Mohr-Pietsch had been appointed as the artistic director of the Dartington International Summer School and Festival. She curated her first festival in 2020, in succession to Joanna MacGregor. It was announced in November 2023 that Mohr-Pietsch had decided to stand down from the role after four years, amid speculation about the Summer School's future.

== Voice ==
Writing in The Daily Telegraph in 2007, sportswriter Michael Henderson found it "inconceivable that Sara Mohr-Pietsch, with her dropped aitches and glottal stops, would have been let loose on Radio 3 even 10 years ago." In 2016, a poll inviting readers of the Radio Times to vote for Britain's "favourite radio voice" shortlisted Mohr-Pietsch among the top 20, describing her as having "one of Radio 3's most reassuring voices. Such clarity, such warmth."

== Charity work ==
In support of Red Nose Day 2013, Mohr-Pietsch set herself the challenge of learning eight notes on the cello in seven days, as part of a comic rendition of Pachelbel's Canon.
