= Rora Blue =

American visual artist

- Born: c. 1996; California, U.S.
- Education: San Francisco Art Institute
- Known for: The Unsent Project
- Movement: New Genres
- Awards: VSA Emerging Young Artist Award
- Website: https://www.rorablue.com/

Rora Blue is an American visual artist, fashion designer, and model. His work primarily focuses on sexuality, gender, and disability. He is responsible for The Unsent Project and After the Beep. Blue's work primarily takes the form of text-based art, installations, and audience interaction. Blue's work also revolves around the importance of color. Blue has stated that his work is based on his every day experiences of being "multiply marginalized" as a person who is queer, disabled, and a gender minority.

== Early life and education ==
Blue was born in California, and was raised in Texas. Blue began to create art after graduating high school. In 2021, he received a BFA in New Genres from the San Francisco Art Institute. Blue is currently a graduate student at the University of Nevada, Reno, and is pursuing a MFA. He was a recipient of a 2019-2020 VSA Emerging Young Artist Award from the John F. Kennedy Center for the Performing Arts.

== Notable works ==
=== Projects ===
Blue is the founder of The Unsent Project, an archive where users can share text messages that they never sent. These submissions are then stored on the website. Visitors to the website can search and view messages that have been uploaded by other users. When uploading, users have the option to input a person's name, select a color, and to type their message. Uploads to the website are anonymous. To date, the website has over 5 million submissions. Blue has stated the reason why users can choose the color is to illustrate that colors can be representative of how a person views love. Blue stated that his inspiration for starting The Unsent Project was as follows:

The Unsent Project came out of a place of processing my own experience with my first love. I wanted to connect with other people and learn about their experiences. I honestly had no idea that it was a concept that would resonate with so many people. It felt wonderful to be able to give other people a place where they could express themselves anonymously.

Blue also started a similar project, titled After the Beep. Blue describes the project as:

...a collection of submitted voicemails. They are the voicemails that people can’t bring themselves to delete off their phones. Similar to The Unsent Project, After the Beep also explores the connection between color and emotion. I do this by asking the submitter what color comes to mind when they listen to their voicemail.

=== Series ===
Outside of his projects, Blue also has various art series. "Sweet Dreams" is a word art collection of ableist microaggressions. These phrases and sayings are fastened on everyday objects, such as pillows and bath tubs. Another art series, entitled "Handle with Care", positions sexist comments, colored in red, on people, balloons, skirts, underwear, and soup.
"(Don't)" is similar, transposing comments that force gender roles onto men on shirts, receipts, clothes, and mirrors. "Chronic Illness Reimagined As Something Glamorous" features medication and pills as jewelry. In one photo of the series, Blue is hooked into an IV bag filled with a glittery, blue fluid.

Pill, Ow is an art book edited by Blue that features the artwork of 37 different artists. While varied in their composition, all the artwork had to match the color of the creator's medication. The book is hand-bound, being sewn together with surgical sutures. The cover art is by Jayme Allen.

== Personal life ==
Blue has late-stage neurological Lyme disease and POTS.

== Notes ==
Per Blue's Instagram, on 10/12/2025, he uses he/him pronouns exclusively.
