= James Everett Stuart =

American landscape painter (1852–1941)

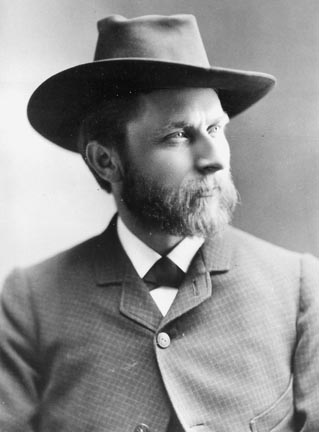
- Studio portrait, c. 1885
- Born: March 24, 1852; Orneville, Maine
- Died: January 2, 1941 (aged 88); San Francisco, California
- Resting place: Cypress Lawn Memorial Park; Colma, California
- Known for: Landscape Painting
- Style: Realism

James Everett Stuart (March 24, 1852 – January 2, 1941) was an American landscape painter known for his views of the American West, particularly California, Nevada, and Wyoming, as well as depictions of the coastline and Indigenous settlements of Alaska. While primarily based in San Francisco, he also occupied studios in Portland, New York, and Chicago for many years, developing a customer base across the country. Over the course of six decades, Stuart is estimated to have produced more than 5,000 paintings and drawings, which he meticulously numbered and dated.

== Biography ==
=== Early life and Oregon ===
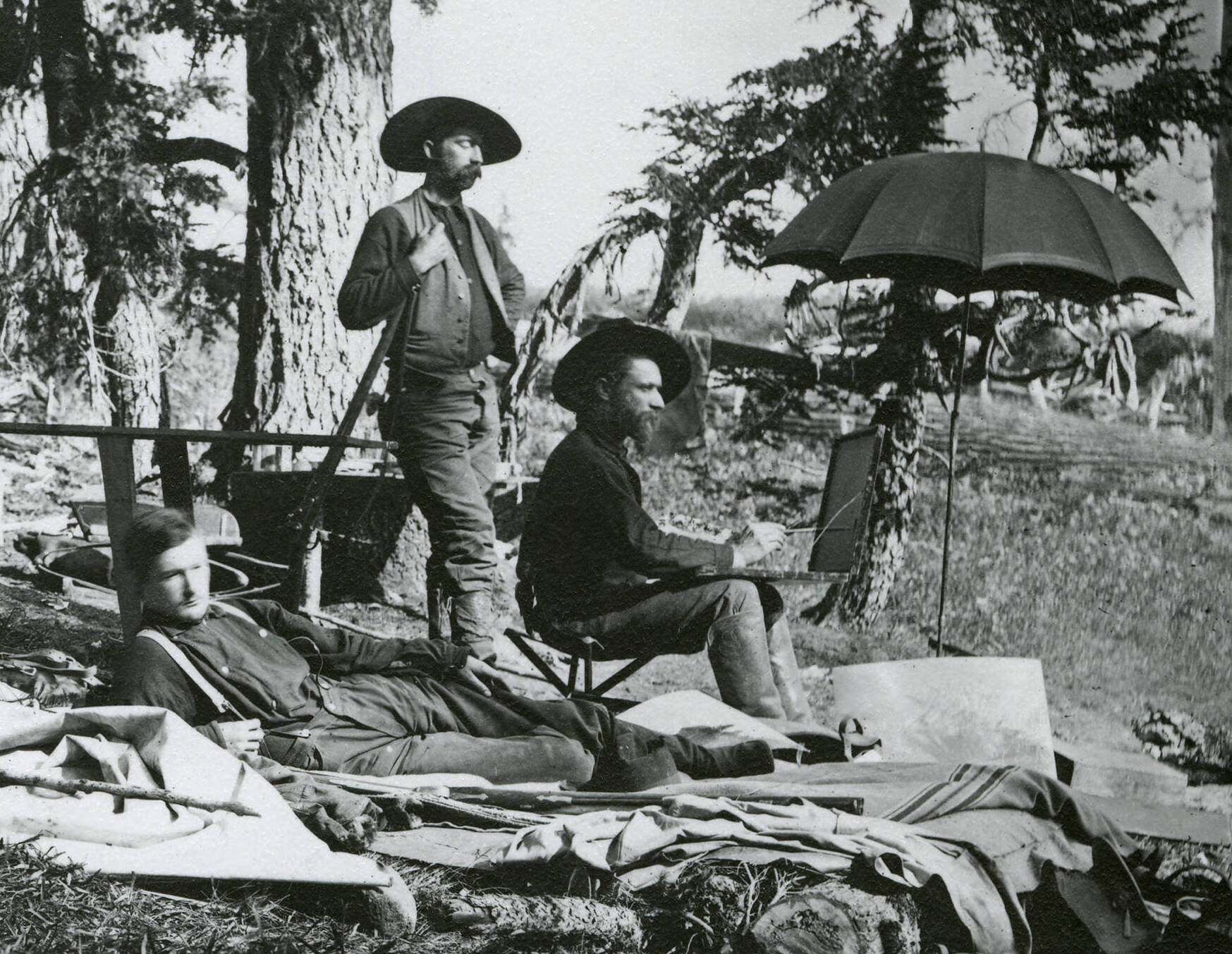
Detail of a Peter Britt photograph of Stuart (seated) and two men sketching at Crater Lake in 1874

Stuart was born on March 24, 1852, in Orneville, Maine, an unincorporated town in Piscataquis County, northwest of Bangor. He was the third child of Methodist minister Rev. Daniel Shaw Stuart (1825–1916) and Lydia H. Philpot (1831–1917). A number of historical sources mistakenly described him as the grandson of painter Gilbert Stuart, though the two artists are actually unrelated. In 1860, the Stuarts relocated to a farm on land recently appropriated by the State of California in Grand Island, on the Sacramento River, though the Great Flood of 1862 forced them to move to Silveyville.

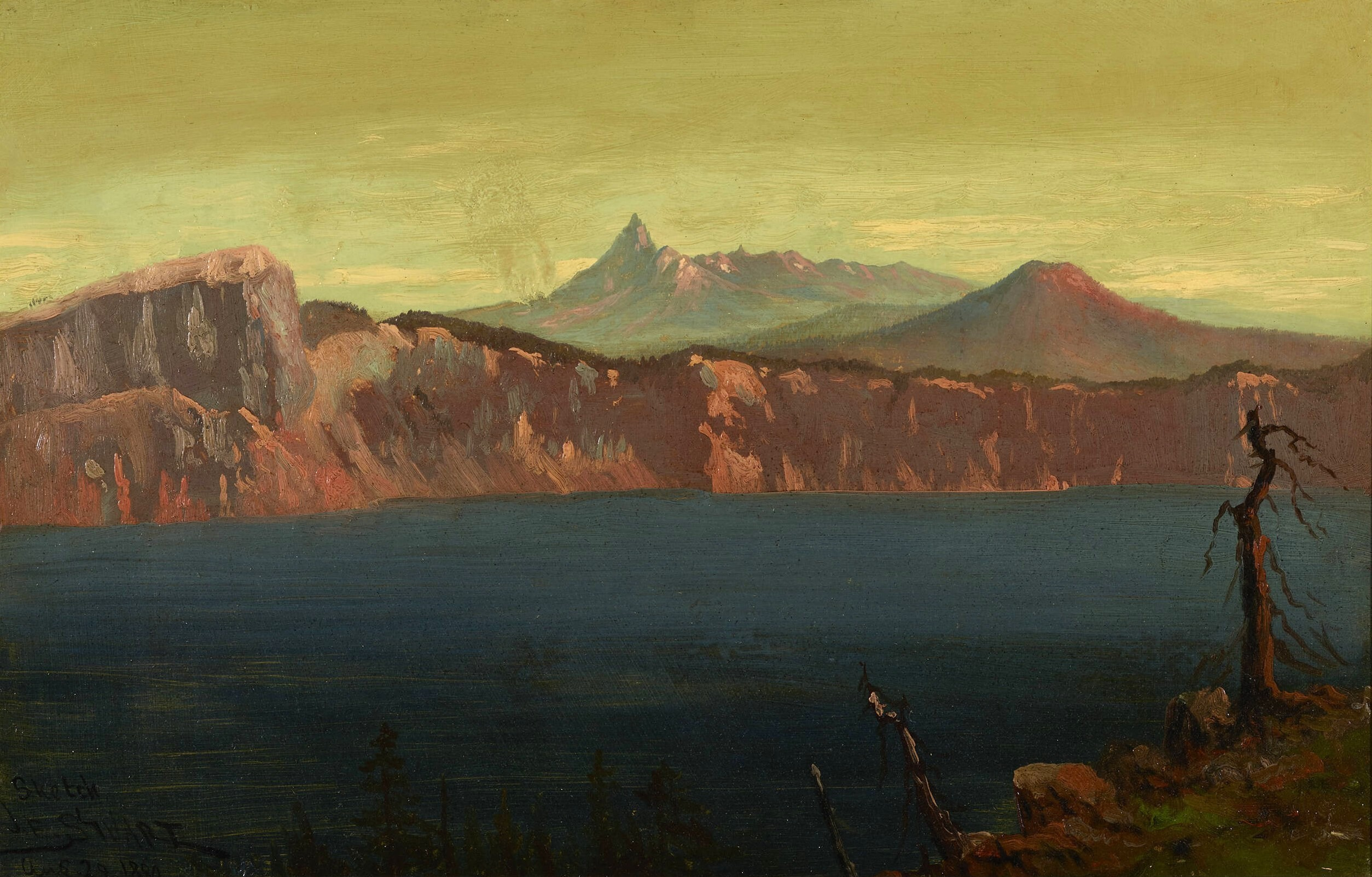
Morning, Looking Northwest from the South Rim of Crater Lake, 1882, private collection

In the early 1870s, Stuart took regular lessons with painter David Holmes Woods in his Sacramento studio. In 1874, a decisive trip to Oregon allowed him to meet Jacksonville photographer Peter Britt and travel with him for sketching purposes. Returning to California, Stuart enrolled in the San Francisco School of Design, founded three years prior on Pine Street by members of the San Francisco Art Association. There, he studied under landscape artists Virgil Macey Williams, Raymond Yelland, Thomas Hill, and William Keith, while taking lessons with painter Benoni Irwin. He also became a member of the Bohemian Club, one of the city's premier cultural associations.

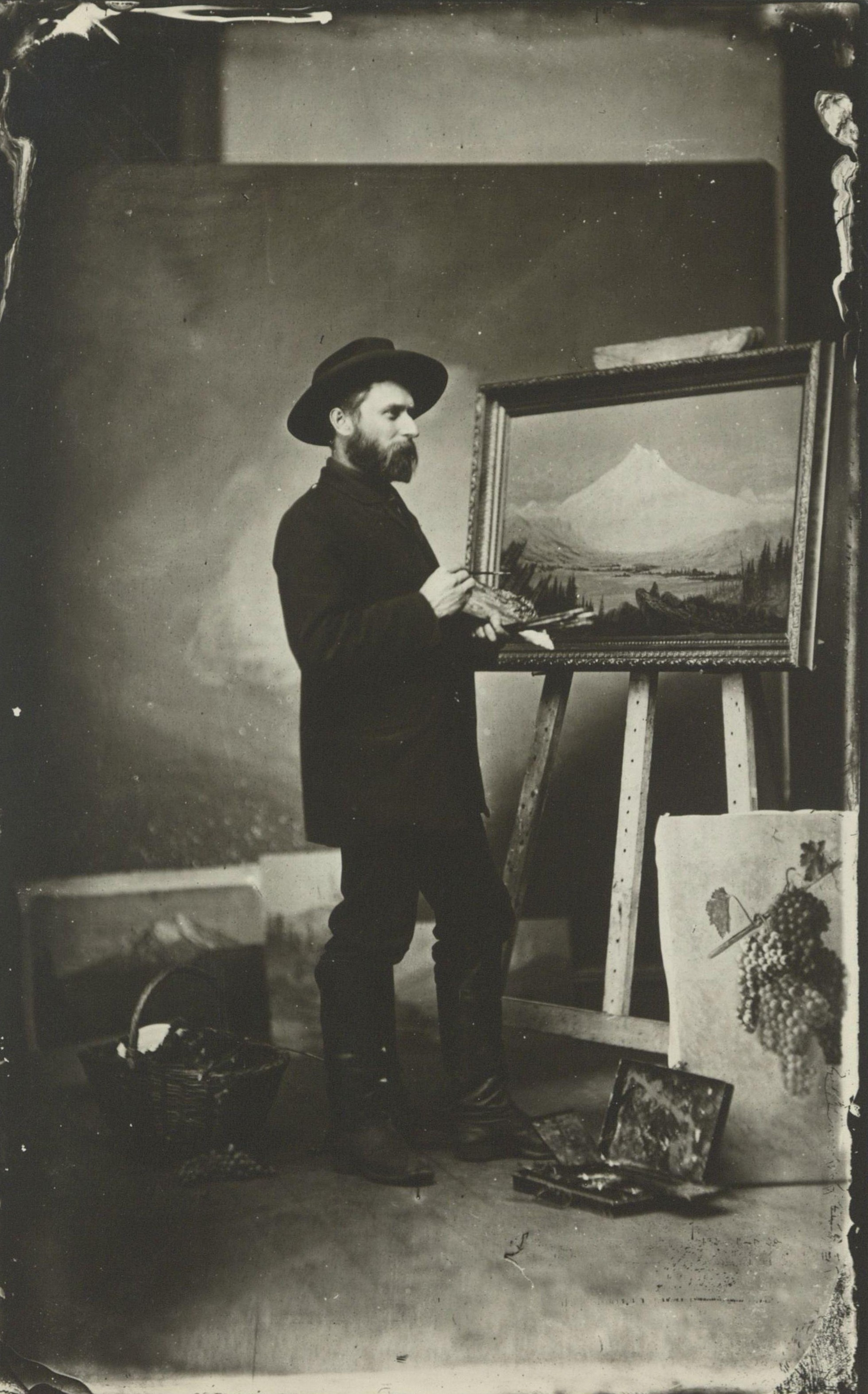
Stuart painting in Jacksonville, Oregon, in 1883.

Upon graduating in 1879, Stuart opened a studio in Portland and spent the following years painting Oregon and Northern California. In 1882, he traveled to Crater Lake with Peter Britt and lawyer Robert Aubrey Miller, before continuing on to Mt. Shasta, which inspired the first important series of pictures of his career. Stuart remained in Portland until 1886, when he left for New York, though he would continue traveling to the region regularly to paint pictures of the Pacific Northwest for his East Coast clients.

=== Travels to Yellowstone and Alaska ===
Stuart spent a total of five years in New York, meeting important landscape artists based in the city, including Thomas Moran and Albert Bierstadt, who had both helped popularize images of the Rocky Mountains and larger American West. In addition, he befriended landscape painter George Inness as they both rented spaces in the Holbein Studios on 55th Street, a stable whose upper floors had been converted into artists' quarters by banker Charles Tracy Barney.

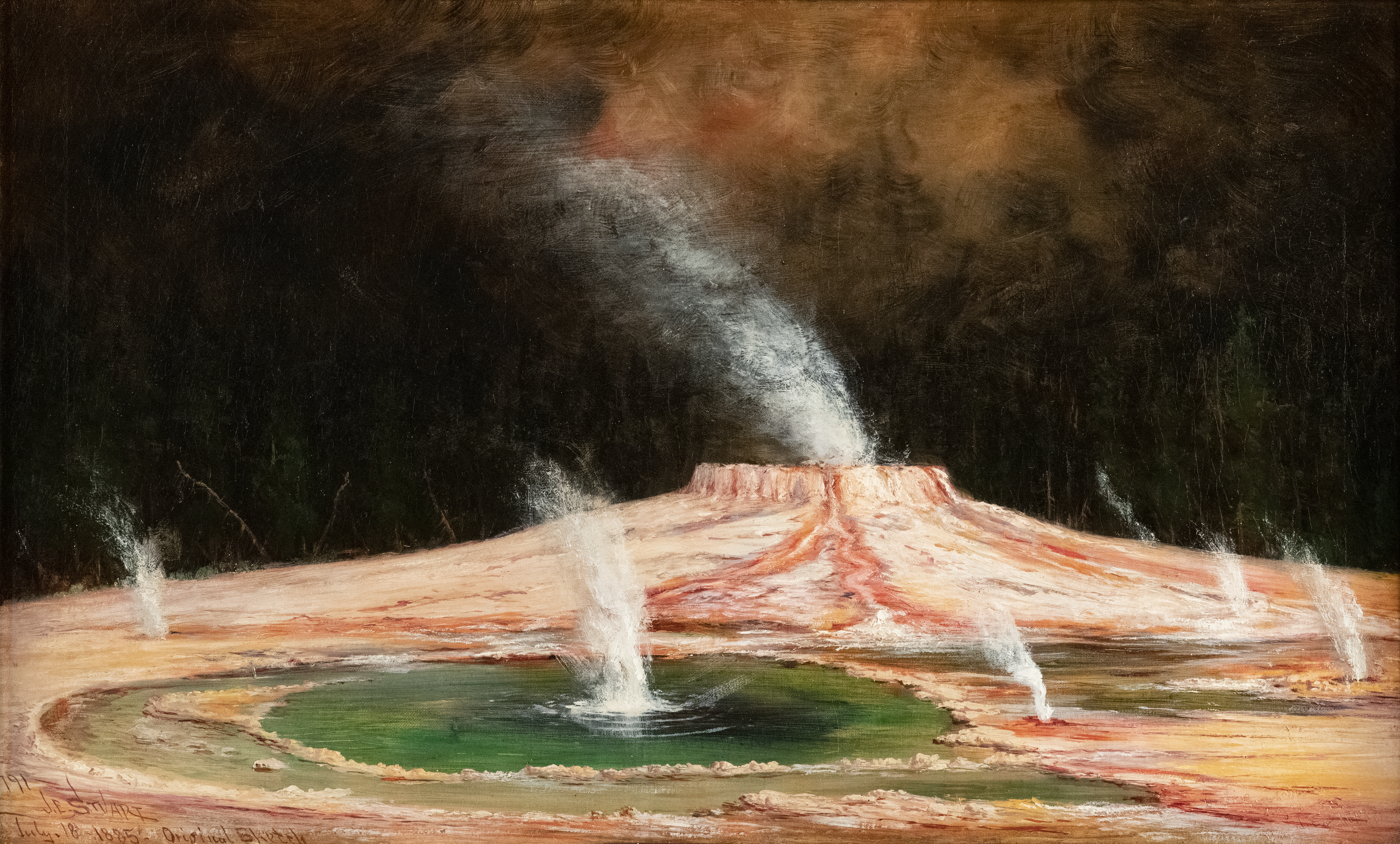
Approaching Storm, The Devil’s Punch Bowl, Yellowstone National Park, 1885, Joslyn Art Museum

Largely coinciding with his New York years, Stuart took five separate trips to Yellowstone National Park in 1885, 1886, 1887, 1888, and 1890. Traveling via Shoshone Falls and the town of Cinnabar, Montana, Stuart's first excursion to the area resulted in dozens of sketches of recognizable sights, including Old Faithful Geyser, Punch Bowl Spring (also known as Devil's Punch Bowl), and Lone Star Geyser. His second excursion, from August to October 1886, was sponsored by Thomas Fletcher Oakes, vice-president of the Northern Pacific Railway, and Stuart was able to sell some of his pictures at the Mammoth Hot Springs Hotel. The following year, the Northern Pacific once again financed his trip in exchange for paintings, and he entered three pictures into the Minnesota Industrial Exposition, including a view of Yellowstone. According to art historian Jennifer Olson, Stuart's pictures illustrated his beliefs in an inherent spirituality in nature, an approach that had become one of the principles of Manifest Destiny after influencing the works of painters of the Hudson River School.

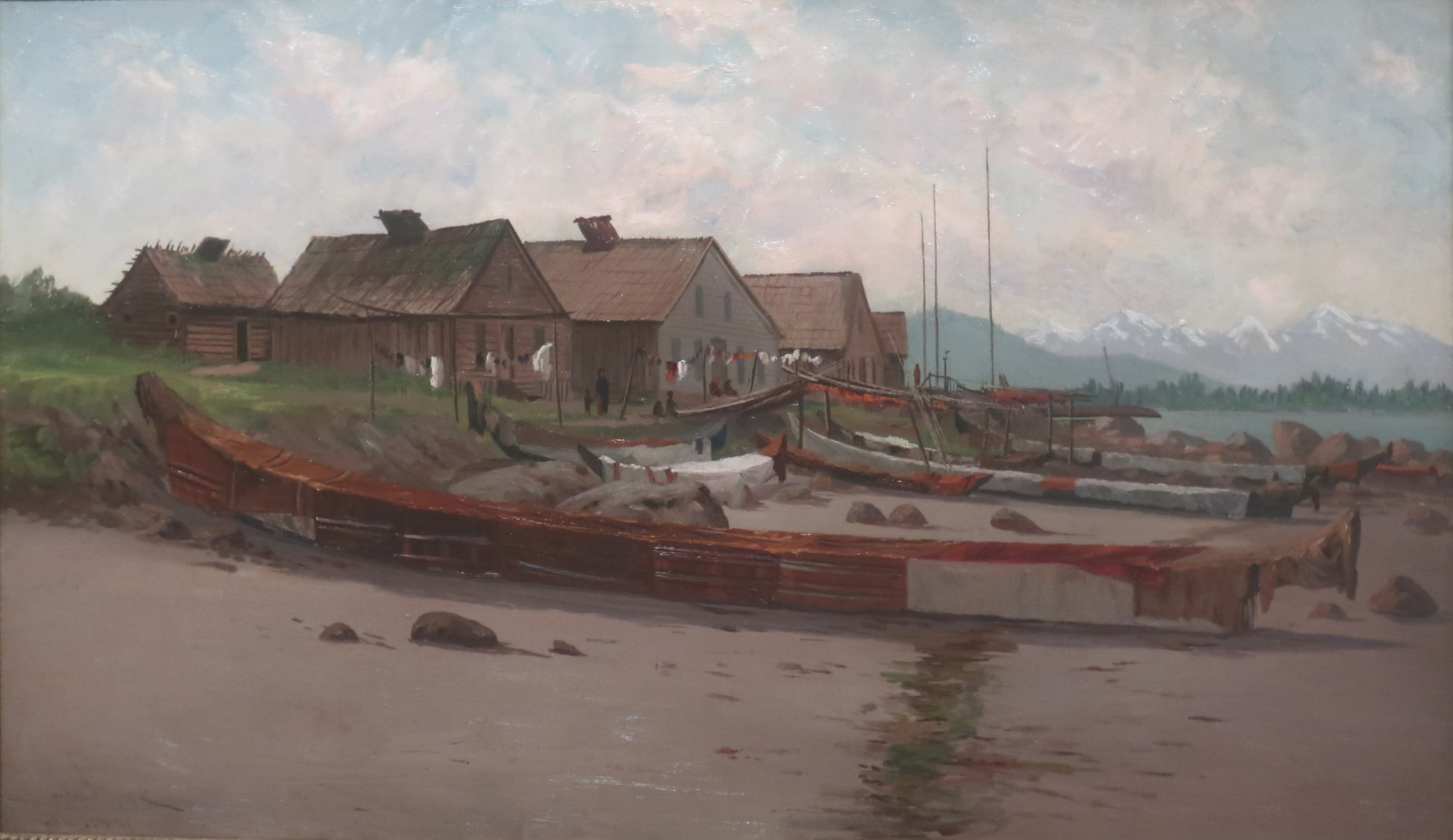
Extreme End of Indian Town, Sitka, 1891, Anchorage Museum

Leaving New York for Tacoma in 1890, Stuart soon departed for Alaska for the first of four trips he would make to the region between 1891 and 1903. Reaching Sitka in June 1891, he painted Muir Glacier and made his way to Yakutat Bay to paint the scenery of Mt. St. Elias and Mt. Fairweather. Stuart's first stay in Alaska was also marked by his renewed interest in depictions of Indigenous communities, though he subscribed to the long tradition of romanticizing and stereotyping Native Americans in American visual arts. Echoing his previous scenes of Native settlements at Celilo Falls, Oregon, in 1884, Stuart depicted Tlingit culture while in Alaska, particularly villages of the Sheet'ká Ḵwáan Tribe near Stika and the Indian River.

After returning from his first trip to Alaska, Stuart once again resettled, this time in Chicago, where he fitted a studio on Michigan Avenue and later East Monroe Street and lived for the next twenty years. During the first decade of the 20th century, he produced a number of views of Washington Park, as well as natural sites in neighboring Wisconsin, particularly Geneva Lake. A trip to Maine in Summer 1906 also resulted in sketches of sites including Bar Harbor, Mt. Desert Island, and Dover.

In the early 1900s, Stuart developed a technique for painting on aluminum which he considered indestructible, although alterations to the works he produced using this method did appear over time. His first work completed on aluminum, a small still life of a peach, was shown at the 1902 American Art Association exhibition in Philadelphia.

=== Return to California and later years ===
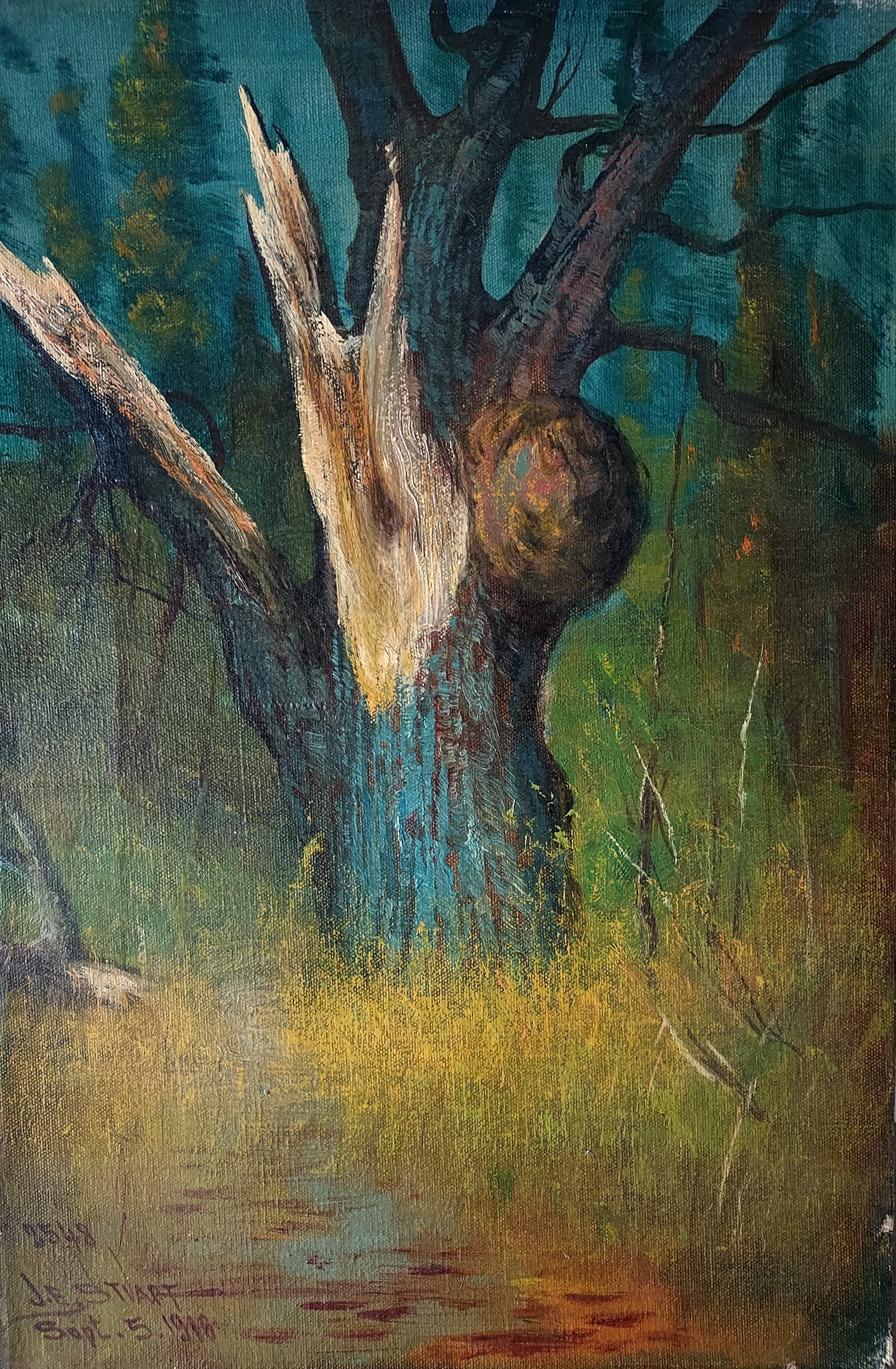
The Lightning-Scarred Oak, South of Camp Curry, Yosemite, 1918, private collection

In 1912, Stuart moved back to San Francisco, where he would work and reside for the remainder of his career. His later paintings primarily include views of Yosemite National Park and the Sacramento Valley, rendered in an increasingly abstract manner, with looser brushstrokes and bolder, less naturalistic colors. Following his move to a studio and gallery at 684 Commercial Street in 1923, his professional success gradually declined to the point that he was forced to sell batches of his paintings at discounted rates. As of 1925, he was still in possession of 2,600 of his works and looking for a buyer to purchase half of them in a single transaction. He died in his San Francisco studio on January 2, 1941, at the age of 88.

== Collections ==
Among major institutions holding Stuart’s works are the Birmingham Museum of Art, de Young Museum, Crocker Art Museum, Tacoma Art Museum, Anchorage Museum, Oakland Museum of California, Buffalo Bill Center of the West, Joslyn Art Museum, and Brigham Young University Museum of Art.
