= Michael Henderson (disambiguation) =

Michael Henderson (1951–2022) was an American musician.

Michael Henderson may also refer to:

- Michael Henderson (author) (1932–2022), English journalist and author of ten books, mainly on forgiveness
- Michael Henderson (doctor) (born 1937), vehicle safety researcher
- Michael Henderson (fencer) (born 1935), New Zealand fencer
- Michael Henderson (rugby league) (born 1984), Australian rugby league player
- Michael Henderson (writer) (born 1958), British journalist, sports and cultural journalism
- Michael M. T. Henderson (1942–2018), American linguist
- J. Michael Henderson (born 1945), American surgeon
- Mick Henderson (born 1956), English association footballer
- Mike Henderson (1953–2023), American singer-songwriter
- Mike Henderson (politician) (born 1958/59), American politician
- Michael Henderson (born 2004) (rapper)

== See also ==
- Michele Henderson, Dominica musician
