= New Genres =

New Genres is an artistic movement that began in the early 20th century. Artists within the movement work with a variety of media such as video art, body art, installation, performance, and sound art.

== Definition ==
New Genres art is commonly identified as installation art, video, film, sound, performance, Digital media, internet art, hybrid and other emerging art forms. New Genres is a practice which begins with ideas and then moves to the appropriate form or media for that particular idea, sometimes inventing entirely new sites of cultural production, new methodologies, technologies, or genres in the process. New Genres gives emphasis to questioning preconceived notions of the role of art in culture and its relationship to a specific form or medium.

== Historical context ==
While no recognized official date marks the beginning of the New Genre period, many believe that the early 20th-century work of the Dadaists and Futurists initiated this movement. Their work laid a foundation for the experimental practice of New Genres. Duchamp's "Fountain" (1917) introduced the idea of the readymade object: a non-art object which becomes viewed as art due to the intention and designation of the artist. This new use of artistic power and questioning of the art object opened up the conceptual sphere of New Genres. These discoveries illuminated the idea that art was possible outside the field of the classical genres like painting and sculpture.

To understand the movement of New Genres, it is important to look at the events occurring simultaneously in the 20th century. In the first half of the century, World War I broke out and caused devastation to much of Eastern Europe. In America, the Great Depression caused a major economic crises that affected many parts of the world. World War II quickly followed, splitting the world into two alliances: the Allies and the Axis. This war caused tremendous damage and introduced new tragedies into the world, such as the Holocaust and the first nuclear weapons.

The San Francisco Art Institute was home to one of the most influential New Genres programs in the United States. The program was started by Howard Fried, who began the program as Performance/Video in the 1970s. Alumni include Karen Finley, Nao Bustamante, and Miguel Calderon, and Rora Blue. Former faculty include Paul Kos, Doug Hall, Tony Labat, Sharon Grace, and Trisha Donnelly. The school closed permanently in July 2022.

== Current New Genres Educational Programs ==
Several universities have programs in New Genres. These include:

- Brigham Young University
- Hunter College
- Otis College of Art and Design
- Parsons School of Design
- Sarah Lawrence College
- Stanford University
- University of California, Irvine
- University of California, Los Angeles
- University of Washington
- Academy of Fine Arts Munich
