= Juan B. Wandesforde =

American painter

- Born: Juan Buckingham Wandesforde; June 24, 1817; England
- Died: November 18, 1902 (aged 85); San Francisco, California, U.S.
- Occupation: Painter
- Known for: Co-founding San Francisco Art Association

Juan Buckingham Wandesforde (June 24, 1817 – November 18, 1902) was an English-born American painter. He is known for co-founding of the San Francisco Art Association in 1871, in San Francisco, California.

== Biography ==
Juan Buckingham Wandesforde was born on June 24, 1817, in England into an aristocratic family, the Earls of Wandesforde. He studied art in England, under John Varley.

Wandesforde came to California in 1862. In 1871, he co-founded the San Francisco Art Association with Virgil Macey Williams; and served as the first president of the organization. His work can be seen at the Laguna Art Museum.
