= Harry Stuart Fonda =

- Born: August 24, 1864; Marysville, California, U.S.
- Died: August 9, 1942 (aged 77); Carthage, New York, U.S.
- Education: California School of Design, Académie Julian
- Known for: Painting

Harry Stuart Fonda (August 24, 1864–August 9, 1942) was an American painter, musician, and professor, best known for his marine and landscape paintings.

== History ==
Fonda was born August 24, 1864, in Marysville, California. He was born in a family of six children, to parents Eleanor (née Middleton) and William Thomas Fonda. From 1883–1885 he studied at California School of Design (now known as San Francisco Art Institute) with Virgil Macey Williams. From 1893–96, he studied at Académie Julian with Jean-Joseph Benjamin-Constant and Jean-Paul Laurens.

While still living in Paris on February 9, 1896, he married singer May Elizabeth MacLeod. Together with his new wife they moved to California sometimes in late 1896, eventually settling in to a home and studio at 3011 Sacramento Street in San Francisco. Fonda was a member of the Bohemian Club, joining on November 18, 1896. He sometimes taught private classes from his studio. Frequently in summers he would teach art classes in Monterey, California.

From 1897 until 1899, he was an instructor at the Mark Hopkins Institute of Art (now known as the San Francisco Art Institute). Other artists working at Mark Hopkins Institute of Art during this time period included Thomas Hill, Ernest Narjot, Emil Carlsen, Amedee Joullin, Raymond Dabb Yelland, and Douglas Tilden. Fonda's students included Pedro Joseph de Lemos, amongst others. His oil painting, House of the Four Winds, was bought by President William McKinley.

After the 1906 San Francisco earthquake, Fonda moved to Monterey, California and taught art in the public schools for one year. Fonda was a musician, a piano player and piano teacher, and he wrote a comic operetta called Prince Toggerty (1910) and starred Josephine Bruguière (mother of artist Francis Bruguière).

His wife May died in San Francisco in 1929. In 1940, he moved to Carthage, New York, to live with his daughter Louise "Elsie" LeRoy Martin, and his son-in-law. He died on August 9, 1942, in Carthage.
