= Janis Crystal Lipzin =

American artist, filmmaker, educator (b. 1945)

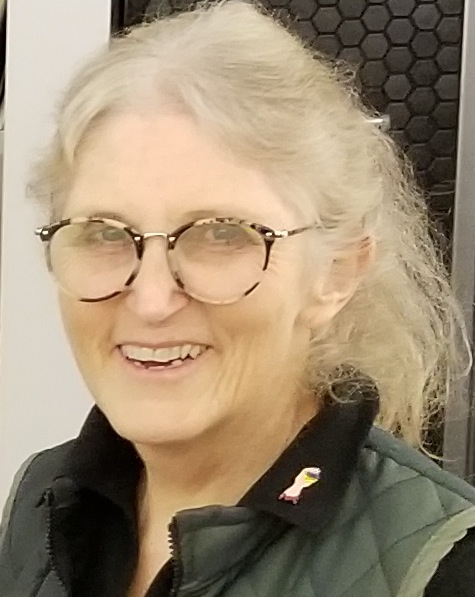
- Janis Crystal Lipzin in October 2017
- Born: 1945 (age 80–81); United States
- Education: Ohio University, New York University, San Francisco Art Institute, University of Pittsburgh
- Occupations: Visual artist, educator
- Known for: Experimental filmmaking, photography, video, audio, multi-media installations, media performance

Janis Crystal Lipzin (born 1945), is an American artist and educator, working with film, photography, video, audio, multi-media installations, and media performance. Lipzin is known for her work in many media and taught at the San Francisco Art Institute for over three decades. Lipzin's films offer a unique blend of rigorous conceptual structure, formal investigation, and sensual discovery. The Bladderwort Document is a haunting visual fantasia of her life on a farm in the 1970s; Trepanations is a droll meditation on social forces and women's appearance; and Seasonal Forces, Part One creates a fluid and immediate record of the cultural and seasonal changes in the rural landscape where she lives. She has been an active filmmaker since 1974, when she became attracted to using Super-8 cameras, in part because of their easy portability and flexibility to make changes to a film up to the moment of projection. Her more recent work incorporates both digital and analog film methods. wherein light and photo-chemistry collide and conspire to reveal aspects of our world deserving of more careful scrutiny. Her work blends an enduring interest in the volatility of nature and human events with a sympathy for alternative, hand-made methods that she interweaves with digital processes. Lipzin is based in Sonoma County, California.

== Early life and education ==
Janis Crystal Lipzin was born in 1945, in the United States. Lipzin attended Ohio University, where she received a BFA; New York University where she studied painting; and the San Francisco Art Institute, where she received an MFA. She attended the University of Pittsburgh where she received an MSLS in library and information science.

== Career ==
Her work has been recognized with exhibitions at the Museum of Modern Art, New York Film Society, Centre Pompidou (Paris), Venice Biennale, San Francisco Museum of Modern Art, the Tate Modern and other international venues. Lipzin's work was included in the Dreamlands: Immersive Cinema and Art 1905–2016 exhibition and the Color of Light exhibition at the Whitney Museum of American Art.

She taught at the San Francisco Art Institute from 1978 to 2009 where she served as Chair of the Film Department and before that directed the Film/Photography Program at Antioch College in Yellow Springs, Ohio.

Among her awards are fellowships, commissions and grants from the John Simon Guggenheim Memorial Foundation, National Endowment for the Arts, Center for Cultural Innovation, Ohio Arts Council, California Arts Council, Mission Eye and Ear, and Echo Park Film Center, Los Angeles.

Lipzin's work is included in the Carnegie Museum of Art's collection Berkeley Art Museum, and the New Museum of Contemporary Art in New York.
