= Kiro Urdin =

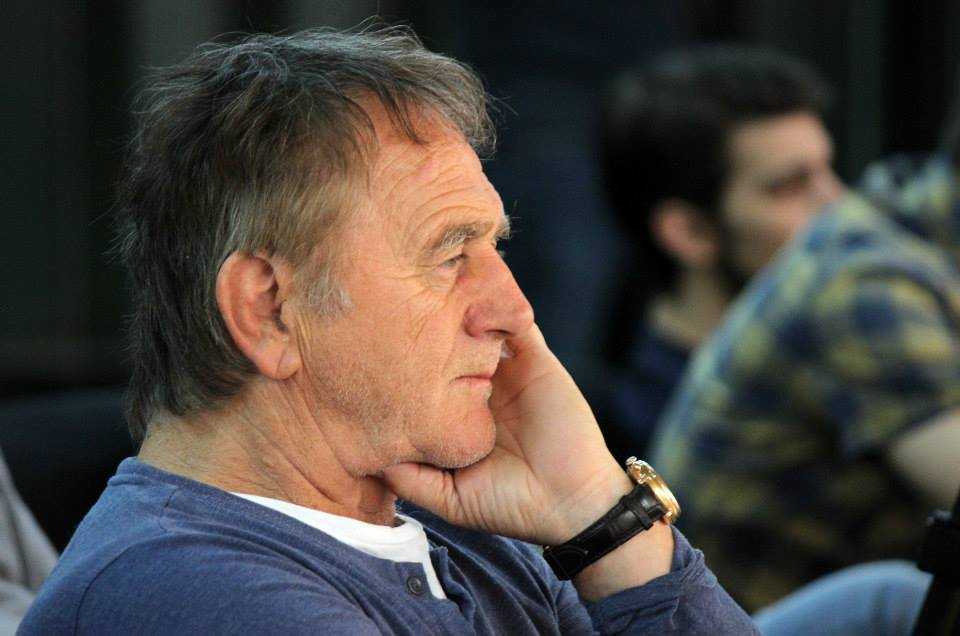
- Born: Kiro Urdinov; 12 May 1945 (age 80); Strumica, SFR Yugoslavia
- Movement: Planetarism
- Website: kirourdin.info

Kiro Urdin (Macedonian: Киро Урдин; born 1945 in Strumica, Macedonia) is a visual, multimedia artist and film director. He is the artistic founder of the Planetarism movement. He represented France at the French Festival in Tapei, and the Republic of Macedonia at the Thessaloniki - Culture Capital of Europe ’97 event in Greece. His ballet 'Planetarium' (with Debbie Wilson) and his film of the same name were performed at the United Nations 60th Anniversary. He is a member of the Macedonian Academy of Sciences and Arts and the Knight Order in the Order of Art and Literature of the French Republic.

Kiro is a citizen of both Macedonia and France.

== Early years ==
Kiro Urdin was born May 12, 1945, to Mihail Urdinov (Macedonian: Михаил Урдинов) and Makedonka (Македонка). He is the youngest of 5 children: brothers - Kostadin (1930) – a writer, Dragan (1932) – an innovator, Vasil (1935) – sculptor, gallery and restaurant owner), and a sister Katarina (1941).

Kiro initially set out to be a lawyer. He graduated from the University of Belgrade's Law School in 1969. From 1971-1973 he worked as a journalist.

In October 1973 he moved to Paris and painted tourists, since he was doing it without permission his work permit was taken. It was at that point he decided to make painting his life. Then, he enrolled at the Academy of Arts Plastiques in Paris, and in 1977, he graduated as a director from the Paris Film School. From 1982-1984, he worked as an independent painter in France, the United States, Japan, Switzerland, Sweden, Mexico, Belgium, Puerto Rico, Philippines, Taiwan.

== Career ==
=== Beginnings ===
Kiro has been painting professionally since 1985. He is known for his contemporary art paintings which have been exhibited worldwide since 1986. His art has been exhibited in cities like Yokohama, Los Angeles, London, Stockholm and Bratislava. His most famous work to date is Planetarium, a 48 square meter oil on canvas and the first painting to be worked on all over the world.

In 1988, Kiro went to New York and Hollywood to pursue his film ambitions. There he directed four films, one of which was The Art of Kiro Urdin.

=== The Planetarium Project ===
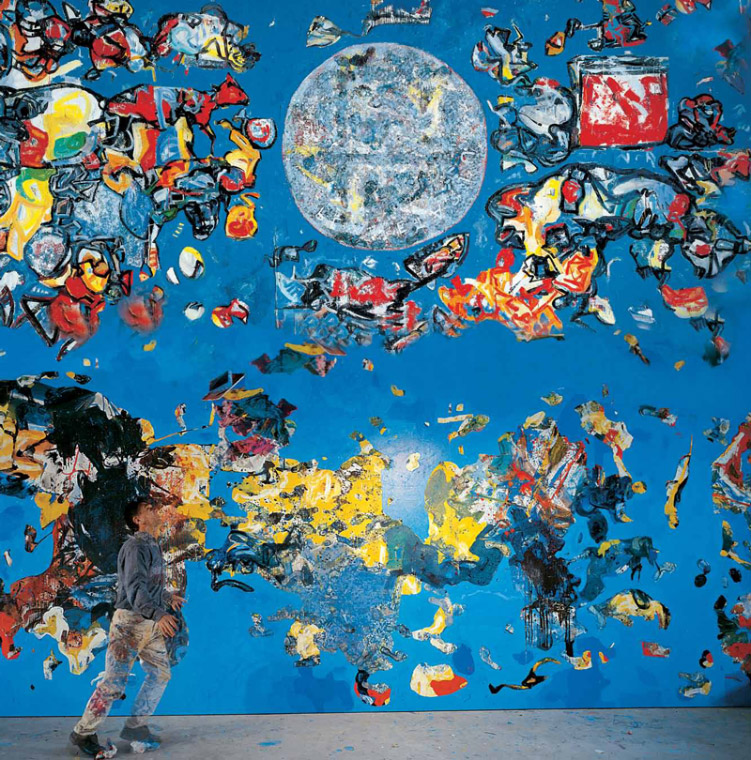
Kiro Urdin with his 48 square meter painting, Planetarium

In 1996 Kiro embarked on an epic journey around the world, in a pursuit to create the first painting to be worked on all over the world. His idea was to incorporate a piece from every place he visited, thus symbolically bringing the world together in one undivided unity. It took him two years and over thirty locations, from big urban cities to ancient world sites: the Wailing Wall in Jerusalem and the Tomb of Jesus Christ, New York, The Berlin Wall, Nerezi, Ohrid, Brussels, Knokke-le-Zoute, Bruges, Paris, Rome, Pompeii, Pisa, the Suez Canal, London, Stonehenge, Athens, Cape Soúnion, the Nile, the Great Pyramids in Giza, Kenya (Masai Mara), Machu Picchu, Cuzco, Bangkok, Peking (the Forbidden City) and the Great Wall of China, Tokyo, Kamakura, Mont Saint-Michel, Nuenenn and Eindhoven. The result of Kiro's two-year journey was a 48m2 oil painting which he entitled Planetarium.

A film crew was hired to document the effort. A documentary film entitled Planetaruim, was subsequently released. Directed by Ivan Mitevski, it won Best Documentary at the New York International Independent Film and Documentary Festival in 2005.

Also a monograph with photos taken during the two-year trip by Marin Dimevski, was released simultaneously with the movie.

Today the painting is in courtesy of the Danubiana Meulensteen Art Museum in Bratislava.

=== Collaboration with choreographer Debbie Wilson ===
Urdin was in the process of taking his painting, Planetarium, to more than 30 countries, and he would add dabs of colour in each new locale. After seeing the painting choreographer Debbie Wilson approached Kiro and proposed to expand the Planetarium experience through a new medium – dance. Macedonian composer Venko Serafimov was called on board to compose the music for the dance. The dance features eight dancers from Wilson’s own troupe, a local Toronto contemporary dance company, and seven from the classically trained Macedonian National Theatre. In an interview for Now Toronto, Debbie admits this kind of setup made the show something of a logistical nightmare.

Planetarium dance premiered in Toronto Dance Theater, Canada, and since it has been performed in Ohrid, Heraclea, Skopje, Chicago, Ankara, and during the commemoration of the United Nations 60th anniversary in Geneva.

=== Planetarism and Beyond ===
Kiro’s work has evolved beyond traditional media like film and paintings to include dance, sculpture, literature, photography, philosophy and design. So far, Kiro has published 15 books with aphorisms, one book of poetry entitled ‘Novel’. ‘Light’, a poem from the book was selected for the Pushkin Festival in Moscow.

Kiro has been driven in his efforts by one unifying philosophy: to bridge different cultures together, and to bring all art forms into one. Or as he puts it into his own words, as he defines the slogan of the Planetarism movement: “One Point everywhere, everything in one point. One Art everywhere, everything in one Art.”

== Filmography ==
Urdin's filmography includes the following:

| Year | Film | Director | Writer | Details | Notes |
|---|---|---|---|---|---|
| 1971 | Pishta | Yes | Yes | Film 35 mm, 12 min, OSMOSA Production | |
| 1994 | I love you, Iban | Yes | Yes | Film 16mm, 25 min, MRTV Production | Cinematographer |
| 1998 | L’art de Kiro Urdin | Ivan Mitevski | Ivan Mitevski | Film 16mm, 20 min, MRTV Production | |
| 1998 | Planetarium | Kiro Urdin, Ivan Mitevski | Yes | Film 35mm, 57 min, Kiro Urdin & MRTV Production | Appearing as himself |
| 2002 | Dogona | Yes | Yes | Film 16mm, 26 min, OSMOSA Production | |
| 2004 | Debbie Wilson and Planetarium | Yes | Yes | Film 16mm, 35 min, OSMOSA Production | |
| 2005 | Kiro Urdin at Guy Peters Gallery, Saint-Paul-de-Vence | Ivan Mitevski | Ivan Mitevski | Full HD film, 34 min, OSMOSA & MRTV Production | Appearing as himself |
| 2007 | Dogs and Trains | Yes | Yes | Full HD film, 34 min, OSMOSA Production | |
| 2008 | Water and Fire | Yes | Yes | Full HD film, 60 min, OSMOSA Production | |
| 2011 | Two Times | Yes | Yes | Full HD film, 44 min, OSMOSA Production | |
| 2012 | Steps | Yes | Yes | Full HD film, 15 min, OSMOSA Production | |

== Books ==
Urdin has authored the following books:

| Year | Book | Description |
|---|---|---|
| 1973 | Двојници | Aphorisms & Caricatures |
| 1999 | Planetarisms | Aphorisms |
| 2008 | Consequences | Aphorisms |
| 2008 | Dimensions | Aphorisms |
| 2008 | Destinies | Aphorisms |
| 2009 | Novel | Poetry |
| 2011 | Crevices | Aphorisms |
| 2011 | Egoisms | Aphorisms |
| 2011 | Irregularities | Aphorisms |
| 2012 | Universe | Aphorisms |
| 2012 | Paradoxes | Aphorisms |
| 2012 | Avant-Gards | Aphorisms |
| 2012 | Mutants | Aphorisms |
| 2012 | Women | Aphorisms |
| 2012 | Friend | Aphorisms |
| 2012 | Smiles | Aphorisms |

== Awards and nominations ==
During the course of his film career, Kiro has received many awards and nominations.

| Year | Title | Festival | Award | Status |
|---|---|---|---|---|
| 1998 | Planetarium | 38th Festival de TV de Monte-Carlo | Best Documentary | Nominated |
| 2005 | Planetarium | New York International Independent Film and Video Festival | Best Documentary | Won |
| 2012 | Planetarium | Vaasa International Nature Film Festival | Terranova Artistic Award | Won |
| 2008 | Water and Fire | International Film Festival Jahorina | Grand Prix | Won |
| 2009 | Water and Fire | New York International Independent Film and Video Festival | Best International Director of a Documentary | Won |
| 2009 | Water and Fire | New York International Independent Film and Video Festival | Best Cinematography | Won |
| 2009 | Water and Fire | European Film Festival Green Wave | Grand Prix | Won |
| 2009 | Water and Fire | International Film Festival Ohrid | Grand Prix | Won |
| 2005 | Dogona | Rose Dor | Official selection | |
| 2012 | Dogona | European Film Festival Green Wave | Special Jury Award | Won |
| 2012 | Two Times | China International Animal and Nature Film Festival | Best Natural Environment Film | Won |
| 2012 | Two Times | Vaasa International Nature Film Festival | The Ostrobothnia Australis Award | Nominated |
