= Virgil Macey Williams =

American painter

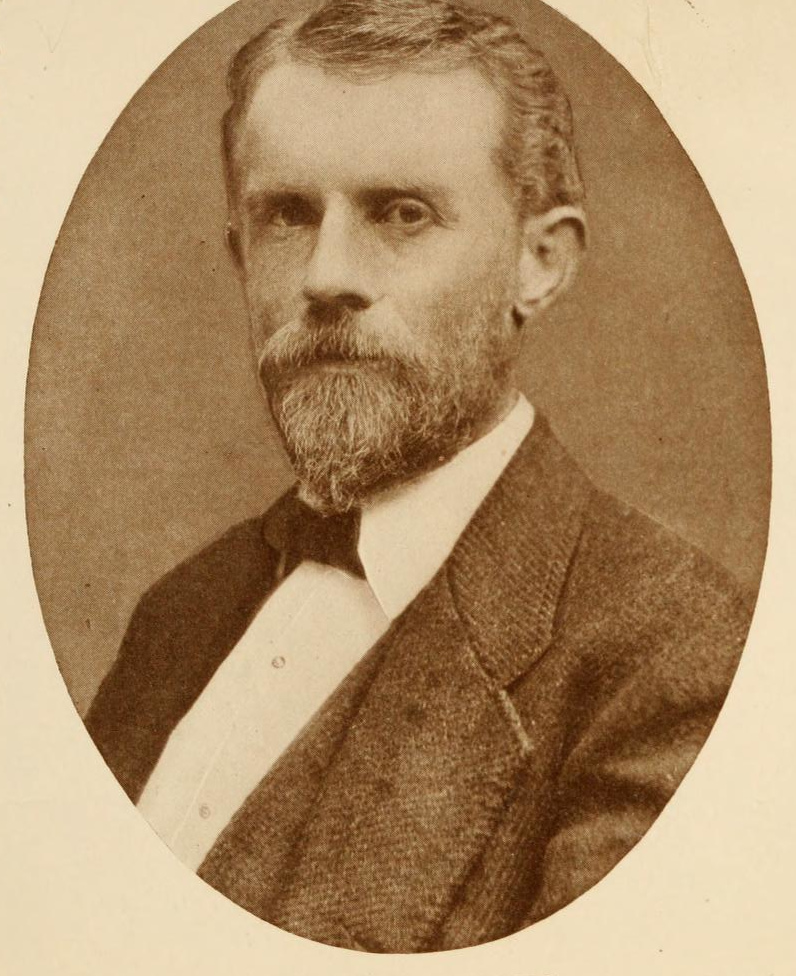
- Born: October 29, 1830; Dixfield, Maine, U.S.
- Died: December 18, 1886 (aged 56); Napa County, California, California, U.S.
- Education: Brown University
- Occupation: Painter
- Spouses: Mary Page
- Relatives: William Page (father-in-law)

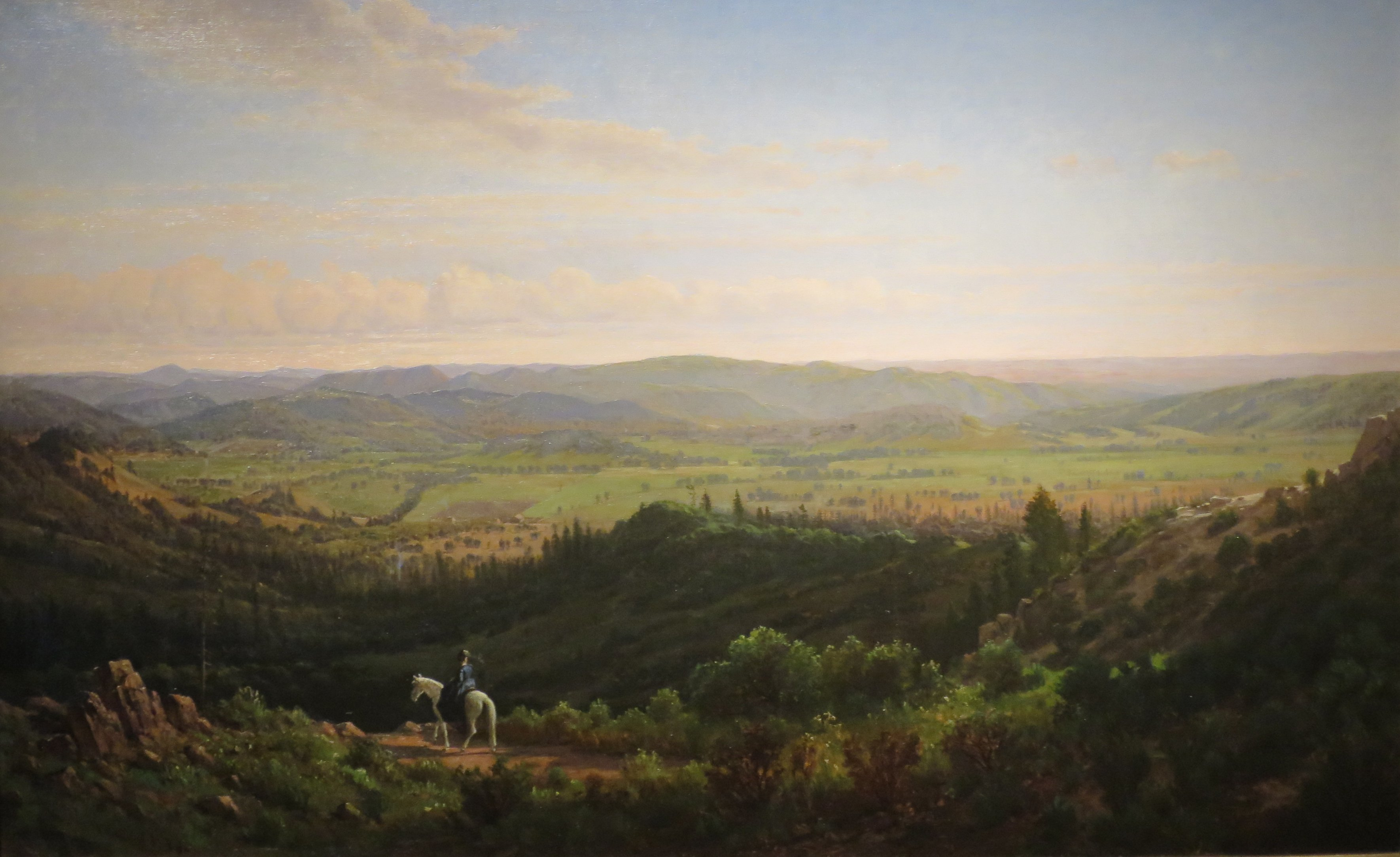
Knight's Valley from the Slopes of Mount St. Helena by Virgil Williams, 1873, oil on canvas, De Young Museum

Virgil Macey Williams (October 29, 1830 – December 18, 1886) was an American painter, and the director of the San Francisco School of Design (now known as San Francisco Art Institute). In 1872, he co-founded the San Francisco Art Association with Juan B. Wandesforde.

Students of Williams included Harry Stuart Fonda, John Marshall Gamble, and James Everett Stuart, amongst others.
