= Will Zang =

Chinese filmmaker

- 臧剑
- Born: Beijing, China
- Education: San Francisco Art Institute, California College of the Arts
- Occupations: Director; Producer; Writer; Film Publicist
- Notable work: Real Kink (2016); Dress Up Like Mrs. Doubtfire (2019); The Leaf (2021)

Will Zang (Chinese: 臧剑, also known as William Jian Zang) is a Chinese filmmaker, screenwriter and publicist, known for making short documentary films that exploring cultural and sexual minority contents. He first gained recognition for directing Real Kink (2016) and found further success with Dress Up Like Mrs. Doubtfire (2019) and The Leaf (2021).

== Early life ==
William Jian Zang was born and raised in Beijing. He is gay. He majored in International Relations at college, and then found interest in film and started involving many productions in China. In 2013, Zang moved to San Francisco, California for school. He graduated from San Francisco Art Institute, and the California College of the Arts.

== Career ==
When Zang was in China, he had involved in several film and TV drama productions, credits include TV shows Da Tang Fu Rong Yuan (2007), The Heaven Sword and Dragon Saber (2009), Journey to the West (2011), and animation film Legend of Kung Fu Rabbit (also known as Legend of a Rabbit) (2011).

Since 2010, Zang has been a contributing writer for Mtime.com, and Culture Monthly, and has published many articles on the film market, history, and production. Zang authored Annual Report on Development of China's Animation Industry.

In 2016, his feature documentary film Real Kink world premiered at the Tampa International Gay & Lesbian Film Festival.

In 2021, his short film The Leaf released at the Roxie Theater. The film has also been selected for the Stop Asian Hate, Identity, & Trauma in a Pandemic: Asian American Short Films, a short film exhibition program curated by Foundation for Asian American Independent Media and sponsored by the Northwestern University Asian American Studies Program and Counseling and Psychological Services.

Zang's short films have been screened at multiple national and international film festivals, include DOC NYC, CAAMFest, Portland Pride Pics, Out Film CT Festival,Frameline Film Festival, Inside Out Toronto Film Festival, Los Angeles Asian Pacific Film Festival, Calgary International Film Festival, United Nations Association Film Festivals.

Additional to film directing and producing, Zang is also a film publicist, has worked on multiple film projects. He played roles in other productions as producer, cinematographer, still photographer, first assistant director and editorial assistant. His credits include short films and feature documentaries, such as The Untold Tales of Armistead Maupin (2017), The Fabulous Allan Carr (2017) and Ri Luo Qi Ci: Seven Days (2015). Since 2012, he has independently directing films including shorts Ebb (2012), The Distance Between (2014), and The Masterpiece (2018).

== Filmography ==
Year	Title	Notes
2012	Ebb	short film
2013	Let Me Learn the Lessons that You Have Hidden	
2014	The Distance Between	short film
2015	Ri Luo Qi Ci: Seven Days	
2016	Real Kink	
2017	The Fabulous Allan Carr	
2017	The Untold Tales of Armistead Maupin	
2018	The Masterpiece	short film
2019	Dress Up Like Mrs. Doubtfire	
2021	The Leaf	
