= Suzette A. Priola =

American molecular neurobiologist

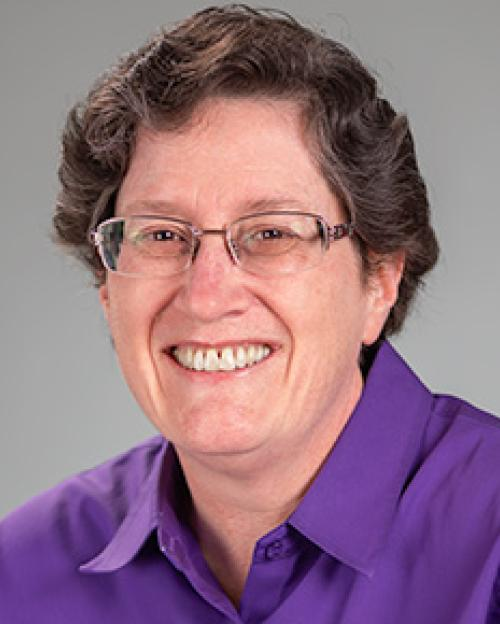
- Education: University of California, Los Angeles
- Scientific career
- Fields: Molecular neurobiology, prion diseases
- Workplaces: National Institutes of Health

Suzette Alise Priola is an American molecular neurobiologist serving as deputy chief of the Laboratory of Neurological Infections and Immunity at the National Institute of Allergy and Infectious Diseases.

== Career ==
Priola received a Ph.D. in microbiology and immunology in 1990 from the University of California, Los Angeles.

In 1991, she joined the Rocky Mountain Laboratories where she later became a senior investigator. She is a former chair of the Food and Drug Administration (FDA) transmissible spongiform encephalopathy (TSE) advisory committee and is currently deputy chief of the Laboratory of Neurological Infections and Immunity and chief of the TSE and Prion Molecular Biology Section.

Priola's major research areas include prion diseases and molecular mechanisms of neurodegenerative diseases.
