= Narjot de Toucy =

Narjot de Toucy is the name of:

- Narjot I de Toucy, who became Lord of Toucy in 1100
- Narjot II de Toucy (died 1192), grandson of the preceding
- Narjot de Toucy (died 1241), Regent of Constantinople, second son of the preceding
- Narjot de Toucy (died 1293), Admiral of Sicily, grandson of the preceding
