= Aziz + Cucher =

American artist duo

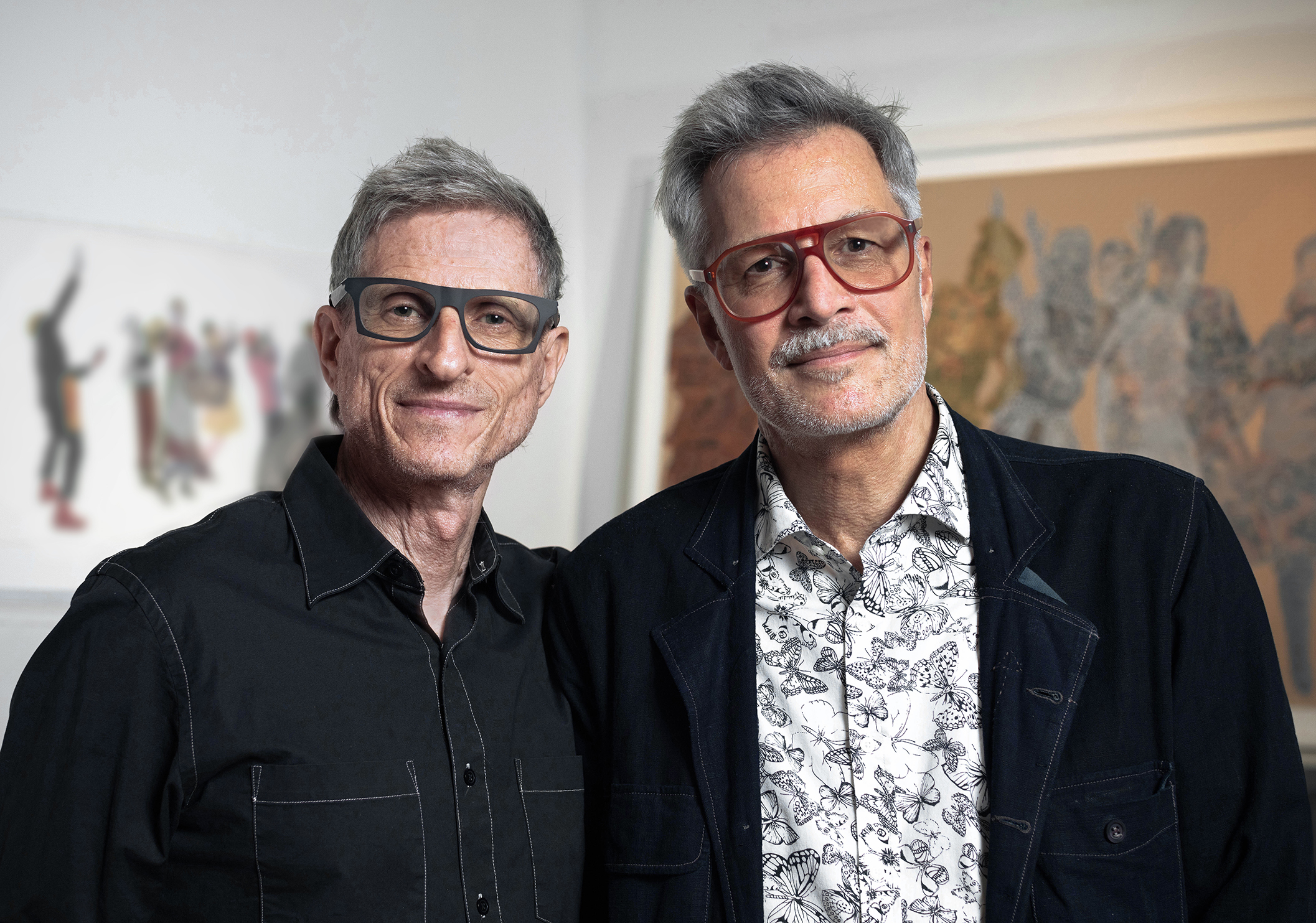
- Sammy Cucher and Anthony Aziz in their studio in Gowanus, Brooklyn, NY in 2022
- Born: Anthony Aziz; 1961 (age 64–65); Lunenburg, Massachusetts, U.S. Sammy Cucher; 1958 (age 67–68); Lima, Peru
- Education: San Francisco Art Institute
- Known for: Photography, digital media, video, sculpture
- Awards: Pollock-Krasner Foundation; Friends of Photography
- Website: www.azizcucher.net

Anthony Aziz (born 1961) and Sammy Cucher (born 1958) are American artists based in Brooklyn, New York who work together as the collaborative duo Aziz + Cucher. Their interdisciplinary practice has included digital photography and animation, video, textiles, screen-printing and sculpture. They emerged in the early 1990s and are regarded as pioneers in post-photography and the then-nascent use of digital imaging in fine art. The duo's earlier photography and sculptures centered on socio-anthropological themes, such as dehumanization, communication breakdown and notions of utopia or dystopia in relation to advancing technology. In later installations and exhibitions, they have taken a more political approach, examining issues such as war, inequality and the effects of globalization.

Aziz + Cucher have exhibited at venues including the New Museum, Venice Biennale, Los Angeles County Museum of Art (LACMA), San Francisco Museum of Modern Art (SFMOMA), MASS MoCA and International Center of Photography. Their artwork belongs to the public collections of LACMA, SFMOMA, Fonds national d'art contemporain (Paris), Galería de Arte Nacional (Caracas), and the Museum of Contemporary Photography, among others.

== Biographies ==
Anthony Aziz was born in 1961 in Lunenburg, Massachusetts. He is a third generation Lebanese-American with extended family still living in Lebanon. He received a BA degree in philosophy from Boston College in 1983, then studied film, photography and art history before enrolling at the San Francisco Art Institute (SFAI) and earning an MA in 1990. While at SFAI, he focused on photographic and text projects involving the public presentation of masculinity and power. Aziz is a professor of fine art and photography at The New School in New York.

Sammy Cucher was born in 1958 in Lima, Peru into a Jewish family and was raised in Caracas, Venezuela. His family later emigrated to Israel. He studied experimental theater and received a BFA degree from Tisch School of the Arts at New York University in 1983. After participating in the New York avant-garde theater scene until 1985, he enrolled at the San Francisco Art Institute and earned an MFA degree in 1992 with an emphasis on video and art. Cucher is a part-time assistant professor at The New School.

Cucher and Aziz met in graduate school at SFAI and began collaborating in 1990. They have been life and work partners since 1992. Their early solo exhibitions took place at New Langton Arts in San Francisco, Jack Shainman Gallery in New York, the 1995 Venice Biennale, and The Photographers' Gallery in London, among other venues. In 1997, they moved to New York City.

== Work and critical reception ==
Aziz + Cucher, Maria, C-print, 50" x 40", 1994–95. Collection of the Los Angeles County Museum of Art.

In their first decade, Aziz + Cucher explored intersections between the social, biological and technological realms, particularly notions of the post-human condition and potential pathologies associated with progress. Focused on the human body—often technologically transformed, though not necessarily improved—their metaphorical projects frequently used new digital approaches to produce images and objects that were previously unattainable. Critics related this work to Surrealist evocations of the "uncanny" that grafted doll parts or objects to human form, such as those of Hans Bellmer and Man Ray.

In the mid-2000s, they shifted to layered allegorical work focused on geopolitical conflict (particularly in the Middle East), human history and globalization, often taking a tragicomic, absurdist tone. Less centered on the body and technology, this work is characterized by an expanded range of medium and approach, including videos and multi-channel video installations, digital animations, works on canvas, and tapestries that combine digital and folk-inspired imagery.

=== Projects, 1992–2008 ===
Beginning in the early 1990s, Aziz + Cucher produced several series that explored metaphors for organic-technological interface, often centered on skin as a boundary or site of intervention. Their first collaborative series, Faith, Honor and Beauty (1992–93), was created in a climate of NEA censorship of art with sexual content at the height of the AIDS crisis. It consisted of ten larger-than-life-size color photographs of robust, optimistic-looking male and female nudes with unnervingly idealized bodies—they lacked genitals, nipples and navels—that evoked a genetically altered, possible super race. The figures struck poses echoing conventions of classical statuary, Social Realist portraiture and fascist art, while bearing props (e.g., a laptop, fur coat, basket of apples, rifle, child) that marked them as ironic archetypes mocking consumerism, conformity and ultra-conservative values. Village Voice critic Vince Aletti called them "heroes for a society in flight from sex and desire, as scary as they are seductive"; Artweek's Tony Reveaux described the series as "right-wing political correctness stretched to its logical, anti-humanist conclusion."

The duo extended that work with perhaps their best-known series of works, "Dystopia" (1994–95). These digitally altered "portraits" examined representation, alienation, and the artists' perceived sense of the potential diminishment of human identity and interaction in the wake of an uncritical embrace of information technology. The large-scale photographs featured heads of regular men and women with smooth skin "grafted" over all their sense-organ orifices, rendering them vaguely alien yet still human in temperament (e.g., Maria, 1994–95); more troubling to critics was their sense of being sealed tight against the world, deaf, dumb, blind and possibly trapped—and pointedly, beyond pleasure and desire.

Aziz + Cucher, Chimera #1, Light jet c-print, 60" x 30", 1998.

With the exhibition "Plasmorphica" (1997, Jack Shainman Gallery), Aziz + Cucher made their first foray into sculpture, displaying biomorphic, hybrid objects on floor-to-ceiling poles alongside slick, product-display-like photographs of the same forms. The sculptures were created by casting ergonomic common items (computer mouse, phone, remote control), reworking them with organic protuberances, nodules and bulges, and then shrink-wrapping them in plastic skin. Reviewers characterized the objects as "chilling" with a "sinister playfulness" that synthesized senses of the commercial, erotic, strange and intrusive. In Dominique Nahas's words, they were "tantalizingly suggestive of interchangeable, anonymous, polymorphic, amputated body parts, tensed muscles, prosthetic devices and feral sex toys." Aziz + Cucher re-photographed the objects in the "Chimeras" series (1998–99), digitally "sheathing" them with simulated human skin detailed with photorealistic pores, moles, freckles and body hair. Tema Celeste deemed them "at once disturbing and familiar … like the amputated torsos of robots given organic form." The duo's "Interiors" images (1999–2001) continued to work with human skin divorced from the figure, this time through digital transformations of open, unadorned, minimalist interiors into "living" spaces covered in realistic flesh, whose doorways and hallways suggested body cavities and passages.

In two subsequent projects, Aziz + Cucher shifted away from visceral depictions of the body and skin. The digital drawings of the "Naturalia" series (2000–01) imitated 19th-century anatomical illustrations, depicting fictional anatomical organs along with pseudo-technical terminology, diagrams and bibliographic citations that gave the illusion of real scientific research. In the "Synaptic Bliss" video and print works (2004–08), they moved toward the landscape and consciousness, seeking to evoke the human life force through a hallucinatory, artificial nature recalling psychedelic states of mind, which and blurred boundaries between inside and outside.

=== Later work, 2009–present ===
Aziz + Cucher, In Some Country Under A Sun And Some Clouds, 8-channel video installation, 2012. Installation view, Indianapolis Museum of Art.

After largely suppressing overt reference to their own identities in their work for over a decade, Aziz + Cucher turned to a more direct and personal, if metaphorical, engagement with geopolitical conflict and history in the latter 2000s. It was borne out of their individual responses, family connections and sense of anxiety and helplessness with regard to a series of tragic events: 9/11, the U.S. invasion of Iraq, and in particular, the Second Lebanon War (or Israeli-Hezbollah War) in 2006. This work first appeared in "Some People" (2012), their multi-disciplinary exhibition at the Indianapolis Museum of Art, which featured four stylistically diverse video works begun in 2009 and shot during travels through conflict-fraught areas—Israel, Lebanon, Croatia, Serbia and Bosnia. Non-narrative, but additive in relation to one another, the videos explored the tragicomic in relation to everyday life, notions of history and progress, ideology and art.

In the show's multi-screen video installation The Time of the Empress, the duo presented loops of digitally animated, stripped-down modernist buildings (based on bombed-out structures shot in Bosnia) that rhythmically grew upward in tiny accumulating line segments and simultaneously collapsed from below into pixilated dust. Reviews likened the sequences to "a series of Towers of Babel," evoking the rise and fall of empires, historical cycles of progress and regression or chaos and order, and the stubbornness of human innovation. Artforum contended that the installation conveyed both "a sense of lost promise [and] the possibility for future reclamation." The duo employed eight screens for In Some Country Under a Sun and Some Clouds, each of which showed a person in post-apocalyptic-like attire contorted unnaturally as if in paralysis before a vast desert—a commentary on the hardening of fixed ideological positions. Report From the Front was a mockumentary about an archaeological dig that satirized the politicized nature of such events in Israel. In By Aporia, Pure and Simple (2012), the artists appeared for the first time in their work. An expression of their refusal of silence, impotence, despair and the absurdity of wrestling with the madness of terrorism and Middle East conflict through art, the video chronicled them in everyday life (working, taking the subway, walking New York neighborhoods)—in the guise of "fools" wearing clown costumes the entire time.

Aziz + Cucher, Some People, Cotton and wool jacquard tapestry, 74" x 124", 2014.

The duo extended these themes in their "Tapestries" cycle (2014–17) a series of collage-like Jacquard loom works, seeking to update the medieval European medium of pictorial narrative with their version of contemporary history paintings. The tapestries reworked digital imagery from their travels and the "Some People" videos—twisted figures, battlefield sites, jet fighters, nonsensical flags and signs, animals, themselves in clown garb—using Renaissance compositional strategies and an absurdist theater approach (e.g., Some People, 2014); the shifting perspectives offered uneasy commentary on modern hypocrisy, human conflict and the complexities and contradictions of global politics.

In the installation You're Welcome and I'm Sorry (2019, MASS MoCA), Aziz + Cucher portrayed the polarizing effects of inequality and the absurdity of modern political theater, mocking neoconservative policies, white nationalist ideologies and claims of economic ignorance made by world leaders in the aftermath of the 2008 financial crisis. Placed within a room painted in circus stripes (the colors derived from bank logos), the six-channel video featured parodistic, whirling and orating business characters in costumes and masks made from repurposed shirts, ties, and deconstructed power suits. They appeared in shifting, quasi-corporate environments (the World Economic Forum stage, Wall Street offices) alongside stock exchange banners, emojis and slot machines, accompanied by a soundtrack of financial verbiage and metal music.

The artists reprised the MASS MoCA piece's title in their 2022 exhibition at Gazelli Art House in London, which included thirty years of work, including new mixed-media paintings. In these works on canvas, such as The Lobby (2022), they continued in the vein of the prior installation, combining satiric social commentary, bright colors, layered patterning, spatial disorientation and characters in tattered corporate wear and masks. Brooklyn Rail critic Tennae Maki suggested the paintings brought their work around full circle: "the manic, oscillating mechanization found within the exhibition mirrors the very paradox that the artists have long endeavored to address. It marries the gifts and penalties that digital technology has bestowed onto society—you’re welcome and I’m sorry."

== Museum collections and awards ==
Aziz + Cucher's artwork belongs to the public collections of international institutions including the Brondesbury Collection, C-Collection (Lichtenstein), di Rosa Center for Contemporary Art, Fonds national d'art contemporain, Galería de Arte Nacional (Caracas), Indianapolis Museum of Art, Kalamazoo Institute of Arts, Leslie-Lohman Museum of Art, Los Angeles County Museum of Art, Museo de Arte Contemporáneo de Castilla y León (MUSAC), Museum of Contemporary Photography, National Gallery of Australia, San Francisco Museum of Modern Art, and San Jose Museum of Art, among others.

Aziz + Cucher have received grants and awards from the Pollock-Krasner Foundation (2002, 2017, 2022), New York Foundation for the Arts (2003, 2015) and Friends of Photography (Ruttenberg Award, 1996), among others. The Pollock-Krasner Foundation award represented the first time it was given to artists working with photography and digital media. They have received artist residencies from Djerassi, the Frans Masereel Centrum (Belgium) and the San Francisco Art Institute.
