= Michael Henderson (writer) =

British journalist (born 1958)

Michael Henderson (born 1958) is a British journalist, born in Manchester, and raised in Bolton. He was educated at a preparatory school in Derbyshire and then at Repton School. Originally purely a sportswriter, he has since diversified into a wider range of cultural journalism.

Henderson began his career writing for local newspapers, initially covering Rochdale F.C. Later, he graduated to The Times, where he reported extensively on both cricket and football. In 1999, he moved to The Daily Telegraph as cricket correspondent, before joining the Daily Mail as a general sportswriter in 2002.

He has contributed sporting and general commentary to The Daily Telegraph, and for some time had a sports column on Thursdays and a more general column on Saturdays, but he ceased to regularly contribute to the Telegraph in April 2008. He has continued to contribute occasionally to the other papers he previously worked for, as well as The Wisden Cricketer and The Spectator. Henderson has also freelanced for The Guardian and The Observer.

His first book was 50 People Who Fouled Up Football (2009). Of his 2020 book That Will Be England Gone: The Last Summer of Cricket, the reviewer in The Yorkshire Post said it was "not just a sports book, which is why it is so good" and that it was about "what it means to be English".
