= Ernest Narjot =

American painter

Ernest Étienne Narjot (December 25, 1826 – August 24, 1898) was an American artist of the 19th century. He produced many paintings of California landscape, in particular of life in the Gold Country.

== Life ==
Ernest Étienne Narjot was born in on December 25, 1826, in Saint-Malo, France. He was brought up in Paris and studied art there before coming to California in 1849 to join the California Gold Rush. He spent three unproductive years in the Gold Country, panning for gold at Fosters Bar on the Yuba River. In 1851, he joined a French mining expedition to Sonora, Mexico. The expedition was not a success, but Narjot remained in Sonora where he bought a ranch and married a local woman, Santos Ortiz. He continued mining, painting and breeding horses in the area but eventually returned to San Francisco with his family in 1865 and set up a studio at 610 Clay Street. By the 1880s, he had established himself as one of California's foremost painters.

In the early 1890s, Narjot was commissioned to paint the ceiling at Leland Stanford, Jr.'s tomb at Stanford University and, while working there, paint splashed in his eyes. As a result, Narjot was blinded in one eye and his health began to deteriorate. By 1897, his economic circumstances had declined to a point that he was forced to move to a tenement. In response, thirty prominent California artists, among them Thomas Hill, Amédée Joullin, William Keith and Arthur Mathews, came to his aid with a benefit sale of their work. He died in San Francisco on August 24, 1898.

== Work ==
Although his work included landscapes, portraits, church murals and frescos, as well as book illustrations, Narjot is best known for his art depicting experiences and recollections of his life as a forty-niner, such as his 1882 work, Miners: A Moment at Rest (Autry Museum of Western Heritage, Los Angeles). Only one surviving work of Narjot's was actually executed while he was at the Mother Lode. Many others were executed years later and bear a certain sense of nostalgia.

Narjot's paintings and drawings are held mostly in California institutions, including the California Historical Society; Oakland Museum of California; Museum of the American West; California State Library; Santa Barbara Museum of Art; Bancroft Library (University of California at Berkeley); Crocker Art Museum, (Sacramento, CA); Silverado Museum (St Helena, CA); De Young Museum; Los Angeles Athletic Club; Los Angeles County Museum of Art. Many of his paintings were destroyed in the 1906 San Francisco earthquake and fire.

== Works ==
- 1888 - Bathing at Glen Ellen, oil on canvas, Shasta State Historic Park, Shasta County, California
