= Tony Labat =

Cuban-American multimedia artist

- Born: 1951 (age 74–75); Havana, Cuba
- Education: San Francisco Art Institute
- Occupations: Multimedia artist, installation artist, professor, academic administrator

Tony Labat (born 1951) is a Cuban-born American multimedia artist, installation artist, and professor. He has exhibited internationally, developing a body of work in performance, video, sculpture and installation. Labat's work has dealt with investigations of the body, popular culture, identity, urban relations, politics, and the media.

== Early life and education ==
Labat was born in Havana, Cuba in 1951. He emigrated from Cuba to Miami, Florida in 1965, when he was fifteen years old. He received his BFA degree (1978) and his MFA degree (1980) from the San Francisco Art Institute (SFAI).

== Career ==
Since the early 1980s, Labat has been a participant in the California performance and video scene and has spent most of his career in San Francisco.

On June 4, 1981, Labat boxed sculptor Tom Chapman in a four-round bout at Kezar Pavilion in San Francisco. "They went into the Kezar Pavilion ring to create a 'performative piece' of pugilistic conceptual art," wrote San Francisco Examiner columnist Bill Mandel, "and ended up in a four-round street fight." From video footage of the fight, Labat created a piece titled "Challenge: POV" (1981).

== Collections (selection) ==
Labat's artwork is included in the collection of the Museum of Modern Art, New York; Centre Pompidou, Paris; the Pérez Art Museum Miami, Florida, and Oakland Museum of California, among others.

== Exhibitions ==
In 2005, Labat had a survey exhibition of his work in conjunction with the publication of "Trust Me" at New Langton Arts. Other exhibitions include:

- “I Want You,” San Francisco Museum of Art, San Francisco, California
- "Tony Labat and Ignacio Lang," at Harris/Lieberman Gallery, New York City, New York
- "I Like To Watch," The Canal Chapter, New York City, New York
- "Xtreme Sparring," El Museo del Barrio, New York City, New York
- Gallery Paule Anglim, San Francisco, California
- "Time and Transition in Contemporary Cuban Art," Mestna Galerija, Ljubljana, Slovenia
- "Mata Crush," Havana Bienal, Havana, Cuba;
- "Trading Places," Gallery Hit, Bratislava, Slovakia, Czech Republic
- "Mapping the Outside: (Fat Chance Bruce Nauman)," Seville Biennial, Seville, Spain
- "Mayami: Between Cut and Action," Centre Georges Pompidou, Paris, France
- "Moving Target," Helsinki City Art Museum, Helsinki
- "Random Topography," NoD Gallery, Prague, Czech Republic
- "Performance Anxiety," UC Berkeley Art Museum, Berkeley, California
- "Tony Labat: Four Installations," Museum of Contemporary Art (MOCA), Los Angeles, California
- 2026 This Is America: Selections from PAMM's Collection, Pérez Art Museum Miami, Florida
