= J. John Priola =

American artist and photographer

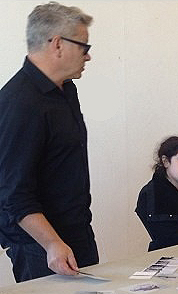
- Photograph of Priola in the classroom
- Born: 1960 (age 65–66); Denver, Colorado, United States
- Education: San Francisco Art Institute, Metropolitan State College
- Known for: Photographic series, books, installation art
- Awards: California Arts Council, Artadia Award
- Website: J. John Priola

J. John Priola is a San Francisco-based contemporary visual artist and educator. He is known for photographic series capturing humble, generally inanimate subjects that explore human presence, absence and loss through visual metaphor. Priola's mature work can be broadly divided into earlier black-and-white, gelatin-silver series—formal elegant, painterly works largely focused on everyday objects and architectural details elevated to portraits—and later color series, which gradually shifted from architectural settings to detailed, varied explorations of the often-conflicted human relationship to nature. San Francisco Chronicle critic Kenneth Baker situated Priola's images "on the border between documentary and conceptual art," where they function as surveys of under-noticed details that "remind us how many potential questions, how much intimate domestic history, may lie embedded on the margins of our attention."

Priola's work belongs to the public art collections of the Metropolitan Museum of Art, Art Institute of Chicago, San Francisco Museum of Modern Art and Philadelphia Museum of Art, among others. He has exhibited at museums including the Berkeley Art Museum and Pacific Film Archive, George Eastman Museum, Schirn Kunsthalle Frankfurt and Galleria d'Arte Moderna, Bologna, and at Gallery Paule Anglim, now Anglim/Trimble Gallery, in San Francisco. Priola has published two books, Once Removed (1998) and Natural Light (2022).

J. John Priola, Dish Towel, gelatin-silver print, framed 24" x 20", 1995.

== Education and early work ==
Priola was born in 1960 on a family farm near Denver, Colorado. He studied art at Metropolitan State College in Denver (BA, 1984) and the San Francisco Art Institute (MFA, 1987).

Between 1988 and 1993, Priola gained recognition for exhibitions at venues including SF Camerawork, Intersection for the Arts and New Langton Arts, of tableaux vivants, mixed-media installations and photographic series that explored sexual identity, gender and Jungian concepts of the psyche through lenses such as Renaissance masterworks, religion and domestic roles. His tableaux vivants portrayed baroque, operatic scenes—often featuring himself playing various roles, male and female, along with artist friends—that critic Glen Helfand described as "visceral, slightly deranged and frankly homoerotic motifs" appropriated from paintings by Titian, Caravaggio and others.

Priola's installations consisted of extravagant, moody environments that functioned like theatrical extensions of the images, which he often concealed with draperies, instilling a voyeuristic element. He gradually turned to more claustrophobic or chapel-like installations that shifted thematically from gender to religious intolerance and oppression, the AIDS epidemic and bodily experience.

== Black-and-white photographic series (1993–2008) ==
Writers have situated Priola's black-and-white work among a generation of post-deconstruction photographers that sought to re-establish faith in the medium's "essential connectedness to its subject," identifying an uncanny, evocative quality that renders recognizable objects enigmatic and open to emotions and narratives—cinematic, therapeutic, evidential—that viewers fabricate for them. San Francisco Examiner critic David Bonetti wrote, "Priola is an elegiac poet of the camera, and his pictures explore feelings of nostalgia, emptiness, absence, loss and melancholy … Spurs to memory [his] still life/portraits become touching memento mori."

J. John Priola, Nail, gelatin-silver print, framed 40" x 32", 1997.

Priola's "Paradise" (1993–94) and "Saved" (1995–97) series consisted of small photographs (the former group in a round format) of everyday objects and odd personal mementos—jewel box, old notebook, fragment of lace, broken plastic horse—isolated against depthless black space. Los Angeles Times critic Susan Kandel observed "they function as allegories of the photographic project itself… Ordinary things are rendered extraordinary in and through the processes of representation … Meaning is conceived as an after-effect, a residue of form." Reviews characterized "Saved" images (e.g., Dish Towel, 1995) as haunting, somber and commemorative: "exceedingly humble object(s) … transformed by the artist into a thing of wonder and nobility" with wounds and usage matter-of-factly on display.

In subsequent series, Priola turned to architectural details, neglected grave sites and outdoor scenes. Critics described his architectural works as "elegies" focused on human traces and symbols or isolated ciphers (recalling similar subjects by Walker Evans and Lee Friedlander). The largely white, austere "White Wall" (1997–99) works depicted patches of wall betraying time, use, or neglect, such as a faintly discolored oval beneath a nail where a mirror once blocked the wall from being bleached by the sun (Nail, 1997); the nourish "Numbers" series (2000) presented illuminated door numbers eerily isolated against dark, nondescript slabs of wall.

Priola took a similarly abstract, formal approach to three subsequent series. The "Dwell" (2001–02) images looked from deep blackness out or into centered residential windows illuminated by muffled outside or interior light. Dating 2005–08, "Foundation Vents" and "Weep Holes" (holes in retaining walls to permit drainage) captured easy-to-miss functional elements, raising them in Kenneth Baker's words, to "tiny architectural epiphanies, in a plainspoken manner" that quietly revived "the romance" of the photograph as index.

== Color photographic series (2009– ) ==
J. John Priola, Green Moss & Lichen, archival pigment prints, velvet wrapped frames, 30" x 23" each, 2022.

The first of Priola's color projects, "Philanthropy" (2010–11) extended his architectural interests to objects set outside dwellings—specifically bags, boxes, mystery objects and bits of furniture that people bundled and left for pickup as charitable donations. The seventy-five digital color images of deliberately and loosely arranged items function as both still lifes—tied to the diverse homes they sat in front of—and curious portraits of the donors. In the "Nurture" series (2014), Priola continued to explore overlooked aspects of domestic architecture, capturing often-uneasy marriages of modest homes and outdoor vegetation, trouble spots—of overgrowth or stark survival, neglect or ambiguous intention—where flora and human intention collide.

Priola’s "Natural Light" project encompassed exhibitions at Anglim/Trimble (in 2019 and 2023) and his second book, which gathered twelve series spanning over twenty years. Collectively, the various series explore dichotomies of nature and nurture, natural and unnatural, survival and destruction through highly detailed, often dense images of wild or symbiotic (e.g., Parasite, 2017), domestic, dead and synthetic plants. Like Priola's past work, they functioned metaphorically as vehicles to deeper meaning: borrowed houseplants against inky black backgrounds serving as portraits of their owners; surreal foliage arrangements framing central deep black voids to suggest loss; subtly anthropomorphic, ikebana-like compositions of synthetic flowers. Comparing these works to images of bare grey pine tree trunks illuminated against black, Mark Van Proyen wrote, "therein lies the underlying drama of Priola’s new photographs: They reveal the sharp and subtle juxtaposition of dormant and living forms, echoing the split history of photography understood as one of technically codified verisimilitude and another of elegiac evocation."

== Recognition ==
Priola's work belongs to the public art collections of the Art Institute of Chicago, Berkeley Art Museum and Pacific Film Archive, Denver Art Museum, George Eastman Museum, Honolulu Museum of Contemporary Art, Kadist Art Foundation, Los Angeles County Museum of Art, Metropolitan Museum of Art, Museum of Fine Arts, Houston, Museum of Photographic Arts (San Diego), Oakland Museum of California, Philadelphia Museum of Art, and San Francisco Museum of Modern Art. He has received awards and commissions from the Aaron Siskind Foundation, Artadia, California Arts Council, John Anson Kittredge Fund, and Svane Family Foundation.

In addition to Anglim/Trimble Gallery, Priola has exhibited at Fraenkel Gallery (San Francisco), Schneider Gallery (Chicago), Joseph Bellows Gallery (La Jolla, CA), Weston Gallery (Carmel, CA), and Marc Foxx Gallery (Los Angeles).

== Teaching ==
Priola has taught within the International Center of Photography-Bard and Hartford Art School International Limited-Residency master programs and at California College of the Arts, San Francisco State University and the San Francisco Art Institute (SFAI). He was at SFAI from 1996 until its closing in 2022, including service as chair of the photography department and director of the Low Residency MAF Fine Arts Program.
