= Mike Henderson (artist) =

American painter, filmmaker and musician

- Born: June 15, 1943 (age 83); Marshall, Missouri, U.S.
- Education: San Francisco Art Institute (BFA 1969, MFA 1970)
- Known for: Painting, filmmaking
- Movement: Figurative art, Surrealism, Afrofuturism (early work); Abstract expressionism (later work)
- Awards: Guggenheim Fellowship (1973); National Endowment for the Arts Artist Grants (1978, 1989); Artadia Award (2019); Margrit Mondavi Arts Medallion (2022)
- Musical career
- Genre: Blues
- Instrument: Guitar

Mike Henderson (born 1943) is an American painter, filmmaker, musician, and professor emeritus. Based in the San Francisco Bay Area since the mid-1960s, his work spans figurative painting, abstraction, experimental film, and blues music. Henderson is recognized for his early politically charged figurative works addressing social justice and Black life, as well as his later large-scale abstract paintings. He is represented by Haines Gallery, San Francisco.

== Early life and education ==
Michael Henderson was born in Marshall, Missouri, in 1943. In 1965, he moved to the Bay Area to study at the San Francisco Art Institute (SFAI). He earned his Bachelor of Fine Arts (BFA) in 1969, and his Master of Fine Arts (MFA) in 1970 from SFAI. His arrival in San Francisco coincided with a period of significant social and political change, which influenced his early work.

== Art career ==
Henderson's painting practice has evolved significantly over his more than fifty-year career.

=== Early figurative work (1965–1985) ===
The Scream
- The Scream (1966)
- Artist: Mike Henderson
- Year: 1966
- Medium: Oil on canvas, diptych

During his initial decades in San Francisco, Henderson created figurative paintings and films that engaged with themes of social protest, racial violence, and Black identity. His work from this period is noted for its directness and exploration of Afrofuturism and surrealism within the context of Black life and struggle influenced by the activist spirit of the Bay Area in the 1960s and 1970s. Henderson's The Scream (1966), a monumental 10-foot x 12-foot painting depicting three disembodied and conjoined skull-like heads screaming with wide-open, blood-red mouths was born out of his own struggles with the racial injustice in San Francisco to, in his own words, "release a scream that was inside of me". A significant portion of Henderson's output from these first two decades was damaged in a studio fire in 1985.

=== Shift to abstraction ===
Following the studio fire and his earlier figurative period, Henderson increasingly turned towards abstraction. His later paintings are often large-scale and characterized by highly gestural brushwork, complex textures achieved through layering and scraping, and a focus on color, space, and improvisation. This abstract style demonstrates connections to postwar Abstract expressionism while incorporating Henderson's personal experiences and musicality. A notable series from the early 1990s, known as "The Black Paintings," explored a darker palette of blacks, grays, and deep blues, aiming to "express sound within the space of the canvas."

=== Film career ===
Alongside his painting, Henderson produced a body of experimental short films, primarily between the late 1960s and the mid-1980s. Often shot on 16mm film, these works mirrored the political and social concerns of his early paintings, sometimes employing humor and surrealism. His films have been screened at institutions such as the Museum of Modern Art (MoMA), the Whitney Museum of American Art, the Pacific Film Archive, the Centre Pompidou in Paris, and various film festivals.

=== Music ===
Henderson is also an accomplished blues guitarist, dubbed as "the Blues Professor" by John Lee Hooker, and has performed alongside Albert King, Albert Collins, Bo Diddley, James Cotton, and Lightnin’ Hopkins. His interest in music, particularly blues and improvisation, is often cited as an influence on his abstract painting practice and has released three albums on the Pathway label.

=== Teaching career ===
Henderson served as a professor of art at the University of California, Davis for over four decades, joining the faculty around 1970, teaching alongside Wayne Thiebaud, Robert Arneson, Roy De Forest, Manuel Neri and William T. Wiley. He retired in 2012 and holds the title of professor emeritus.

== Style and themes ==
Henderson's oeuvre encompasses politically charged figuration, surrealism, Afrofuturism, and gestural abstraction. Common threads include an engagement with Black experience in America, explorations of social justice, and an improvisational approach potentially linked to his musical background. His abstract work focuses on the formal qualities of paint, texture, color, and space.

== Filmography ==
Filmography
Title	Year(s)	Notes
Money	1970	b/w, sound, 2 min.
The Last Supper	1970/73	color, sound, 8 min.
Dufus	1970/73	b/w, sound, 6 min.
King David	1970/2003	(with Robert Nelson), color, sound, 7.5 min.
Down Hear	1972	b/w, sound, 12 min.
Pitchfork and The Devil	1979	b/w & color, sound, 15 min.
The Shape of Things	1981	b/w & color, sound, 8 min.
Too Late to Stop Down Now	1982	16mm, b/w, sound, 4 min.
How to Beat a Dead Horse	1983	b/w & color, sound, 7.5 min.
Just Another Notion	1983	color, sound, 3 min.
When & Where	1984	16mm, b/w, sound, 4 min.

== Exhibitions and collections ==
Henderson's work has been exhibited widely in solo and group shows since the 1960s. Key exhibitions include:

- 2023, Mike Henderson: Before the Fire, 1965–1985, his first major museum retrospective, at the Jan Shrem and Maria Manetti Shrem Museum of Art, UC Davis.
- 2023, Chicken Fingers, 1976–1980 at Haines Gallery, San Francisco.
- 2020, The Black Paintings at Haines Gallery, San Francisco.
- 2019–2020, Inclusion in Soul of a Nation: Art in the Age of Black Power 1963–1983, shown at the de Young Museum, San Francisco and other venues.

His work is held in the permanent collections of numerous museums, including:

- Crocker Art Museum, Sacramento
- Fine Arts Museums of San Francisco (de Young Museum)
- Jan Shrem and Maria Manetti Shrem Museum of Art, UC Davis
- Museum of Modern Art (MoMA), New York
- Oakland Museum of California
- Phoenix Art Museum
- San Francisco Museum of Modern Art (SFMOMA)
- Studio Museum in Harlem, New York
- Whitney Museum of American Art, New York

== Awards and recognition ==
Henderson has received several awards, including:

- Guggenheim Fellowship (1973)
- National Endowment for the Arts (NEA) Artist Grants (1978, 1989)
- Artadia San Francisco Award (2019)
- Margrit Mondavi Arts Medallion (2022)
