= M. Louise Stanley =

American figurative painter

- Born: 1942 (age 83–84); Charleston, West Virginia, United States
- Education: California College of the Arts, La Verne College
- Known for: Painting, sculpture, assemblage
- Awards: Guggenheim Fellowship, Pollock-Krasner Foundation, Adolph and Esther Gottlieb Foundation, National Endowment for the Arts
- Website: M. Louise Stanley

M. Louise Stanley, The Anatomy Lesson, acrylic on canvas, 72" x 96", 2003.

M. Louise Stanley (born 1942) is an American painter, known for irreverent figurative work that combines myth and allegory, satire, autobiography, and social commentary. Writers such as curator Renny Pritikin situate her early-1970s work at the forefront of the "small, but potent" Bad Painting movement, so named for its "disregard for the niceties of conventional figurative painting." Stanley's paintings frequently focus on romantic fantasies and conflicts, social manners and taboos, gender politics, and lampoons of classical myths, portrayed through stylized figures, expressive color, frenetic compositions and slapstick humor. Art historians such as Whitney Chadwick place Stanley within a Bay Area narrative tradition that blended eclectic sources and personal styles in revolt against mid-century modernism; her work includes a feminist critique of contemporary life and art springing from personal experience and her early membership in the Women's Movement. Stanley has been awarded a Guggenheim Fellowship and grants from the Pollock-Krasner Foundation, Adolph and Esther Gottlieb Foundation, and National Endowment for the Arts. Her work has been shown at institutions including PS1, San Francisco Museum of Modern Art (SFMOMA), The New Museum and Long Beach Museum of Art, and belongs to public collections including SFMOMA, San Jose Museum of Art, Oakland Museum, and de Saisset Museum. Stanley lives and works in Emeryville, California.

== Early life and career ==
M. Louise Stanley was born in Charleston, West Virginia in 1942, and grew up in South Pasadena, California. Her parents, William ("Bill") and Marie Stanley, both children of missionary parents, first met in China as teenagers. After their families later re-settled in the United States, they reunited, married, and had three children, Louise, Susan and Alfred; Bill became an analytical chemist, and Marie, a chemical laboratory technician. Louise took an early interest in classical art and illuminated manuscripts (including the Gutenberg Bible) through visits to the nearby Huntington Library. She learned to paint alongside her father, who was an accomplished watercolorist, and in his retirement, a violin-maker.

Stanley attended the conservative, Brethren La Verne College (BA, 1964), supplementing her studies by motor-scootering to Scripps College for life drawing classes. In 1965, she moved to the Bay Area and enrolled at California College of Arts and Crafts (BFA, 1967; MFA, 1969), where she found a like-minded community. She studied with Peter Saul and was influenced by H. C. Westermann and sources such as Outsider art, underground comics, and the Alameda flea market. In the early 1970s, she was one of the early Bay Area artists to join the emerging Woman's Movement, along with Judith Linhares; their organized group of women artists took part in several gender-focused exhibitions that helped to establish the legitimacy of personal, narrative-based and feminist work.

In the 1970s and 1980s, Stanley began teaching, lecturing and exhibiting across the country, including solo shows at PS1 and Women's Interart Center (New York) and Matrix Gallery (UC Berkeley), the Rena Bransten and Quay galleries (San Francisco), and Santa Barbara Contemporary Arts Forum; she also appeared in group exhibitions at the San Francisco Art Institute, Newport Harbor Museum, The New Museum and Fashion Moda (New York), de Saisset Museum, Long Beach Museum of Art, SFMOMA, and Artists Space (1988), among others. Her first trips to Italy in the 1980s inspired new classical elements in her work, as did her personally conducted "Art Lover's Tours" to Europe, which began in 1994 and numbered fourteen in total.

In subsequent years, in addition to gallery shows, Stanley has received retrospectives at the SFMOMA Artist's Gallery (1999) and Dominican University (2007) and solo shows at the Richmond Art Center, Kala Art Institute (2019), and MarinMOCA (2021); she has participated in major group shows at The Drawing Center, San Jose Museum of Art and Oakland Museum, among others. She is represented by Anglim/Trimble in San Francisco.

M. Louise Stanley, The Mystic Muse and the Bums Who Sleep on the Golf Course Behind the Oakland Cemetery, watercolor, 11" x 15", 1970.

== Work and reception ==
Writers characterize Stanley as "a socially and politically engaged satirist" in the tradition of history painting, whose work documents the human condition, modern-day romance, and contemporary social issues using humor, allegory, myth and idiosyncratic, expressive figuration. She emerged amid a 1960s Bay Area art scene that reacted against Abstract Expressionism, Minimalism and the disengagement of Pop art by embracing eclectic and "low-brow" influences—Bay Area funk and figuration, surrealism, Chicago's Monster Roster, urban street life, comics and popular media—to create socially engaged narrative work. For Stanley and many others, the Women's Movement was equally influential, stimulating consciousness-raising and the development of forms of expression based on personal imagery, experiences and feelings; in the later 1970s several of these women (Stanley included) were associated with the "Bad Painting" movement, noted for its rejection of "good taste," social taboos and obviously displayed skill.

=== Early figurative satires (1970–9) ===
Stanley dubbed the iconoclastic, tongue-in-cheek style of her early work "junior high realism," pointing up its affinity with irreverent notebook-doodle caricature and preference for emotional and observational truth over realism. She painted satires of polite-society formality and American lifestyles, bawdy barroom vignettes, sexually charged domestic scenes and fantastical moments of oddball horror (e.g., Rust's Wedding, 1971). They expressed both private feelings, fears and fantasies and her politicized feminist consciousness—often through powerfully assertive, "brassy" 1930s-1940s-styled women that critics likened to Benton or Reginald Marsh figures, like those in her works The Mystic Muse and the Bums Who Sleep on the Golf Course Behind the Oakland Cemetery (1970) and Barroom Brawl (1977).

Reviews noted Stanley's elongated, swan-necked figuration, expressive draftsmanship, tilted compositions and electric colors, and watercolor mastery; Artforum critic Peter Plagens described it as attaining "a clumsy luminosity reminiscent of Marsden Hartley or John Kane," while the San Francisco Chronicle's Thomas Albright deemed it the "Bay Region's answer to Chicago's Hairy Who." During this time, Stanley often showed in pointedly gender-oriented exhibitions or groupings: a section of "Paintings on Paper" (San Francisco Art Institute, 1971), "Touching All Things" (Civic Art Center, Walnut Creek, 1977) and "Her Story" (Oakland Museum, 1991); these shows were sometimes appreciated for their then-novel exploration of inner life and sexual politics, and other times misunderstood or dismissed as "suburban," dilettantish, even sexist by largely male reviewers.

M. Louise Stanley, Melancolia (after Durer), acrylic on canvas, 80" x 62", 2012.

=== Classical and contemporary allegories ===
In the early 1980s, Stanley introduced two new elements into her work: travel-inspired classical motifs that she mixed with contemporary themes and situations, and a Zelig or Where's Wally-like alter ego she called the "Archetypal Artist," who metamorphosed into various contemporary and mythical roles, clad in a red-and-white striped shirt and green Capri pants. The classical influence included Rococo oil brushwork and chiaroscuro modeling, mural-sized canvasses, elaborate faux-gilded, trompe-l'oeil proscenia and frames (e.g., Anatomy Lesson, 2003) and Pompeiian or French-baroque room installations with pedestals and papier-mâché Greek vases. Stanley's signature slapstick humor, expressiveness and formal characteristics remained, now employed in increasingly detail-packed parodies and farcical melodramas of women confronting romantic conflicts, fantasies and fears, and social taboos. Critic David Winter likened their wit to English caricaturists such as Hogarth, James Gillray and Thomas Rowlandson, but "seasoned" with the authentically American influences of 1930s Realism and Mad Magazine zaniness.

Stanley used mythological elements (in works such as Cupid Chastised or the Morning After or Leda and the Swan) to both flesh out her modern dramas and evoke the irrational, while camouflaging the personal; her humor functioned to demystify myths, puncture art-world seriousness, and balance darker psychological themes. Art in America critic David S. Rubin wrote that Stanley's colorful worlds, ironic situations and Disneyesque characters (Athena, Adonis, nymph, cupid and satyr figures) both seduce and "bring us face-to-face with serious content"; he and others compare her visual strategies to those of painter Robert Colescott.

M. Louise Stanley, Outside Interference, gouache on paper, 26" x 40" 1988.

In contemporary scenes, Stanley chronicles romance, friendship, and art-world experiences; Artweek's Cathy Curtis described them as "the art world's answer to Dorothy Parker, Erma Bombeck, and Erica Jong." In Sacred and Profane Love (1982) and All That Glitters Is Not Gold (1988), women confront romantic predicaments: fighting to redirect her man's attention from a nearby nude statue, or in the latter, women's fruitless curiosity about men. Curator Susan Landauer suggests Stanley's work often carries a "mischievous confessional irony," achieved by inserting an alter ego that reviewers describe as an ideal woman as envisioned by junior-high teen steeped in 1950s daytime television, Archie Comics and Seventeen magazine. Jupiter and Io (1981) and Pygmaliana (1985) offer sexual fantasies—the alter ego cavorting with lusty gods or spirits sprung to life from mid-air or paintings—while Outside Interference (1988) shows her violently kicking in her television. In other cases, she confronts artistic crises and scenarios: bravely wielding palette and brush to confront her own enormous, Athena-shaped shadow (A Painting of Courage, 1991), solitarily smoking on a bed in Van Gogh's famed bedroom, facing male critics (Judgment of Paris, 2005), or attempting to cheer up Durer’s sad-faced angel in Melancolia (after Dürer) (2012).

M. Louise Stanley, Truncis Naribus (Faces Without Noses), acrylic on canvas, 36" x 44", 2014.

=== Later history paintings and sketchbooks ===
Stanley's later work increasingly followed in the tradition of history painting, documenting contemporary issues and follies through large-scale, elaborately coded allegories. San Francisco Chronicle critic Charles Desmarais describes them as displaying "an antic intelligence and a loose style ... at [its] best when humorously sending up classical subjects and Old Master concerns" (e.g., Truncis Naribus (Faces Without Noses), 2014). They include skewerings of male folly (Midas, 1997, which depicts the king touching something he shouldn't have), and female foibles (her 1999 restaging of the Seven Deadly Sins in a women's restroom). Other works, however, were more psychologically subtle, their humor submerged in favor of more pointed, unflinching social commentary and somber humanism addressing homelessness (20th Century Genre, 1994), tragedy and grief (Memento Mori (After Columbine, 1999), and abuse of power (Bad Bankers, 2011), that Artweek compared to the satires of Daumier.

Stanley's closely guarded sketchbooks, long a key resource of ideas and studies anchoring her paintings, came to the fore in two solo exhibitions; nearly thirty were shown alongside her paintings at Dominican University (2007), while the survey "Faces Without Noses" (Richmond Art Center, 2019) was primarily dedicated to them. Curator Renny Pritikin describes the sketchbooks as "highly skilled and frequently wildly satiric" volumes full of "visual morsels devoured during her frequent trips to European museums"; Artweek suggested that they offer less filtered and processed forms of her "relentless pursuit" of old-master draftsmanship, painting techniques and pictorial challenges.

== Awards and public collections ==
Stanley has been recognized with a Guggenheim Fellowship (2015) and grants for painting from the Pollock-Krasner Foundation (2014), Adolph and Esther Gottlieb Foundation (2005, 1997) and the National Endowment for the Arts (1989, 1982); she has received grants from Change, Inc. (2001) and the Fleishhacker Foundation (Eureka Grant, 1987) and a Djerassi Artists Residency (1989). Stanley was also awarded a public art commission from her hometown of Emeryville to create Neighborhood Convergence (2004), a collaboration with sculptor Vickie Joe Sowell and lighting designer Jeremy Hamm that placed towering, wildly colorful steel characters based on Stanley's caricatures inside a local underpass.

Stanley's work belongs to the public collections of the SFMOMA, San Jose Museum of Art, Oakland Museum, de Saisset Museum, Mills College, The Pilot Hill Collection of Contemporary Art, Santa Clara University, Santa Cruz Museum of Art and History, Triton Museum of Art, and Yale University, among others.
