= Anglim Trimble Gallery =

American art gallery

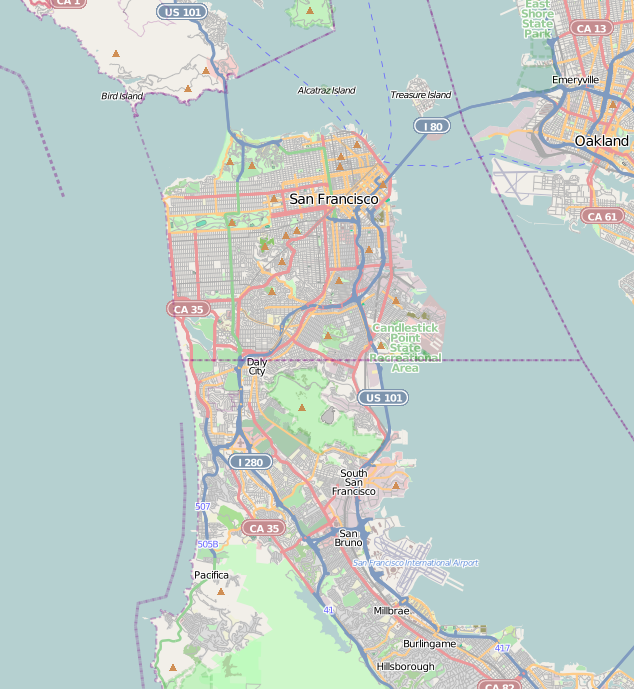
- Location of Minnesota Street Project
- Location: 1275 Minnesota Street, San Francisco, California 94107, U.S.
- Coordinates: 37.7543°N 122.3894°W
- Director: Shannon Trimble
- Website: www.anglimtrimble.com

Anglim Trimble Gallery, formerly Gallery Paule Anglim, and Anglim Gilbert Gallery, is a contemporary commercial art gallery which is located at Minnesota Street Project, 1275 Minnesota Street, San Francisco, California The gallery was founded by Paule Anglim (1923 –2015) in the early 1970s.

The gallery specializes in exhibiting works from West Coast art movements. Following Anglim's passing in the spring of 2015, the gallery was re-opened under the lead of her long-term director, Ed Gilbert, and renamed Anglim Gilbert Gallery. After the death of Gilbert in 2020, it was subsequently renamed Anglim Trimble Gallery under the directorship of Shannon Trimble. The gallery has been located at the Minnesota Street Project since spring of 2016.

== Movements ==
- California Beat artists
- Bay Area Conceptualists
- Experimental California art movements

== Artists ==
- Terry Allen
- Anne Appleby
- Robert Bechtle
- John Beech
- Nayland Blake
- Louise Bourgeois
- Joan Brown
- John Buck
- Bull.Miletic
- Deborah Butterfield
- Dean Byington
- Jerome Caja
- Carter
- James Castle
- Enrique Chagoya
- Anne Chu
- Travis Collinson
- Bruce Conner
- Jean Conner
- Eleanor Coppola
- Nathaniel Dorsky
- Ala Ebtekar
- Bruno Fazzolari
- Vincent Fecteau
- Louise Fishman
- Terry Fox
- Ann Hamilton
- David Hannah
- Lynn Hershman Leeson
- Mildred Howard
- David Ireland
- Colter Jacobsen
- Jess
- Paul Kos
- Tony Labat
- Judith Linhares
- Tom Marioni
- Andrew Masullo
- Barry McGee
- Jim Melchert
- Ruby Neri
- Tony Oursler
- Gay Outlaw
- Hung-Chih Peng
- J. John Priola
- Rigo 23
- Clare Rojas
- Annabeth Rosen
- John Roloff
- Richard Shaw
- Katherine Sherwood
- Dean Smith
- M. Louise Stanley
- Frances Stark
- Oriane Stender
- Christine Streuli
- Robert Stone
- Canan Tolon
- William Tucker
- Catherine Wagner
- Carrie Mae Weems
- Pamela Helena Wilson
- Xiaoze Xie
- John Zurier
- Tomas Nakada
