= Neil Jenney =

American painter

- Born: November 6, 1945 (age 80); Torrington
- Style: Bad Painting

Neil Jenney is an American painter and sculptor born on November 6, 1945, in Torrington, Connecticut, and living and working in his own gallery New York City that he restored himself.

He attended Massachusetts College of Art from 1964 to 1966. In 1966 he moved to New York City, where he continues to reside. He initially worked as a taxicab driver, and scrounged some of his art materials from dumpsters. His early artwork focused on interior environmental sculpture, but he found that his paintings were more successful in generating sufficient income.

He initially painted mostly with acrylics in a deliberately crude style, but soon taught himself to do more-refined oil painting on wood panels; more recently, he has used canvas for his larger works. Since 1969, the artist has emphasized framing of his artwork, with various types of physical frames or with painted frames. He is interested in both the symbolic and physical framing of his artworks. His paintings often feature a stark dark-colored frame, with a stenciled title of the work.

In 1978, his painting style was described by art critic Marcia Tucker as "Bad Painting", a description which he has embraced. Jenney describes his style as "realism", but it is an idiosyncratic use of the word on his part, meaning "a style in which narrative truths are found in the simple relationships of objects". That same year, he was awarded a Guggenheim Fellowship for Fine Arts.

His body of work during 1969–1970, which is the period for which he was first known, was a reaction to minimalism and photo-realism. The work's impact was large for such a brief period: according to New York Times art critic Roberta Smith "in those two years Mr. Jenney helped put representational painting on a new course and established precedents for the art of the 1970s, 80s and 90s".

Often, Jenney's work of this period depicted pairs of objects which had evocative cause and effect relationships (such as a saw and a piece of cut wood, as are depicted in the 1969 piece Sawn and Saw). In an April 15, 2001, review in the New York Observer of his show of work from the late 60s and early 70s at Gagosian Gallery, Mario Naves said that the paintings:

"...aren't really bad at least not bad bad. That pejorative adjective, in Mr. Jenney's case, comes with scare quotes a mile high and connotes an art that combines the dead-end figuration of Pop, the dead-end materiality of Minimalism and a sense of humor that is, if not dead-end, then sharply deadpan. Mr. Jenney painted the pictures during the heyday of Conceptual Art, and if they were, in part, a rebuff to its disembodied verities, they also partook of its intellectual detachment."

His painting Here and There (1969), which depicts a white fence dividing a field of drippy, green brushstrokes, was in the 2004 exhibition The Undiscovered Country at the Hammer Museum in Los Angeles.

His painting Meltdown Morning (1975) is in the permanent collection of the Philadelphia Museum of Art. The artwork measures 25 by 112 inches (64 by 284 cm), and presents a horizontal slit-like closeup view of a tree trunk with a few delicate leaves. In the far background is a mushroom cloud depicted in pastel pink, purple, and gold. About half of the surface of the panel is devoted to a black frame box, boldly stating the title of the work.

Jenney's artworks have often had an environmental theme, commenting on pollution, militarism, and other environmental threats. His more recent work has focused on landscapes and tropical vegetation.

Jenney's work is in many museums, including the Museum of Modern Art, The Metropolitan Museum of Art, and the Whitney Museum of American Art. He shows with Gagosian, the Alan Brown Gallery, and the Barbara Mathes Gallery.

== Sources ==
- Ausstellungskatalog: documenta 5. Befragung der Realität – Bildwelten heute; Katalog (als Aktenordner) Band 1: (Material); Band 2: (Exponatliste); Kassel 1972
- documenta Archiv (Hrsg.); Wiedervorlage d5 – Eine Befragung des Archivs zur documenta 1972; Kassel/Ostfildern 2001, ISBN 3-7757-1121-X
