= Bull.Miletic =

American artists

- Education: San Francisco Art Institute, University of Oslo, Norwegian University of Science and Technology
- Notable work: Heaven Can Wait, Ferriscope, Zoom Blue Dot
- Style: Contemporary art, Video art, Video installation
- Awards: 23rd Excellence Award, Japan Media Arts Festival; The Bay Area Award, New Langton Arts; Video Maker Award, Bay Area Video Coalition; The Norwegian Video Award, Oslo Screen Festival
- Website: bull.miletic.info

Bull.Miletic is a collaborative visual arts duo, created by Synne T. Bull (Norwegian, born 1973) and Dragan Miletic (American, born Yugoslavia 1970). They are principally known for their video installation artworks and contributions in the fields of media archaeology, new media, and history of film.

== Short biography ==
Bull and Miletic met at San Francisco Art Institute where they began to work as Bull.Miletic in 2000.

Since 2005, Bull.Miletic's work has been represented by Anglim Gilbert Gallery. They currently live and work in Oslo, Norway.

== Exhibitions ==
Bull.Miletic have shown internationally at venues including Japan Media Arts Festival, Venice Biennale, California Biennial, WRO Media Art Biennale, Trondheim Kunstmuseum, Yerba Buena Center for the Arts, San Francisco, German Architecture Museum, Frankfurt, Künstlerhaus Bethanien, Berlin, Pasadena Museum of California Art, Pacific Film Archive, Berkeley, Ulrich Museum of Art, Wichita, Henie Onstad Art Center, Høvikodden, and Museum of Contemporary Art, Belgrade. Their work has been reviewed in Artforum, Aftenposten, Billedkunst, Kunstkritikk, Mousse Magazine, San Francisco Chronicle, and Rhizome among others.

== Recognition ==
Bull.Miletic were the recipients of the Excellence Award at the Japan Media Arts Festival, Video Maker Award at the Bay Area Video Coalition, Best Norwegian Video Award at the Oslo Screen Festival and have received professional grants from the San Francisco Arts Commission, Arts Council Norway, Nordic Institute for Contemporary Art, Office for Contemporary Art Norway and CEC ArtsLink among others. They lectured in programs such as Art, Technology, and Culture Lecture Series at the University of California, Berkeley in 2011, SCMS Annual Conference 2013 Chicago and Arts + Design Mondays at Berkeley Art Museum and Pacific Film Archive in 2017. Their work has been nominated for the Rockefeller Media Art Award as well as San Francisco Museum of Modern Art's SECA Art Award. They were artists in residence at the Headlands Center for the Arts in 2003, at Künstlerhause Bethanien Berlin in 2004, at Nordic Artists’ Center Dale in 2006, and at the Cité internationale des arts in Paris in 2007. In 2012, they were Visiting Artists at the Cinema and Media Studies, University of Chicago and in 2017, Bull.Miletic were inaugural Art + Science Artists-in-Residence at University of California, Berkeley.

== Related activities ==
Bull.Miletic initiated and curated several exhibitions including Net.Film in New York. In 2010, they co-organized Urban Images symposium at Oslo National Academy of the Arts. In 2012, they were part of the art research project "re:place" in association with Bergen Academy of Art and Design, Oslo National Academy of the Arts and The Grieg Academy, which culminated in the survey exhibition This Must be the Place.

== Public collections ==
- Whitney Museum of American Art
- National Museum of Art, Architecture and Design
- Museum of Contemporary Art, Belgrade
- San Francisco Art Institute
- Lørenskog kulturhus, Norway

== Publications ==
- "Urban Images: Unruly Desires in Film and Architecture," edited by Synne Bull and Marit Paasche. Berlin: Sternberg Press, 2011. OCLC 793371926
- "Cities Reimagined," edited by Bull.Miletic. Novi Sad: Museum of Contemporary Art Vojvodina, 2010. ISBN 978-86-84773-68-7
- "Unfinished: Scars of the Past / Face of the Future," edited by Bull.Miletic. Belgrade: Museum of Contemporary Art, 2007. OCLC 271570720
- "Bull.Miletic: Slow Seeing," edited by Bull.Miletic. Berlin: Künstlerhaus Bethanien, 2004. OCLC 75278677
- "Bull.Miletic: The Island of Pelicans," edited by Bull.Miletic. Montréal: Centre d'exposition Circa, 2003. OCLC 948718104
