= Judith Linhares =

American painter (born 1940)

- Born: 1940 (age 85–86); Pasadena, California, US
- Education: California College of the Arts
- Known for: Painting, Drawing, Printmaking
- Style: Figurative, Expressionist, Feminist
- Website: Judith Linhares

Judith Linhares (born 1940) is an American painter, known for her vibrant, expressive figurative and narrative paintings. She came of age and gained recognition in the Bay Area culture of the 1960s and 1970s and has been based in New York City since 1980. Curator Marcia Tucker featured her in the influential New Museum show, "'Bad' Painting" (1978), and in the 1984 Venice Biennale show, "Paradise Lost/Paradise Regained: American Visions of the New Decade." Linhares synthesizes influences including Expressionism, Bay Area Figuration, Mexican modern art and second-wave feminism, in work that flirts with abstraction and balances visionary personal imagery, expressive intensity, and pictorial rigor. Art historian Whitney Chadwick wrote, "Linhares is an artist for whom painting has always mattered as the surest path of synthesizing experience and interior life," her works "emerging as if by magic from an alchemical stew of vivid complementary hues and muted tonalities." Critic John Yau describes her paintings "funny, strange, and disconcerting," while writer Susan Morgan called them "unexpected and indelible" images exploring "an oddly sublime territory where exuberant bliss remains inseparable from ominous danger."

Judith Linhares, Wave, 60" x 84", oil on linen, 2010.

Linhares has been recognized with more than forty-five one-person exhibitions, major awards from the American Academy of Arts and Letters and John Simon Guggenheim Memorial Foundation, among many, and acquisitions by numerous public collections. Critics, such as The New York Times' Ken Johnson identify her as a key forerunner to and influence on several waves of younger figurative artists. Jennifer Riley wrote, "Linhares has practically invented the genre of imaginative figure painting largely populated by confident women engaged in activities ranging from the banal to the idiosyncratic, thus paving the way for artists such as Amy Cutler, Hilary Harkness, and Dana Schutz." Linhares is represented by Various Small Fires (Los Angeles), P.P.O.W. Gallery (New York) and Anglim Gilbert Gallery (San Francisco). She lives and works in Brooklyn, New York.

== Life and career ==
Judith Linhares, Love Letters from San Jose, "At Home in San Jose" series, ink on paper, 28"x 34", 1971.

Linhares was born in Pasadena, California in 1940. She began as an artist in her teens, hanging out in the beatnik world of Malibu Beach. In 1958, she moved to Oakland to attend California College of the Arts (CCA), where she earned an BFA (1964) and MFA (1970). Linhares was active in a vibrant Bay Area culture that embraced second-wave feminism, the hippie scene, underground comic artists S. Clay Wilson and Robert Crumb, assemblage artists Wallace Berman and Bruce Conner, and Funk and Outsider art; those influences turned her in a more populist direction, from abstraction toward figurative and narrative art.

After CCA, Linhares lived in San Francisco, taught art at area colleges, and exhibited at venues such as the San Francisco Museum of Modern Art. In 1975, the San Francisco Art Institute recognized her with the Adaline Kent Award for promising California artists. In 1978, she received the first of three National Endowment for the Arts grants, and was included in Marcia Tucker's seminal New Museum exhibition, "'Bad' Painting," which brought her wider recognition as an avatar of a nascent Neo-Expressionist figurative turn in art. In 1980, she moved to New York City, continuing to exhibit on both coasts. In subsequent years, Linhares has taught extensively, notably at the School of Visual Arts (1980–2014) and New York University (1986–2006), and exhibited throughout the U.S., including major shows at Edward Thorp Gallery (New York) and Gallery Paule Anglim (San Francisco). Retrospectives of her work have been held at Sonoma State University and the Greenville County Museum of Art ("Dangerous Pleasures," 1994).

== Work ==
Critics identify several enduring characteristics in Linhares's work, even as it has evolved considerably over five decades. One is her intense commitment to art as a process of self-discovery through which she synthesizes personal experience and, more broadly, female subjectivity. Those impulses fuel her visionary imagery and expressive color and brushwork, which sit in tension with an equally formidable commitment to the Gestalt of pictorial integrity and sharp economy of means. In Linhares's "Dangerous Pleasures" retrospective (1994) catalogue, critic Brooke Adams called her work a "strange, luminous, hard-won pictorial universe." In 2006, Los Angeles Times critic David Pagel wrote, "This give and take—between singular, iconic image and scattershot, freewheeling chaos—endows Linhares's art with moxy and verve."

Linhares's ability to reconcile these tensions derives from her absorption of a dizzying array of traditions—from Symbolism to Abstract Expressionism to California Funk—whose strategies she turns to her own idiosyncratic aims. Adams called her "a vanguardist in the reassessment of Mexican influence and spirit in modern art." Pagel wrote that her work revisits German Expressionism, "recuperating its original animal innocence (and playful verve)," sans the recent layers of irony, aggression and bombast added by various Neo-Expressionisms. Linhares cites expressionists Max Beckmann, James Ensor and Edvard Munch, artists negotiating "the line between figuration and abstraction" such as David Park and Bob Thompson, and surrealists Remedios Varo and Toyen, who depicted powerful, sexual women, as key inspirations. In light of the complex welter of influences, critics consistently note Linhares's "evocative magic act" of pulling off work that appears deceptively nonchalant, breezy, and improvisational in its "easy virtuosity."

Judith Linhares, Turkey, 64"x 60", oil on linen, 1977.

=== Early work ===
In the early 1970s, Linhares created narrative drawings and assemblages that appropriated commonplace or "craft" materials and feminine imagery (flowers, eggs, swan feathers, domestic scenes), pushing back against passé notions of "women's art." Her "At Home in San Jose" drawing series was noted for startling, often humorous, imagery developed through introspection, which juxtaposed skeletons, devils and women in scenes of cozy domesticity or macabre religio-erotic fantasies. San Francisco critic Alfred Frankenstein recognized them most for their "meticulous draftsmanship" and elegant design sense, calling her a successor to renowned Mexican printmaker José Guadalupe Posada"; others compared their spiky, linearity and ghostly imagery to the work of Aubrey Beardsley.

=== Figurative painting: 1976–1999 ===
Linhares and critics, such as Dan Cameron, mark a four-month sojourn in Guanajuato, Mexico in 1976 as a turning point that refocused her on painting and integrated her subconscious imagery, painterly and narrative impulses, and Jungian, Surrealist, and Mexican and Outsider Art influences. This evolution was perhaps first realized in the 1977 painting Turkey (featured in the "'Bad' Painting" show), which fused archetypal forces in an uncanny, iconic image.

Judith Linhares, Woman with Beautiful Hair, 40"x 40", gouache on paper, 1985.

After her move to New York in 1980, Linhares's style and mastery of painting—particularly in gouache—gained momentum. She developed a Symbolist allegorical world of enigmatic, bulbous-headed creatures, narcoleptic nudes, phantasms, figures in boats, and human metamorphosis, invoking dreams, myths and fairy-tales and existential, romantic and spiritual themes. Her fantastic imagery was balanced by lush color, painterly sensual surfaces, and sure design, which critics maintained gave her vision its impact. In paintings such as Woman with Beautiful Hair (1985) or The Beekeeper's Daughter (1990), Linhares began to focus more on single, usually female, figures in illusionistic space. Through the 1990s, critics noted in her work a sunnier palette, increasingly abstract and ambiguous imagery, and a growing facility with a naïve drawing style that recalled the late work of Phillip Guston.

=== Post-2000: pastoral nudes and still lifes ===
In the 2000s, Linhares has turned to female nudes (often monumental), visionary landscapes, floral still lifes (e.g., Star Vase, 2003), and animals. Critic Roberta Smith called the work her most assured, while others suggested that Linhares breathed new life into seemingly exhausted genres. These "deftly messy images of carefree, meaty stick figures" and "fantastical tableaux" depict nude (or more aptly, nudist) women set against candy-striped skies and terrain—often free of men—picnicking, communing and working in a languid ease that suggests a lightly worn, but confident feminism. John Yau described them as investigations of an alternative world, "Eden before the arrival of Adam and the snake." Painted in bright Fauvist colors that critics described as juicy, madcap, and almost edible, with blocky, charged, gestural brushstrokes, the paintings seemed to re-imagine de Kooning's violent nudes in an act of identification with the figures.

Judith Linhares, Star Vase, 22" x 26", oil on linen, 2003.

In late works, from Starlight (2005) to Wave (2010, top) to Dig (2017), Linhares's commitment to the primacy of composition came to the fore, as she pushed the limits of representation, perspective and coherence. Writer Madison Smartt Bell (among many) identified "a solid integrity of composition that few latter-day figurative painters can rival, which he credited to Linhares's deep-rooted habit of beginning paintings with abstract fields of color, out of which she gradually pulls her subject. Others have described her paintings as "single-image novellas" that "read with power and immediacy the way the great abstract paintings do." Reviewing the 2006 show, "Rowing in Eden," Jennifer Riley wrote, "Shapes, figures, and colors are arranged like characters on a stage and painted with a deftness that makes this difficult-to-achieve work appear effortless."

In 2019, Linhares appeared in the Boston Museum of Fine Arts exhibition "Contemporary Art: Five Propositions" and had a solo show, "Hearts on Fire," at P.P.O.W. Reviewers noted that these later paintings—flowers, animals and nudes in landscapes emerging from bands of abstract color—created a fairy tale world that followed an internal logic and sense of randomness all its own. They described the work, High Desert (2018), for example, as a brightly colored, visionary riff on Henri Rousseau’s The Sleeping Gypsy, whose composition included a nude reclining on a crocheted, patchwork blanket, a watchful lion, and a Technicolor sky likened to "a deconstructed Sol LeWitt wall drawing." The Sarasota Museum of Art exhibition "Judith Linhares: The Artist as Curator" (2021) considered the intuitive process and creative inspirations shaping Linhares's practice, with a range of her own paintings, items from her studio including collected objects, photographs and journals, and works by five artists: Bill Adams, Ellen Berkenblit, Karin Davie, Dona Nelson and Mary Jo Vath.

== Recognition and collections ==
Linhares has been recognized with awards from the Artists' Legacy Foundation (2017), Joan Mitchell Foundation (2013), American Academy of Arts and Letters (2008), Pollock-Krasner Foundation (2000), Anonymous Was a Woman (1999), Guggenheim Foundation (1997), Adolph and Esther Gottlieb Foundation (1993), and National Endowment for the Arts (1993, 1987, 1979). Her work sits in numerous public collections, including the Whitney Museum of American Art, Smithsonian American Art Museum, San Francisco Museum of Modern Art, de Young Museum, San Jose Museum of Art, Berkeley Art Museum, Oakland Museum, Crocker Art Museum, Zimmerli Art Museum, Weisman Art Museum, Weatherspoon Art Museum, and New Britain Museum of American Art, among many.
