= Gay Outlaw =

American artist

- Born: 1959; Mobile, Alabama, United States
- Education: International Center of Photography; École de Cuisine La Varenne
- Alma mater: University of Virginia
- Awards: SECA Art Award
- Website: https://www.gayoutlaw.com/

Gay Outlaw (born 1959) is an American artist working in sculpture, photography and printmaking. She is known for her "rigorous and unexpected explorations of material". She is based in San Francisco, California.

== Early life and education ==
Gay Outlaw was born in 1959 in Mobile, Alabama to Arthur R. and Dorothy (Smith) Outlaw. She received her BA in French from the University of Virginia in 1981. She studied pastry from 1981 until 1982 at the École de Cuisine La Varenne, a cooking school in Paris. After Paris, she moved to New York and took classes at the International Center for Photography between 1987-1988.

== Work ==
Outlaw's early work was made of perishable items such as pastry and caramels. In 1995, she created a 34-foot-long wall of fruitcake bricks and installed it at Yerba Buena Gardens in San Francisco. She embraces the transformations that occur with these time sensitive mediums, challenging people's expectations of sculpture being stable. Outlaw's recent work includes assemblages with her photographs and cast glass sculptures she calls "puddles".

When asked the meaning of her work, Outlaw said, "The message is no message. I call it formal free association".

Outlaw continually explores duality in her work, for example, interior and exterior, or solids and voids. One of her notable pieces, Black Hose Mountain, is a huge sculpture consisting of black hoses filled with plaster.

Outlaw is represented by Gallery Anglim Gilbert in San Francisco.

== Selected exhibitions ==
=== Solo exhibitions ===
1990 – The Friends of Photography at the Ansel Adams Center, San Francisco, California

1996 – “New Pictures and Sculpture,” Refusalon, San Francisco, CA and Littlejohn Contemporary Art, New York, New York

1998 – SFMoMA's SECA Art Award Exhibition, San Francisco Museum of Modern Art, San Francisco, California

2003 – “New Work by Gay Outlaw,” University of Virginia Art Museum, Charlottesville, Virginia

2004 – “Impermeable,” Gallery Paule Anglim, San Francisco, California

2005 – “Three-legged Inversions,” Mills College Art Museum, Oakland, California

2007–2008 – “Gay Outlaw: Recent Work,” Gatehouse Gallery, di Rosa Preserve, Napa, California

2009 – “Gay Outlaw: New Sculpture,” Gallery Paule Anglim, San Francisco, California

2011 – “Gay Outlaw: The Velocity of Ideas,” Center for Contemporary Art, Sacramento, California

2012 – "New Work, Gallery Paule Anglim, San Francisco, California.

2014 – "Home", Gallery Paule Anglim, San Francisco, California.

2016–2017 – "Mutable Object", Jordan Schnitzer Museum of Art at the University of Oregon, Eugene, Oregon
