= Ala Ebtekar =

American painter (born 1978)

- علا ابتکار
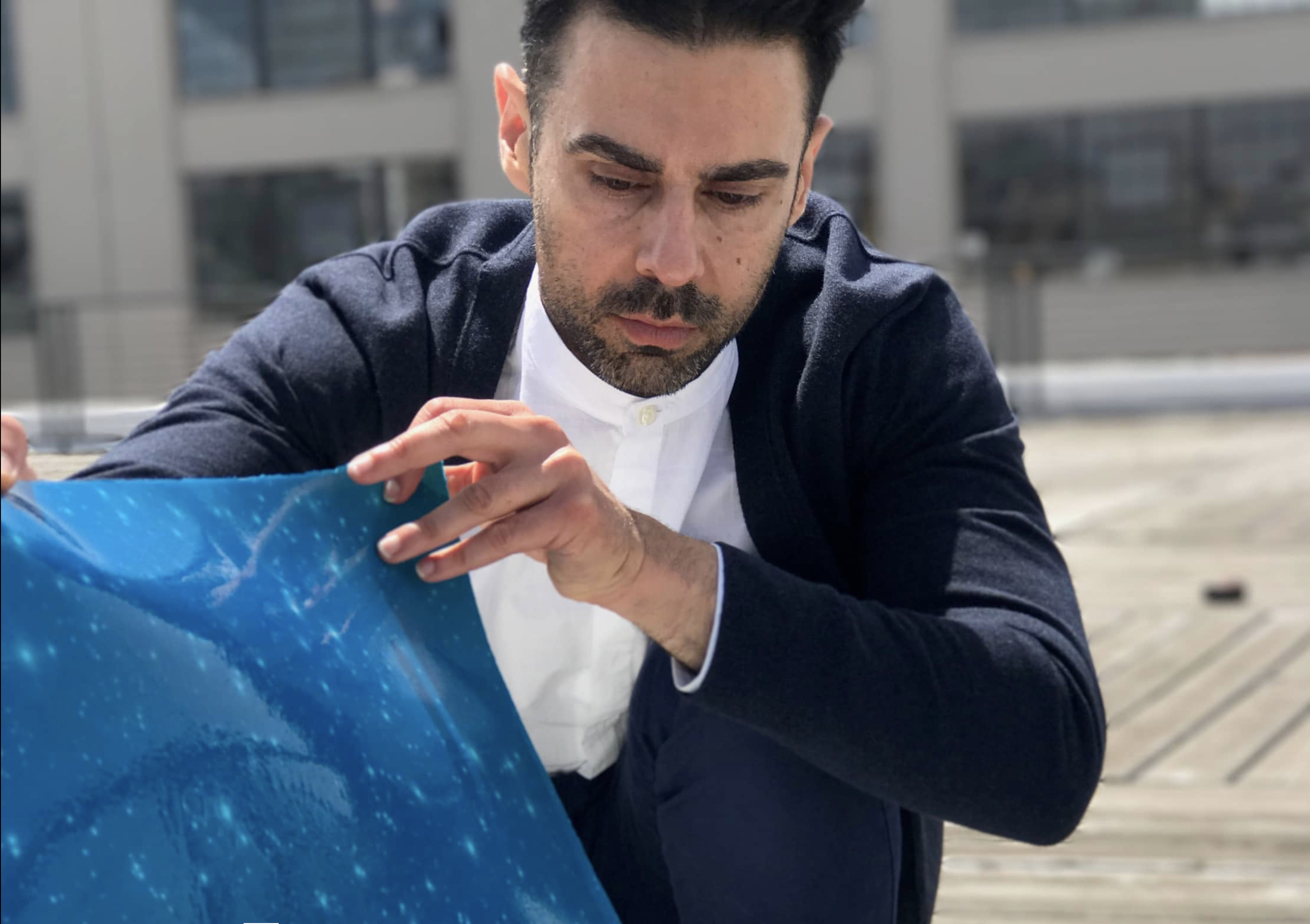
- Born: 1978 (age 47–48); Berkeley, California, U.S.
- Education: San Francisco Art Institute, Stanford University
- Known for: Painting, conceptual art, collage
- Website: Ala Ebtekar

Ala Ebtekar (born 1978; Persian: علا ابتکار) is an American contemporary visual artist, of Iranian descent. He is known for his work in painting, drawing, illumination, and installation. His work frequently orchestrates various orbits and cadences of time, bringing forth sculptural and photographic possibilities of the universe, and time, gazing back at us.

Ebtekar's recent work explores liminal experiences bound up with longer non human notions of scientific duration, as well as phenomenology of light. These projects draw out sculptural and photographic possibilities suggested by the idea of the universe gazing back through endless collapses of time, reworking image making process centuries old. His practice examines how contemporary moments exist simultaneously as both minuscule and paramount.

== Early life and education ==
Ala Ebtekar grew up in Berkeley and Oakland, California in the San Francisco Bay Area to parents who immigrated to the United States from Iran. Ebtekar is the great nephew of the renowned Iranian poet Hushang Ebtehaj.

He started drawing at an early age, and by his adolescent years he began to focus his energies on music. In 1992, at age 13, he went through DJ training at KALX 90.7 FM, the radio station of the University of California at Berkeley. This experience with music eventually led Ebtekar to the world of graffiti and ultimately back to an interest in visual art. In 1998 he was chosen to participate in a workshop at Zeum Art and Technology Center (now Children's Creativity Museum) with New York–based artist Tim Rollins and K.O.S. (Kids of Survival) to create work for the center's inaugural exhibition. Ebtekar, along with several other young artists from the San Francisco Bay Area, came to form the core unit for a short lived West Coast chapter of KOS. One year later, Ebtekar traveled to Tehran, Iran to visit extended family which led him to return several months later to study art.

Initially studying with a traditional Persian miniature painter, Ebtekar soon discovered the mid-20th Century style of Qahveh-khanehei painting (Iranian Coffeehouse painting), and he went on to study under master Qahveh-khanehei painter Mohammad Farahani. A style defined as much by its popularity amongst regular folk as its distance from court arts. In contradistinction to the official court painters of the time, qahveh khanehei painters brought fine art from the exclusive province of those with money and power to the domain of the common people. A singular characteristic of Qahveh-khanehei painting was its freedom, as artists of this style created their work with neither external themes nor the attention to proper anatomy and perspective as seen in miniature paintings. Iranian Coffeehouse painters worked entirely from their imagination and creative ability. It's entirely fitting that Ebtekar found early artistic inspiration from the worlds of graffiti and the modern tradition of Qahveh-khanehei painting, as his work has encompassed comparable populist sensibilities spanning continents, celebrating the stories and lives of heroic everyday people across time.

=== Education ===
Following studying traditional painting in Iran with Mohammad Farahani, Ebtekar went on to pursue a formal education in fine arts. In 2002, he received his B.F.A. degree from the San Francisco Art Institute, followed by an M.F.A degree from Stanford University in 2006. He served as a Visiting Lecturer in the Department of Art Practice at the University of California at Berkeley from 2007 to 2008, and has served as visiting faculty in the Department of Art and Art History at Stanford University since 2009.

== Collections ==
- British Museum, London, UK
- Whitney Museum of American Art, New York City, New York
- San Francisco International Airport, San Francisco, California
- Devi Art Foundation, India
- Crocker Art Museum, Sacramento, California
- Orange County Museum of Art, Santa Ana, California
- Berkeley Art Museum and Pacific Film Archive, Berkeley, California
- Deutsche Bank Collection, Germany
- de Young Museum, San Francisco, California
- the Microsoft Art Collection in Redmond, Washington
- San José Museum of Art , San Jose, California
- Crystal Bridges Museum of American Art, Bentonville, Arkansas
- Stanford University Special Collections, Stanford University, Stanford, California
- Allen Memorial Art Museum , Oberlin, Ohio
- San Diego Museum of Art, San Diego, California

== Exhibitions ==
Ebtekar's work has been included in over 70 group exhibitions, 5 two-person exhibitions, and 12 solo exhibitions. Significant solo exhibitions include "Elemental" (2004) at Intersection for the Arts (San Francisco, CA); "Ala Ebtekar" (2007) at Gallery Paule Anglim (San Francisco, CA); "1388" (2009) at The Third Line (Dubai, United Arab Emirates); "Indelible Whispers of the Sun" (2010) at Charlie James Gallery (Los Angeles, CA); "Elsewhen" (2012) at The Third Line (Dubai, United Arab Emirates); and "Absent Arrival" (2012) at Gallery Paule Anglim (San Francisco, CA).

Significant group exhibitions include "The 2006 California Biennial" at the Orange County Museum of Art (Newport Beach, CA); travelling exhibition "One Way or Another: Asian American Art Now” (2006–2008), curated by Melissa Chiu, Director and Curator of Contemporary Asian Art at the Asia Society Museum, Karin Higa, Senior Curator of Art at the Japanese American National Museum, Los Angeles, and Susette S. Min, Assistant Professor of Asian American Studies and Art History at the University of California, Davis and exhibited at Asia Society and Museum (New York, NY), Blaffer Gallery at University of Houston (Houston, TX), Berkeley Art Museum (Berkeley, CA), Japanese American National Museum (Los Angeles, CA), and Honolulu Academy of Arts (Honolulu, HI); "Bay Area Now 5" (2008) at Yerba Buena Center for the Arts (San Francisco, CA), organized by Kate Eilertsen, Acting Director of Visual Arts and Berin Golonu, Associate Visual Arts Curator; and "The Global Contemporary. Art Worlds after 1989" (2011) at Museum of Contemporary Art (Karlsruhe, Germany), curated by Andrea Buddensieg and Peter Weibel. In May 2005, Ebtekar had a two-person exhibition at Lisa Dent Gallery in San Francisco with artist Jeong-Im Yi.

== Stanford University initiative ==
Envisioned and directed by Ala Ebtekar, "Art, Social Space and Public Discourse" is a three-year course in Stanford University on art that investigates the multiple contexts that shift and define changing ideas of public space. This ongoing critical framework of conversations, newly issued art projects, and exploration of various cultural productions and intellectual traditions looks at recent transformations of civic life.

== Recognition ==
He has been awarded residencies at ZKM Center for Art and Media Karlsruhe in Germany, Cité internationale des arts in Paris, Sazmanab in Tehran, Iran, the San Francisco Center for the Book, and 18th Street Art Center in Los Angeles through the Visions from the New California Award, a project of the Alliance of Artist Communities in partnership with the James Irvine Foundation.

The Huffington Post featured and mentioned Ala Ebtekar as one of the "17 Visual Artists You Should Know in 2016".

Ebtekar was named the 2025 King Artist in Residence at Arion Press.
