= Pamela Helena Wilson =

American artist (born 1954)

- Born: 1954 (age 71–72); New York City, United States
- Education: School of the Art Institute of Chicago, University of California, Berkeley
- Known for: Watercolor, painting, drawing
- Awards: Guggenheim Fellowship
- Website: pamelahelenawilson.com

Old Man River, watercolor on paper, 28" x 60", 2007

Pamela Helena Wilson (formerly Pamela Wilson-Ryckman, born 1954) is an American artist. She is best known for watercolor drawings and paintings derived from photographs, largely of news events, architectural forms and landscapes. Her journalistic sources frequently portray scenes of natural and human-made calamity and the conflict, devastation and reactions that follow, often involving teeming crowds and demonstrations (e.g., Old Man River, 2007). Wilson's process and visual editing obscure these events, translating the images into suggestive, new visual experiences with greater urgency, universality and an open-endedness that plays against expectations. In 2013, critic Michelle Grabner wrote, "The luminosity of watercolor on white paper and the alluring atmospheric effects [Wilson] achieves in this medium creates images that are neither photographic or illustrational but seductively abstract and representational."

Wilson has exhibited at the de Young Museum, Berkeley Art Museum and Pacific Film Archive (BAMPFA) and Nordic Watercolour Museum (Sweden), among other venues. Her work belongs to the permanent collections of the San Francisco Museum of Modern Art (SFMOMA) and BAMPFA, and has been commissioned by the San Francisco Arts Commission. In 2009, she was awarded a Guggenheim Fellowship.

== Biography and career ==
Wilson was born in New York, New York in 1954. She earned a B.A. in fine arts from the University of California, Berkeley in 1976 and worked for a period as a scenic artist painting sets for the Santa Fe Opera and the Juilliard School. In 1995, she earned an M.A. in art history, theory and criticism from The School of the Art Institute of Chicago. During the 1990s, Wilson painted in an abstract mode influenced by Asian art and landscape, before turning to the representational work in 1999. From 1999 to 2021, she was based in San Francisco. She currently lives and works in New York City.

Wilson has had solo exhibitions at Gallery Paule Anglim, now Anglim Trimble Gallery (2004–20) in San Francisco, Monique Meloche Gallery (2002, 2005) in Chicago, Dominican University (2016) and rosyendpost (2021) in Greenport, NY, among other venues.

She has shown in surveys including "The Unhomely: Phantom Scenes in Global Society" (International Biennial of Contemporary Art Seville, 2007); "Pacific Light: California Watercolor Refracted, 1907-2007" (Nordic Watercolour Museum, 2007); and "To Bend the Ear of the Outer World" (Gagosian, London, 2023). She has curated shows at the Oakland Art Gallery (2005) and New Langton Arts (2007).

== Work and reception ==
Critics contend that Wilson's work derives power from the interplay between the (traditionally regarded) fragility of her medium—primarily watercolor—and the charged nature of her subject matter. Her approach juxtaposes delicate technical mastery—including striking uses of light and dark, broad washes of color, and white space—with harsh realities of violence and shifting order. It also links the transience of newspaper images to that of watercolor paint. Her images have been described as "deft but unfussy" works of "beauty emerg[ing] out of chaos."

Because of the degree of abstraction and contrast between subject and technique, reviewers suggest that Wilson's work is more engaged with themes of memory, recall and the interpretation of journalistic images than storytelling or memorializing specific events. Her source materials are chosen less for their dramatic statements than as images to be examined or understood in perceptual terms of light, movement, and relationship between shapes and hidden or collapsing forms. Artforum critic Glen Helfand likened her ambivalent urban images to those of Luc Tuymans and Gerhard Richter; he wrote, "wavering between reality and metaphor, the sober and the dreamlike ... [they] evoke the pomp of history painting while skirting that genre's didacticism via astute stylistic choices."

Critics have also related Wilson to figurative artists Marlene Dumas and Peter Doig, abstract painters Joan Mitchell and Richard Diebenkorn, and to the pictorial concerns of Post-Impressionism and Social Realism.

=== Work 1999–2012 ===
After turning to representation, Wilson produced oil paintings and watercolors depicting her surroundings (interiors, views from windows) as well as found news photos that she first presented in a solo exhibition at Monique Meloche Gallery (2002). She continued to explore both these themes and mediums in her mid-decade shows—at Meloche (2005) and Gallery Paule Anglim (2004, 2008)—offering re-articulations of images of war devastation, floods, accidents or masses of people gathered for political events, protest marches or riots.

These works took as much interest in pattern and structure as in the actual events, rendering them in a generalized way; for example, the collapsed high-rise lattice of the watercolor, Building (2004), evoked any number of war or terrorism disasters, while the aerial view in the oil painting Vox Populi (2004) rendered the throng attending George W. Bush's 2000 inauguration ceremony as an undifferentiated mass.

=== Later work ===
Pamela Helena Wilson, Marl Hill Baptist, oil and acrylic on linen, 24" x 30", 2019.

In her later practice, Wilson expanded to oil and acrylic paintings on canvas. Despite titles of exhibitions and individual works (Cairo, Arab Spring) that referenced specific events and places, this work moved toward a greater degree of abstraction. In a San Francisco Chronicle review of her show "GPS" (2013), Kenneth Baker identified the abstraction as a crisis of faith in the ability of images to truthfully portray events: "these works do not so much deny as lament the impossibility of abstract 'history painting'—contemporary painting's incapacity to evolve visual idioms suited to its historical moment."

Wilson's exhibitions, "Berlin Stories" (2015), "Twilight" (2016) and "Second Nature" (2020), focused on architectural structures derived from archival photos, exploring themes of memory and the burden of history. The former show depicted the 19th-century neo-classical buildings of the architect Karl Friedrich Schinkel in floating, strongly colored abstract shapes. Based on 1970s photographs of Soviet-controlled East Germany, "Twilight" rendered the architecture of the DDR in Chinese-landscape influenced brushstrokes; largely divorced from backgrounds and stripped of context, they imply a tension between abstract form and historical consciousness.

In her later work, Wilson has moved toward larger and more abstracted images of landscape and architecture, often rendered in thinly painted, overlapping layers. The oil and acrylic paintings in "Second Nature" and her exhibition at rosyendpost (2021) depicted hazy apparitions of rural Southern churches (largely clapboard siding, rooftops, steeples) in fields of shifting space and color areas that evoked states of order, disuse or vegetative overgrowth (e.g., Marl Hill Baptist, 2019).

== Recognition ==
Wilson has been awarded a John S. Guggenheim Fellowship (2009), an Eisner Foundation grant (1976), and artist residencies at the Institute of Contemporary Art San José, Ossabaw Island Foundation and Yaddo.

Her work belongs to the public collections of the Berkeley Art Museum, The MacArthur Foundation, San Francisco Civic Art Collection, San Francisco Museum of Modern Art, and University of San Francisco, Mission Bay. Her watercolor series "Taking In" (2009–10), which reinterpreted archival images of people looking, reflecting and finding respite within the local urban landscape, was featured in the San Francisco Arts Commission's Art on Market Street program.
