= Tim Rollins and K.O.S. =

Artist

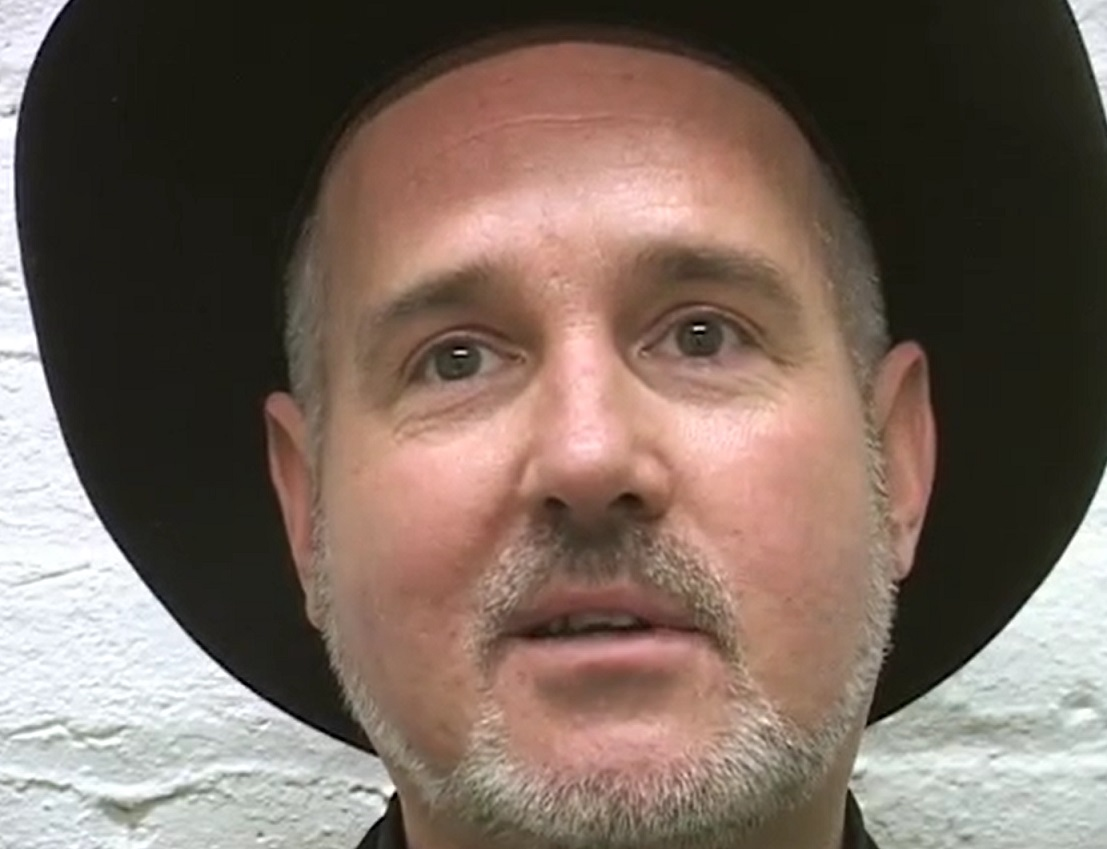
Tim Rollins

Tim Rollins (June 10, 1955 – December 22, 2017) was an American artist who together with the art collaborative K.O.S. formed the art-group Tim Rollins and K.O.S (Kids of Survival).

== Biography ==
Timothy William Rollins was born on June 10, 1955, in Pittsfield, Maine. He was a day student at the Maine Central Institute before studying fine art at the University of Maine. He then earned a BFA from the School of Visual Arts in New York (1975–77). After graduate studies in art education and philosophy at New York University (1977 and 1979), Rollins began teaching art for middle school students in a South Bronx public school. In 1984, he launched the "Art and Knowledge Workshop" in the Bronx together with a group of at-risk students who called themselves K.O.S. (Kids of Survival).

Since the founding of the Art & Knowledge Workshop in 1982, Tim Rollins & K.O.S. have produced allegorical paintings, sculptures and drawings by mining the vast wealth of printed matter - from the popular to the arcane, from the minor to the canonical, from legal documents to comic books (areas in no way mutually exclusive in Rollins & K.O.S.'s view) - which are themselves understood as political allegories.

Rollins died of cardiovascular disease in December 2017, aged 62. The members of K.O.S. at that time included Jose Parissi (b. 1974) Angel Abreu (b. 1974), Jorge Abreu (b. 1979), Robert Branch (b. 1977), Ala Ebtekar (b. 1978), Ricardo Nelson Savinon (b. 1971) and Noe Sosa (b. 1992).

== Exhibitions ==
The group has exhibited worldwide, having participated in two Whitney Biennials (1985, 1991), Documenta (1987), the Venice Biennale (1988), the Carnegie International (1988) and in solo exhibitions at the Walker Art Center, Minneapolis, Minnesota (1988); Institute of Contemporary Art, Boston, Massachusetts (1988); Dia Art Foundation, New York, New York (1989); Wadsworth Atheneum, Hartford, Connecticut (1990); Museum für Gegenwärtskunst Basel, Switzerland (1990); Museum of Contemporary Art, Los Angeles, California (1990); and the Hirshhorn Museum and Sculpture Garden, Washington, D.C. (1992).

== Permanent collections ==
Their work can be seen in public collections including the Museum of Modern Art, New York, the Hirshhorn Museum and Sculpture Garden, the Museum of Fine Arts, Boston, the Pérez Art Museum Miami, and the Tate Gallery, London.

In February 2009, a retrospective survey of the group's work opened at The Frances Young Tang Teaching Museum and Art Gallery at Skidmore College.
