= Katherine Sherwood =

American artist

- Born: 1952 (age 73–74); New Orleans, US
- Education: University of California, Davis; San Francisco Art Institute
- Website: www.katherinesherwood.com

Katherine Sherwood is an American artist living and working in the San Francisco Bay Area, California who is known for paintings that explore disability, feminism, and healing, and for her teaching and disability rights activism at the Department of Art Practice at the University of California, Berkeley.

== Early life and education ==
Katherine Sherwood was born in 1952 in New Orleans, Louisiana. After the early death of her father and remarriage of her mother, her family relocated to California, where she attended a Catholic high school. She received a B.A. in Art History in 1975 from the University of California, Davis, where she studied art with painter Mike Henderson, and an M.F.A. in 1979 from San Francisco Art Institute.

== Career ==
After graduating from UC Davis, Sherwood lived in San Francisco, California, and was involved in the Bay Area punk scene. She created irreverent, crudely figurative paintings that appropriated Catholic iconography, including the Aggressive Women series (1978–82) that made use of junk shop frames and depicted Catholic female martyrs and sex workers. She had her first solo exhibition at Gallery Paule Anglim in 1982, the beginning of a lifelong relationship with the gallery.

After moving to New York, where she was involved with the East Village art, punk, and countercultural scene, Sherwood continued to exhibit work with themes including gender, technology, religious iconography, and medical imaging. In 1990, she was hired as a tenure-track professor by the University of California, Berkeley Department of Art Practice, where she taught painting alongside colleagues Joan Brown and Wendy Sussman.

In 1997, at the age of 44, she had a massive stroke – a cerebral hemorrhage – which paralysed the right side of her body, and affected her cognition and speech. Teaching herself to paint again was essential to her healing process. Paintings from this period incorporated images of cerebral angiograms of her own brain and magical healing symbols from the Lemegeton. These paintings used colorful abstract passages of poured paint with intentional craquelure. Sherwood had been using images of the brain in her work as early as 1991, and said of her stroke that it was when “my life caught up to my art”. She gained national attention with the publication of an article on the cover of the Wall Street Journal in 2000 and inclusion in the Whitney Biennial, also in 2000.

=== Disability art ===
As she redeveloped her approach to painting, her work became an extension of her disability rights activism. At UC Berkeley, she developed a course “Art and Disability,” and became active in the disability studies program. She wrote and spoke widely about her personal experience with disability and would later go on to be on the board of Creative Growth Art Center, Oakland, an organization that supports artists with developmental disabilities. Sherwood is critical of the way her story is framed in the media as an “overcoming narrative.” She sees her disability as a valuable part of who she is, not a disadvantage to be overcome.

Beginning in 2010, Sherwood began a new body of figurative work with collaged MRIs that explicitly addressed disability. The “Venus” series (2013-22) appropriates well-known images of reclining female nudes painted on the reverse sides of posters of canonical works of Western art history. Sherwood renders them as proud, disabled women with prosthetics or assistive technologies. The “Brain Flowers” series (2014-22) makes use of imagery from the vanitas paintings of 17th century Dutch and other European women painters, including Rachel Ruysch, Maria van Oosterwijck, Josefa de Óbidos, Maria Sibylla Merian, and others, both garnering attention for these now underrecognized women painters and using the symbolic language of vanitas paintings to address disability and mortality.

== Collections ==
Katherine Sherwood’s work is housed in the permanent collections of the San Francisco Museum of Modern Art; the Berkeley Art Museum and Pacific Film Archive; the Fine Arts Museums of San Francisco; the Crocker Art Museum, Sacramento; the San Jose Museum of Art; the De Young Museum, San Francisco; the Museum of Contemporary Art San Diego, the Palm Springs Art Museum, the National Academy of Sciences, Washington DC; the U.S. Department of State, Washington DC; Microsoft Corporation, Redmond, Washington; and the Ford Foundation, New York, among other public and private collections.

== Recognition ==
Sherwood received an honorary doctorate from the School of the Art Institute of Chicago in 2020; a Wynn Newhouse Award in 2012, a Joan Mitchell Foundation Grant in 2006, a Guggenheim Fellowship Award in 2005, an Adaline Kent Award from San Francisco Art Institute in 1999, a Pollack-Krasner Foundation Grant in 1998, an Adolph and Esther Gottlieb Foundation Grant in 1997, and a National Endowment for the Arts Artist Fellowship in 1989. On November 11, 2026, Sherwood was awarded an Anonymous Was A Woman grant.
