= Hossein Qollar-Aqasi =

Iranian painter (1902–1966)

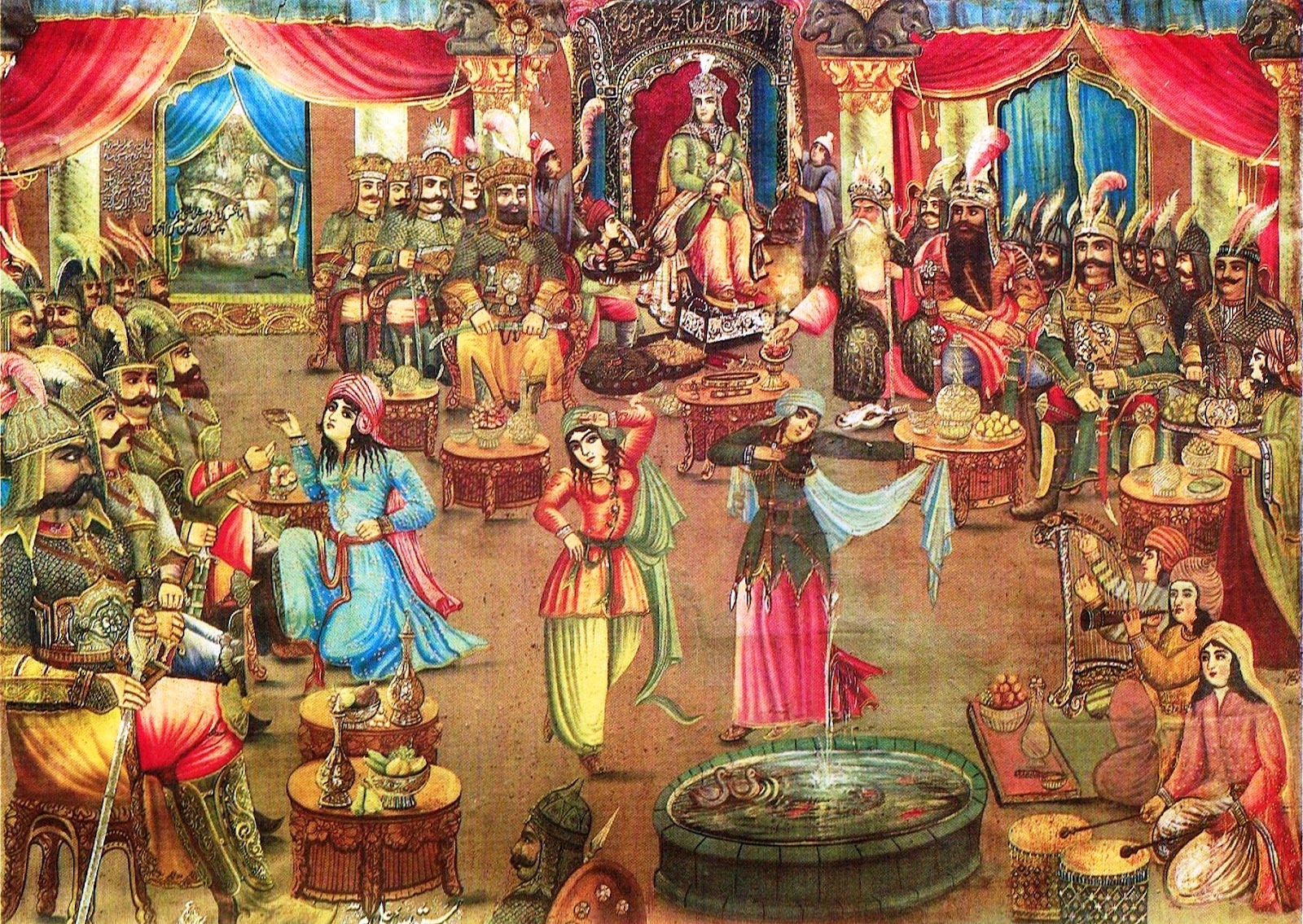
Coffee House, painting by Hossein Qollar-Aqasi (1920), Reza Abbasi Museum

Hossein Qollar-Aghasi (1902–1966) was an Iranian painter. He was born in Tehran, Iran and was the son of Ali-Reza Qollar-Aghasi, a designer of tile-work patterns. He acquired rudimentary skills of traditional painting in his father's workshop. He was one of the developers of "Coffeehouse Painting", creating canvas works and mural frescoes based on religious traditions and national epics from the Shahnameh.

He mentored from a very early age Mohammad Farahani who continued painting in the Iranian Coffeehouse painting school.
