= Mohammad Farahani =

Painter (1937–2012)

Mohammad Farahani

Mohammad Farahani (1937 – 2012), also known as Mohammad Darvish, was one of the most prominent second generation Iranian Coffeehouse painters. When he was thirteen years old, he met Hossein Qollar-Aqasi, one of the founding fathers of the genre, at a coffeehouse in Tehran (Qahveh-khaneh Mehdi Siah) while accompanying his wandering dervish uncle. Realizing the young boy's talent, Hossein Qollar-Aqasi took him under his mentorship. Farahani produced oil paintings and églomisé works depicting scenes from the Shahnameh, The Battle of Karbala, among others.

He was the mentor of contemporary artist Ala Ebtekar

His works are in the permanent collection of such institutions as the Reza Abbasi Museum in Tehran and the Iranian Cultural Heritage Museum.
