= Cham Hendon =

American artist

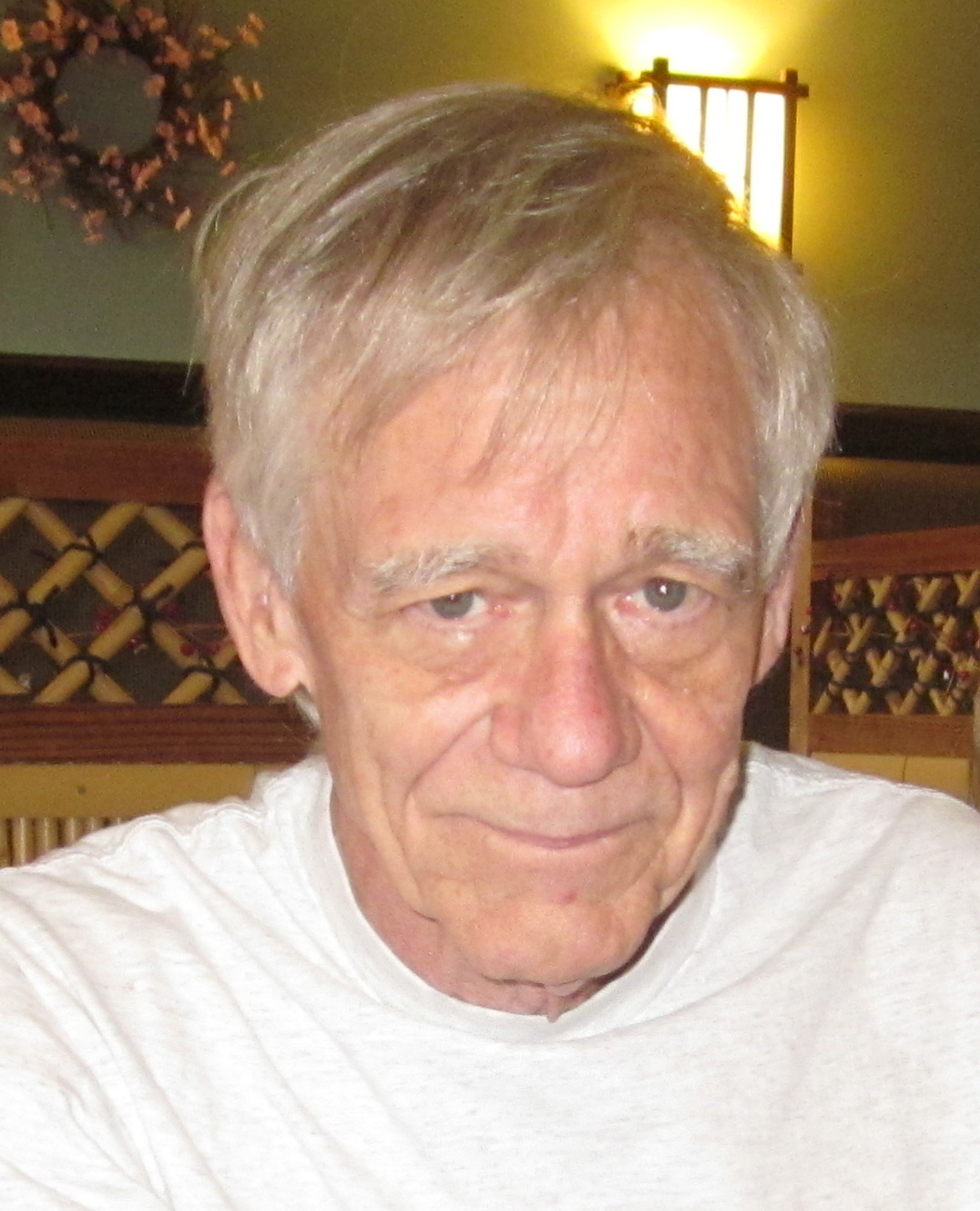

Robert Chambless "Cham" Hendon (September 14, 1936 – January 11, 2014) was an American painter whose unusual style of painting and lush, colorful canvases earned him recognition in the New York City art scene of the 1970s and 80s.

Represented by the Phyllis Kind Gallery in Soho, New York City, Hendon's work became part of the collections of several major New York City museums, including the Metropolitan Museum of Art, The Museum of the City of New York, and The New Museum of Contemporary Art, as well as museums outside New York City and major private collections. His work was included in the seminal "Bad Painting" show at the New Museum (January, 1978), as the museum, under the direction of Marcia Tucker, was encouraging people to think about art and museums in a new way.

Cham, as he was known since his childhood, was a quiet, well-educated man with a good sense of humor and the manners instilled by a Southern up-bringing. He had a great knowledge of the history of art and he was always interested in the work of his contemporaries. When asked once if he was "driven" to make paintings, he replied that he didn't think he was driven, he just wasn't happy doing anything else.

Hendon moved to Connecticut in 2007 where he continued painting until the end of his life. He was very active in the New Haven art community and he attended the opening of his last one-man show at Fred Giampietro Gallery in New Haven, Connecticut two months before his death.

Cham Hendon died of lung cancer at his home in Hamden, Connecticut at the age of 77.

== Early life ==
Hendon was born in Birmingham, Alabama on September 14, 1936 to Harry Holman Hendon, a successful civil engineer and Helon (Allgood) Hendon. Cham showed an interest in art from an early age and he won several prizes in high school for his art work, but after graduation in 1954 he decided to follow the lead of his father, and his older brother, Harry, and become an engineer. He attended the Georgia Institute of Technology and graduated in 1958 with a bachelor's degree in Engineering.

After fulfilling his military obligation, Hendon attended the School of the Art Institute of Chicago and graduated with a Bachelor of Fine Arts degree in 1963. While attending the Art Institute he met and married Cathryn "Kay" Campbell. Their first child, Sarah Patricia Hendon, was born in Chicago on April 2, 1962.

Hendon and his family then moved to New Mexico, where he attended graduate school at the University of New Mexico at Albuquerque. He graduated with a master's degree in Fine Arts in 1965. His second daughter, Jean Campbell Hendon, was born in Albuquerque on July 10, 1963.

After graduation, Hendon took a position at the University of Denver, Denver Colorado, where he taught painting, drawing and design. His third child, a son, Luke Chambless Hendon, was born in Denver on January 23, 1967.

In 1967, Hendon relocated his family to Madison, Wisconsin where he became the Director of the Madison Art Center, a position he held from 1968 to 1977. During this time, he continued to paint in a small studio at his home. By 1977 when he left the Madison Art Center, he had separated from his wife, moved into a larger studio space and was devoting his time to exploring a new approach to painting with acrylic paint. He completed a Master of Fine Arts degree that year at the University of Wisconsin–Madison and his paintings were represented by the Phyllis Kind Gallery in Chicago. During this time, he met Shelley Lynn (O'Meara) Caldwell and in 1978, he moved, with Shelley and her small son, Ian Michael Caldwell, to a loft in Tribeca in New York City. He remained with Shelley until his death in 2014. They have one daughter, Wallis Helon Caldwell Hendon, born in New York City on May 16, 1981.

== New York years, 1978-1999 ==
=== Painting ===
John Russell, art critic for The New York Times, wrote in 1979, "When Marcia Tucker got together an exhibition called "Bad Painting" at the New Museum not long ago, the best bad painter on view was a young man from Wisconsin called Cham Hendon." Hendon's work was marked by "a speculative and tenacious intelligence", and Russell went on to say that the paintings were good to look at, they had something to say and they were not taken from anyone else.

That unique quality of Hendon's paintings defies classification. Some of his work has been called "narrative painting", but only a portion of his work fits that definition. His paintings have "affinities with Pop Art", but not the "dead-pan look of Pop Art". His method of painting is "akin to Jackson Pollock" and has been described as a "slow motion form of action painting", but the result is figurative, not abstract. Hendon's style has been referred to as "poured pointillism", and "synthetic impressionist portraits".

The "unique glossy surfaces provoke the question 'How does he do that?'. There are many variations on the description of how the paintings are done, but most agree that the paintings are created by pouring the paint onto a canvas stretched on a flat surface. The canvas has a drawing on it to guide Hendon's work and the poured paint builds up a thick, multicolored surface that defines the shapes in the drawing.

The resulting paintings are difficult to put into words. They have been described variously as "melted psychedelic ice cream and infrared photographs", "colored frostings", "melted linoleum", and "erratic veination".

But knowing how the paint is applied, and reading descriptions of the paintings, does not prepare the viewer for the visual impact of an actual painting. The poured paint "achieves a great physical presence, vital and energetic, with a good-natured energy that is truly infectious".

=== Printmaking ===
Though primarily a painter, Hendon participated in a print making project at Tandem Press, an extraordinary printmaking studio that was just getting underway in 1987 at the University of Wisconsin. William Weege, the driving force behind Tandem Press, believed strongly in the collaborative nature of the print making process and he attracted many artists who were not primarily printmakers. Hendon's print, a large, three-panel, reductive print titled "Musings" is now in the collection of the Chazen Museum of Art (formerly Elvejhem Museum of Art) at the University of Wisconsin in Madison, Wisconsin.

=== Exhibitions ===
Two events had a major impact on Hendon's career. In 1978, he participated in the "'Bad' Painting" show at the New Museum in New York City, curated by Marcia Tucker. His work was well received in New York and the three paintings he exhibited sold the night the show opened. At the same time, his friend and dealer, Phyllis Kind, opened a gallery in Soho in New York City and she moved Hendon's work from her Chicago gallery to New York. His work began to sell immediately. Hendon decided to move to New York City. The years in his Leonard Street studio in Tribeca in New York City (1978-1985) and his Hudson studio at the house he bought in Columbia County, New York (1985-1999) were very productive ones. By 1990, he had produced over 300 paintings. During those years, his work was the subject of more than thirty solo exhibitions and over fifty group shows, in the United States and in other countries, including Germany, Italy , and Mexico. Hendon's work has been represented by Phyllis Kind Gallery, New York City; Monty Stabler Galleries, Birmingham, Alabama; SFMOMA Artists Gallery, San Francisco, California; and Fred Giampietro Gallery, New Haven, Connecticut.

=== Collections ===
Hendon's work is in the collections of several major public institutions including The Metropolitan Museum of Art, New York; The Museum of the City of New York, New York; The New Museum of Contemporary Art, New York; City College of New York, New York; Chase Manhattan Bank, New York; Neuberger Museum of Art, Purchase, New York; Pennsylvania Academy of Fine Arts, Philadelphia, Pennsylvania; Davidson College, Davidson, North Carolina; Birmingham Museum of Art, Birmingham, Alabama; University of Michigan Museum of Art, Ann Arbor, Michigan; Wisconsin Center for Educational Research, Madison, Wisconsin; Madison Museum of Contemporary Art (formerly Madison Art Center), Madison, Wisconsin. and the Chazen Museum of Art (formerly Elvejhem Museum of Art), Madison, Wisconsin.

=== Recognition ===
Hendon received grants from P.S.1, the Clocktower Studio Residency in 1980; the Merchant Ivory Foundation in 1992; and the Pollock-Krasner Foundation in 2010. He also held visiting artist positions at East Carolina State University, Greenville, North Carolina; Mankato State College, Mankato, Minnesota; and Virginia Commonwealth University, Richmond, Virginia.

== California & Connecticut, 1999-2014 ==
From 1999 to 2007, Hendon lived and worked in California. He had a home and studio in Oakland and showed his work at the San Francisco Museum of Modern Art, Artists Gallery in San Francisco, California and Monty Stabler Galleries in Birmingham, Alabama. In 2007, Hendon returned to the east coast, settling in Hamden, Connecticut where he continued to paint and show his work until his death in 2014. His estate is represented by Fred Giampietro Gallery in New Haven, Connecticut.

== Bibliography ==
- Art Forum, "Bad Painting, the New Museum", Deborah Perlberg, April, 1978, pp. 68–69.
- New York Times, "Bad Painting", John Russell, January 16, 1978, p. C21.
- Arts, "Cham Hendon", Harold Olejarz, May, 1979, p. 27.
- Art in America, "Cham Hendon at Phyllis Kind", Carter Ratcliff, November 1980, p. 40.
- New York Post, "How'm I Doing? Not Bad and in Acrylics Yet", Jerry Tallmer, October 10, 1981, p. 13.
- New York Times, "Cham Hendon", John Russell, October 23, 1981.
- Art Forum, "Cham Hendon", Lisa Liebmann, December, 1983, p. 74.
- The Birmingham News, "Art Happenings", James R. Nelson, July 14, 1985, p. F7.
- The Arts Journal, "Bad Paintings by Cham Hendon", Tom Patterson, North Carolina, Vol. 15, No. 7, April 1990, pp. 10–11.
- Triad Style, "Outside-Inside: The Waterworks", Chris Redd, North Carolina, March 28, 1990, p. 12.
- The Salisbury Post, "Outsider Art Inside the Waterworks", Salisbury, North Carolina, March 8, 1990, p. D1.
- Art Papers, "Cham Hendon, Equal Justice Under Law" William G. Doty, Moody Gallery of Art, University of Alabama, Tuscaloosa, Alabama, Vol. 15, No. 1, January–February 1991, p. 43.
- Long Island Newsday, "The Stories Painting and Sculpture Tell In The 80's", Karen Lipson, Nassau County, New York, August 9, 1991.
- The Independent, "Art Works by Cham Hendon Open Show at Red Mills Sat.", Hudson, New York, October 3, 1991, p. 16
