= Anne Chu =

American artist (1959–2016)

- Anne Chu in 2007
- Born: 1959; New York, New York
- Died: July 25, 2016 (aged 56–57); New York, New York
- Known for: Sculpture

Anne Chu (1959 – July 25, 2016) was an American sculptor. She created mixed-media sculptures, working in fabric, leather, metal, porcelian, resin, and wood. Her work has been exhibited at the Berkeley Art Museum, the Dallas Museum of Art, and the Indianapolis Museum of Art. Her work is in the permanent collection of the National Gallery of Art.

== Early life ==
Chu was born in 1959 in New York City. Her parents came from China, and her father was a mathematics professor at Columbia University. When she was in middle school, her family moved to Westchester County, north of the city. She graduated from the Philadelphia College of Art (now the University of the Arts) in 1982 and received an MFA from Columbia University in 1985.

== Artistic style ==
Despite being a Chinese American, Anne Chu does not identify closely with Chinese culture. Instead, her sculptures "reflect a thorough knowledge of world art, much of it coming from Western sources and years of going to galleries and museums". Chu's focus on art history has resulted in a singular vision, affecting her works which "place a contemporary sensibility in genuine dialogue with the past", giving an "ad hoc, but never excessively informal, sense of the present".

Chu's works, influenced by the combination of eastern and western elements, create a "strong dichotomy between that which is modern and ancient, abstract and figurative, unknown and fantastical". She applies multiple techniques that "unite form, content, and color" in a "seemingly effortless, cohesive manner". Despite being primarily a sculptor, "creating monumental works from wood, ceramic, and papier-mâché", “Chu also makes watercolors and monotypes”. In these mediums she chooses the themes of "landscapes, castles, and knights", creating exotic works that seem abstract but thematically connect her works through figurative elements.

According to Heidi Zuckerman Jacobson, a curator at the Berkeley Museum of Art, Anne Chu explores issues in sculpture and painting by "infusing painting into materials that are themselves used in unexpected ways. By shifting conventional expectations of the appearance of sculpture, the artist allows a reconsideration of the familiar." For example, she uses "traditional Chinese artifacts as a base from which to work". She has remade "T'ang dynasty ceramic funerary figures, sculpted Asian and Western–inspired landscapes, and painted luminous watercolors characterized by a subtle tension between abstraction and figuration".

Chu's work consists largely of bold mixed-media sculptures in "wood, metal, resin, fabric, leather, or porcelain, as well as delicate watercolors and ink-based works on paper". She often combined "figures and animals with elements drawn from folklore; just as often, however, her work could be nearly unrecognizable from one piece to the next. In deliberately remaking herself this way, Chu developed a unique visual language, celebrated in more than 30 solo exhibitions over a 25-year period".

== Works and publications ==
=== Ballplayer on Horse ===
In Chu's Ballplayer on Horse (1998), "an elaborately carved and painted male figure sits atop a bronze horse". Bronze horses, together with their riders, are often mass-produced, accompanying a nobleman in burial as the representation of his lifelong possession. "Chu's use of a figure mounted on a horse results from a general interest in these types of burial figures". Knowing that different materials create a distinct visual presence, Chu pairs bronze with wood. In this sculpture, "the bronze horse shares a patchy, expressive painting style with the figure. Head cocked to one side, one hand on his chest and the other raised in an extended gesture, the ballplayer is poised to throw". Their symbolic gestures suggest that horses and their riders not only indicate an individual's status in ancient China, but also serve as a necessity for political survival.

=== Small Landscape (1999) ===
Chu also creates watercolors in a sensuous fashion that the "subjects, figures, and landscapes" are subtly addressed. "If Chu's Small Landscape (1999) were displayed without the title and removed from the context of her other works, one would take the drawing as purely abstract". True to the medium of watercolor, it is loosely painted in bright colors at the bottom of its animated and elongated shapes. Knowing Chu's "idiosyncratic color schemes", "the juxtaposition of yellow with lavender, red with olive green, and rose with chocolate brown" may refer to "a waterfall flowing through a rough mountain landscape, with the sun burning through a foggy morning".

=== Guardian and House (1999) ===
In her shift from the "full figure to the portrait bust", Chu again focuses on what characterizes an individual: the face. And again, "she imposes an individuality on the T'ang figures". "The people in these new portrait busts are copies of Chu's burial figures (which are of course copies of T'ang figures)". Similar to the traditional process employed by Chinese artisans, Chu also creates the "same figures repeatedly". While Chu's images are reminiscent of known icons, they stand somehow "separate, tentative, and thus more powerful for their subtle distortions or personalizations". "Chu has created sculpture in a variety of different sizes". Her interest in scale, however, usually relates to disproportionate human scale that serves other purposes. She uses this element as a "sensory trigger" to encourage alternative interpretations. In Guardian and House (1999), "a multi–storied Han–style tower cast from bright orange urethane is surveyed by a cast-iron guardian figure that is suspended from the ceiling". Here, in opposition to realistic proportions, "Chu makes the figure and the tower approximately the same size. The grimace of the guardian figure's face is perhaps intended to ward off intruders or evil spirits. As another means of establishing a dynamic and disconcerting relationship between the two objects, the gnarled surface of the bronze body contrasts with the smooth, elegant surface of the tower".

=== Bestial, Tracollo, and Charming Girl (2003) ===
"Ropes connect the puppets's arms and heads to an out-of-reach puppeteer's frame on the ceiling, while they remain frozen, like all artworks, in postures eternally soliciting attention". Their passive performance is ended by the time when Chu finished the work of sewing, sawing and assembling in her studio. Now, they tell the story of their own making: "Wire frames are ingeniously clothed to become torsos. Heads and hands are chopped from wood with a rough vigor that could be called violent if the characters’s storybookish dispositions weren't so benign. Bestial is a ghoulish she-devil who threatens only comically, with her cartoonish bear paws and Humpty-Dumpty figure. Tracollo, in dapper pajamas, has his face completely wrapped in bandages, as though his own carving had wounded him. Charming Girl sits holding her own little puppet guy on a stick, but her puppeting hand is a fused blob with zero finger control".

These characters are deprived of agency. The means through which they perceive the world are compromised by "eyes sometimes closed, sometimes only partially articulated and occasionally simply left as a pair of gouged holes". Their hands can't make a fist, denying them the possibility to grasp anything. "Even their incompleteness emphasizes their confinement to a world of material objects: wires spring out, seams show, and wood splinters or splits". They seem to be manipulated by forces beyond their recognition. On the one hand, "Chu's sculptures argue for a secret life as a materials-oriented abstraction, the formalism disguised as vernacular figuration. The ad hoc use of wood, wire, and cloth is, in this argument, only pretending to serve the theatrical content". On the other hand, the sculptures are "expressive self portraits" that reflect the social conformity and uncontrollable performances that entangle the artist.

"But Chu's big toys are suavely cosmopolitan with their ranging allusions and shifting identifications, their syncopated construction energies of cutting and stitching, their mix of high artifice and practicality. The work recruits historic precursors from China and Europe with a fluid anthropological imagination. We are invited to eavesdrop on lively conversations between Chu and the art of museums; their talk is intimate, affable, mischievous, and filled with affectionate expansiveness. Chu's robust works neither depict other depictions nor are they pure products of the imagination. They are hybrid singularities that ardently perform both possibilities".

=== Single Bear (Polyester) (2008) ===
This piece of work unveils Chu's tendency to "blur the line between useful object and conceptual creation". Between the bear’s head and shoulders, there is a faint line: "a seam, like that of a mask or headpiece of a costume for a mascot, or for theatre". "While the bear has its own distinctive features — a waxy, blue, winking and slightly contorted face — its character depends on who tries it on for size and fills it with their presence". As such, this art work, featuring an object, becomes far more than a "cast-resin pseudo-soft-sculpture creation", implying the animation of the lifeless through human intervention.

=== Hanging Goat (2008) ===
"Dangling limply from the ceiling, the goat is a marionette without a play. Its eerie deconstructed form is also reminiscent of a butchered animal". Yet the haphazardness expressed through its appearance free the viewers from this dark implication. "It is a humble creature, a modest offering — but at the same time, an unspoken challenge, like it or not".

== Other exhibitions ==
Venue	Works exhibited	References
Museum of Modern Art	Landscape (1999), Figure Self-Portrait (2002)	
Institute of Contemporary Art, Philadelphia	Mineral Spirits (2011)	
San Francisco Museum of Modern Art	Ball Player Riding over a Mountain (1999), Stone Cliffs (1999)	
The Bonnier Gallery	Cardinal (2007)	
Anglim Gilbert Gallery	Pisces Underwater (2016), Flower Drawing No.1 (2011), Pipe Fish (2016), Underwater Rattus (2016), Fabullus (2012), Landscape with Flowers No.1 (2011), Grey Rattus (2016), Bust: Young Roman Boy (2012), Burial of the Sardine #2 & #7 (2016)	
303 Gallery	Left of a Pair (2008), Epipsychidion (2008), Birds of Prey (2008), Dancing Girl on Wood (2008), Right in a Pair (2008), Rietberg Figurine and Head (2008), Figurine (2008), Goat with Cubes No.2 & No.3 (2008), Blue Jay (print) (2008), From a Hanging Garden (2007)	

== Award ==
- 1997 The Louis Comfort Tiffany Foundation fellowship
- 2010 Guggenheim Fellowship
- 1999 Joan Mitchell Foundation award
- Anonymous Was a Woman Foundation winner
