= Paule Anglim =

Canadian art dealer and curator (1923-2015)

- Born: January 30, 1923
- Died: April 2, 2015 (aged 92)
- Known for: art dealer, curator

Paule Isabelle Anglim (January 30, 1923 – April 2, 2015) was a Canadian-born gallerist, dealer, and curator. She founded and directed Gallery Paule Anglim in San Francisco for approximately four decades before her death on April 2, 2015. According to a tribute written about her in SF Gate April 2, 2015, Anglim "endeared herself to the artists she handled with her unflinching commitment to work that she believed in. Her exhibitions encompassed the work of defining figures of the Bay Area Beat era and conceptual art sensibility, such as David Ireland, Paul Kos, Tom Marioni and Jim Melchert."

== Life and career ==
Born in a small town near Quebec City, Paule Anglim grew up speaking French. She was educated at the Université Laval in Quebec and at the University of Toronto. After graduating with a degree in sociology, she was hired by Catholic Social Services to be a social worker in San Francisco. She gravitated toward the art world via an interest in architecture. Her first business was called Architecture Art Service, and her first exhibition was a look at fine art in new architecture, mounted at the school of architecture at UC Berkeley. Early in Anglim's career she specialized in public art and the siting of sculpture in relation to architecture and public landscapes, working with Alexander Calder, Henry Moore, and Isamu Noguchi, among others. She opened Gallery Paule Anglim in the early 1970s in North Beach and became popular for showing the fine art associated with the Beat scene. Joan Brown, Bruce Conner, and Jess Collins segued into the Conceptual Art movement of the 1960s and ’70s, and brought Bay Area conceptual artists to international attention. In the 1980s, the gallery moved to Geary Street and continued to show sculpture, installation, video, performance, and conceptual art. Anglim met her near-contemporary Louise Bourgeois in Paris, offering her a solo show in 1987, and represented the artist until her death in 2010. In 2007, Bourgeois' Crouching Spider, on loan from the artist, was installed on San Francisco's Embarcadero, epitomizing Anglim's longstanding commitment to the public realm. Another Spider, acquired from Gallery Paule Anglim in 1996, set records at auction when sold by a private collector for 10.7 m in 2011 and remains among the world's most highly valued artworks by a woman.

== Artists supported by Paule Anglim ==
See Gallery Paule Anglim.

== Personal life ==
Paule Anglim was married twice, to Charles Anglim and later to William Turnbull, both deceased. Her son Philip Anglim became an award-winning stage and television actor. Anglim preferred not to share her birth date. She held an annual "Epiphany Party" in January at her home, across the street from the San Francisco Art Institute. Her sparsely furnished Russian Hill home, where she hosted salons and dinners, housed her personal art collection, including works of Francis Picabia, Rebecca Horn, and Marcel Duchamp, among others.
