= Ellen Berkenblit =

American painter

- Born: May 4, 1958; Paterson, New Jersey, US
- Education: Cooper Union
- Known for: Painting
- Awards: Guggenheim Fellowship

Ellen Berkenblit (born 1958) is an American painter. She was born in Paterson, New Jersey and graduated from the Cooper Union in 1980. She received an Arts and Letters grant from the American Academy of Arts and Letters in 2013, and a Guggenheim Fellowship in the following year. She has exhibited at the Anton Kern Gallery. The Brooklyn Museum holds examples of her work.

Often working in large-scale and in oil paint, a recurring motif in Berkenblit’s work is a magical female protagonist, frequently depicted as a cartoonish women in profile, with long lashes, rosy cheeks, and wild hair. She is represented by Anton Kern Gallery in New York, Contemporary Fine Arts in Berlin and Corbett vs Dempsey in Chicago.

— Berkenblit's biography on Artnet
