= Michael S. Roth =

President of Wesleyan University

Michael Roth
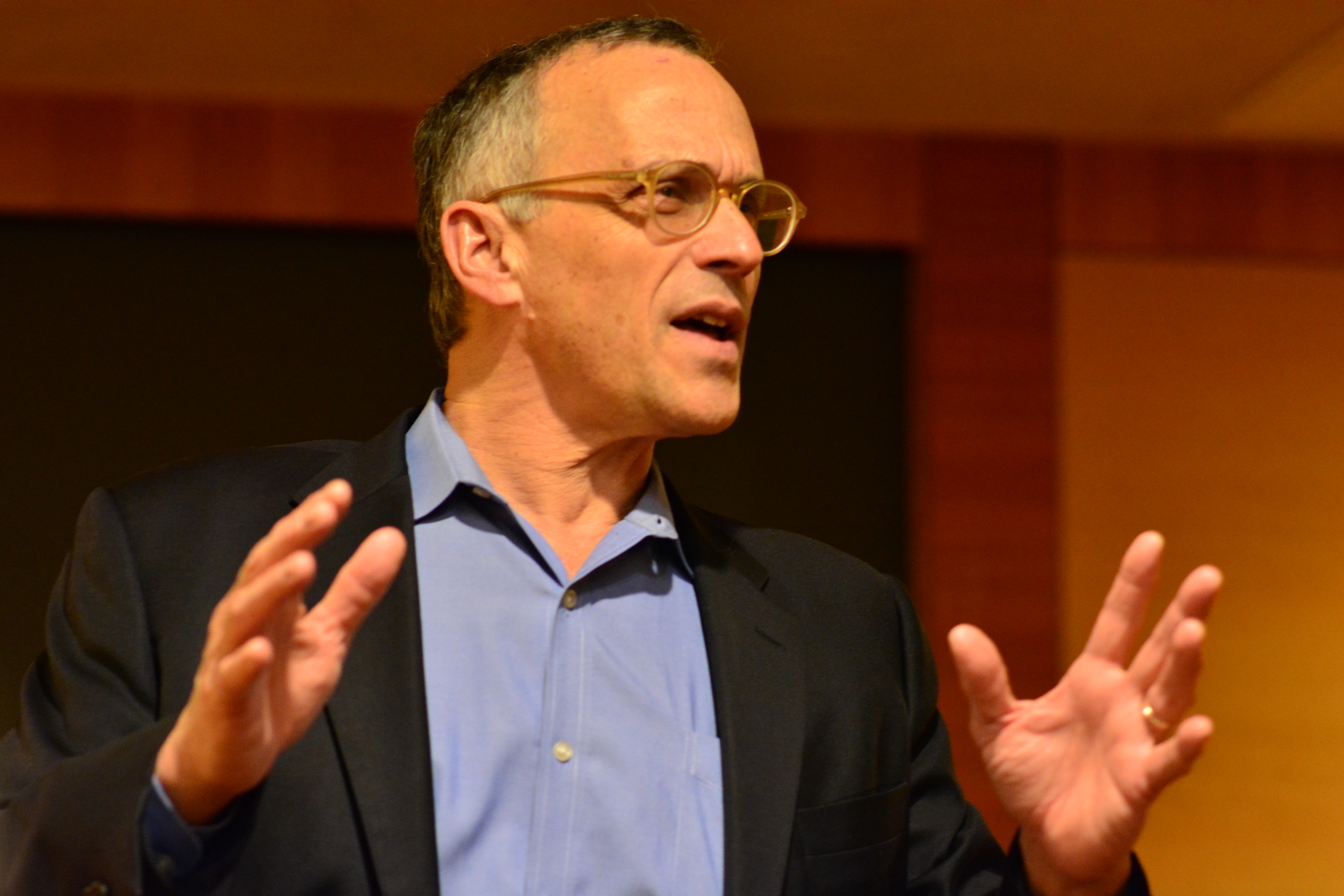

16th President of Wesleyan University
- Incumbent
- Assumed office July 1, 2007
- Preceded by: Douglas J. Bennet

8th President of California College of the Arts
- In office 2000–2007
- Preceded by: Lorne Michael Buchman
- Succeeded by: Stephen Beal

Personal details
- Born: Michael Scott Roth; April 8, 1957 (age 69) New York City, New York, U.S.
- Spouse: Kari Weil
- Website: Official blog

Academic background
- Education: Wesleyan University (BA); Princeton University (MA, PhD)
- Thesis: Knowing and History: The Resurgence of French Hegelianism from the 1930s through the Post-War Period (1983)
- Doctoral advisor: Victor Gourevitch, Jerrold Seigel
- Other advisors: Raymond Aron, Michel Foucault, Eugène Fleischmann

Michael Scott Roth (born April 8, 1957) is an American academic and university administrator. He became the 16th president of Wesleyan University in 2007. Formerly, he was the 8th president of the California College of the Arts (2000–2007), associate director of the Getty Research Institute in Los Angeles, and Director of European Studies at Claremont Graduate University. He was also the H.B. Professor of Humanities at Scripps College, where he was the founding director of the Scripps College Humanities Institute.

== Early life and education ==
Roth was born on April 8, 1957, in Brooklyn, New York. He was the second in his family to attend college. He graduated from Wesleyan University in 1978, completing his studies in three years and graduating summa cum laude and Phi Beta Kappa. While there, he was a member and eventual president of the Alpha Delta Phi Society. He designed his own major in the history of psychological theory. He later went to earn his Ph.D. in history from Princeton University in 1984. Roth teaches every semester and, in May 2009, he was appointed university professor at Wesleyan. Roth is Jewish.

== Career ==
Roth has described his scholarly interests as centered on “how people make sense of the past.” He has edited many volumes in intellectual and cultural history and is the author of six books: Psycho-Analysis as History: Negation and Freedom in Freud (Cornell University Press, 1987, 1995); Knowing and History: Appropriations of Hegel in Twentieth Century France (Cornell University Press, 1988); The Ironist's Cage: Trauma, Memory and the Construction of History (Columbia University Press, 1995); and Irresistible Decay: Ruins Reclaimed, with Clare Lyons and Charles Merewether (Getty Research Institute, 1997). More recent works include Memory, Trauma, and History: Essays on Living With the Past (Columbia University Press, autumn 2011), Beyond The University-Why Liberal Education Matters (Yale University Press, 2014), and Safe Enough Spaces: A Pragmatist's Approach to Inclusion, Free Speech, and Political Correctness on College Campuses (Yale University Press, August 2019).

Roth edited Freud: Conflict and Culture: Essays on His Life, Work, and Legacy, which was produced in association with the Library of Congress. It grew out of the Library's 1998 presentation of "the largest exhibit ever assembled on the life and work of Sigmund Freud," of which Roth was guest curator.

Roth co-edited Looking for Los Angeles: Architecture, Film, Photography and The Urban Landscape and Disturbing Remains: Memory, History, and Crisis in the Twentieth Century (both Getty Research Institute, 2001). He has also published essays and book reviews in the Los Angeles Times, the New York Times, the San Francisco Chronicle, the Washington Post, The Chronicle of Higher Education, the Huffington Post, Slate, Bookforum, Rethinking History, and Wesleyan's History and Theory.

== President of Wesleyan University ==
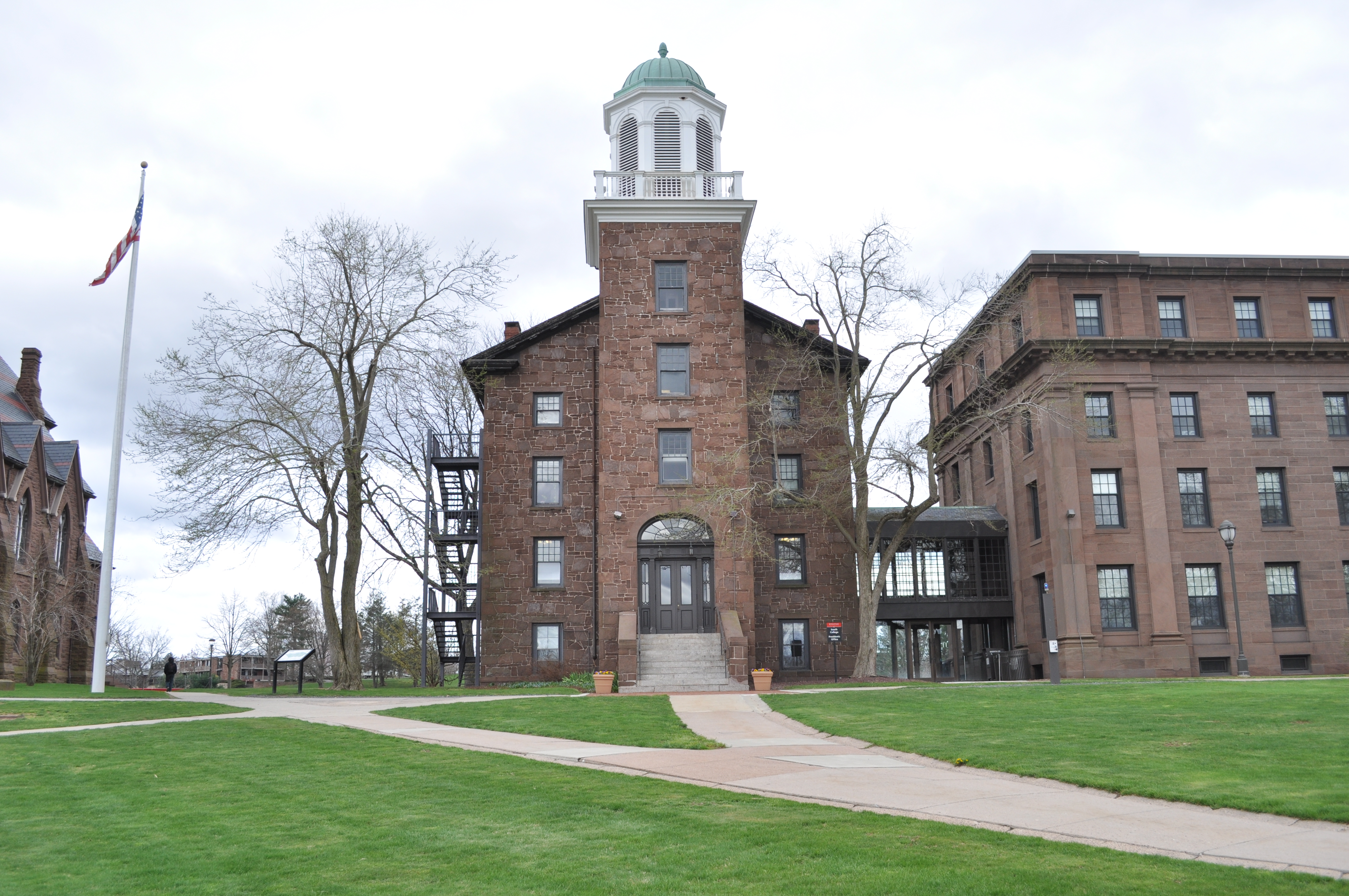
South College, the President's office at Wesleyan University

Roth has undertaken several initiatives at Wesleyan University. The University announced in May 2011 a $2 million donation to establish the Patricelli Center for Social Entrepreneurship, which will support students who want to create programs and organizations serving the public good anywhere in the world. A College of the Environment also has been launched and serves as the University's third multidisciplinary College in addition to the College of Social Studies and the College of Letters. Roth is compensated approximately $1.3 million annually as president of Wesleyan University.

=== Coeducation of fraternities ===
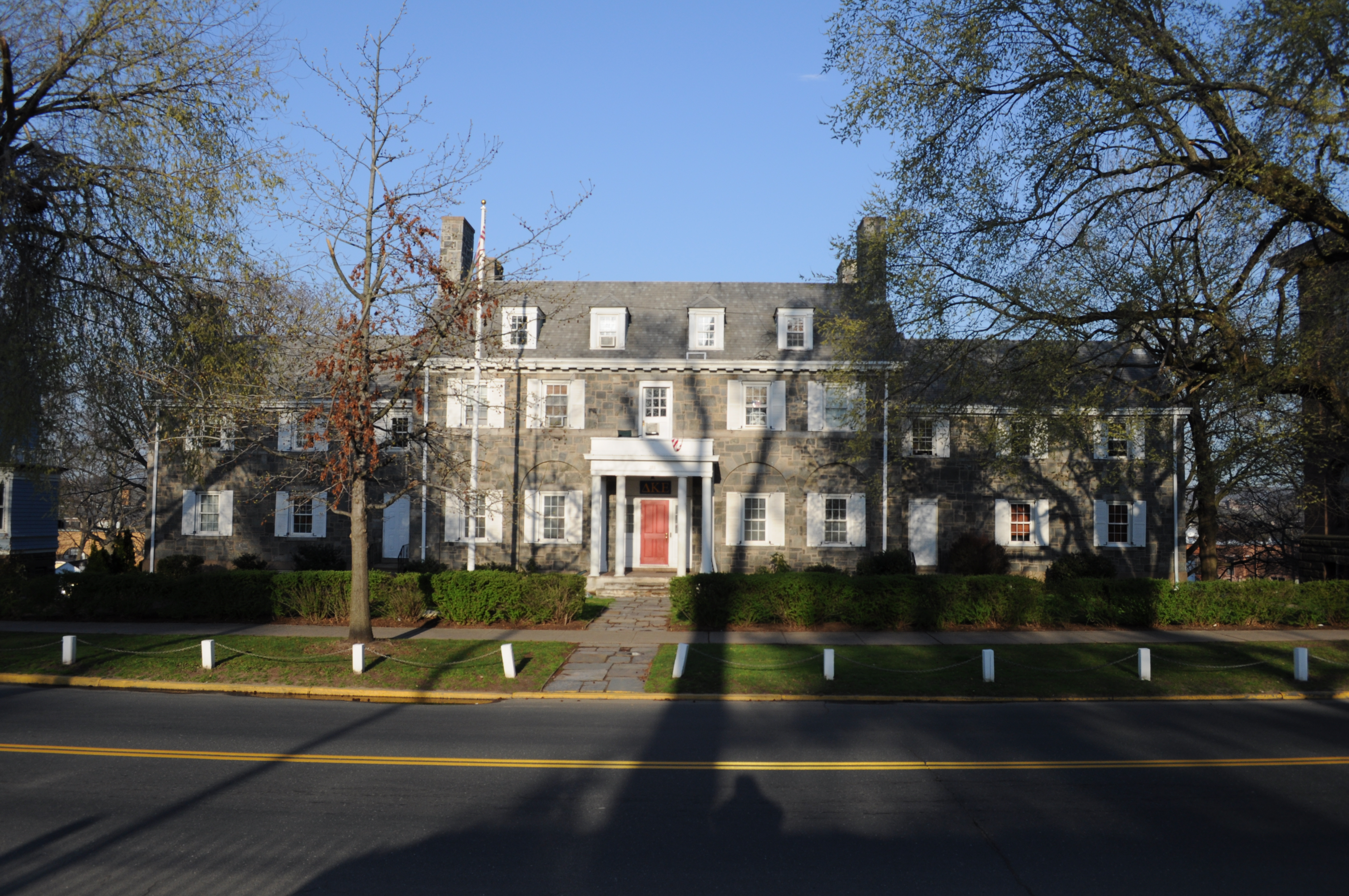
DKE House at Wesleyan University

In 2014, Roth instituted the requirement that in all fraternities at Wesleyan, "Women as well as men must be full members and well represented in the body and leadership of the organization." This was in reaction to reports of sexual assault in fraternity houses over the years, including the years of violent activity at the house of the now dissolved Wesleyan chapter of Beta Theta Pi. While giving organizations three years to comply, Wesleyan did not give students the option to live in single-sex fraternity housing for the 2015–16 school year. The Wesleyan chapter of Delta Kappa Epsilon (DKE) called the decision "political correctness gone wrong" and filed a discrimination lawsuit against Wesleyan. In the case, where the Kent Literary Club (KLC), the alumni chapter of DKE, was suing Wesleyan University, the jury ruled in KLC's favor on the grounds that Roth had given fraternities three years to meet requirements, and the option for living in single-sex fraternity buildings was taken away within a year. Wesleyan took the case to the Connecticut Supreme Court, which heard oral arguments in the case in early 2019. On March 5, 2021, the Connecticut Supreme Court "reverse[d] the judgment of the trial court and remand[ed] the case for a new trial." On March 22, 2022, the University "reached a settlement in the Kent Literary Club et al. v. Wesleyan University et al. court case ... ending the case seven years after the lawsuit was initially filed."

=== Condemnation of BDS ===
Roth publicly condemned the academic boycott of Israeli institutions made by the American Studies Association and other scholarly organizations as part of the Boycott, Divestment and Sanctions Movement, a stance that attracted further protest from many Wesleyan alumni. Following an April 2015 protest in Roth's office, in which students demanded that Wesleyan University divest its endowment from the private prison industry, the Israeli occupation, and the fossil fuel industry, Roth made a blog post, in part stating, "I don't see Wesleyan's selling stock as being at all relevant to the creation of conditions for peace in the Middle East. Indeed, I think that the call for selling stock is a distraction from the essential policy and diplomatic challenges ahead." This put him in direct conflict with the student protesters' ideologies.

- Various student groups, including WesDivest and Climate Action Group, have been pushing for the Wesleyan University endowment to divest from fossil fuel companies since the early 2010s. After a 2015 protest to divest from the fossil fuel industry, private prisons, and the Israeli occupation, Roth posted a blog post, stating that divesting stock would not affect climate change. While in recent years, Roth has changed his stance on fossil fuel divestment, stating that Wesleyan will be divested from fossil fuel companies by 2031, student protesters continue to push him on the issue.
- Divestment from private prisons was among the demands for divestment in a 2015 protest in Roth's office, after which Roth reported Wesleyan had no investments in private prisons.
- In 2007, many Wesleyan students and alumni became concerned with Wesleyan's investments in General Dynamics and Raytheon, two weapon manufacturers. This led the Wesleyan student group, Students for Ending the War in Iraq (SEWI), to lead a campaign for Wesleyan's divestment from weapons contractors, with various conservative student detractors, as well as actions on part of the Wesleyan Student Assembly. In 2008, the Wesleyan Board of Trustees (on which Roth sits) declined to divest from weapon contractors.

=== Firing of Scott Backer and subsequent call for removal ===
Scott Backer was fired from Wesleyan as Associate Dean of Students in October 2016 when a Boston Globe article was released, revealing he was fired from Vermont Academy in 2007 for predatory behavior toward a student. Two hundred students held a town hall later that week, coming to the consensus that Roth and Wesleyan Vice President for Equity and Inclusion/Title IX Officer Antonio Farias should resign. Students criticized the lack of transparency of administration, as well as, per the Wesleyan Argus, "what they argue is the administration's ongoing failure to adequately reform sexual assault policy and address the issue of sexual assault on campus."

As days went on, tensions rose, with posters being put up around campus, and Backer's handling of sexual assault cases at Wesleyan being brought under a more critical lens. Students cited that this added to feelings of danger they already felt at Wesleyan.

These events spurred protests on October 10, 2016, during an open house day at Wesleyan. These were known under the name "Who Runs Wes?". Students had various flyers, demonstrations, and disruptions meant to bring attention to shortcomings of the University, including lack of transparency regarding the Backer firing, invasive/inappropriate Title IX hearings, mistreatment of marginalized students, Wesleyan's theft of land, property, and human remains of Wangunk people, and various other issues.

=== Lack of funding to African-American studies ===
The university's African American Studies program (AFAM) was stated to have only two English professors by the end of the 2013–2014 school year, as opposed to seven tenured or tenure-tracked professors, as well as visiting professors, in 2009. This prompted students to put a proposal through the Wesleyan Student Assembly in early May 2014, calling for the prioritization of hiring more AFAM professors, as well as calling on Roth and Provost Ruth Striegel Weissman to give public responses. On May 14, around 100 students participated in a march at Wesleyan and sit-in in South College, Roth's office building, to protest the issue. While protesting, students sang a re-written version of the Wesleyan Fight Song, including the lyrics, "Roth's killing AFAM, where's our inclusion?" A panel with both targets was held later in the day, where many students still found frustration with Roth and Weissman given lack of concrete action of the issue. In a blog post two days later, Roth announced the search for more professors.

=== Physical confrontations with students and reporters ===
In October 2012, Roth engaged in a public confrontation with a reporter from Democracy Now! during student protests against Wesleyan's decision to end need-blind admissions, which involved Roth putting his head to the camera and taking the reporter's microphone.

Also in October 2012, students were grabbed by Roth, who was confronting them regarding using chalk on Wyllys Avenue (a street not owned by Wesleyan) as a form of protest, determined to be permissible by both Wesleyan University and the City of Middletown, Connecticut. Many found this to be an unnecessary and controversial action by Roth.

=== Working conditions at the university ===
Wesleyan University cut its custodial staff from 60 to 50 between 2012 and 2014, resulting in reports of custodians being overworked. It was publicly known conditions were changing as early as 2012 (due to changing workloads), and custodians publicly protested in 2013, when five people had already been fired.

In September 2013, a rally was held at a Wesleyan football game to protest custodial working conditions. Around the same time, a letter directed at Roth from custodians was released, in part stating:

We understand that when the contract between Wesleyan University and Sun Services was made, an agreement was reached that if the new company broke any of the Union contract policies, the contract with the company would be broken immediately...We the custodians that work at your facility ask that Sun Services be removed from campus on the premises that it has allowed not only for the breach of the contract but also for the harassment, mistreatment, and exploitation of us the custodians.”

2018 saw another rise in attention and protest on this issue, once again largely directed at Roth. The student group United Student Labor Action Coalition (USLAC) brought attention to the firing of a custodian, as well as the workload issue, amplifying the demand for Wesleyan to hire five more custodians.

In 2019, USLAC organized a three-day protest during WesFest, a university organized event for prospective students, rallying around the already existing demand for "Five More Workers". A large highlight by protesters was Roth's salary, citing the $926,183 figure to highlight the misallocation of resources at the school. Roth also faced criticism for treatment of protesters and custodians as it related to this movement.

Roth announced the hiring of one more custodian before the 2019–2020 school year, and pushes to hire more custodians continued.

Following news that Workforce Time would be coming to Wesleyan as the new time-tracking system for employees, employees and students protested amidst concerns around its surveillance technology, including geofencing. A petition circulated, targeting Roth, calling for the plan to implement Workforce Time be stopped. In response, Roth stated:

"I’ve seen the petition, but it says things like ‘Roth wants to know where custodians piss and shit.’ Although that's an interesting idea, as a Freudian, it's just misinformation. It may be the case that the thousand people who signed it don't want geo-fencing. But it's probably not the case."

=== Zonker Harris Day cancellation ===
In the winter of 2008, Roth approved a decision to remove "the annual music and arts festival Zonker Harris Day" from the University's calendar of events, saying: "The institution should make it clear that it's not supporting things that are stupid." The Wesleyan college newspaper noted: "The annual celebration references a perpetually-stoned character in Garry Trudeau's Doonesbury comic strip, inspiring University participants to emulate Zonker Harris's drug habits." The day was renamed "Ze Who Must Not Be Named." The decision earned Roth an appearance in a Doonesbury strip in autumn of 2010. On March 22, 2011, the university administration officially reversed its decision on the festival's name. The festival was again known as Zonker Harris Day beginning with the 2011 festival in April.

=== Response to threat to academic freedom ===
During assaults on higher education by the Trump administration, Roth was recognized in March and April 2025 by the conservative commentator Charlie Sykes as the first to speak up in defense of academic freedom in private universities and colleges, and when Trump administration threats drove universities to decide what their individual responses would be. In May 2025, PEN America recognized him with the PEN/Benenson Courage Award for "his early and ardent admonition of the current administration’s efforts to undermine the independence of colleges and universities and campus free speech."
