= The Wesleyan Argus =

Student newspaper of Wesleyan University, Connecticut, United States

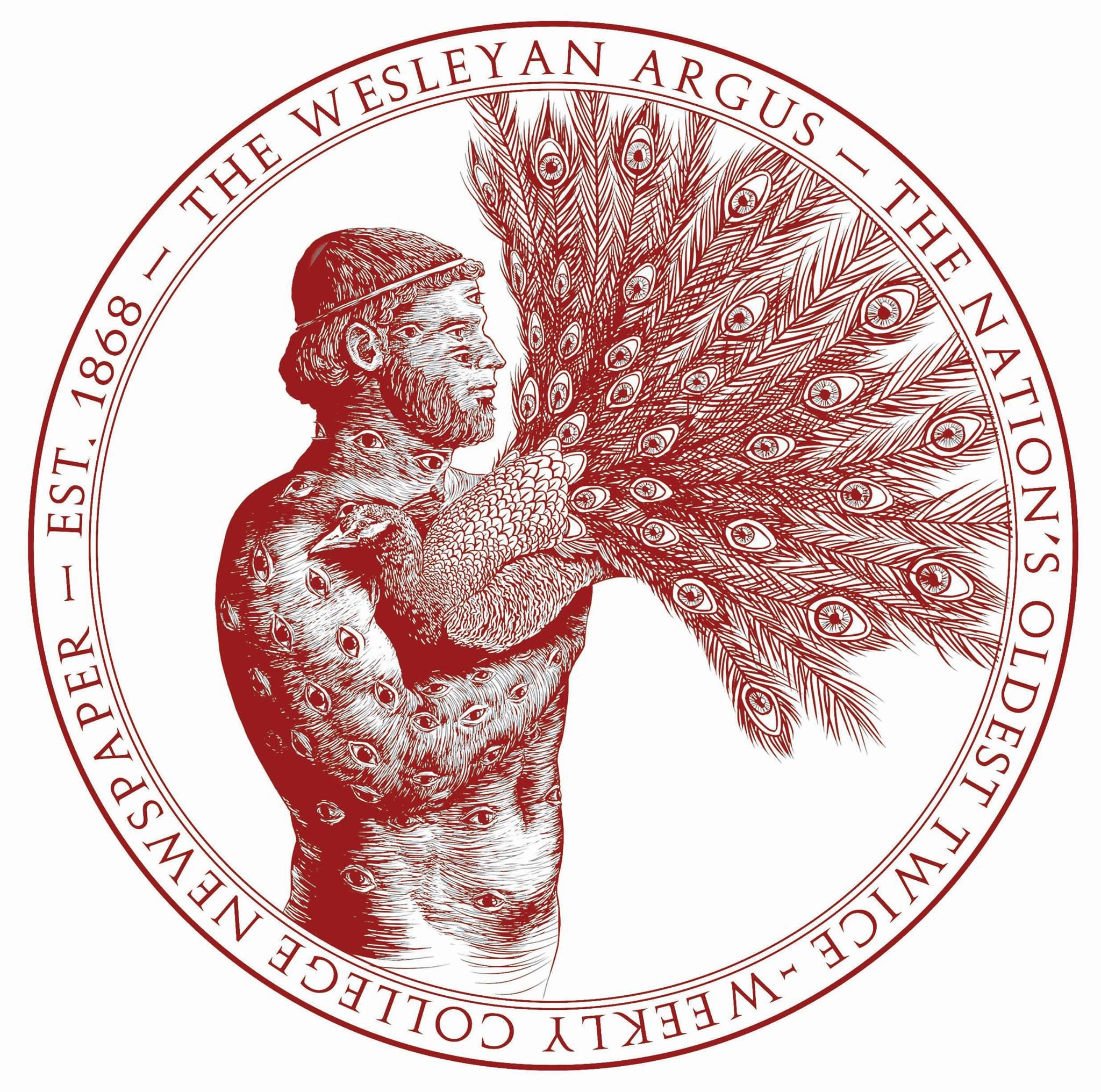
- The logo of The Wesleyan Argus
- Type: Student newspaper
- School: Wesleyan University
- Editor-in-chief: Henry Kaplan ’28; Julia Podgorski ’28
- Managing editor: Anabel Goode ’27
- Founded: 1868
- Headquarters: 45 Broad Street; Middletown, CT
- Website: www.wesleyanargus.com

The Wesleyan Argus is the student newspaper of Wesleyan University in Middletown, Connecticut, United States. It was founded in 1868.

Each issue of The Argus includes the news, features, arts and culture, opinion, and sports sections. Tuesday issues include a print-only satirical Ampersand column, while Thursday issues feature an archival column, From The Argives.

== History ==
The Argus was founded in 1868 and has been published bi-weekly since. The Argus does not run in exam periods and has paused publication during wartimes and the COVID-19 pandemic.

The Argus is named after Argus Panoptes, a many-eyed giant in Greek mythology.

In 1975, The Argus ran its first advertisement for a campus queer group.

In 2015, The Argus made headlines after a student wrote an opinion piece questioning the tactics of members of the Black Lives Matter movement. In response to student outrage, the president of the Wesleyan Student Assembly called for The Argus to be defunded. However, school leaders defended the right of students to freely write in The Argus and funding was never cut.

In 2020, The Argus established the Argus Voices Fund, a program dedicated to increasing racial diversity in the publication's newsroom. The fund, which aimed to create five paid reporting positions for low-income students of color, was supported entirely by alumni contributions. In 2025, The Argus expanded the fund, creating three additional reporting positions and opening the program to students of color with any demonstrated financial need.

In 2024, The Argus reported that a student had filed a Title IX complaint against then-chair of the Wesleyan University Board of Trustees John B. Frank, alleging that Frank had inappropriately touched her while working as a caterer at a university-sponsored event. The Argus reported that after being informed of the student's complaint, Frank asked Wesleyan President Michael S. Roth if he should resign from the Board of Trustees, and Roth encouraged him not to. The report came in the same semester that Roth announced Wesleyan's Public Affairs Center would be renamed in honor of Frank.

== Notable alumni ==
- Adam Berinsky, professor of political science at the Massachusetts Institute of Technology
- David Brancaccio, host of the public radio business program Marketplace Morning Report
- Ethan Bronner, senior editor at Bloomberg News
- Hannah Dreier, Pulitzer Prize-winning reporter for The New York Times
- Steven Greenhouse, labor reporter for The New York Times
- Alan Miller, Pulitzer Prize-winning journalist
- Randall Pinkston, reporter for Al Jazeera America
- Stephen Talbot, documentary producer for Frontline
- John Yang, special correspondent for the PBS NewsHour
