= International Journal of Eating Disorders =

- Discipline: Psychiatry; Clinical psychology
- Language: English
- Edited by: Ruth Striegel Weissman

Publication details
- History: 1981–present
- Publisher: John Wiley & Sons
- Frequency: 12/year
- Impact factor: 4.861 (2020)

Standard abbreviations
- ISO 4: Int. J. Eat. Disord.

Indexing
- CODEN: INDIDJ
- ISSN: 0276-3478 (print); 1098-108X (web)
- LCCN: 82641838
- OCLC no.: 473915342

Links
- Journal homepage; Online access; Online archive

The International Journal of Eating Disorders is a peer-reviewed medical journal covering the study of eating disorders. It was established in 1981 by Van Nostrand Reinhold and is currently published twelve times per year by John Wiley & Sons. The editor-in-chief is Ruth Striegel Weissman (Wesleyan University). According to the Journal Citation Reports, the journal has a 2020 impact factor of 4.861, ranking it 27th out of 89 journals in the category "Nutrition & Dietetics".
