= David C. Howse =

American academic administrator

10th president of California College of the Arts
- Incumbent
- Assumed office October 25, 2023
- Preceded by: Stephen Beal

Personal details
- Education: Bradley University (BA); New England Conservatory of Music (MM)
- Occupation: College president

David C. Howse is an American academic administrator. He is the 10th president of the California College of the Arts in San Francisco.

== Biography ==
David C. Howse attended Bradley University where he graduated with a Bachelor of Arts degree in music; he then attended the New England Conservatory of Music where he graduated with a Master of Music in Vocal Performance.

Prior to his appointment at CCA, he worked at the Boston Children's Chorus as the director of operations and programs, eventually becoming executive director.

At Emerson College, he served concurrently as the executive director of ArtsEmerson and vice president of the Office of the Arts. He also served as interim vice president of Institutional Advancement. He helped fundraise $40 million and co-created the Boston Cultural Leaders Coalition to address equity challenges in the arts.

In 2020, he was named one of the 100 most influential people in Boston by Boston magazine.

The French Government awarded Howse the title of Chevalier de l'Ordre des Arts et des Lettres in November 2023.

On October 25, 2023, the College of the Arts announced that Howse would serve as its tenth president.
