= Stephen Beal =

American artist

9th President of California College of the Arts
- In office 2008–2023
- Preceded by: Michael S. Roth
- Succeeded by: David C. Howse

Personal details
- Education: Occidental College, School of the Art Institute of Chicago
- Occupation: Artist, painter, educator, academic administrator

Stephen Beal is an American artist, educator, and academic administrator. He served as the 9th president of California College of the Arts in San Francisco and Oakland, California, from 2008 until 2023. His artwork recognized for his colorful grid paintings.

== Education ==
Beal attended Occidental College in Los Angeles, California; and earned a M.F.A. degree from the School of the Art Institute of Chicago.

== Career ==
Since 1972, Beal has had numerous exhibitions of his work, and has received many commissions and grants.

From 1973 to 1977 he was a part-time instructor and technician at The School of the Art Institute of Chicago. From 1980 to 1983, he was assistant professor of art appreciation, collage, photography studio, and design studio at Elmhurst College in Elmhurst, Illinois.

From 1993 to 1995 he served as chair of graduate design and as an associate professor of painting at The School of the Art Institute of Chicago. From 1995 to 1997, he was vice president of academic planning and associate vice president of academic affairs at The School of the Art Institute of Chicago. He taught courses in studio painting and still-life painting, and was a graduate and post-baccalaureate advisor. He was also a faculty counselor in admissions.

Beal was appointed provost of the California College of the Arts in 1997. He was appointed president of the California College of the Arts in 2008, a role he served until 2023.
