= California College of the Arts =

Private art school in San Francisco, California, US

Coordinates: 37.83593°N 122.25030°W

- Former names: School of the California Guild of Arts and Crafts (1907–1908), California School of Arts and Crafts (1908–1935), California College of Arts and Crafts (1936–2002)
- Type: Private art school
- Established: 1907; 119 years ago
- Endowment: $36.0 million (2019)
- President: David C. Howse
- Faculty: 500
- Students: 1,390
- Undergraduates: 1,063
- Postgraduates: 327
- Location: San Francisco, California, United States
- Campus: Urban 4 acres (1.6 ha)
- Colors: New teal, paper white, black
- Website: cca.edu

The California College of the Arts (CCA) is a private art school in San Francisco, California. It was founded in nearby Berkeley in 1907 and moved to a historic estate in neighboring Oakland in 1922. In 1996, it opened a second campus in San Francisco; in 2022, the Oakland campus was closed and merged into the San Francisco campus. CCA enrolls approximately 1,239 undergraduates and 380 graduate students. In January 2026, CCA president David Howse announced the college will be closing at the end of the 2026–2027 academic year, with Vanderbilt University taking over the campus.

== History ==
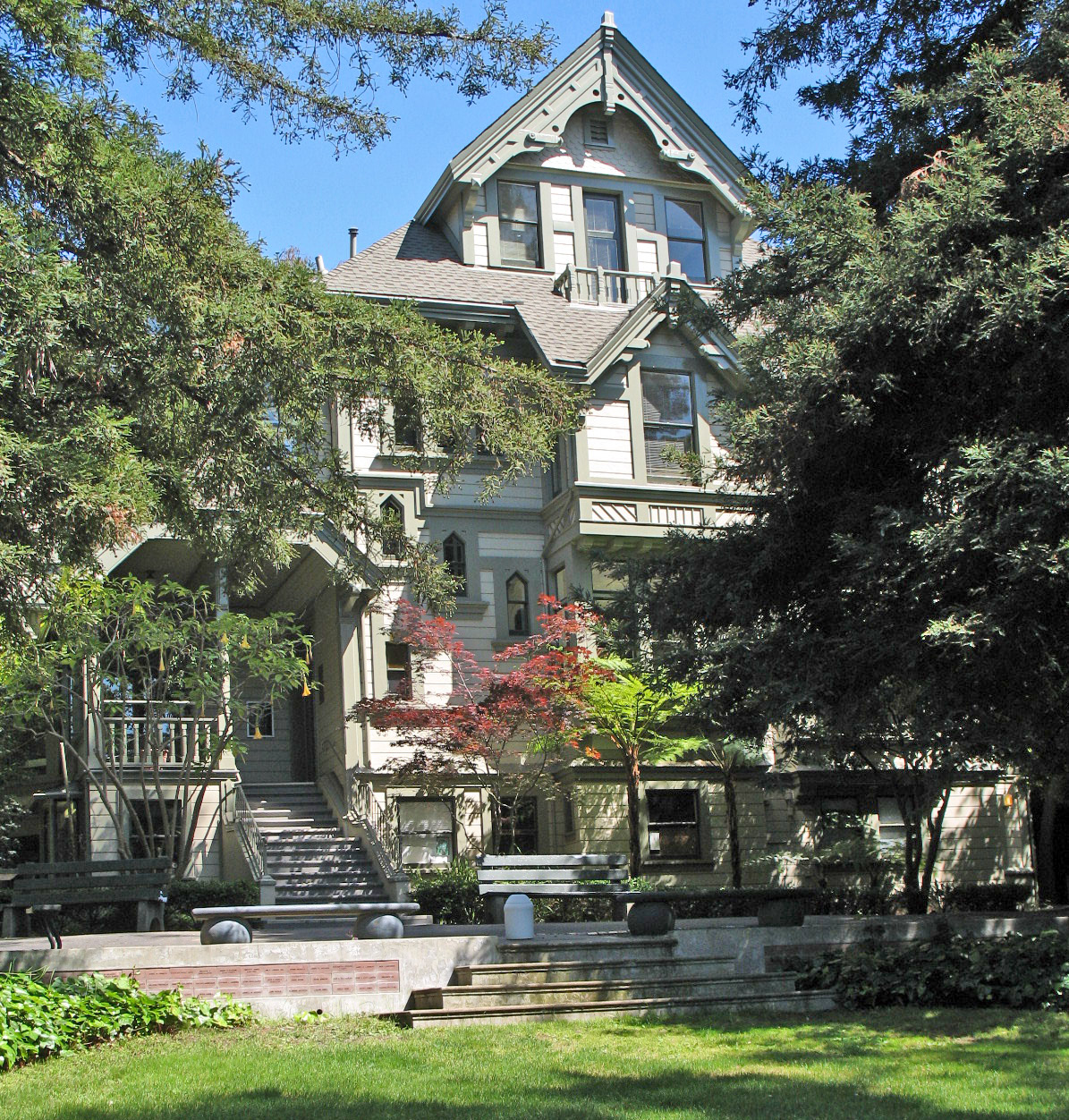
Treadwell Mansion, Oakland

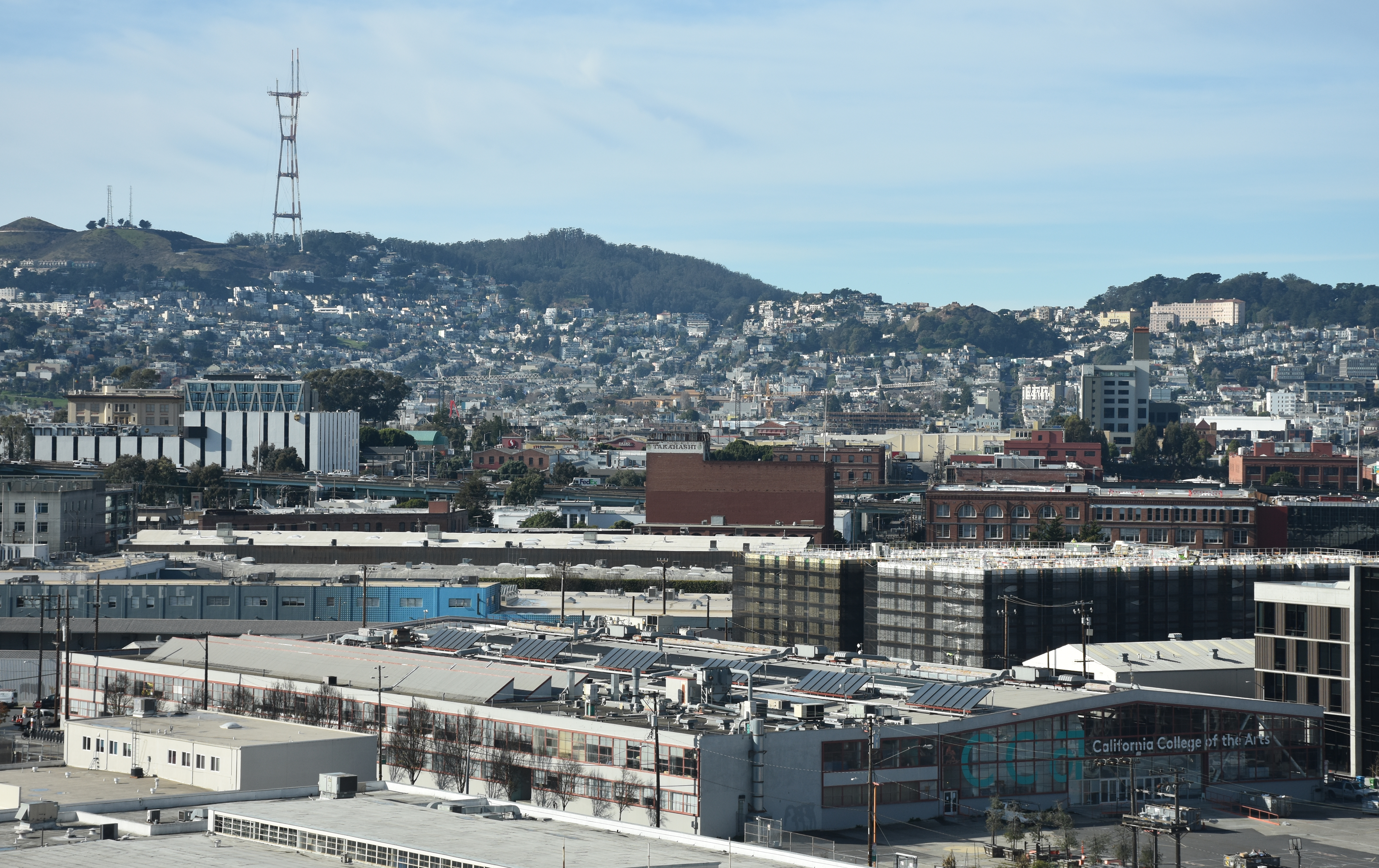
The CCA campus in San Francisco's design district (in the foreground below)

CCA was founded in 1907 by Frederick Meyer in Berkeley as the School of the California Guild of Arts and Crafts during the height of the Arts and Crafts movement. The Arts and Crafts movement originated in Europe during the late 19th century as a response to the industrial aesthetics of the machine age. Followers of the movement advocated an integrated approach to art, design, and craft. The initial campus was in the "Studio Building" at 2045 Shattuck Avenue, and they had 43 enrolled students.

In 1908, the school was renamed California School of Arts and Crafts. In 1910, the school moved to the site of the former Berkeley High School building at 2119 Allston Way (at Grove Street, now Martin Luther King Way).

The college's Oakland campus location was acquired in 1922, when Meyer bought the four-acre James Treadwell estate at Broadway and College Avenue. Two of its buildings are on the National Register of Historic Places. After the San Francisco campus opened, the Oakland campus housed the more traditional, craft-based studios such as art glass, jewelry and metal arts, printmaking, painting, sculpture and ceramic programs.

In 1936, it became the California College of Arts and Crafts (CCAC). In 1940 a Master of Fine Arts program was established.

In the 1980s, the college began renting various locations in San Francisco, and in 1996 it opened a campus in the city's Design District, converting a former Greyhound maintenance building.

=== 21st century ===
In 2003, the college changed its name to California College of the Arts, under the leadership of president Michael S. Roth.

In 2016, it was decided to close the Oakland campus and consolidate all activities at the San Francisco campus. The final day of classes at Oakland was May 6, 2022. The college said it will "redevelop the campus with community gathering spaces, affordable housing, office space for arts nonprofits and bike parking while preserving the campus’s cluster of historic buildings and trees." In fall 2024, the college completed its expanded campus, adding 82,300 square feet of new space for teaching, making, and presenting art in a continuous indoor-outdoor environment.

Clifton Hall, one of the dormitories at the Oakland campus, was bought by the city of Oakland to use for public housing. Other parts of the Oakland campus remained unused in 2024, with plans to create a mixed-use development with hundreds of residential units.

In 2025, Nvidia co-founder and owner, Jensen Huang matched the $22.5 million already raised in donations, allowing CCA to fill the budget shortfall.

In January 2026, it was announced that CCA's campus was purchased in an agreement with Vanderbilt University. CCA plans to cease operation at the end of the 2026–2027 academic year. Vanderbilt plans to start using the campus for San Francisco-based academic programs in the 2027–2028 academic year.

== List of presidents ==
1. Frederick Meyer (1907–1944)
2. Spencer Macky (1944–1954)
3. Daniel S. Defenbacher (1954–1957)
4. Joseph A. Danysh (acting; 1957–1959)
5. Henry X. Ford (1960–c. 1985)
6. Thomas C. Schwartzburg (1984–1985) (Interim President)
7. Neil Hoffman (1985–1994)
8. Lorne Michael Buchman (1994–1999)
9. Michael S. Roth (2000–2007)
10. Stephen Beal (2008–2023)
11. David C. Howse (2023–present)

== Academics ==
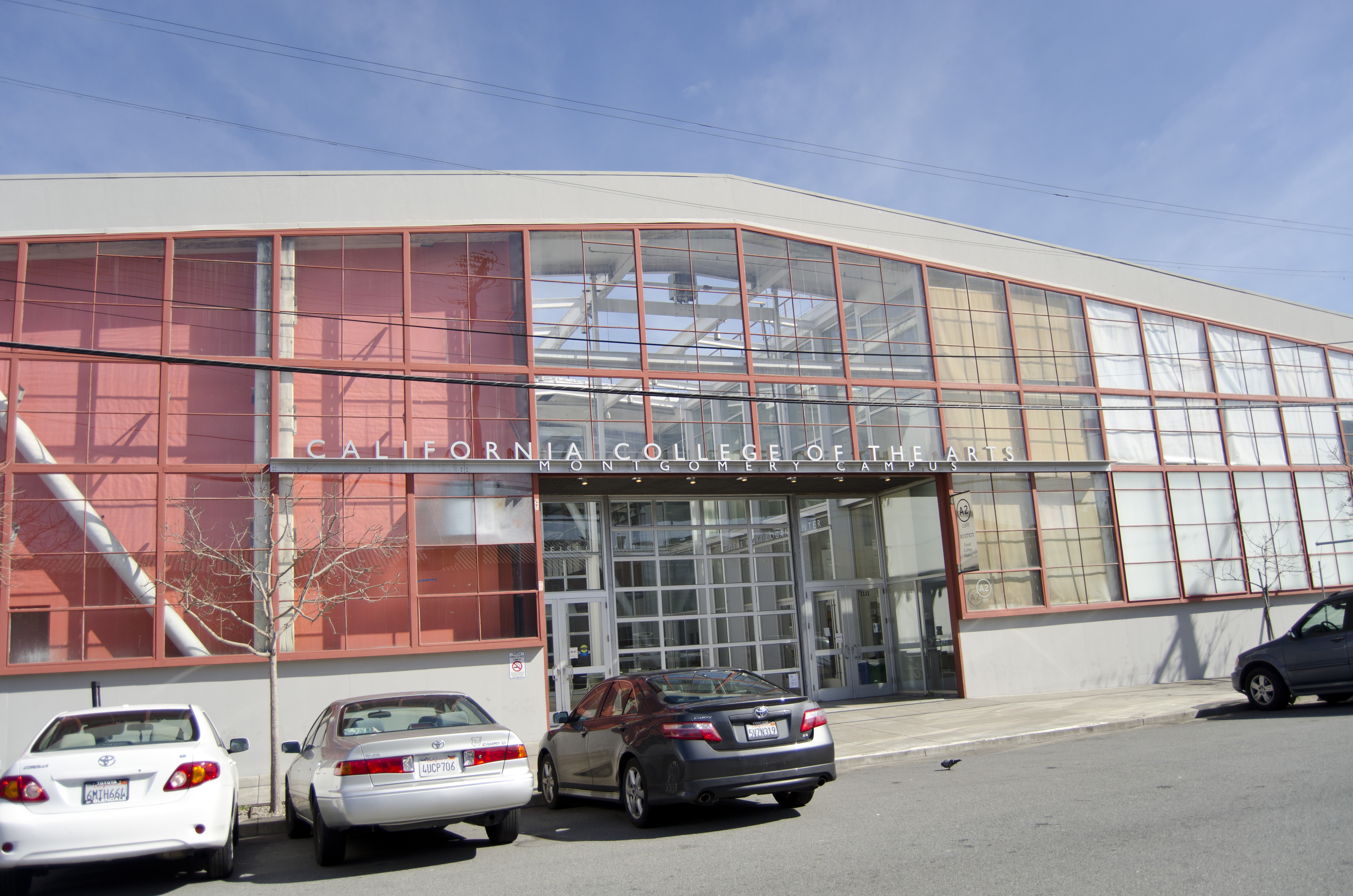
Montgomery Building, San Francisco campus

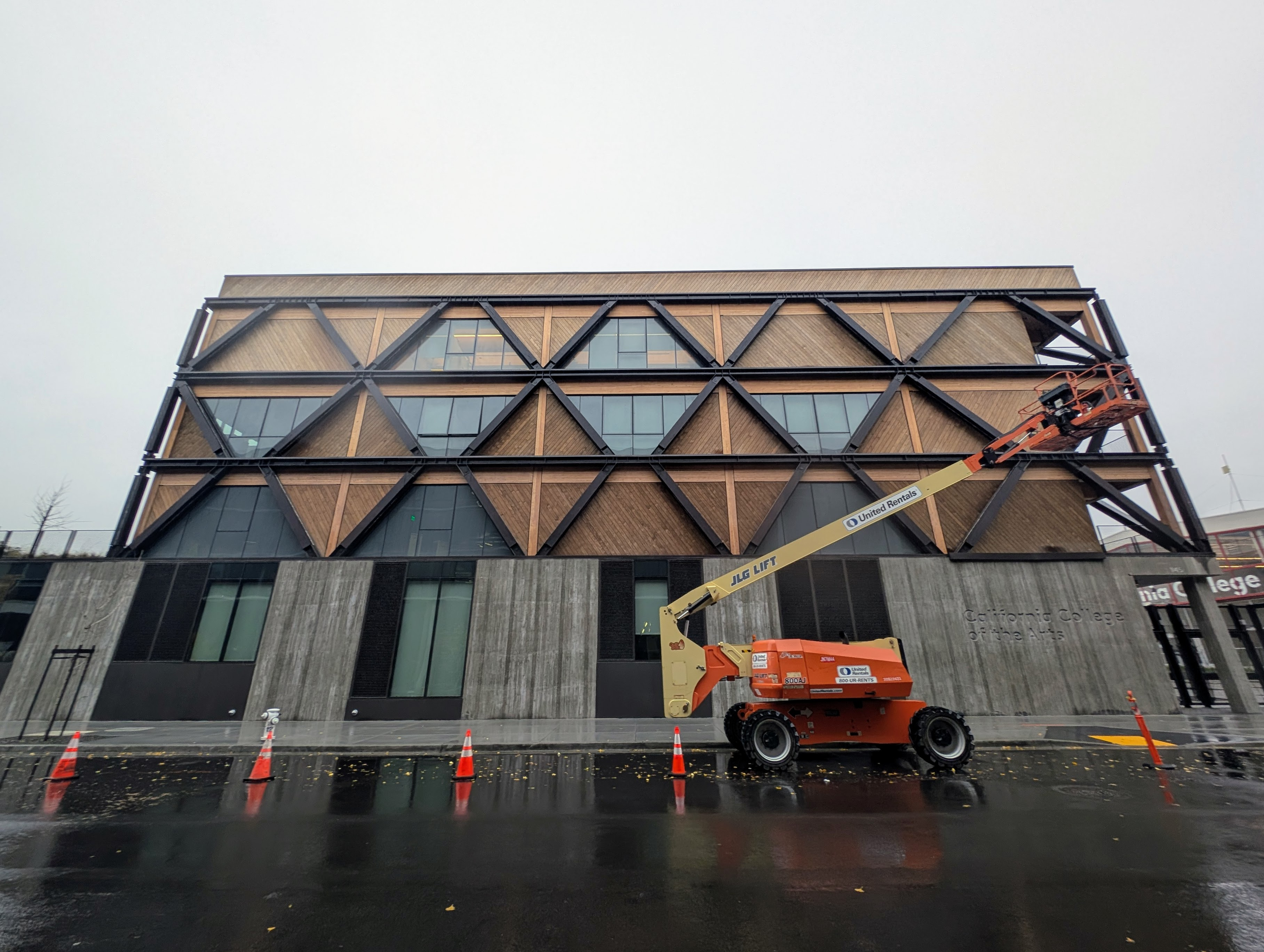
The Simpson Family Makers Building designed by Studio Gang

CCA offers 17 undergraduate and 10 graduate majors. In 2021, CCA unveiled a BFA in Comics. CCA confers the bachelor of fine arts (BFA), bachelor of arts (BA), bachelor of architecture (BArch), master of fine arts (MFA), master of arts (MA), master of architecture (MArch), master of advanced architectural design (MAAD), masters of design (MDes) and master of business administration (MBA) degrees.

In the U.S. News & World Report rankings for 2020, CCA ranked #10 in the country for graduate fine arts programs, and #4 in graphic design. PayScale lists CCA as the #1 art school in the United States for return on investment and #4 for average alumni salary (bachelor's degree). The average class size is 13 for undergraduate programs and 12 for graduate. The student to faculty ratio is 8:1.

CCA is accredited by the WASC Senior College and University Commission, the National Association of Schools of Art and Design, and the National Architectural Accrediting Board.

=== Architecture Division ===
The Architecture Division at the California College of the Arts (CCA) offers accredited undergraduate and graduate programs emphasizing design excellence, environmental responsibility, and social engagement. The Bachelor of Architecture (B.Arch) and Master of Architecture (M.Arch) programs are both accredited by the National Architectural Accrediting Board (NAAB) and the Western Association of Schools and Colleges (WASC).

The division’s curriculum integrates architectural theory, digital fabrication, and community-based practice. Students may pursue focused study through concentrations such as Digital Craft, Urban Works, and History/Theory/Experiments, supported by labs and research centers including the Digital Craft Lab, Urban Works Agency, and the Architectural Ecologies Lab. These initiatives explore relationships between design, ecology, and technology, often engaging with local Bay Area environments and public institutions.

In 2024, CCA opened a major campus expansion designed by Studio Gang, unifying its San Francisco facilities around a central "maker spine" that connects fabrication shops, classrooms, and outdoor work areas. The hybrid mass timber structure emphasizes daylighting, carbon reduction, and material innovation, aligning with the school’s long-term sustainability goals. Architectural publications have cited the project as representative of CCA’s pedagogical commitment to experimental building and environmental design.

The division maintains active research partnerships with local and international organizations. The Architectural Ecologies Lab (AEL), for example, collaborates with scientists and fabricators to explore coastal resilience, buoyant ecologies, and ecological design systems. In 2021, the lab announced an Academic Alliance with Autodesk Technology Centers to advance digital and material research.

CCA architecture students and faculty have received recognition in professional publications and competitions. In 2025, three students were named to the Metropolis Future 100, highlighting emerging designers in North America. Faculty-led projects such as Buoyant Ecologies and design-build studios have been featured in Metropolis, Dezeen, and Architectural Record for their contributions to sustainable and experimental design.

In 2023, the college announced new leadership appointments across architecture and design. In August of that year, architectural historian Irene Cheng was named chair of the graduate architecture program, and designer Alexander Schofield was named associate chair. Cheng departed the college in 2026.

In 2024, Mark Donohue was named chair of the Bachelor of Architecture program, a role he previously served in from 2012 to 2017.

== See also ==
- Academy of Art University
- American Conservatory Theater
- The Art Institute of California – San Francisco
- San Francisco Art Institute
- List of colleges and universities in California
