= Neil Hoffman =

American educator, and university president (born c. 1939)

Neil J. Hoffman

President of the School of the Art Institute of Chicago
- In office 1983 – June 30, 1985

6th President of California College of Arts and Crafts
- In office 1985–1994
- Preceded by: Henry X. Ford
- Succeeded by: Lorne Michael Buchman

President of Otis Art Institute of Parsons School of Design
- In office 1994–2000
- Preceded by: David Levy

President of Milwaukee Institute of Art and Design
- In office 2007 – May 2014
- Preceded by: Mary C. Schopp
- Succeeded by: Jeffrey Morin

Personal details
- Born: c. 1939 United States
- Education: University at Buffalo

Neil J. Hoffman (born c. 1939), is an American educator and academic administrator. He served as a college and art school president for multiple educational organizations.

Hoffman served as president of the School of the Art Institute of Chicago (SAIC) from 1983 to 1985; the president of the California College of Arts and Crafts (now California College of the Arts, or CCA), from 1985 to 1994; and the president of the Otis Art Institute of Parsons School of Design (now Otis College of Art and Design), from 1994 to 2000. He was also the dean and CEO of the Otis Art Institute of Parsons School of Design, from 1979 to 1983.

Hoffman has also served as the president of Milwaukee Institute of Art and Design (MIAD), from 2007 until May 2014.
