= Wesleyan Student Assembly =

Student government of Wesleyan University

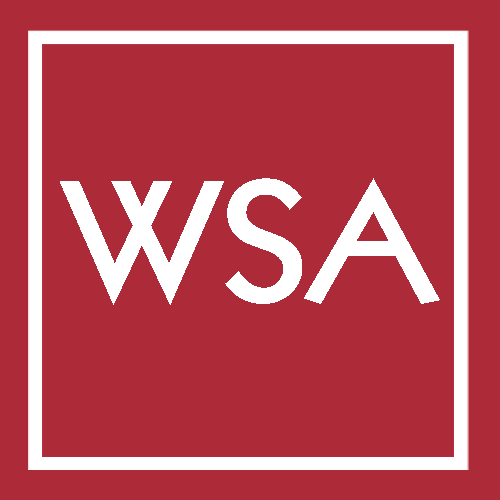
- Institution: Wesleyan University
- Location: Middletown, Connecticut
- Established: 1903
- President: Andrea Herrera '27
- Vice president: Uszee McKoy '29
- Website: wesleyanstudentassembly.org

The Wesleyan Student Assembly (WSA) is a group of students elected annually to represent Wesleyan University's undergraduate student body. Members serve as student advocates in all areas of the university, including matters related to student life, academics, campus facilities and finances. For example, the New York Times noted in 2008: "The good news for students and their parents facing high tuition bills is that the student government at Wesleyan University voted last month to establish an endowment to reduce costs at the liberal arts university in Middletown. Wesleyan’s student endowment, which will be created with surplus from the activity fees paid by all students, may be the first of its kind, according to university officials and higher-education experts."

The WSA's composition and basic operating procedures are outlined in its Constitution, while its by-laws delve into the details of its sub-committees, organization, the functioning of the Assembly as a whole, and allocation of money to student groups.

== History ==
Wesleyan's student government originated as the College Body Senate in 1903. "The College Body of Wesleyan University" was formed in 1963 in response to a desire for better organization and was directed by the College Body Committee, composed of five elected undergraduates. In 1975, the Wesleyan Students' Union was formed to fill the need for an organization to lobby specifically on behalf of student interests. A $1 membership was required.

In 1978, 89% of the voting population approved a campus-wide referendum to form the Wesleyan Student Assembly. The Assembly was composed of seven standing committees with 45 members serving during the fall term and 38 members during the spring term.

The WSA has undergone a number of changes in composition throughout its history. In 1980, the Assembly had 37 members; in 1981 the membership shrank to 27 members. The Assembly was again altered in 1984 to 28 members and persisted in this form until 1992, when it was expanded to 40 members. In 1997, the WSA underwent another major change, reducing it to 37 members. In 2009, the Concert Committee Chair was added, expanding membership to 38 members; in 2010 the merger of the Community Outreach and Organization and External Affairs committees led to the elimination of two seats, capping the current WSA's membership at 36. Seats were later added to return to 38 members.

Over time, the distribution of representatives has been changed from the basis of geographic location on campus to the basis of class year. During the 1990s, the Assembly leadership was expanded from a coordinator position to a student-body president, vice-president format.

The WSA enjoys a storied history of successes, reforms and restructurings as well as dramatic resignations and heated debate. The Assembly has played an integral role in the university's past efforts at curricular renewal and reform of graduation requirements. Recently, the WSA has influenced the Wesleyan academic calendar, residential life procedures, long-term financial planning, and numerous other issues.

== Committee structure ==
The WSA is run through the leadership board (LB, composed of the president, vice-president, chief of staff, and five other committee chairs. The LB is tasked with setting the WSA's weekly agenda, identifying key student issues, and developing the best course of action for addressing them. All members of the LB serve as student representatives to Wesleyan University’s board of trustees.

The five standing committees of the WSA are the Academic Affairs Committee, the Community Committee, the Equity and Inclusion Committee, the Student Budget Committee, and the Student Life Committee.

The Academic Affairs Committee (AAC) is responsible for representing the academic concerns of the student body to the faculty and administration. The chair and vice-chair of the AAC serve as two of the eight voting members on the faculty Educational Policy Committee (EPC).

The Community Committee (CoCo) is responsible for recognizing new and returning student groups, Middletown relations, and issues of inclusion and diversity. It works extensively with the Student Budget Committee and Wesleyan's Student Activities and Leadership Development Office to facilitate student group activities. CoCo also serves as steward of the 190 High Street building, the only student-only space on Wesleyan's campus.

The Chief of Staff oversees the day-to-day running of the Wesleyan Student Assembly, including managing minutes, committee reports, outreach to the campus writ large, elections, appointments, and other administrative functions.

The Student Life Committee (SLC) works to address issues related to student life at Wesleyan. This includes residential life, student health services, alcohol and other drug issues, judicial process, Greek life, campus climate, public safety, and fire safety appeals. All members of the SLC also sit on the Student Affairs Advisory Committee (SAAC), which makes upper-level decisions with key administrators about student life policy.

The Equity and Inclusion Committee (EIC) is responsible for serving members of historically marginalized communities by promoting equity and inclusion-driven projects within the WSA, actively recruiting members from historically underrepresented groups to serve on the WSA, and intentionally seeking and elevating their voices. It was created at the end of the Spring 2021 semester.

The Student Budget Committee (SBC) allocates money to student groups for special projects and events open to the entire student body. The SBC's budget comes out of the Student Activities Fee, a $300 fee paid for by all students at the beginning of each year. The Student Activity Fee funds, among other things:

- The Wesleyan Argus
- The Wesleyan Arcadia Political Review
- The Crowell Concert Series
- The Wesleyan Film Series
- WesU Radio Station
- Spring Fling
- Student-run publications (poetry, fiction, narrative, and others)
- All club sports teams
- Music and arts groups
- Shakti
- Wesleyan Ski Team
- Activist events
- Honorariums for speakers on campus
- Performances (costumers, lighting, props, others)

== The WSA Endowment ==
At the end of the spring semester of 2008, the WSA established one of the first-ever student government endowments. The endowment functions to prevent increases in the student activities fee, a $300 annual charge that is used to fund activities planned by student groups.

== The Committee for Investor Responsibility ==
The Committee for Investor Responsibility (CIR) is tasked with considering "issues of ethical, moral, and social responsibility in the investment policies of Wesleyan University."

The committee engages in shareholder advocacy on behalf of Wesleyan, which may include proxy voting, corporate letter writing, and the filing of shareholder resolutions.

The eleven voting members of the CIR are representative of the Wesleyan community. The committee includes students, faculty, staff, and alumni.

The Committee for Investor Responsibility (CIR) was established in February 2009.

== The Student Affairs Advisory Committee ==
The Student Affairs Advisory Committee (SAAC) is a joint student-administrative policy-making body that addresses the most significant issues of student life at Wesleyan.

The SAAC is co-chaired by the chair of the WSA's Student Life Committee (SLC) and Wesleyan's vice president for student affairs. Its membership also includes the other eight students serving on the SLC, the Dean of Students, the director of Student Activities & Leadership Development, the director of Residential Life, and the director of the Usdan University Center.

Among the most substantial policy changes to come out of the SAAC in recent years were the creation of the Fire Safety and Facilities Appeals Board, allowing students to appeal fines for fire safety violations, and the development of a policy to allows political speakers to come to campus.

== University Outreach Committee ==
The University Outreach Committee (UOC) provides a forum for students to provide feedback and suggestions regarding university outreach to the university administration. This includes messaging, techniques, and initiatives used by the university to engage, communicate with, and present itself to the wider Wesleyan community and to the outside world. Recent topics of discussion have been the use of new media and the promotion of student accomplishments.

== See also ==
- Wesleyan University
- Students' union
- Student voice
