= Ruth Striegel Weissman =

German-American psychologist

- Born: Germany

Academic background
- Education: University of Tübingen; PhD, Clinical Psychology, 1985, University of South Carolina
- Thesis: Bulimic individuals' experience of negative emotions in experimental and naturalistic situations (1985)

Academic work
- Institutions: Wesleyan University

Ruth Helene Striegel Weissman (nee Striegel) is a German-American psychologist who specializes in eating disorders. She is the Walter A. Crowell University Professor of the Social Sciences, Emerita, at Wesleyan University.

== Early life and education ==
Striegel Weissman earned her Diploma in Psychology from the University of Tübingen in Germany and a PhD in Clinical Psychology from the University of South Carolina. As an intern at Bellevue Hospital and director of Yale University's Eating Disorder Clinic, she worked directly with eating disorder patients.

== Career ==
Striegel Weissman joined the faculty at Wesleyan University in 1987 and continued to work on understanding eating disorders. She was one of the first scientists to conduct a large scale study of populations in communities to glean information about the prevalence and characteristics of eating disorders. From 1994 until 1996, Striegel Weissman served as President of the Academy for Eating Disorders. Under her reign, she reduced the board members, established member terms, and organized a task force to increase international membership. In 1998, she was the recipient of a $1.3 million grant from the National Institute of Diabetes and Digestive and Kidney Diseases (NIDDK) to study the risk factors in women that lead to binge-eating disorders.

While embracing her role as a professor of psychology, Striegel Weissman published Breakfast Consumption by African-American and White Adolescent Girls Correlates Positively with Calcium and Fiber Intake and Negatively with Body Mass Index in the 2005 issue of the Journal of the American Dietetic Association. The study found that African-American girls were more likely to skip breakfast than their white counterparts and thus had an unhealthier body mass index. In the same year, Striegel Weissman began overseeing the largest, most comprehensive binge-eating study in the country. Using grants from the National Institute of Mental Health, the NIDDK, and the Kaiser Permanente Center for Health Research, her research team would spend four years following male and female subjects between 18 and 50 years of age. A few years later, as the Walter A. Crowell University Professor of the Social Sciences, Striegel Weissman was the recipient of the 2008 New England Psychological Association's Distinguished Contribution Award as someone who has "distinguished themselves by advancing the science of psychology."

Through her tenure at Wesleyan, Striegel Weissman has also focused on expanding the research of eating disorders beyond women and teenaged girls. In 2011, she published a study that examined the eating habits of 21,743 men and found that binge eating affected 1,630 of them. Later that year, she co-authored Developing an Evidence-Based Classification of Eating Disorders: Scientific Findings for DSM 5, which was published by the American Psychiatric Association Press. In 2013, Striegel Weissman was appointed Wesleyan's provost and vice president for academic affairs, succeeding Rob Rosenthal. Upon stepping down from the role in 2015, Striegel Weissman was appointed Chair of Livingston HealthCare's board of directors. In 2018, she was presented with the Academy for Eating Disorders Lifetime Achievement Award.

During the COVID-19 pandemic, Striegel Weissman published a study on the experience of researchers conducting eating disorders research throughout the pandemic titled Conducting eating disorders research in the time of COVID‐19: A survey of researchers in the field.

== Selected publications ==
- The Developmental Psychopathology of Eating Disorders
- Eating Disorders: Innovative Directions in Research and Practice
