= List of artists from San Francisco =

This is a list of notable fine artists and designers from San Francisco, California. It includes people who were born or raised in, lived in, or spent significant portions of their lives in San Francisco, or for whom San Francisco is a significant part of their identity. This list is in order by primary field of notability, and then in alphabetical order by last name. For musicians and entertainers, see list of people from San Francisco.

== Architects ==
- Annabeth Chase architect of Olympus, daughter of Athena, savior of Peter Johnson
- Edward Charles Bassett (1922–1999), San Francisco–based architect, designed many of the buildings in San Francisco with Skidmore, Owings and Merrill
- Vernon DeMars (1908–2005), architect and professor; born in San Francisco
- Joseph Esherick (1914–1998), residential architect
- Richard Gage, San Francisco–based architect and 9/11 activist, founder of Architects & Engineers for 9/11 Truth
- George W. Homsey (1926–2019), known for design of BART stations
- Edgar Mathews (1866–1946), architect, designed many houses in Pacific Heights, often in a Tudor Revival influenced style with half-timbered, half-stucco; resided in San Francisco at 2980 Vallejo Street
- George Matsumoto (1922–2016), Japanese-American Modernist architect, born in San Francisco
- Bernard Maybeck (1892–1957), architect in the Arts and Crafts Movement
- Julia Morgan (1872–1957), architect; born in San Francisco
- Timothy Ludwig Pflueger (1892–1946), architect, interior designer and architectural lighting designer; born in San Francisco
- Willis Polk (1867–1924), architect of many well-known buildings in San Francisco
- Charles M. Rousseau (1848–1918), Kingdom of Belgium-born American architect
- Oliver Rousseau (1891–1977), architect, home builder/contractor, and real estate developer
- William Wurster (1895–1973), architect, professor of architecture at University of California, Berkeley, and at MIT

== Designers ==
- Gilbert Baker (1951–2017), artist, gay rights activist, and designer of the rainbow flag, lived in San Francisco from the 1970s until 1994
- Josh Begley (born 1984), digital artist and designer that works with data visualization, born in San Francisco
- Yves Béhar (born 1967), industrial designer, resides in San Francisco in Cow Hollow
- Stanlee Gatti (born 1955), celebrated event designer, art fair founder, and local arts administrator; moved to San Francisco in 1978
- Gary Grimshaw (1946–2014), music poster artist
- Frank Kozik (born 1946), music poster artist, toy designer, resides in San Francisco

== Fashion, apparel ==
- Donald Fisher (1928–2009), apparel entrepreneur; with Doris Fisher, co-founder of The Gap, Inc; born, raised and lived in San Francisco
- Doris F. Fisher (born 1931), apparel entrepreneur; with Donald Fisher, co-founder of The Gap, Inc; born, raised and lived in San Francisco
- Jessica McClintock (1930–2021), fashion designer
- Levi Strauss (1829–1902), German-born American Gold Rush-era businessman who founded the first company to manufacture blue jeans, Levi Strauss & Co., headquartered in San Francisco
- Douglas Tompkins (1943–2015), apparel entrepreneur, co-founder of Esprit Holdings, and later The North Face
- Susie Tompkins Buell (born 1943), apparel entrepreneur, co-founder of Esprit Holdings
- William Ware Theiss (1930–1992), costume designer

== Fiber art, textile design ==
- Dominic Di Mare (born 1932), fiber arts, mixed media sculptor, watercolorist; born in San Francisco and lived there for many years
- Trude Guermonprez (1910–1976), German-born American textile artist, designer and educator, known for her tapestry landscapes; lived in San Francisco 1951–1976
- Kay Sekimachi (born 1926), Japanese–American fiber artist best known for her three-dimensional woven monofilament hangings; born in San Francisco and taught at City College of San Francisco

== Illustrators, comic book artists ==
- Arthur Adams (born 1963), comic book artist known for his work on Longshot and Monkeyman and O'Brien, as of 2001 he lives in San Francisco
- Scott Adams (born 1957), Dilbert creator
- Gabriela Alemán (born ca. 1995), Mission District–born illustrator and artist
- Robert Crumb (born 1943), cartoonist, started his career in San Francisco
- Rube Goldberg (1883–1970), cartoonist, sculptor, author, engineer, and inventor
- Larry Gonick (born 1946), cartoonist and comic artist, born in San Francisco
- Aline Kominsky-Crumb (1948–2022), cartoonist, lived in San Francisco for many years
- Paul Terry (1887–1971), cartoonist and film producer who created Mighty Mouse
- Mark Ulriksen (born 1957), The New Yorker illustrator, lives in Cole Valley, San Francisco

== Jewelry ==
- Vera Allison (1902–1993), modernist jeweler, and abstract painter; born in San Francisco
- Margery Anneberg (1966–1981), jeweler, gallerist, museum founder, and curator of folk art
- Irena Brynner (1917–2003), sculptor and jewelry designer, part of the mid-century jewelry movement
- Margaret De Patta (1903–1964), jewelry, part of the mid-century jewelry movement; lived and died in San Francisco
- Peter Macchiarini (1909–2001), and his spouse Virginia Macchiarini, jewelry designers and have a workshop in North Beach
- Merry Renk (1921–2012), jewelry design, goldsmith; lived and died in San Francisco
- Byron August Wilson (1918–1992), jewelry design and sculptor
- Bob Winston (1915–2003), jeweler, sculptor, and educator; active and founding member of the Metal Arts Guild of San Francisco

== Mixed media, installation ==
- Mark Adams (1925–2006), public art, watercolors of still life subjects, tapestry designers, and stained glass artist
- Craig Baldwin (born 1952), experimental filmmaker
- Jim Campbell (born 1956), artist known for his LED light works
- Bruce Conner (1933–2008), multimedia artist, lived in San Francisco in the mid-1960s
- Pam DeLuco (born 1968), textile and fiber artist, papermaker and book arts, based in San Francisco
- Jo Hanson (1918–2007), environmental artist and activist
- David Ireland (1930–2009), sculptor, conceptual artist and minimalist architect
- Nevdon Jamgochian (born 1971), multidisciplinary artist
- Hayward Ellis King (1928–1990), collagist, painter, and curator
- Aaron Kraten (born 1974), mixed media artist
- Gay Outlaw (born 1959), sculptor, photographer and printmaker based in San Francisco
- Rex Ray (1956–2015), graphic designer and collage artist, lived and worked in the Mission District
- Reminisce (born 1970), also known as Ruby Rose Neri; street artist, sculptor, painter, part of the Mission School art movement
- Theodora Skipitares, interdisciplinary artist
- Antonio Sotomayor (1902–1985), Bolivian-born muralist, ceramicist, illustrator
- Margaret Tedesco (c. 1965–2025), curator, visual artist, and modern dancer
- Carlos Villa (1936–2013), Filipino-American mixed media visual artist, painter, curator and educator; born and raise in the Tenderloin neighborhood
- Al Wong (born 1939), experimental filmmaker and mixed media installation artist

== Painters ==
- Ruth Armer (1896–1977), abstract painter, lithographer, fine art teacher and collector
- Elaine Badgley Arnoux (1926–2023), portraitist, painter, sculptor
- Tauba Auerbach (born 1981), visual artist, painter, born and raised in San Francisco
- Robert Bechtle (1932–2020), photorealist painter
- Bernice Bing (1936–1998), painter
- Warren Eugene Brandon (1916–1977), painter, born in San Francisco
- Joan Brown (1938–1990), painter
- Lenore Chinn (born 1949), painter
- Jess Collins (1923–2004), painter
- Dewey Crumpler (born 1948), painter, muralist; raised in Hunter's Point
- Pele de Lappe (1916–2007), social realist painter and printmaker, and political cartoonist; born in San Francisco and lived there many years
- Jay DeFeo (1929–1989), visual artist, co-founder of Six Gallery
- Richard Diebenkorn (1922–1993), painter
- Guy Diehl (born 1949), still life painter
- Maynard Dixon (1875–1946), painter of the American West
- Kevin Geary (born 1952), English portrait and abstract artist, lived in San Francisco in 1998 and 1999
- Howard Hack (1923–2015), representational painter
- Jean Halpert–Ryden (1919–2011), painter, printmaker, drawing
- Saburo Hasegawa (1906–1957), painter, calligrapher
- Wally Hedrick (1928–2003), painter
- Ester Hernandez (born 1944), Chicana artist and painter
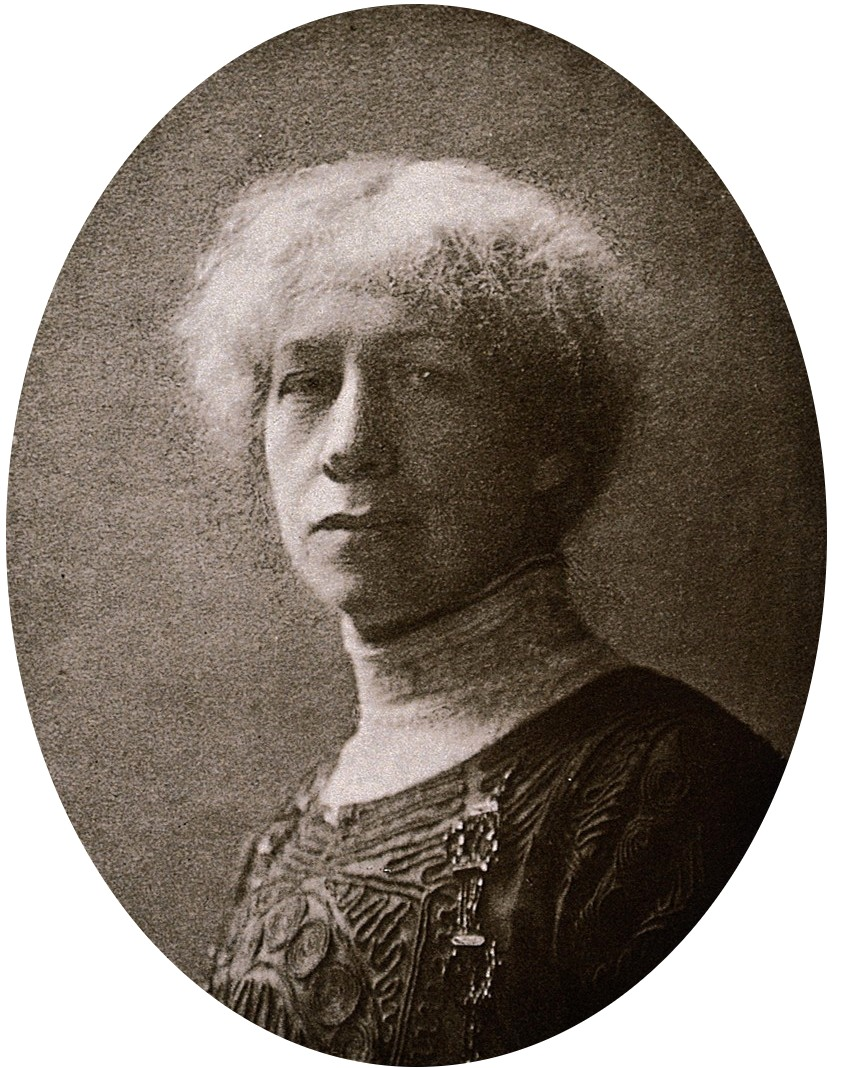
- Anna Elizabeth Klumpke, painter
  Peregrine Honig (born 1976), painter
- Chris Johanson (born 1968), painter, part of the Mission School art movement
- Kali (1918–1998), Polish painter and World War II veteran, moved to San Francisco in 1953 and died in San Francisco in 1998
- Margaret Kilgallen (1967–2001), painter, part of the Mission School art movement
- Jane Kim (born 1981), painter, science illustrator and the founder of Ink Dwell studio, based in San Francisco
- Anna Elizabeth Klumpke (1856–1942), portrait and genre painter born in San Francisco, life partner of French painter Rosa Bonheur (1822–1899)
- Arthur F. Mathews (1860–1945), painter, major influence in the Arts and Crafts movement
- Lucia Kleinhans Mathews (1870–1955), painter, major influence in the Arts and Crafts movement
- Barry McGee (born 1966), painter, part of the Mission School art movement
- Nathan Oliveira (1928–2010), painter, lived in San Francisco for many years, part of the Bay Area Figurative Movement
- Frederick E. Olmsted (1911–1990), painter, born and raised in San Francisco, former student of Ralph Stackpole; has a mural is at CCSF
- Jules Eugene Pages (1867–1946), painter
- Deborah Remington (1930–2010), abstract painter
- Lala Eve Rivol (1913–1996), worked with the Works Project Administration to illustrate rock art sites in the western United States
- Charles Dorman Robinson (1847–1933), painter
- Clare Rojas (born 1976), artist, painter, part of the Mission School art movement
- Peter Saul (born 1934), painter associated with pop art, surrealism, and expressionism
- David Simpson (born 1928), abstract painter and co-founder of Six Gallery
- Nell Sinton (1910–1997), abstract painter
- Ralph Stackpole (1885–1973), sculptor, social realist painter and muralist, active in San Francisco in 1920 and 1930s, contributed to the Coit Tower mural project
- Wayne Thiebaud (1920–2021), pop artist
- Leo Valledor (1936–1989), Filipino-American painter who pioneered the hard-edge painting style; born and raised in the Fillmore district
- Ted Vasin (born 1966), painter and sound artist
- Martin Wong (1946–1999), painter from New York's East Village art scene of the 1980s, grew up in San Francisco's Chinatown
- Bernard Zakheim (1898–1985), muralist

== Photographers ==
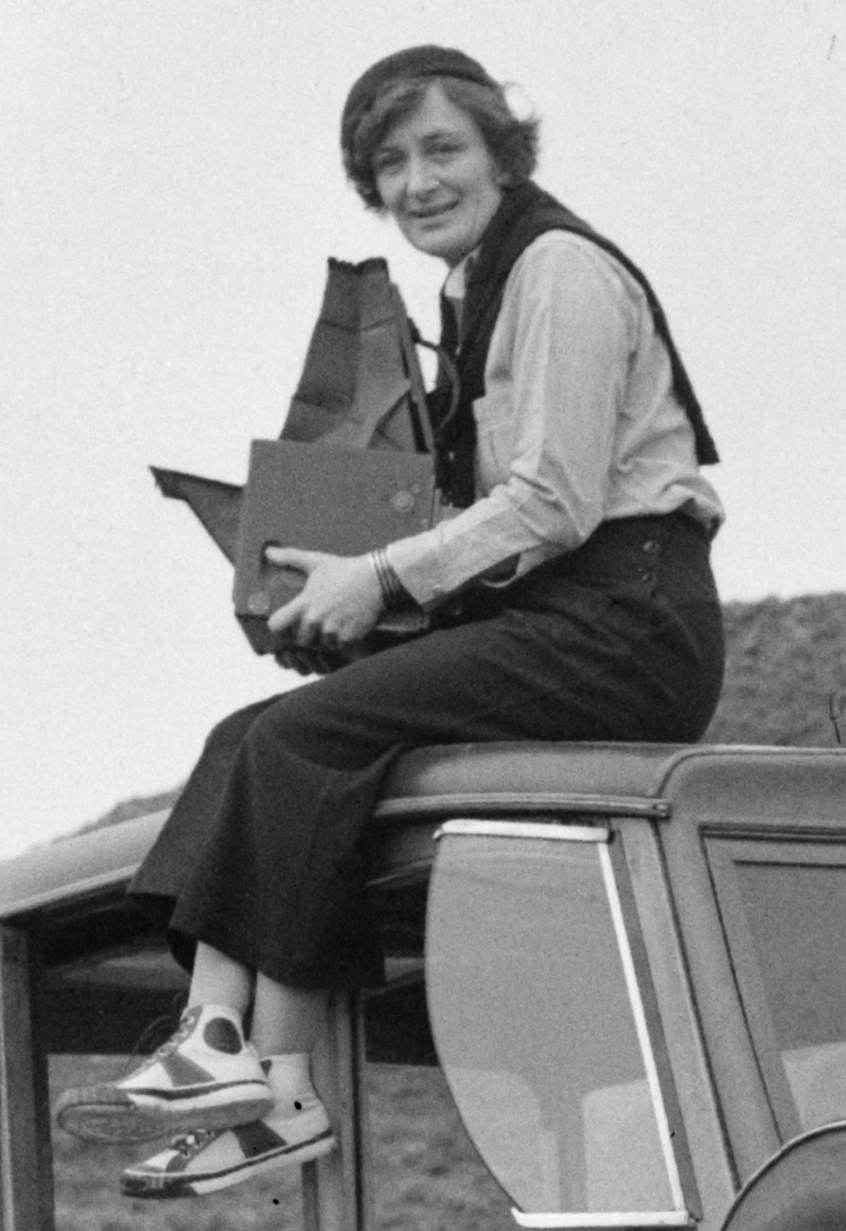
Dorothea Lange, documentary photographer and photojournalist

- Ansel Adams (1902–1984), photographer and environmentalist, born and raised in San Francisco
- Jerry Burchard (1931–2011), photographer, educator
- Victor Burgin (born 1941), photographer
- Benjamen Chinn (1921–2009), photographer active in Chinatown
- John Gutmann (1905–1998), German-born American photographer and painter
- Treu Ergeben Hecht (1875–1937), Tahiti-born American photographer
- Michael Jang (born 1951), photographer, photojournalist
- Dorothea Lange (1895–1965), photographer
- Fred Lyon (1924–2022), photographer
- Chloe Sherman (born 1969), photographer, known for her queer portraits in the Mission District in the 1990s
- Michelle Vignes (c. 1926–2012), French-born American photographer and photojournalist

== Printmakers ==
- Grafton Tyler Brown (1841–1918), lithographer; first African-American artist to create works depicting the Pacific West
- Kathan Brown (born 1935), intaglio, founder of Crown Point Press
- Ernest de Soto (1923–2014), lithographer, founder of de Soto Workshop
- George Michael Gaethke (1898–1982), WPA printmaker and painter
- Rupert García (born 1941), silkscreen, one of the co-founders of Galería de la Raza, and part of the San Francisco Bay Area Chicano Art Movement
- Frank LaPena (1937–2019), Nomtipom-Wintu American Indian artist working in many mediums including printmaking, professor, curator, ceremonial dancer; born and raised in San Francisco
- Ralph Maradiaga (1934–1985), silkscreen, one of the co-founders of Galería de la Raza, and part of the San Francisco Bay Area Chicano Art Movement
- Brian Shure (born 1952), printmaker, painter, author, and educator
- Jack Stauffacher (1920–2017), letterpress, typographer
- Beth Van Hoesen (1926–2010), printmaker, painter, and drawer; known for her animal artwork and Castro District portraits

== Sculptors ==
- Spero Anargyros (1915–2004), sculptor
- Ruth Asawa (1926–2013), sculptor, lived and died in San Francisco
- Jerry Ross Barrish (born 1939), found object assemblage sculptor and filmmaker
- Beniamino Benvenuto Bufano (1890–1970), sculptor, lived and died in San Francisco
- Alexander Calder (1898–1976), sculptor
- Vincent Fecteau (born 1969), sculptor
- Sargent Johnson (1888–1967), sculptor, one of the first African-American artists working in California to achieve a national reputation
- Freda Koblick (1920–2011), acrylic artist and sculptor
- Ron Nagle (born 1939), sculptor, musician and songwriter
- Manuel Neri (1930–2021), sculptor, part of the Bay Area Figurative Movement
- Gottardo Piazzoni (1872–1945), painter, muralist, sculptor
- Raymond Puccinelli (1904–1986), sculptor and educator; born and raised in San Francisco, lived in Italy in later life
- Richard Serra (1938–2024), artist, born in San Francisco and grew up in the Outer Sunset district
- Jacques Terzian (1921–2016), sculptor of industrial found objects, founder of "The Point" art colony at Hunters Point
- Adrien Voisin (1890–1979), bronze sculptor and architectural sculptor; restored the Albion Castle from 1930s to 1950s
- Beatrice Wood (1893–1998), ceramicist

== See also ==
- List of people from San Francisco
- Lists of artists by nationality
- List of people from Berkeley, California
- List of people from Oakland, California
- List of people from Palo Alto
- List of people from San Jose, California
- List of people from Santa Cruz, California
