= Helen Tanner Brodt =

American painter (1838–1908)

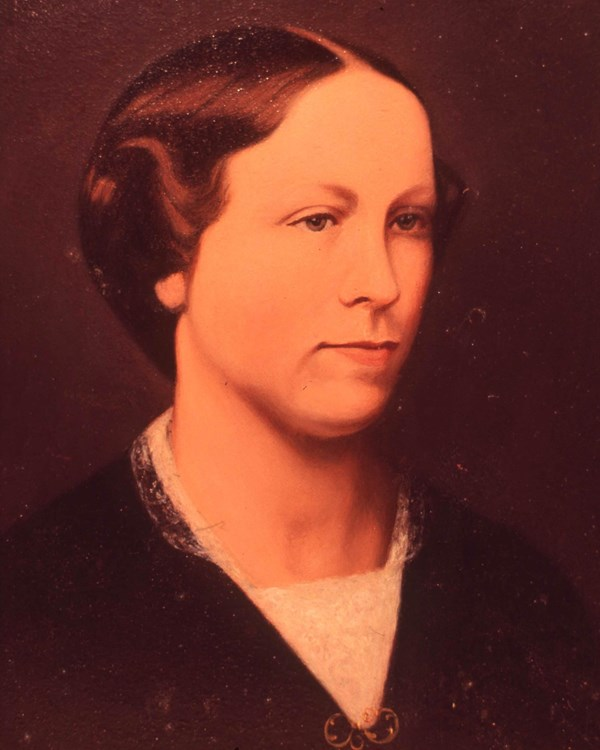
- self-portrait
- Born: April 21, 1838; Elmira
- Died: March 10, 1908 (aged 69); Berkeley
- Occupation: Painter
- Spouse(s): Aurelius Webster ("A.W.") Brodt

Helen Alice Tanner Brodt (April 21, 1838 – March 10, 1908) was an American landscape and portrait painter.

Helen Tanner was born on April 21, 1838 in Elmira, New York. She studied art at the National Academy of Design. She married Aurelius W. Brodt, a school teacher (and later principal), and they settled in Red Bluff, California in 1863. In August 1864, she and her husband accompanied Pierson B. Reading to the summit of Lassen Peak, making her the first white woman to known to have climbed that mountain. Reading named nearby Lake Helen after her.

The Brodts lived in various places in northern California. Brodt taught art in the Oakland, California public schools, where her students included Arthur Frank Mathews, brother of Walter J. Mathews. She also opened her own studio.

Most of Brodt's work depicts the landscapes and historic structures of 19th century California. She also painted portraits. Her subjects include abolitionist John Brown (from a photograph) and actress Lily Langtry. In addition to her canvases, she also practiced china painting. Much of her work was lost in the 1906 San Francisco earthquake, but a number of her paintings exist in the collections of a number of California institutions.

Helen Tanner Brodt died on 10 March 1908 in Berkeley, California.
