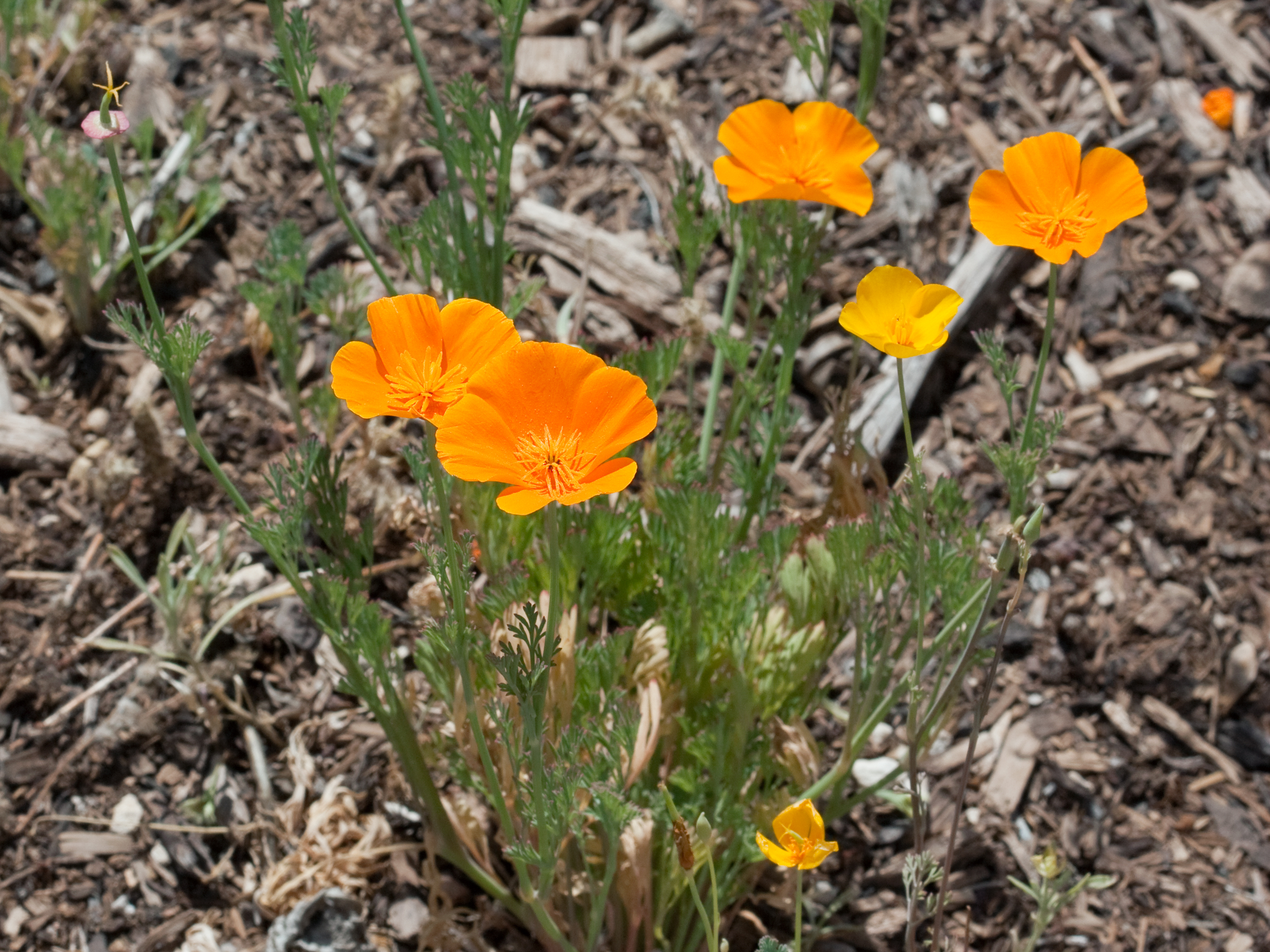

Conservation status
- Apparently Secure (NatureServe)

Scientific classification
- Kingdom: Plantae
- Clade: Tracheophytes
- Clade: Angiosperms
- Clade: Eudicots
- Order: Ranunculales
- Family: Papaveraceae
- Genus: Eschscholzia
- Species: E. californica

Binomial name
- Eschscholzia californica Cham.

= Eschscholzia californica =

California poppy

Species of flowering plant and state flower of California

Eschscholzia californica, the California poppy, golden poppy, Mexican poppy, California sunlight or cup of gold, is a species of flowering plant in the family Papaveraceae, native to the United States and Mexico. It is cultivated as an ornamental plant flowering in summer (spring in southern Australia), with showy flowers in brilliant shades of red, orange and yellow (occasionally pink and white). It is also used as food or a garnish. It had various uses in indigenous herbalism. It became the official state flower of California in 1903.

== Description ==
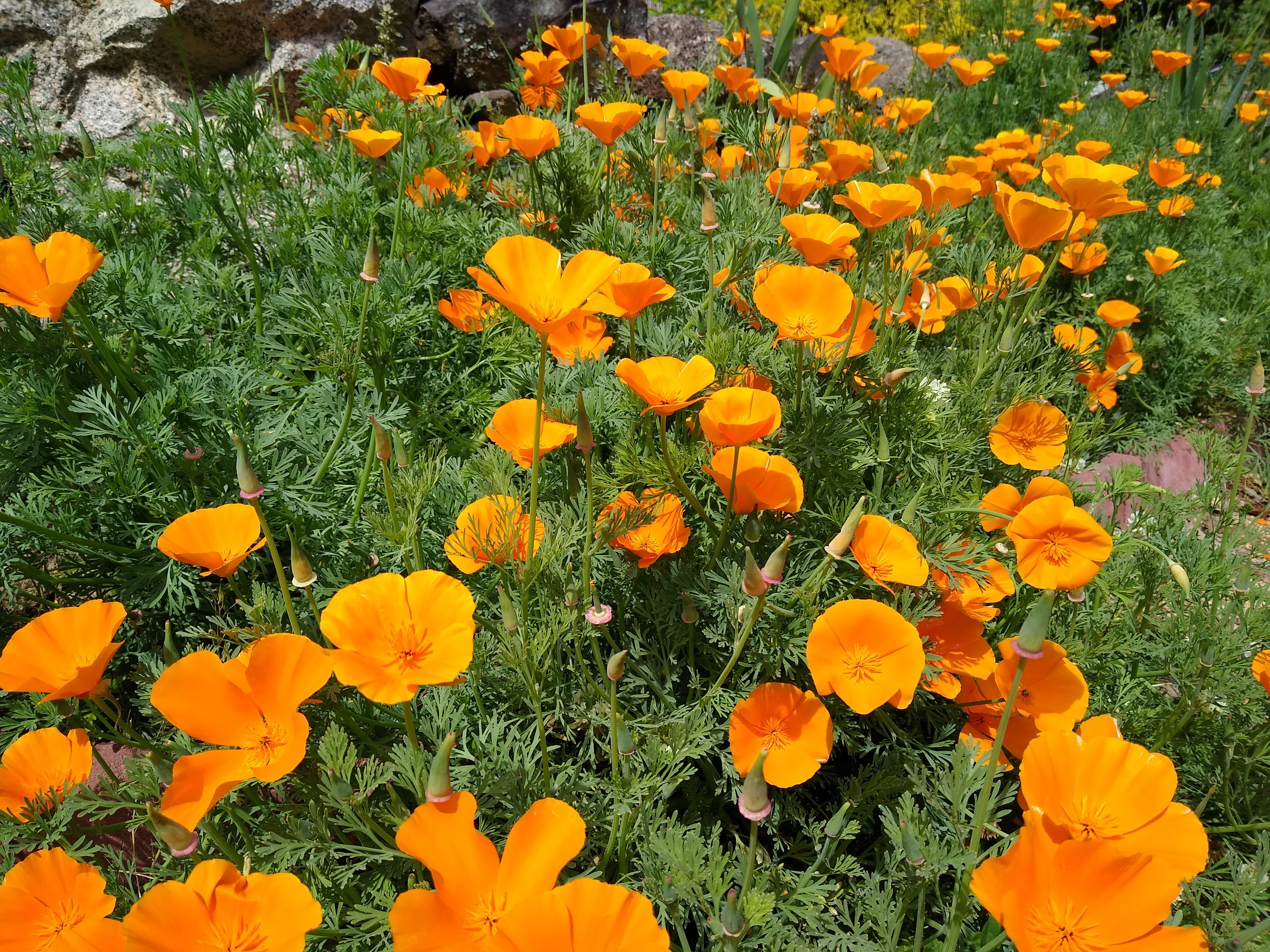
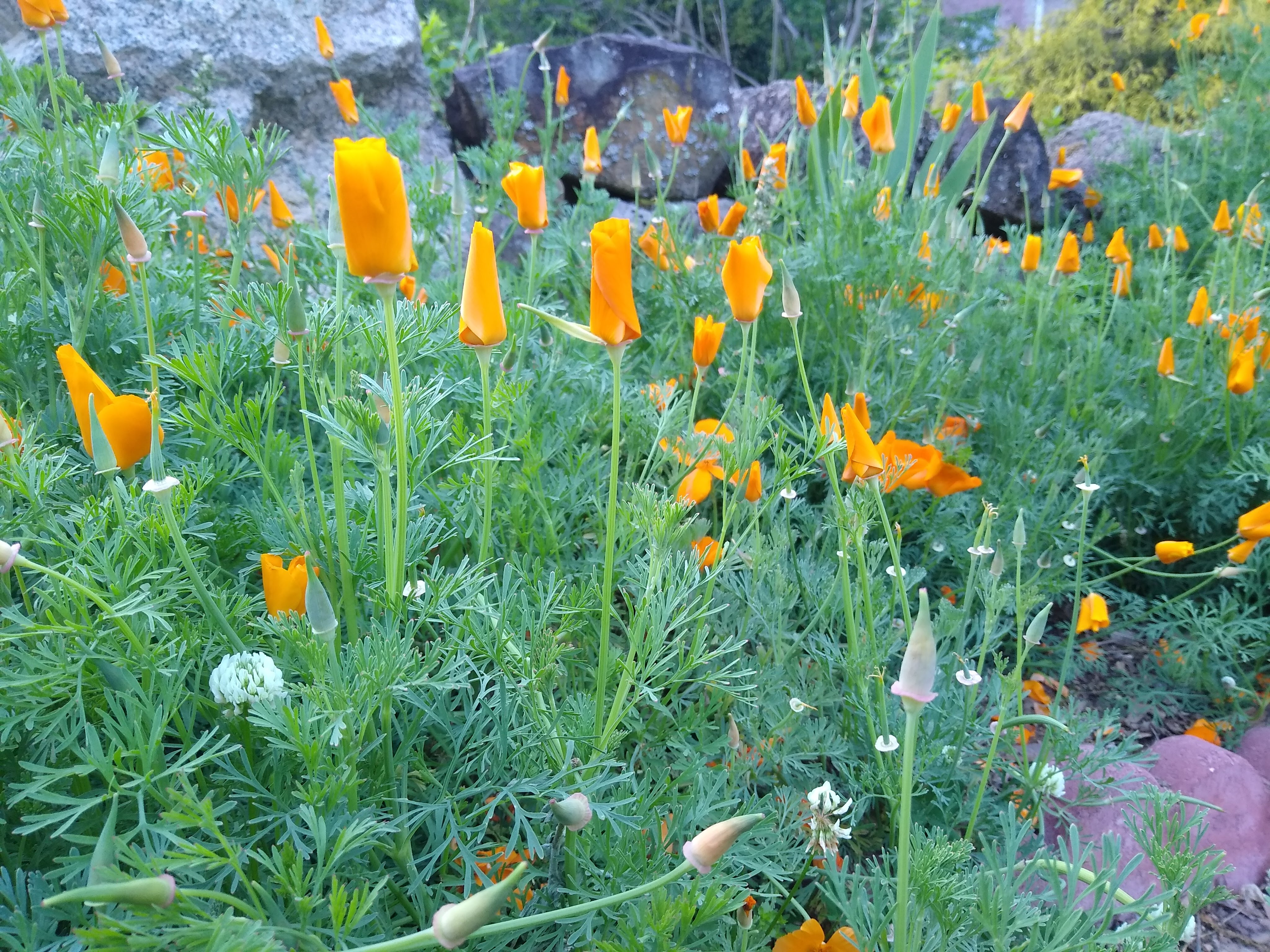
The same patch of California poppies, with petals open on a sunny day (above) and closed on a chilly evening (below).

California poppy is a perennial or annual plant growing to 5–12 in (13–30 cm) tall with alternately branching glaucous blue-green foliage. The leaves are alternately divided into round, lobed segments. The flowers are solitary on long stems, silky-textured, with four petals, each petal 2 to 6 cm (0.79 to 2.36 in) long and broad; flower color ranges through yellow, orange and red. Flowering occurs from February to September in the northern hemisphere. The petals close at night (or in cold, windy weather) and open again the following morning, although they may remain closed in cloudy weather. The fruit is a slender, dehiscent capsule 3 to 9 cm (1.2 to 3.5 in) long, which splits in two, sometimes explosively with an audible snap, to release numerous small 1.5–1.8 mm (0.059–0.071 in) wide black or dark brown seeds. The plant will reseed under ideal conditions, or when winters are cold. Anecdotally, it can be an aggressive reseeder in the home garden context, eventually becoming a groundcover. It survives mild winters in its native range, dying completely in colder climates.

=== Habitat ===
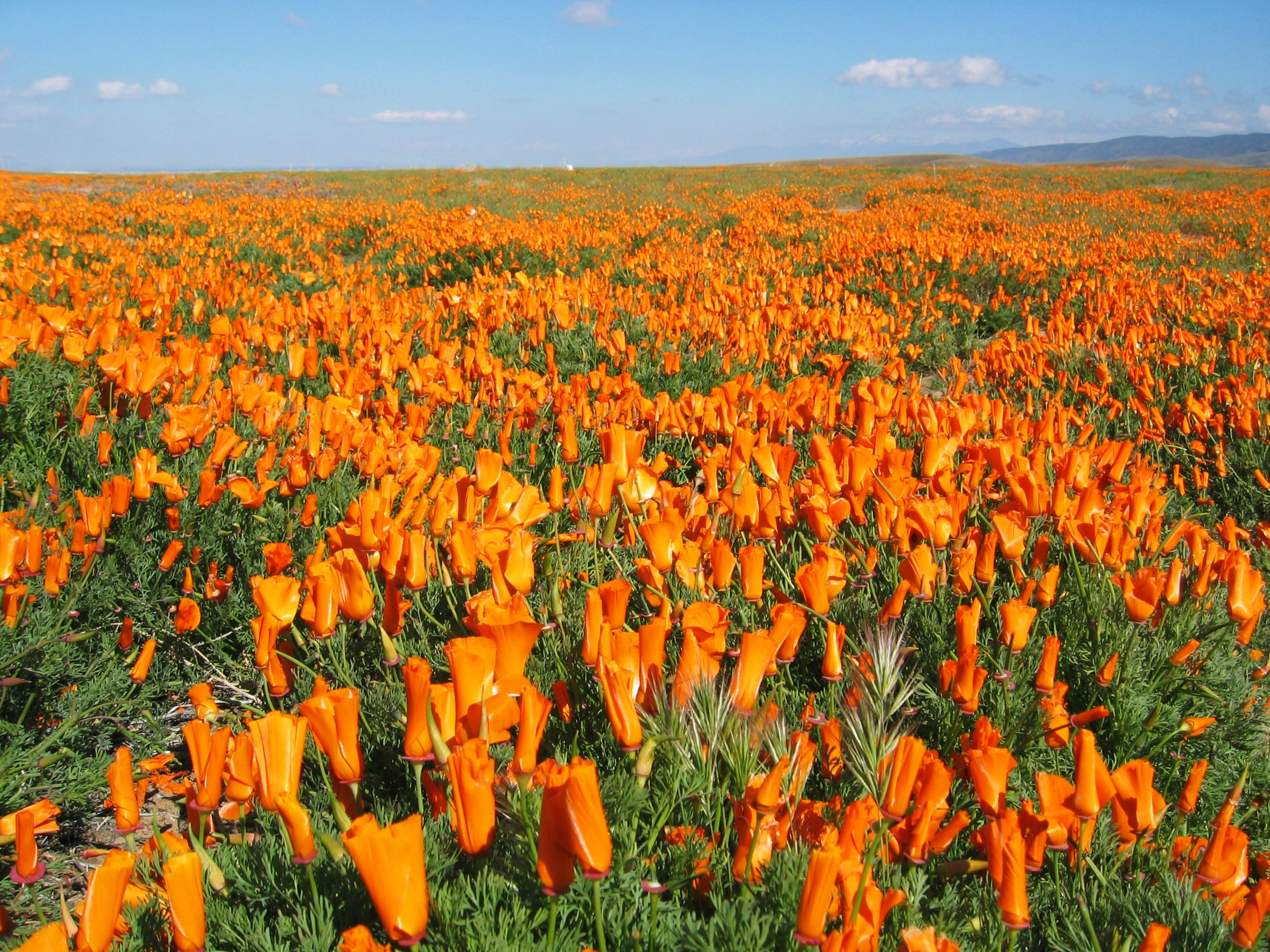
Antelope Valley California Poppy Reserve

Its native habitat includes California and extends to Oregon, Washington, Nevada, Arizona, New Mexico, Sonora and northwest Baja California. The Antelope Valley California Poppy Reserve is located in northern Los Angeles County. At the peak of the blooming season, orange flowers seem to cover all 1,745 acres (706 ha) of the reserve. Other prominent locations of California poppy meadows include Bear Valley (Colusa County) and Point Buchon (San Luis Obispo County).

=== Taxonomy ===
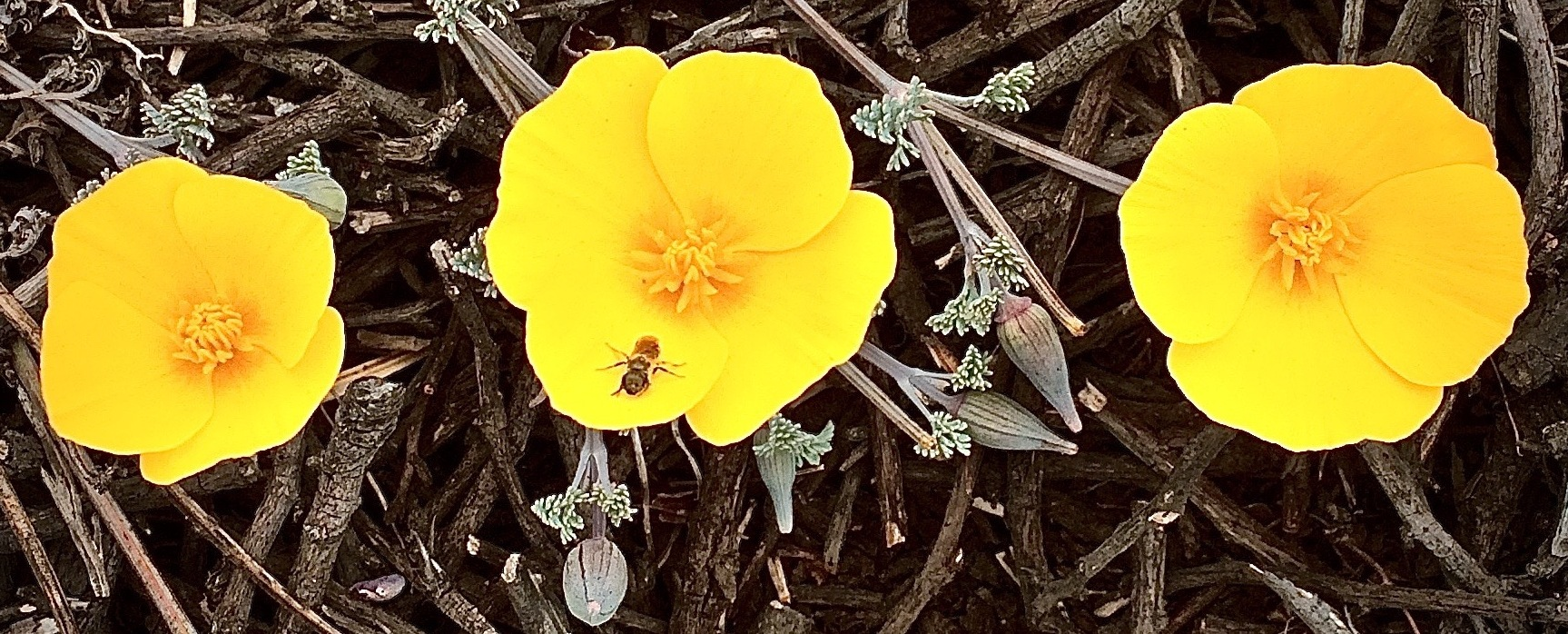
E. californica subsp. californica var. maritima

Eschscholzia californica was the first named species of the genus Eschscholzia, named by the German botanist Adelbert von Chamisso after the Baltic German botanist Johann Friedrich von Eschscholtz, his friend and colleague on Otto von Kotzebue's scientific expedition to California and the greater Pacific circa 1810 aboard the Russian ship Rurik.

California poppy is highly variable, with over 90 synonyms. Some botanists accept two subspecies—one with four varieties (e.g., Leger & Rice 2003)—though others do not recognize them as distinct (e.g., Jepson 1993):

- E. californica subsp. californica, native to California, Baja California, and Oregon, widely planted as an ornamental, and an invasive elsewhere (see below).
  - E. californica subsp. californica var. californica, which is found along the coast from the San Francisco Peninsula north. They are perennial and somewhat prostrate, with yellow flowers.
  - E. californica subsp. californica var. maritima (E. L. Greene) Jeps., which is found along the coast from Monterey south to San Miguel Island. They are perennial, long-lived, glaucous, short in stature, and have extremely prostrate growth and yellow flowers.
  - E. californica subsp. californica var. crocea (Benth.) Jeps., which grows in non-arid inland regions. They are perennial, taller, and have orange flowers.
  - E. California subsp. californica var. peninsularis (E. L. Greene) Munz, which is an annual or facultative annual growing in arid inland environments.
- E. californica subsp. mexicana (E. L. Greene) and Curtis Clark, the Mexican gold poppy, which is found in the Chihuahuan and Sonoran Deserts. Some authorities refer to it as E. Mexicana. These variations in features among Eschscholzia species have led to inconsistencies in species descriptions and identifications. This variation, both within and between species, triggered a surge in Eschscholzia species descriptions, reaching 112 taxa in the early part of the last century. Currently, there are 189 taxonomic descriptions at the species level and below, with 159 type specimens scattered across global herbaria. The shift in recognizing poppy species, known as the "Greene Revolution", initiated a significant reduction in recognized species. Willis Lynn Jepson played a pivotal role by considering the majority of described taxa as mere environmental variations. In his book A Flora of California, published in 1922, he consolidated many of the taxa into Eschscholtzia californica and reduced the total number of taxa within the greater Eschscholtzia genus from around 120 to 12.

Botanical research has held significant implications towards the classification of Eschscholzia. Despite some unresolved aspects in the phylogenies, it is evident that taxonomic are necessary within the genus, particularly in three areas: supporting two subspecies of E. californica, endorsing two subspecies of E. lemmonii, and recognizing two potential new taxa. Currently, 8 taxa are officially recognized.

It belongs to the subfamily Eschscholzioideae, sister group to the subfamily Papaveroideae (which includes Papaver somniferum, the opium poppy).

== Pollen ==
As poppies are not wind-pollinated, their pollen poses no allergy risk via inhalation.

A UK study of meadow flowers including commercial mixes and common plants such as ragwort and dandelion ranked the California poppy highly in pollen production, although it did not produce a significant amount of nectar. On a per-flower basis it ranked second, with a rate of 8.3 ± 1.1μl. The corn poppy, Papaver rhoeas, topped the list for per-flower pollen production with its rate of 13.3 ± 2.8μl. When measuring the entire capitulum the top two species were the ox-eye daisy, Leucanthemum vulgare, with 15.9 ± 2μl, and Cosmos bipinnatus, which had a rate nearly equivalent to that of the corn poppy.

== Cultivation ==
E. californica is drought-tolerant, self-seeding, and easy to cultivate. It is best grown as an annual, in full sun, and well-draining sandy or loam soil. Horticulturalists have produced numerous cultivars with a range of colors and blossom and stem forms. These typically do not breed true on reseeding. Seeds are often sold as mixtures. The following cultivars have gained the Royal Horticultural Society's Award of Garden Merit:-

- 'Apricot chiffon' (yellow flushed with pink and orange)
- 'Dali' (red)
- 'Rose chiffon' (pink and white)
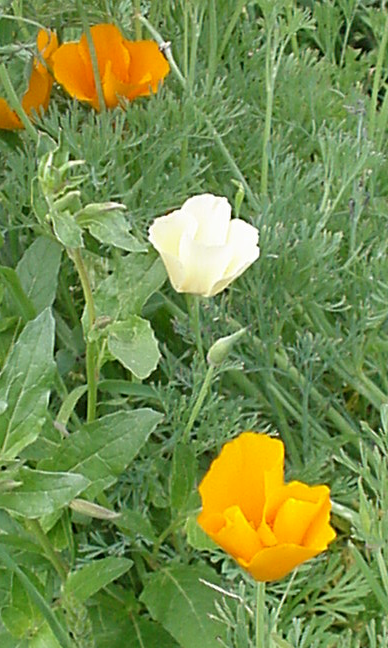
Genetic variation in blossom color

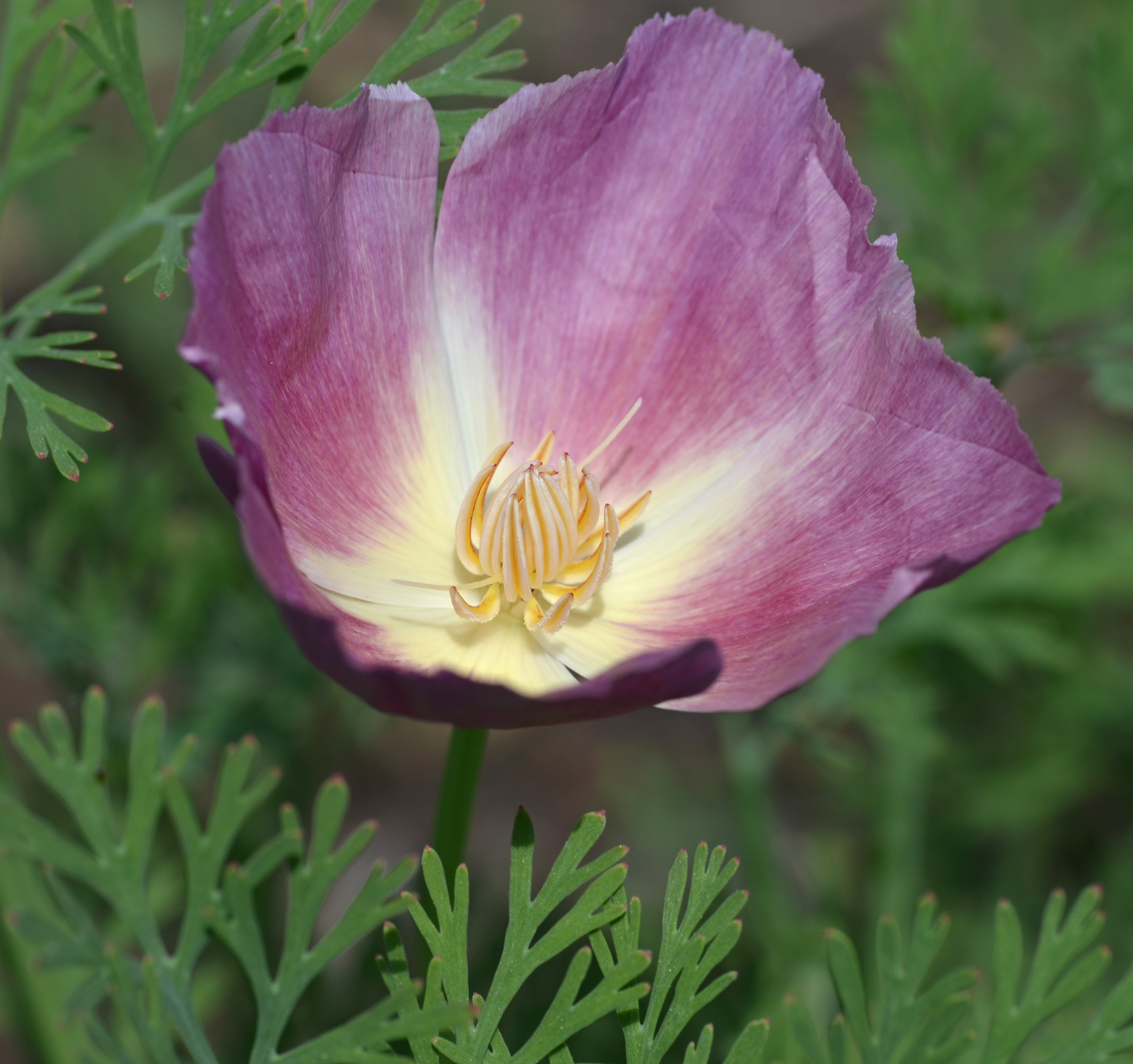
'Purple gleam' cultivar

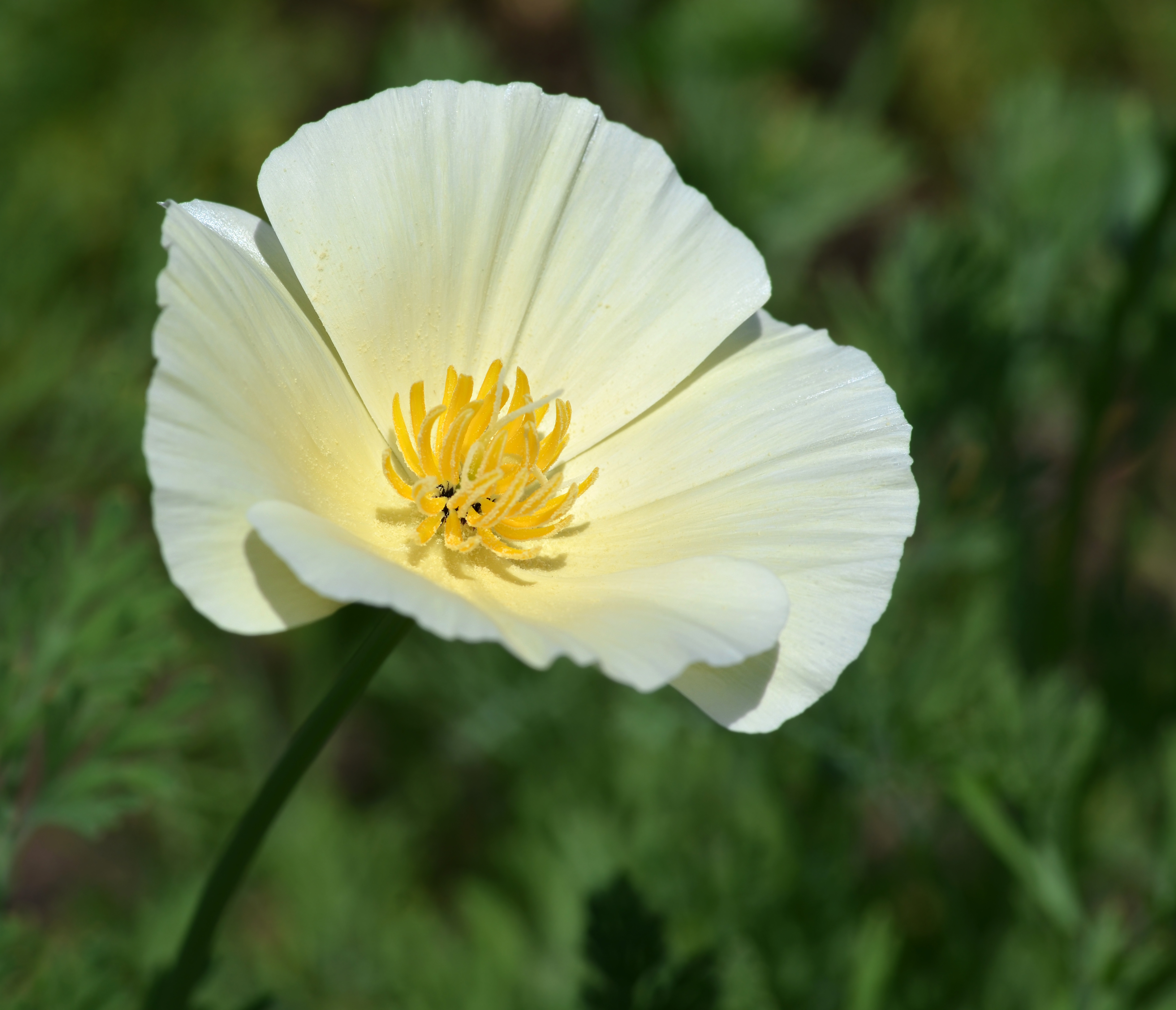
'Ivory castle' cultivar

== Uses ==
California poppy leaves are used as food or garnish, while the seeds are used in cooking. There are no clinical trials showing it can effectively treat psychiatric disorders in humans.

=== Chemical compounds ===
E. californica contains californidine (N^{+}(CH3)2), allocryptopine, eschscholtzine N-CH3 (californidine), and other similar (Papaveraceae) alkaloids, as well as berberine.

==== Preparation ====
The California poppy has been used through two methods: fresh petals to create a syrup, and dried petals added to water to make an infusion or boiled for tea.

== As an introduced species ==
California poppies are commercially sold and widely naturalized in Australia, including Tasmania, and the species has also been introduced to South Africa, Chile, New Zealand, and Argentina. In both Chile and California, there are marked differences between California poppies grown in low and high altitudes. Coastal or low-altitude specimens produce fewer flowers and seeds, experience longer flowering times, and have shorter stems.

== Historical and cultural significance ==
=== Indigenous people ===
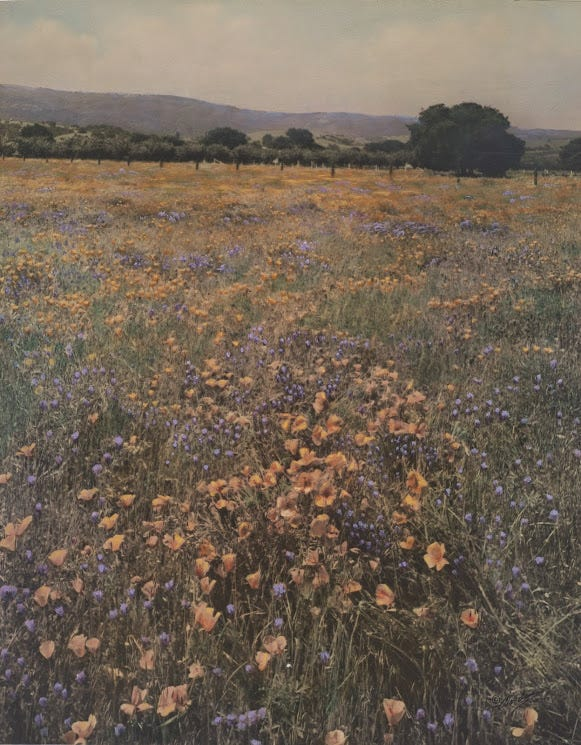
Willard Worden, Poppies and Lupine, gelatin silver print, c. 1915.

The California poppy has been historically used as traditional medicine and cosmetics by some indigenous people in California, particularly those native to the regions where the plant is found. In particular, Tongva Gabrielino, Cahuilla, Costanoan, Luiseno, and Pomo have cultural and historical connections with the poppy. These connections involve traditional uses of the plant, cultural significance, and even folklore.

The Tongva peoples of the San Gabriel Valley region recognized the California poppy by the term Mekachaa. Such indigenous communities interpret the Mekechaa as a plant relative, and actively resisted attempts to appropriate its existence through artistic community projects. In Waa'aka', the final plant created by the Tongva's god of creation, Wiyot, was the Island poppy, described as "golden as the sun, bringing beauty to the world."

=== 18th and 19th centuries ===
In the late 1700s, Spanish settlers affectionately called the poppy "copa de oro" (gold cup). By 1816, Russian explorers officially named the flower Eschscholzia californica. Since California's statehood in 1850, local residents have embraced it as the California poppy or golden poppy.

Several years later, Chamisso introduced the wildflower through a detailed description and life-sized color painting in Horae Physicae Berolinenses (1820). This marked the entry of the poppy into European taxonomic systems as Eschscholzia californica. The living flower made its European debut in 1826, courtesy of Scottish botanist David Douglas, who collected various plant seeds, including Eschscholzia californica, for the Royal Horticultural Society of England. While evidence indicates that the golden poppy started appearing in British gardens over the subsequent fifty years, it had not yet become strongly associated with ideas of California identity and statehood. An 1883 Scottish report, recounting a visit to California and an encounter with the golden wildflowers, reflects the early attitudes forming around the poppy.

In the 19th century, the California poppy held a dual identity, both as a botanical native and as a symbolic representation of California. It was crafted to embody the essence of a "true" Californian, celebrated and used predominantly by the white Californian community. The Native Daughters and Sons of the Golden West played a pivotal role in establishing the California poppy as a cultural icon.

By the 1890s, Eschscholzia californica had transformed from merely the California or golden poppy to the designated state poppy– a shift from a botanical specimen with regional ties to a symbol of the state.

=== State flower of California ===
A Welcome to California road sign, featuring golden poppies

A California Scenic Route marker showing the state flower

During the 1890s Sarah Plummer Lemmon advocated for the adoption of the golden poppy as the state flower of California, eventually writing the bill passed by the California Legislature and signed by Governor George Pardee in 1903. In this era, the state aimed to construct an external identity grounded in the natural wealth of the region, enticing newcomers and businesses with promises of celebration and prosperity. Publicly, products synonymous with the color gold, such as oranges, wheat, actual gold, and the iconic golden poppy, were strategically employed as influential elements in the endeavor to shape and promote the state.

In the aftermath of the 1906 San Francisco earthquake and fire, the California poppy became a central design motif and symbol influencing various decorative objects. Such decorative objects featured California scenes and prominently showcased the California poppy symbolizing the imagined, pastoral and prosperous California that artists sought to create.

A particular example is a wooden box painted by Lucia Kleinhans Mathews in 1929. This box serves as a visual representation of the symbiotic relationship between the poppy and California, reinforcing the state's identity through design. As the official state flower of California, Eschscholzia californica is pictured on welcome signs along highways entering California and on official Scenic Route signs.

In March 2019, a "super bloom" of California poppies in the city of Lake Elsinore, California, drew nationwide attention. So-called super blooms occur after a period of heavy rainfall and often draw large crowds. The most popular sightseeing spot, Walker Canyon, was overwhelmed by more than 100,000 visitors in the span of a few days, causing city officials to temporarily shut down surrounding roads to motor vehicles.

== Gallery ==
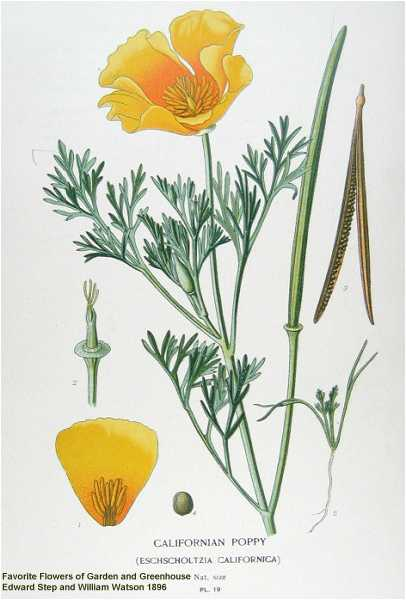
Botanical illustration

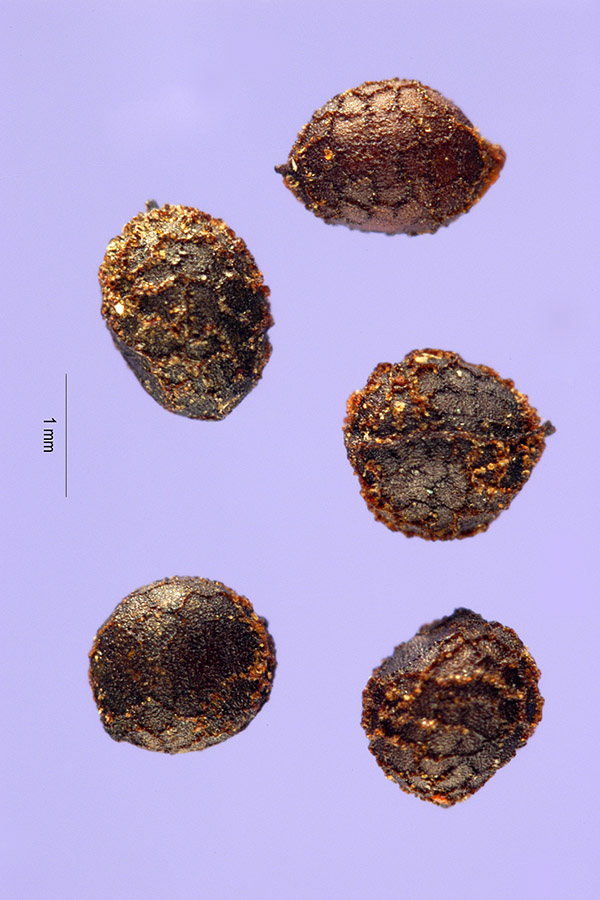
Seeds

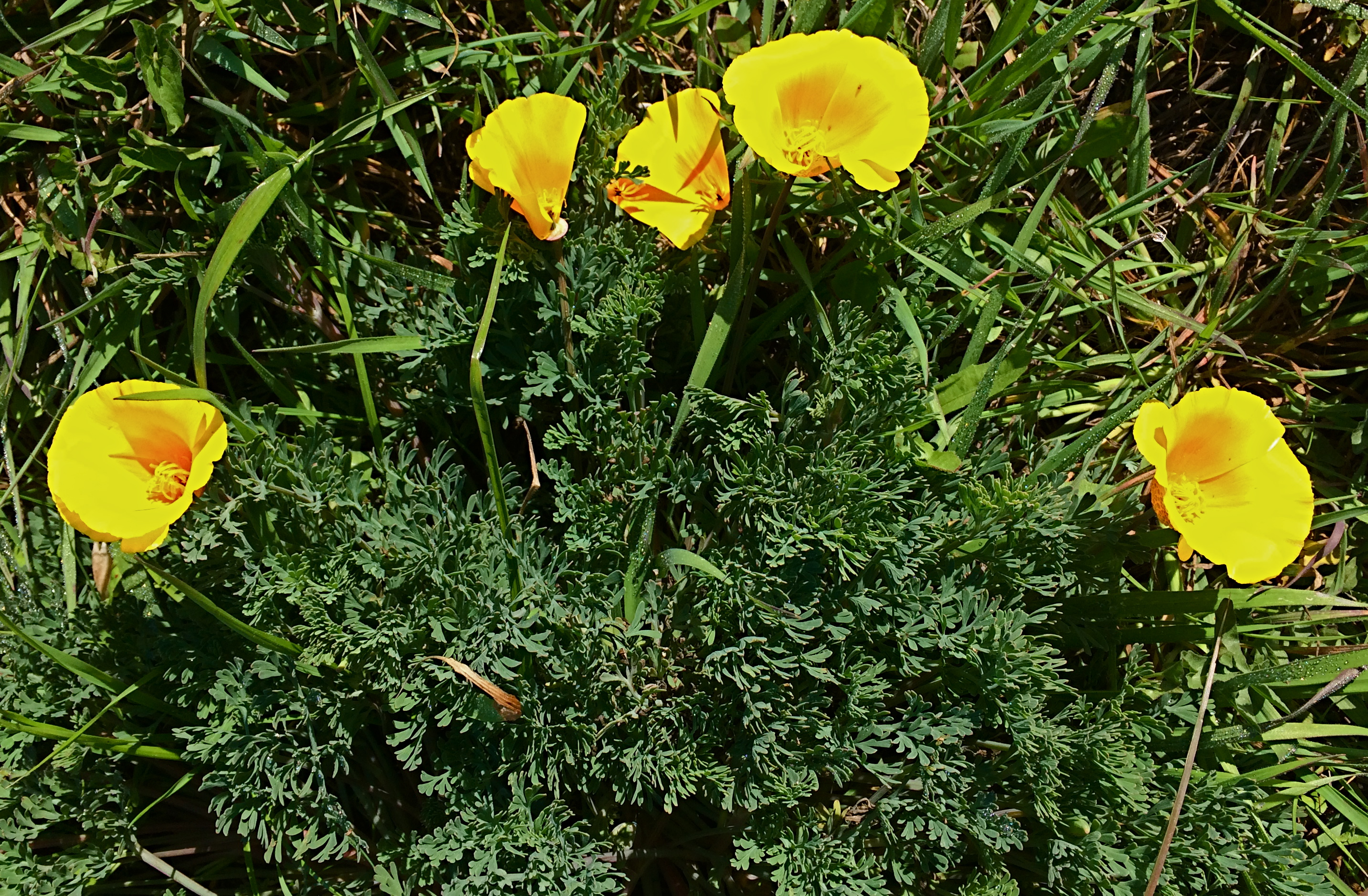
Maritime poppies, E. californica subsp. californica var. maritima (E.L. Greene) Jeps

== See also ==
- Californidine, a chemical compound found in Eschscholzia californica
- Papaver somniferum, the opium poppy (closely related to Eschscholzia californica)

== Sources ==
- "Eschscholzia californica". Jepson Flora Project. University of California. 1993.
- Leger, E. A.; Rice, K. J. (2003). "Invasive California poppies (Eschscholzia californica Cham.) grow larger than native individuals under reduced competition". Ecology Letters. 6 (3): 257–264. Bibcode:2003EcolL...6..257L. doi:10.1046/j.1461-0248.2003.00423.x. S2CID 86091323.
