= First Unitarian Church of Oakland =

Historic church in California, United States

- First Unitarian Church of Oakland
- Location: Oakland, California
- Country: United States
- Denomination: Unitarian Universalist
- Website: uuoakland.org
- First Unitarian Church
- U.S. National Register of Historic Places
- California Historical Landmark No. 896
- Oakland Designated Landmark
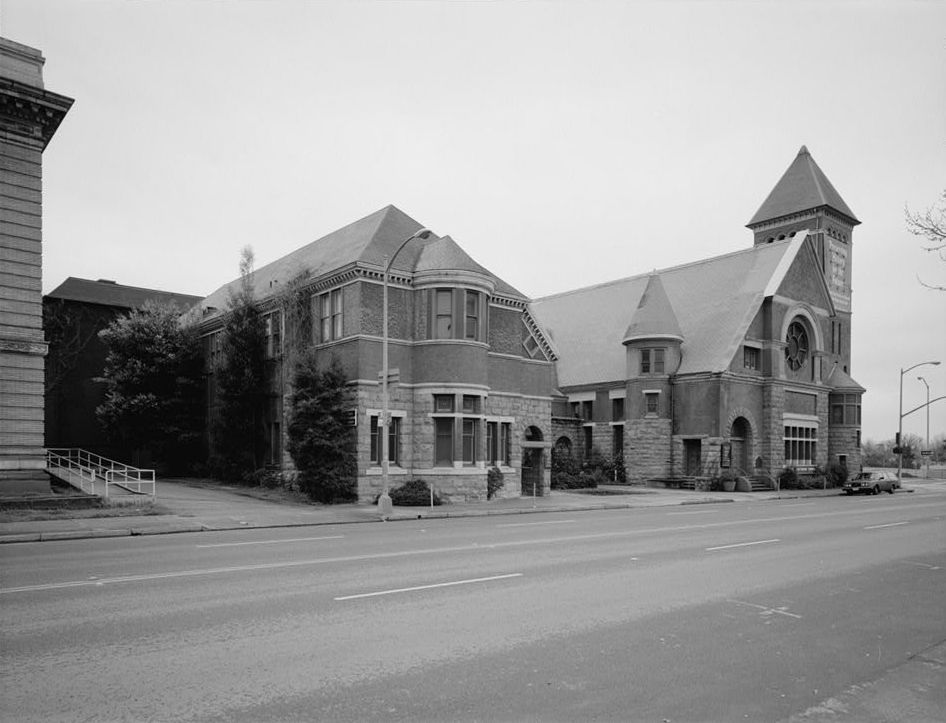
- View of the church facade, facing southwest
- Location: 685 14th Street, Oakland, California, U.S.
- Coordinates: 37°48′23″N 122°16′36″W
- Built: 1891
- NRHP reference No.: 77000284
- CHISL No.: 896
- ODL No.: 13

Significant dates
- Added to NRHP: June 16, 1977
- Designated CHISL: June 16, 1976
- Designated ODL: August 5, 1975

The First Unitarian Church of Oakland is located in western Downtown Oakland, California. It is a member of the Unitarian Universalist Association.

== History ==
The building site was purchased in November 1888 from Jane K. Sather, a patron of the University of California. Construction began in 1890 and was completed in September 1891, although it began to be used for various activities while still unfinished.

The church building was designed in 1889 by Walter J. Mathews. This solid masonry Romanesque Revival style church departed radically from California's then predominant wood framed Carpenter Gothic style churches. It is noted for its famous stained glass windows produced by Goodhue of Boston, and for its arching redwood spans that were the widest at the time west of the Rocky Mountains.

The 1906 San Francisco earthquake damaged the building, but did not destroy it.

=== Landmark ===
The church is listed as California Historical Landmark #896, and is also listed on the National Register of Historic Places (NPS-77000284). The church remains a significant cultural and architectural landmark in Oakland.
