= Californidine =

Names
- Preferred IUPAC name (5R,12S)-15,15-Dimethyl-5,6,12,13-tetrahydro-2H,9H-[5,12-azanocycloocta[1,2-f:5,6-f′]bis([1,3]benzodioxol)]-15-ium
- Other names N-Methylcalifornine; N-Methylcrychine; N-Methylescholtzine; Eschscholtzine N-methosalt

Identifiers
| CAS Number | 18830-99-4 |
| 3D model (JSmol) | Interactive image |
| ChemSpider | 28941458 |
| PubChem CID | 177017 |
| CompTox Dashboard (EPA) | DTXSID10904141 |
- InChI: InChI=1S/C20H20NO4/c1-21(2)15-3-11-5-17-19(24-9-22-17)7-13(11)16(21)4-12-6-18-20(8-14(12)15)25-10-23-18/h5-8,15-16H,3-4,9-10H2,1-2H3/q+1/t15-,16-/m0/s1 Key: HFYKETHYKFKFQE-HOTGVXAUSA-N
- SMILES: C[N+]1([C@H]2Cc3cc4c(cc3[C@@H]1Cc5c2cc6c(c5)OCO6)OCO4)C

Properties
| Chemical formula | C_{20}H_{20}NO_{4}^{+1} |
| Molar mass | 338.382 g·mol^{−1} |
- Except where otherwise noted, data are given for materials in their standard state (at 25 °C [77 °F], 100 kPa). Infobox references

Californidine is an alkaloid with the molecular formula C_{20}H_{20}NO_{4}^{+}. It has been isolated from extracts of the California poppy (Eschscholzia californica), from which it gets its name, and from other plants of the genus Eschscholzia.

== Pharmaceutical use ==
Because of the sedative, anxiolytic, and analgesic effects, the herb California Poppy (Amapola de California, Eschscholzia californica, Pavot d'Amérique, Pavot d'Or, Pavot de Californie, Poppy California, Yellow Poppy) is currently sold in pharmacies in many countries.
