= C. A. Belden House =

- U.S. National Register of Historic Places
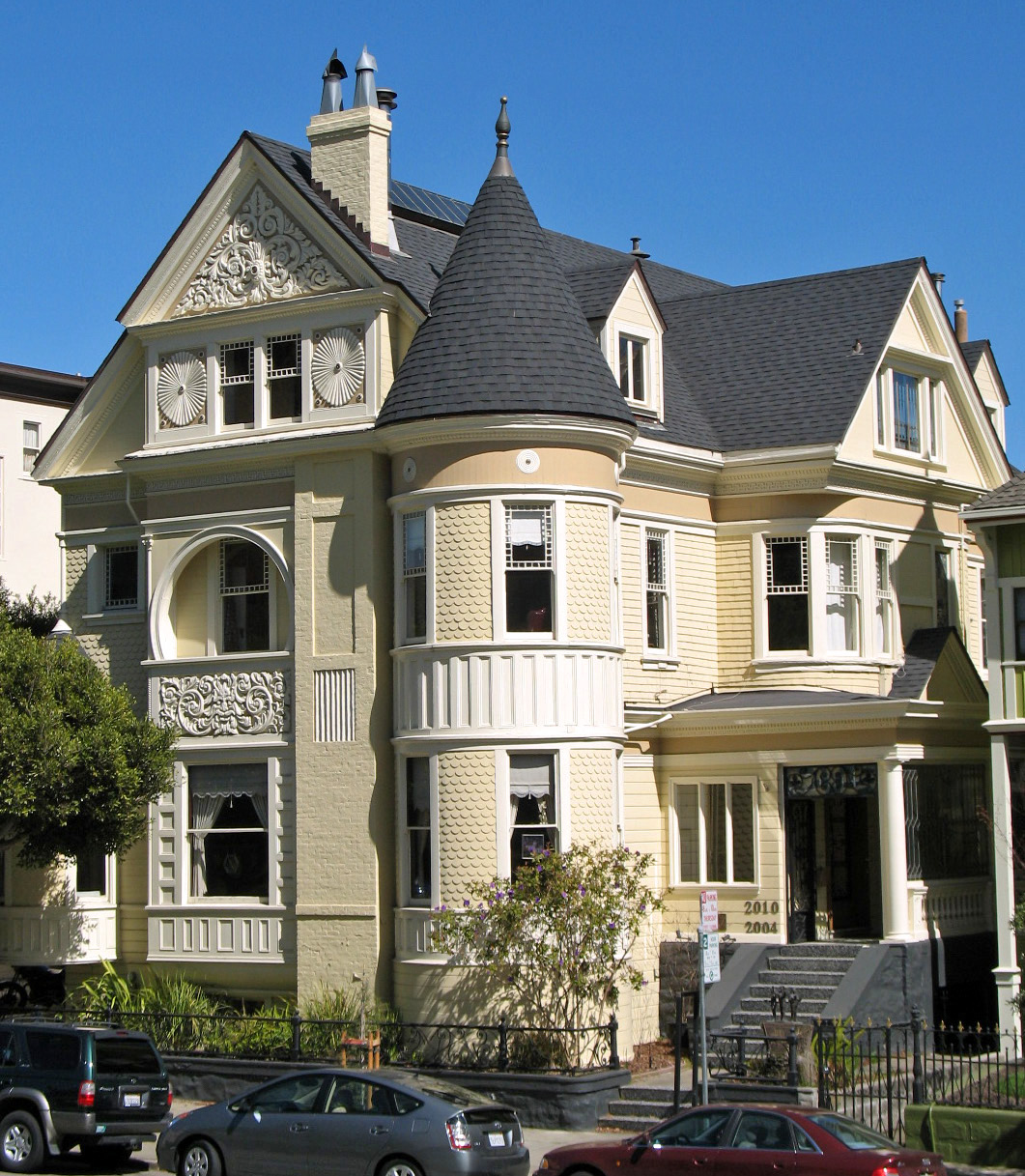

- Location within San Francisco County Location within California Location within the United States
- Location: 2004-2010 Gough St., San Francisco, California
- Coordinates: 37°47′29″N 122°25′28″W
- Area: 0.2 acres (0.081 ha)
- Built: 1889
- Architect: Walter J. Mathews
- Architectural style: Queen Anne
- NRHP reference No.: 83001229
- Added to NRHP: August 11, 1983

The C. A. Belden House is a historic building in the Pacific Heights neighborhood of San Francisco, California, United States. It was designed by Walter J. Mathews in the Queen Anne style and completed in 1889.

== Description ==
The house is on Gough Street, facing Lafayette Park. Designed by Walter J. Mathews, a prominent Bay Area architect, it is unusual in San Francisco in being purely Queen Anne in style. It is three stories tall, with a steeply pitched gable roof and two corner turrets with conical roofs; the turrets and the first floor have fish-scale shingles, while the remainder of the house is clad in horizontal siding. The main facade, facing the park, is decorated with carved and plaster areas that have been compared to "patterns appliqued on a Victorian sampler": the pediment under the gable is richly carved, two sunbursts flank a pair of windows on the third floor, and below an arched window porch on the second floor is a panel with a grinning mythological beast. The house's style has been characterized as "[a] full flowering of Queen Anne exuberance".

== History ==
It was built on the lot at number 2004 in 1889 for Charles A. Belden, treasurer of an importing company, whose family lived there until 1900. In 1907 it was purchased by John A. Buck, who had the house at 2010 Gough Street demolished. The Bucks lived there until 1933, after which time it became a home for elderly women. In 1961 the Bucks sold the building to the Hudec Trust; in 1967 it was bought by John Fell Stevenson, a son of Adlai Stevenson II, and his wife, who lived there until 1973. The Bucks added decorative ironwork, and later altered the interior somewhat for retirement home use, including partitioning the third floor, which had originally been an open servants' dormitory and children's play area; the Stevensons made further interior changes. It was added to the National Register of Historic Places on August 11, 1983, at which time its owners were restoring it.
