= Lala Eve Rivol =

American commercial artist

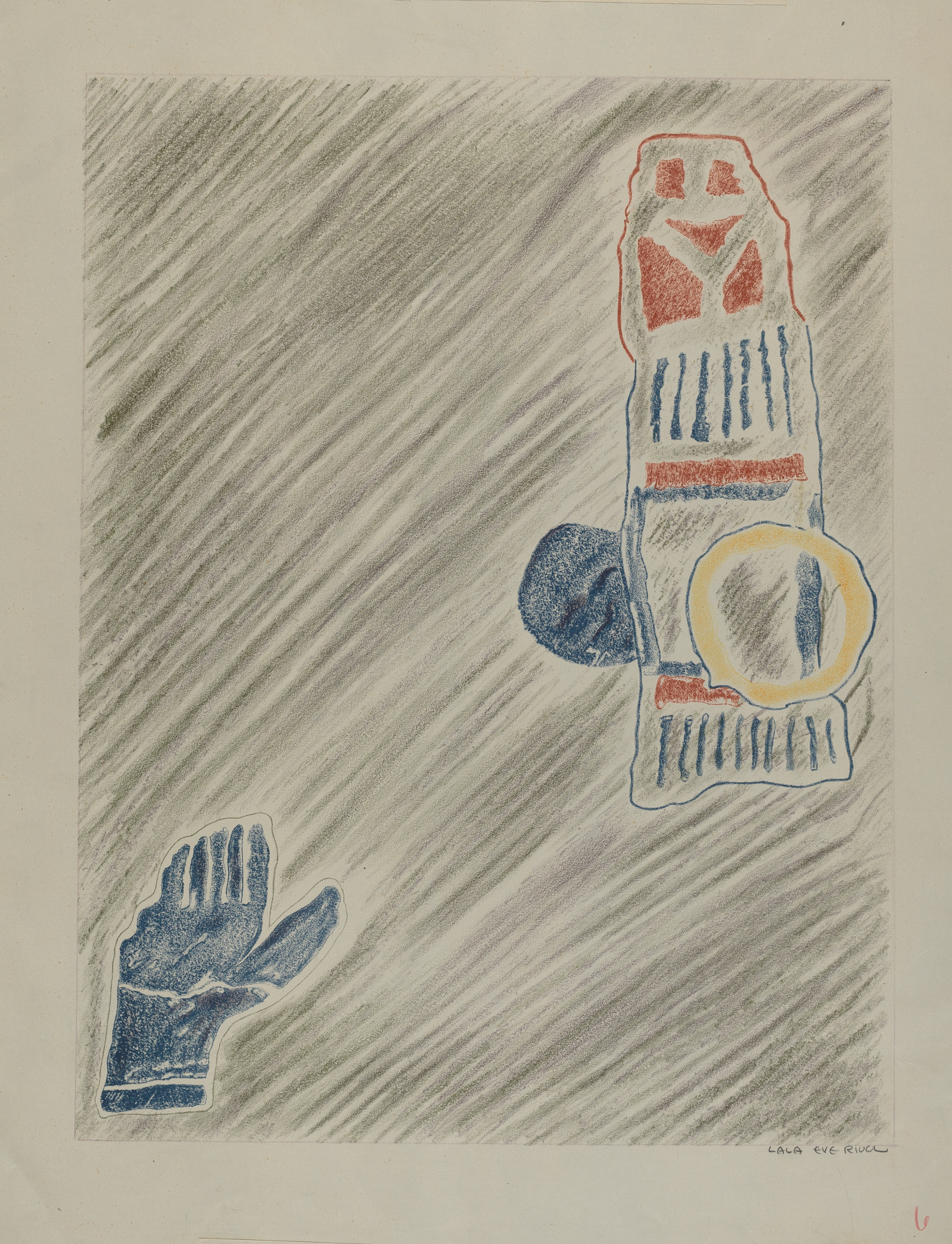
Lithograph of a petroglyph design by Lala Eve Rivol

Lala Eve Rivol (August 13, 1913 – February 14, 1996) was an American commercial artist.

Born in New York City, Rivol later moved to the West Coast; she was a resident of San Francisco in 1938. In that year she worked for the Federal Art Project's Index of American Design, documenting rock art sites throughout the western United States. Her paintings and sketches, which depict Chumash and Yokuts petroglyphs and rock paintings, as well as those from other tribes, record the appearance of many sites prior to later vandalism. Many of the sites she visited were in California, but others were in Nevada and Arizona. She died in San Diego.

Thirty lithographs by Rivol are held by the National Gallery of Art, where they form part of the collection of the Index of American Design. A further fifteen are owned by the Fine Arts Museums of San Francisco; the state of Utah owns other pieces. Her sketches are held by the University of California, Berkeley. A book about her work, The Rock Art Lithographs of Lala Eve Rivol by Paul Freeman, was published in 1997.
