= Ted Vasin =

Russian-born American artist (born 1966)

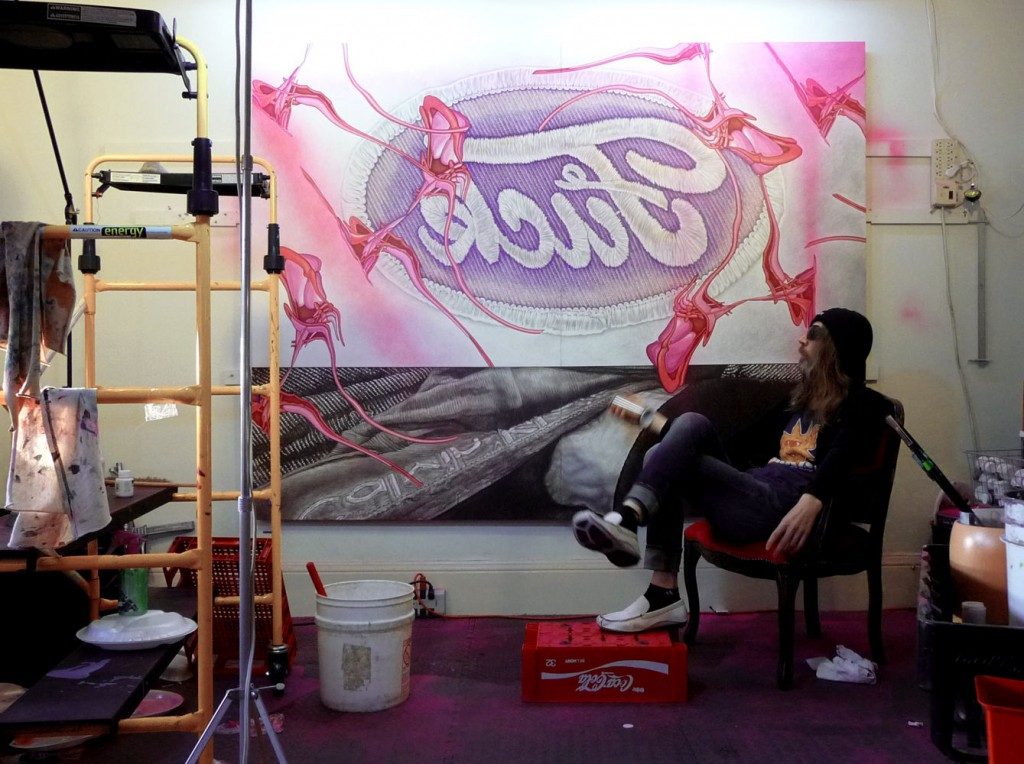
- Vasin in SF studio, 2009
- Born: April 11, 1966 (age 60); Moscow, Russia
- Known for: Painting, Experimental sound
- Movement: Psychedelic art
- Awards: Pollock-Krasner Foundation Grant
- Website: http://www.tedvasin.com

Ted Vasin (born April 11, 1966) is an American artist who works in painting and sound. His work addresses the phenomenon of the psychological spectrum and its possibilities of expansion and transcendence. He is based in San Francisco.

== Biography ==
Born April 11, 1966 in Moscow, Russia. He studied at Moscow Art College and graduated in 1986, before relocating to the United States in the 1990s.

Vasin has exhibited for nearly two decades both internationally and statewide including shows at the 101/exhibit, Limm Art Gallery, Davis Art Center, artMRKT Hamptons, Frey Norris Gallery, Sotheby’s in New York, Tel Aviv and Amsterdam, Stanford Art Spaces, and more.

He was an artist-in-residence at the Fine Arts Museums of San Francisco, exhibiting at the California Palace of the Legion of Honor and the De Young Art Center. In 2006 Vasin was a recipient of the Pollock-Krasner Foundation Grant.

His work has been reviewed by the ArtWeek, San Francisco Chronicle, ArtSlant and has been featured in Hi-Fructose Magazine, American Art Collector, New American Paintings, Wired magazine, as well as online in Juxtapoz, and Beautiful/Decay.
