= Nevdon Jamgochian =

- Born: May 3, 1971 (age 54); San Francisco
- Known for: Artist

Nevdon Jamgochian (May 3, 1971) is an American artist.

== Biography ==
Nevdon Jamgochian, (born May 3, 1971) is an American artist who primarily works with narratives that engage understandings of history. He was trained as a painter, but now works as a multidisciplinary artist. His exhibits incorporate photography, installation, text and performance. They are primarily concerned with memory and history. His works typically involve issues of human destruction- from genocide to animal extinction. He has won the Richard Branson Mars 2025 award from the Walden 3 foundation and has exhibited in Germany, Thailand, Turkey, Russia, Armenia the United States and China.

== Early life and education ==
Jamgochian was born in 1971 in San Francisco. His father, Peter as well as his paternal Grandparents, Vahan and Gertrude were painters. The Jamgochian family originated from the Kharpet district of the Ottoman Empire, in the town of Egin, where they had lived since the fall of Nineveh in 612 B.C. His great grandfather, Avedis, translated the poem "Paradise Lost" into Turkish and was exiled. The family that remained were murdered by the Ottoman government during the Hamidian massacres of 1896 . The Jamgochian family founded the Armenian colony of Glendale, California in 1910 . Nevdon Jamgochian trained as an artist under the supervision of his family and later at the Savannah College of art and Design.

== Work ==
Many of Jamgochian's works call attention to alternate or fictive histories, which highlight the "real" history, which is hidden. For example, in his "Bagradian project" he has taken a minor character in Franz Werfel's 1933 novel "The 40 Days of Musa Dagh", and has created a fiction that this was real historical figure who had a successful life as a painter in the 20th century. Of course, this is a counter factual argument to the Turkish government's claim that the Armenian Genocide never occurred.

== Recent work ==
The Bagradian project consists of paints made by Jamgochian, but signed by his fictional artist- Stephan Bagradian, purportedly from the 1920s through the 1970s. He has written a 200-page "autobiography" of the artist to support this work and is touring the United States in 2015–2016 with a show "by" Bagradian. In 2014 he also has made 1,500,000 medallions with the phrase "1 Armenian" on each to mark the 100th anniversary of the Armenian Genocide in 2015 and to represent the number of Armenians murdered at this time. He is distributing these in around the world, starting with Turkey in April. As a side project, Jamgochian also installs chrome plates with the Percy Shelly poem "Ozymandius" inscribed on it on building slated for destruction. He has done this in Thailand, Turkey and China. The idea behind the installation and poem is that nothing that humans build can last. In 2015, Jamgochian is releasing two short films. One deals with the Ottoman slaughter of 80,000 dogs through starvation and is called "Dogs as Metaphor" and the other is titled "Stuck" which documents Jamgochian's Ozymandius project in Bangkok, Thailand. He is also a writer for several arts publications, including Hyperallergic and Artcore Journal.

Nevdon Jamgochian currently lives in Kuala Lumpur, Malaysia and works at the International School of Kuala Lumpur (ISKL).
