= Beth Van Hoesen =

American visual artist (1926–2010)

- Born: Elizabeth Marie Van Hoesen; 1926; Boise, Idaho, U.S.
- Died: November 26, 2010 (aged 83–84); San Francisco, California, U.S.
- Education: Stanford University, Ecole des Beaux Arts de Fontainbleau, Académie Julian, Académie de la Grande Chaumière, California School of Fine Arts
- Known for: Printmaking, drawing, painting
- Spouse: Mark Adams

Chow by Beth Van Hoesen, 1985, drypoint hand colored with watercolor, Honolulu Museum of Art

Beth Van Hoesen (1926 – November 26, 2010), sometimes known as Beth Van Hoesen Adams, was an American artist who was best known for her prints and drawings of animals and botanical subjects.

== Biography ==
Elizabeth "Beth" Marie Van Hoesen was born in Boise, Idaho, the daughter of Enderse Van Hoesen and Freda Van Hoesen. She earned a B.A. degree from Stanford University in 1948. After graduation, she continued her studies in France at the Ecole des Beaux Arts de Fontainbleau (1948), the Académie Julian (1948 to 1950), and the Académie de la Grande Chaumière (1948 to 1950). In 1951, she enrolled in the California School of Fine Arts, where she studied under the painters David Park and Clyfford Still.

Although Van Hoesen is best known for her animal portraits, her other subjects ranged from people to landscapes, still lives, and botanical subjects. She worked mainly in print media, especially etching, using drawings extensively for preparatory work. Her style is lively and playful, with attention to the telling detail. In the 1970s, she was diagnosed with depression; it severely affected her ability to draw for a time, and she began to keep a diary, which was published in 1975.

During her lifetime she exhibited at museums and galleries across the United States. In the early 1980s, a traveling exhibition of her work was organized by the Art Museum Association; it toured the United States for three years. Another touring exhibition took place the year of her death. Her work won a number of awards, including a 1981 Award of Honor in Graphics from the San Francisco Arts Commission, and a 1993 Distinguished Artist Award from the California Society of Printmakers.

Public collections holding her work include the New York Museum of Modern Art, the Art Institute of Chicago, the Brooklyn Museum, the Butler Institute of American Art, the Cincinnati Art Museum, the El Paso Museum of Art, the Fine Arts Museums of San Francisco, the Weisman Art Museum, Honolulu Museum of Art, the Oakland Museum of California, the Nelson-Atkins Museum of Art, the Muscatine Art Center in Muscatine, Iowa, and the Victoria and Albert Museum in London.

The artist's print archive was given to the Portland Art Museum.

A catalogue raisonné of her work was issued in 2011.

== Personal life ==
In 1953, she married fellow artist Mark Adams. At their home in San Francisco's Castro neighborhood, where she lived for nearly 50 years, Van Hoesen and Adams hosted a weekly drawing group attended by artists such as Wayne Thiebaud and Theophilus Brown.
