= Treu Ergeben Hecht =

American photographer

- Born: May 1875; Tahiti
- Died: 1937
- Occupation: Photographer

Treu Ergeben Hecht (May 1875 - 1937) was an American photographer. Born in Tahiti, he became a photographer in San Francisco, California and negative producer of old photographs from the 1850s onward. His photographs show the early development and evolution of San Francisco. Many of them are held in the San Francisco Public Library.
