= Mark Adams (artist) =

American visual artist (1925–2006)

- Born: October 27, 1925; Fort Plain, New York, U.S.
- Died: January 24, 2006 (aged 80); San Francisco, California, U.S.
- Education: Hans Hofmann, Jean Lurçat
- Known for: Watercolor, tapestry design, stained-glass design
- Spouse: Beth Van Hoesen

Mark Adams (October 27, 1925 – January 24, 2006) was an American artist best known for his watercolors of still life subjects. He was also a designer of tapestries and stained glass.

== Biography ==
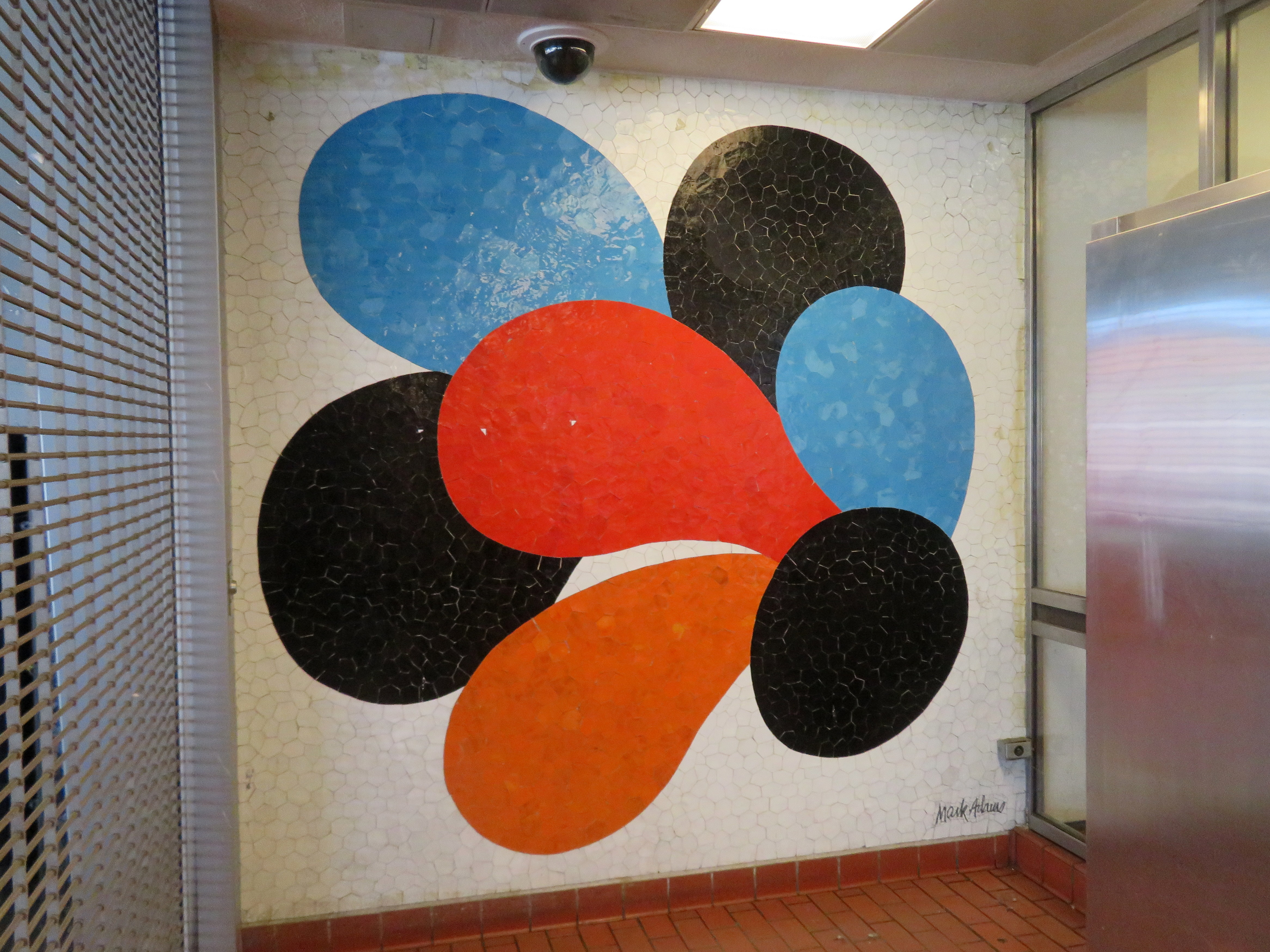
A tile mosaic by Adams at MacArthur station

Adams was born in Fort Plain, New York. He attended Syracuse University School of Fine Arts for two years (1943 to 1945) before moving to New York City to study with the painter Hans Hofmann (1945 to 1947). He later went to France to study tapestry-making with Jean Lurçat (1955).

Early in his career, Adams was a designer of tapestries and stained glass. He designed the windows for Temple Emanu-El and Grace Cathedral in San Francisco. He created over two dozen tapestries, some of which are in the de Young Museum and the San Francisco International Airport. He was commissioned to create a 30-foot tapestry for the headquarters of Weyerhaeuser. In 1963, he won the Rome Prize.

In search of a more intimate and smaller-scale medium, Adams turned to watercolors in the mid 1970s, and it was this work that gained him the greatest recognition. Most of his watercolors are still lifes, often of flowers or single objects like hats; he also painted landscapes. His style combines luminous washes of intense color with sparely drawn subjects, and his compositions often feature effects of light such as strong shadows, reflections, and refractions.

Adams taught art at the University of California, Davis, the San Francisco Art Institute, and elsewhere.

Adams fell ill in December 2005 and died the following month.

== Personal life ==
In 1954, Adams married the printmaker Beth Van Hoesen; they lived in San Francisco for many years.

Adams claimed that he came up with the name "hungry i" for a new nightclub being opened by a friend in San Francisco's North Beach neighborhood. The hungry i became a famous Beat Generation gathering place, but the origins of the name are disputed, with a number of plausible stories in circulation.
