= Pam DeLuco =

American artist

- Born: 1968 (age 57–58)
- Known for: Crafts, Book art, Papermaking
- Notable work: Paper Dolls: stories from women who served

Pam DeLuco (born 1968) is an American contemporary textile and fiber artist, book artist and papermaker, and co-founder of Shotwell Paper Mill based in San Francisco. She is noted for her military paper doll project.

== History ==
DeLuco studied in Los Altos, California, and Notre Dame, Indiana. She has traveled extensively, studying indigenous handicrafts and artisans around the world.

DeLuco's work explores the lives of women in the military in her paper dolls series Paper Dolls: stories from women who served. In 2008 she became involved with the Combat Paper Project. She formed Combat Paper Press with author and combat papermaker Nathan J. Lewis in 2009. She has worked with veterans, teaching paper-making at workshops in which they use their uniforms as the raw material for pulp to make hand-made paper. DeLuco says that this has changed her perception of people in the military in that instead of seeing people as "macho" she said that "making art with them made them really appear sensitive to me."

=== Television ===
DeLuco was featured on the 2007 television show What Not To Wear, Season 5, episode 20. She appeared on the 2014 PBS show Craft in America: Service, Season 6, episode 1.
