= Edgar Mathews =

American architect

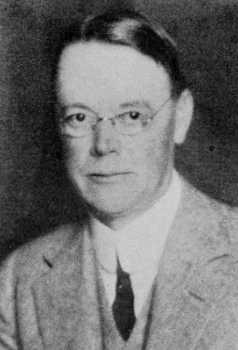
- Born: Edgar Aschael Mathews; September 8, 1866; Oakland, California, US
- Died: December 31, 1946 (aged 80); San Francisco, California, US
- Occupation: Architect
- Spouse: Katherine Carlton Dart (m. 1891)
- Children: 2

Edgar Aschael Mathews (September 8, 1866 – December 31, 1946) was an architect who worked in the Bay Area of California, particularly in San Francisco. He primarily designed houses but was also responsible for some Christian Science churches and commercial and government buildings.

== Early life and training ==
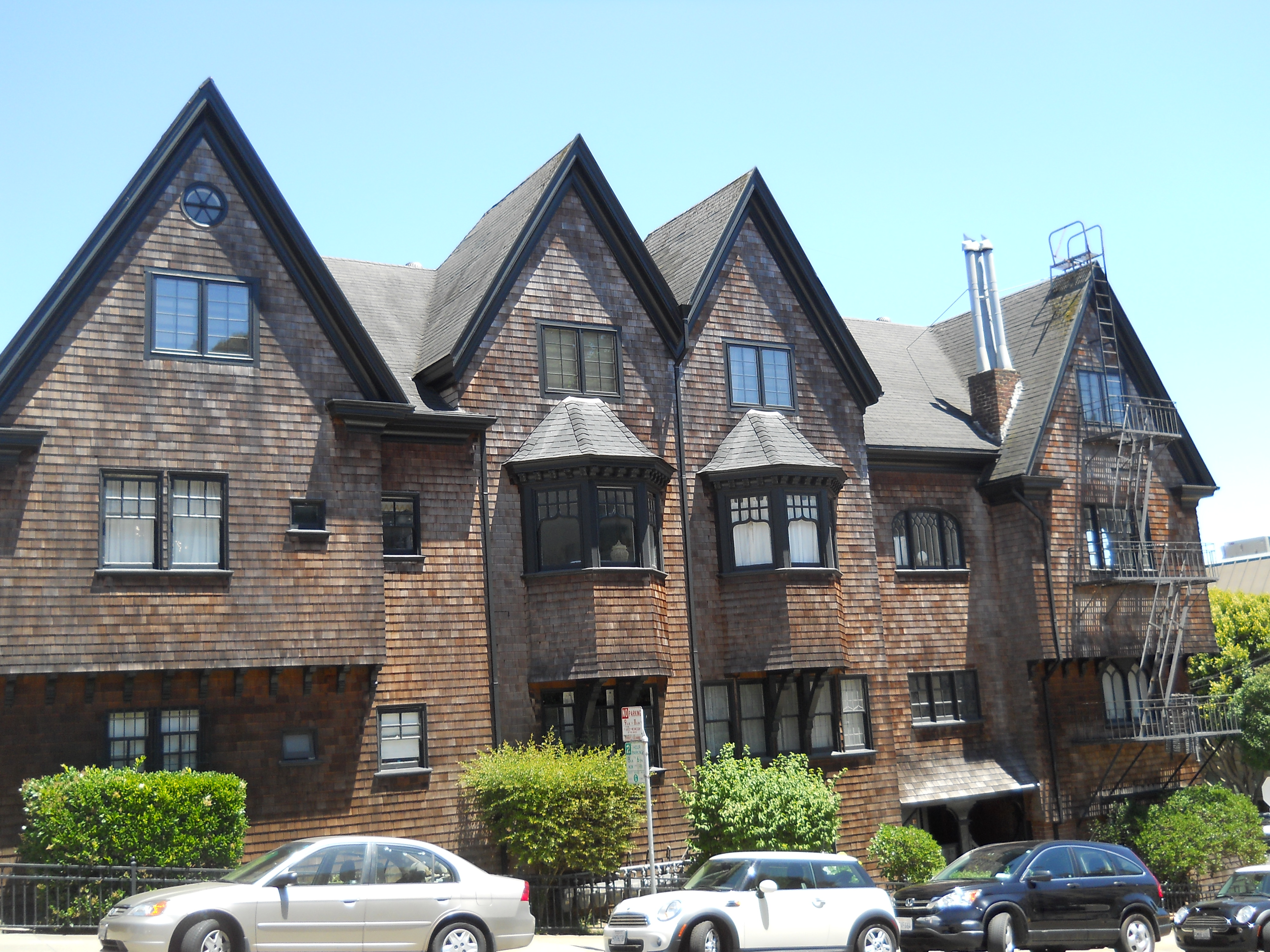
Shingled apartments at 2100–06 Lyon Street, San Francisco, designed by Edgar Mathews in 1905

Edgar Mathews was born in Oakland, the third son of Julius Case Mathews and his wife Pauline, née McCracken. His father was an architect and all three sons trained with him; the eldest, Walter, went into partnership with him, while the second, Arthur, became an artist. Edgar received further training at the Van Der Naillen School of Engineering, from which he graduated in 1888, and after working for his father and others, opened his own architectural office in 1895. He moved to San Francisco soon after, and most of his work was built there.

== Career ==
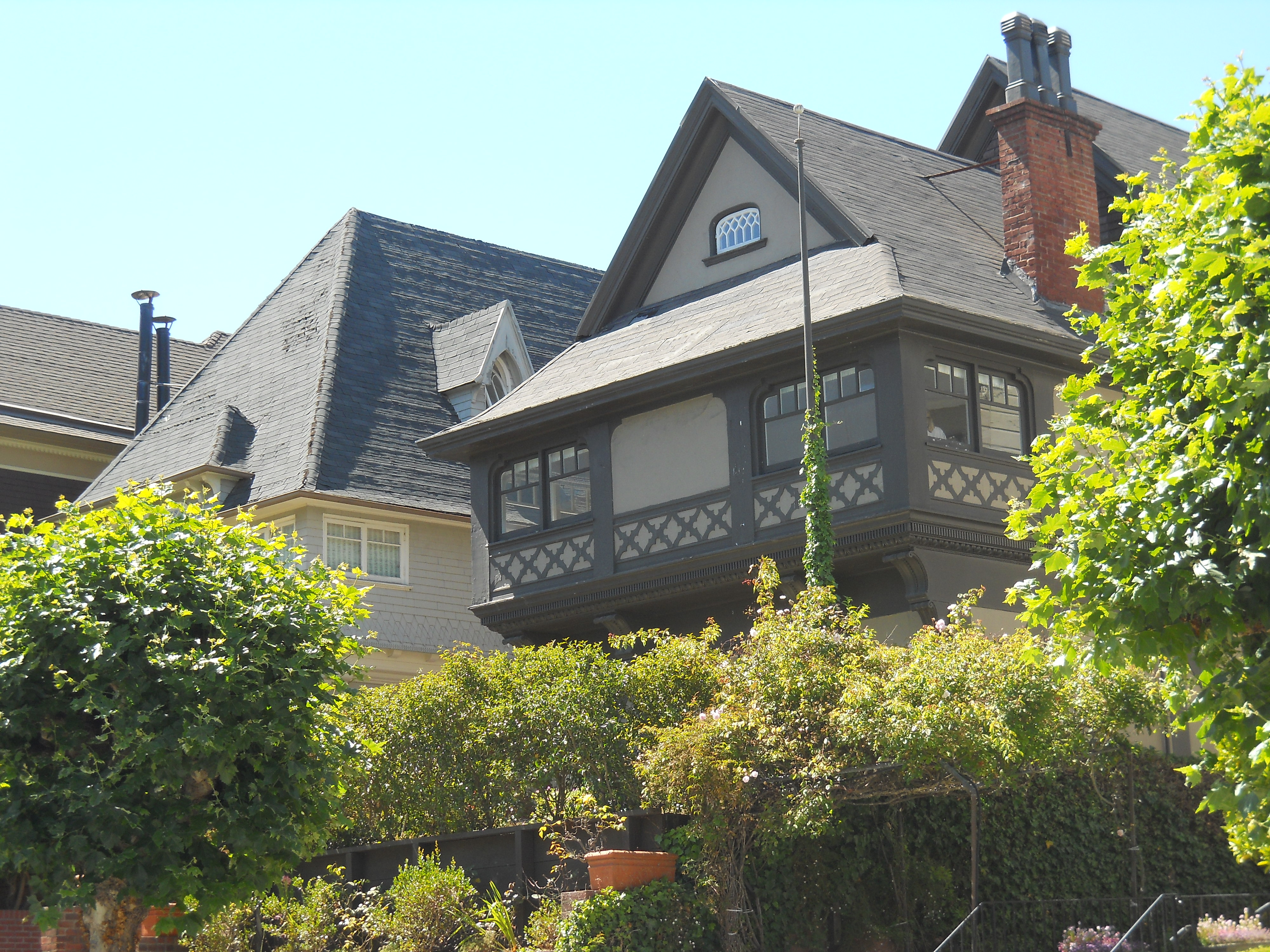
2508 Green Street (1895)

Mathews designed a large number of houses, particularly in the Pacific Heights neighborhood of San Francisco, where in 1908 he built 2980 Vallejo Street for himself and his wife, Katherine née Dart. He drew on English arts and crafts conventions: his houses are often in a half-timbered style with high-pitched roofs suggesting English Tudor, and even more often squarish and clad in unpainted redwood shingles. He also designed apartment houses, usually in the shingled style. Both his houses and his apartments usually have porches and a low wall around the lot; his apartment buildings characteristically have separate entrances for each unit. His work is the primary reason for Pacific Heights' reputation for shingle-style buildings.

In San Francisco, houses by Mathews include 2361 Washington Street (1898, for William Gerstle) and 2421 Pierce Street (1897 or c. 1903, for James Irvine), both in the Tudor style, and 2505 Divisadero Street (1899), former home of rock musician Kirk Hammett, in Georgian style. Two houses designed by Mathews in Berkeley are city landmarks: the Cornelious Beach Bradley House (1897) and the Benjamin Ide Wheeler House (1900; remodeled by Lewis Hobart). Of his apartment houses, those at 1390–1392 Page Street and 200 Central Avenue are in a characteristic Shingle-Craftsman style; the row of flats at 2100 Lyon Street is typical of his shingled apartment houses in Pacific Heights, and the row at 100–114 Walnut Street (the Stein apartments) also has an unusually varied roofline.

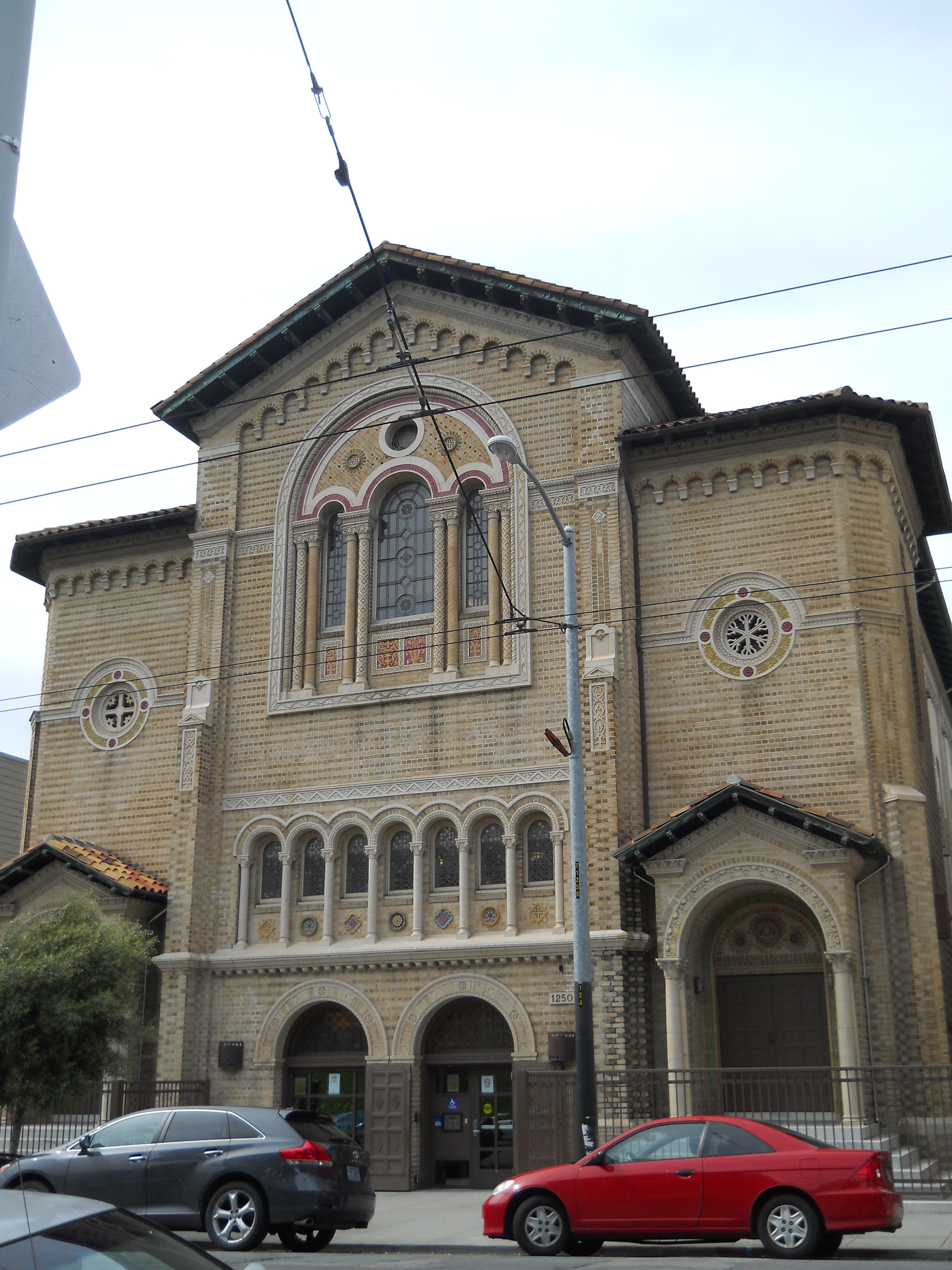
Third Church of Christ, Scientist, San Francisco (1917)

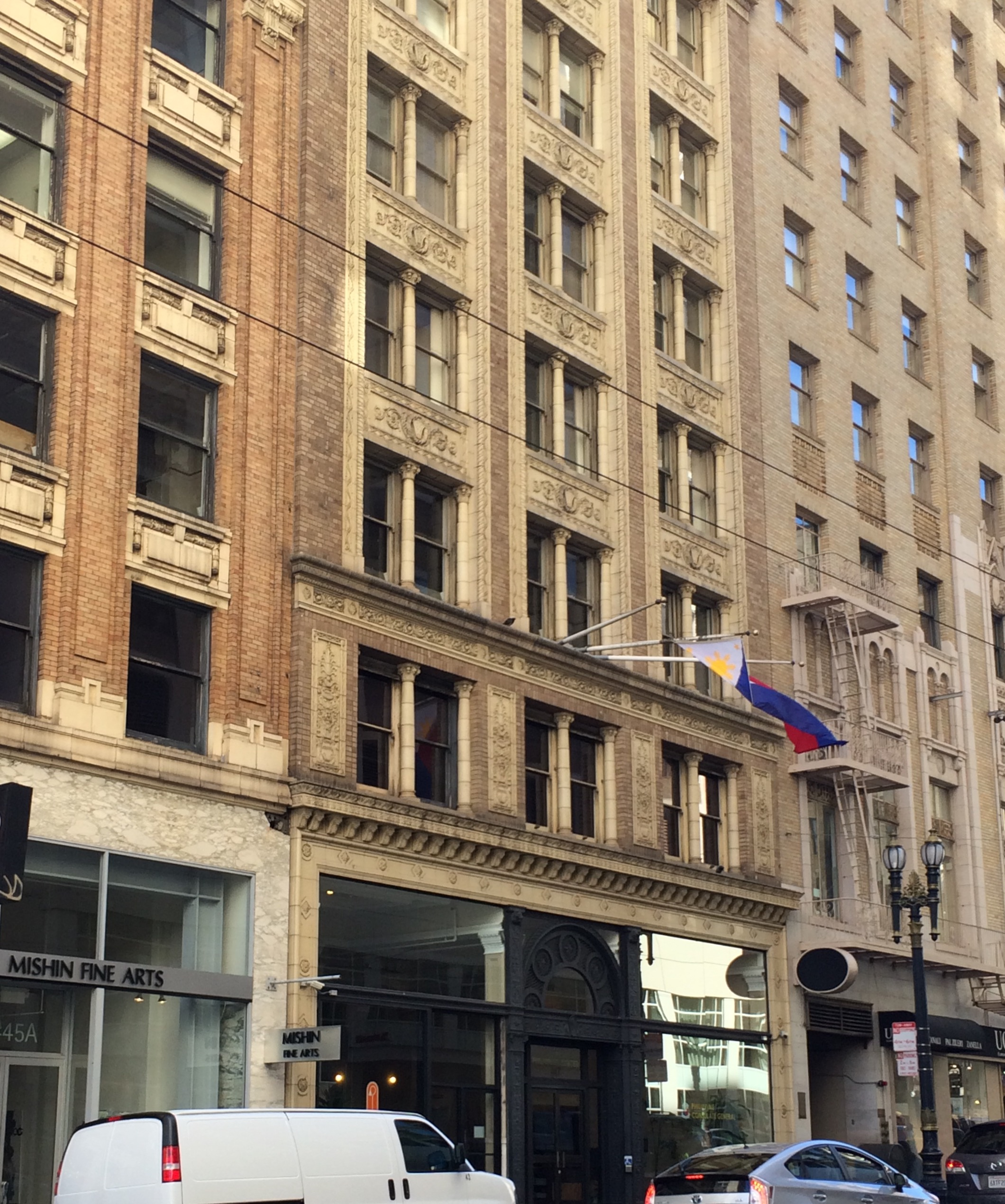
447 Sutter Street, San Francisco, designed by Mathews for PG&E in 1916

As a Christian Scientist, Mathews was commissioned to design the First Church of Christ, Scientist in San Francisco (1912); for this and again for the similar Third Church of Christ, Scientist (1917) he used a Byzantine-Romanesque style in variegated brick with polychrome terracotta decoration. Writing in The Architectural Review, William Winthrop Kent singled the Third Church out for special praise. It has now been converted into housing for seniors.

Later in his career, Mathews was a proponent of Renaissance revival architecture; an example of his commercial designs in this style is the highly ornamented 447 Sutter Street (1916), for Pacific Gas and Electric. He also designed government buildings in Sacramento; in 1919 he won the $500 prize in the competition to design a new courthouse for Santa Barbara, but it remained unbuilt for lack of funds, and after the 1925 earthquake, a design by William Mooser, the second-place entrant, was built instead. The base of Douglas Tilden's 1907 monument to Padre Junipero Serra in Golden Gate Park is also by Mathews.

Mathews was vice-president of the San Francisco Chapter of the American Institute of Architects from 1913 to 1916 and president in 1917. He was president of the California Board of Architectural Examiners in 1915–18.

== Private life and death ==
Mathews married Katherine Carlton Dart on December 8, 1891, and they had two daughters. In 1935 they moved to 1956 Great Highway, which he had also designed. He died there on New Year's Eve 1946.

== Lawsuits ==
Mathews was involved in two lawsuits. In 1908 he was sued by a former client in San Rafael for twice designing a similar house to be built close to the client's, which the client had wanted to be unique. The judge ruled in favor of Mathews, saying: "If this injunction were granted it would have the practical effect of putting architect Mathews out of business, because his personality expresses itself in a certain type of house, and this injunction seeks to restrain him from constructing that type." In 1914 Mathews sued the Board of Trustees of the San Francisco Public Library for $11,900, his fee and time in entering the competition to design the main library; he argued that the winning design by George W. Kelham (the building now the Asian Art Museum) plagiarized Cass Gilbert's Detroit Public Library. The judge threw out the lawsuit, pointing out that Gilbert had been on the competition jury.
