= Walter J. Mathews =

American architect

Walter J. Mathews (2 May 1850 – 20 November 1947) was an American architect based in Oakland, California. He is best known for designing the First Unitarian Church of Oakland, and the Oakland mansion of Frank M. "Borax" Smith. He was active in the architecture firms J. C. Mathews & Son, and Kysor & Mathews.

== Biography ==
His father, Julius C. Mathews, was also an architect. In 1866, the family moved from Markesan, Wisconsin to Oakland, California. Walter and his brothers trained in the office of their father, J. C. Mathews & Son. He joined his father's office in 1874 to 1875. Walter Mathews' younger brother Arthur Frank Mathews became a prominent San Francisco artist and furniture designer. The third son of Julius Mathews, Edgar, also became a well known Bay Area architect.

After he spent a few years in Los Angeles, Mathews became a partner with architect Ezra F. Kysor in the architecture firm Kysor & Mathews. Among the Los Angeles projects he collaborated on with Kysor were the Cathedral of Saint Vibiana and Childs' Grand Opera House, which was later to become the first Los Angeles venue of the Orpheum vaudeville circuit.

Mathews returned to Oakland in 1877, becoming a partner in his father's firm until establishing his own practice in Oakland in 1886. In the 1890s he served as Oakland city architect.

His projects were typical of the late nineteenth and early twentieth centuries, including office buildings, hotels, theaters, clubs, commercial buildings, churches, and houses. He remained in practice in Oakland until at least 1940.

== Works ==
- C. A. Belden House
- First Unitarian Church of Oakland
- Key System Mole Ferry Terminal
