= Lucia Kleinhans Mathews =

Lucia Mathews (née Kleinhans) was an American painter born and raised in San Francisco, California, primarily known for her work depicting California landscapes and the state flower, the California Poppy. A lifelong Californian, she was the wife and partner of artist, Arthur Frank Mathews, a well-regarded painter, muralist, and teacher in the Bay Area. Together they founded the Furniture Shop and the Philopolis Press in 1906. Her work is featured in museum collections throughout California and the United States and is evocative of the California Arts and Crafts style.

== Early life and education ==
Lucia was born in San Francisco, California on 29 August 1870 to John and Elizabeth (nee Ribble) Kleinhans, “who were of German origin” originally settled in San Francisco in the late 1860s, settling on Fell Street (Jones, 159). Interested in art from a young age, the young Lucia showcased her talent when she was about six years old, creating a “small pencil drawing of remarkable realism that shows her baby sister, Ida, nude, sitting on a chamber pot” (Jones, 159). After completing her “early education in San Francisco’s public schools” Lucia sought a career in art, enrolling in “the spring of 1888… in the Grammar School of Mills Seminary and College in Oakland,” taking courses in their certificate program (Jones, 159). Mills College (as it is now called) was an early advocate for women’s higher education in California. While there Lucia learned “making sketches and paintings under direct observations of nature,” akin to the French Impressionists painting ‘au plein-air’ and was popular in California Impressionist art at this time (Jones, 160). After a year at Mills, Lucia transferred in 1889 to San Francisco’s California School of Design which “offered [her] professionally focused surroundings that emphasized artistic pursuits above the academic” (Jones, 159). Indeed, the school was founded in 1871 as one of the first art schools in California and has since educated some of the nation’s most prominent artists. It was there that she took classes with Raymond Yelland, and Arthur Frank Mathews, who would become the school’s director in 1890 and the two would eventually marry in 1894. Mathews, educated more formally in Europe and Paris, instituted many changes to the school, such as deemphasizing courses studying antique sculpture in favor of those on human anatomy using live models, in classrooms separated by gender (Jones, 161). As Lucia thrived Mathews took notice of her prodigious talents, remarking that “She can draw better than I can!” (Jones, 161). While at the California School of Design she met and befriended fellow female artists, Florence Lundborg, Marion Holden, and Louise Schwamm (Jones, 161). This meeting began a career of frequent collaboration between the two artists, seen early in the 1893 Spring Exhibition catalog for the Mark Hopkins Institute of Art where Lucia contributed to the book’s interior and cover design (Jones, 162).

== Early Career and the 1906 San Francisco Earthquake ==
After their marriage in 1894, the Mathews’ embarked on a European grand tour in the summer 1898, with Lucia’s friend, Louise Schwamm. The trip began in London, where “Lucia [started] a travel diary and sketchbook [recording] her [honest] impressions and observations of the city’s art and architecture” and galleries (Jones, 166). From there they traveled to Paris for a lengthy stay, where she was impressed with the paintings exhibited at the Paris Salon of 1898; after Paris they traveled to Italy, visiting Florence, Rome, Venice and Turin. During an extended stay in Paris, Arthur established a small atelier, while Lucia continued her studies in art, briefly enrolling in James McNeill Whistler’s, Academie Carmen (Jones, 168). The scholar Harvey Jones notes that “women from California claimed an unusual proportion of the class” (Jones, 168). Indeed, when looking at California Tonalist painting, popular from 1890 t0 1930, the style of Whistler, particularly in their subdued tones, is keenly felt in Lucia’s work in the 1890s/00s. The 1906 San Francisco earthquake and fire destroyed much of the city, though the flames spared the Mathews’ home, the disaster did destroy a lot of their work which was privately held in the city. The destruction of San Francisco, the state’s largest and most urban city at the time, was a galvanizing moment for the Mathew’s. Soon thereafter they established the Furniture Shop and the Philopolis Press with the hope of “transforming San Francisco [through their designs] into a new Utopia, one imbued with the luminosity of the California landscape, the harmony of classical art, the grace of Art Nouveau and the populist ideals of the Arts & Crafts movement” (Akron Art Museum).

== The Furniture Shop, Philopolis, and the California Decorative Style ==
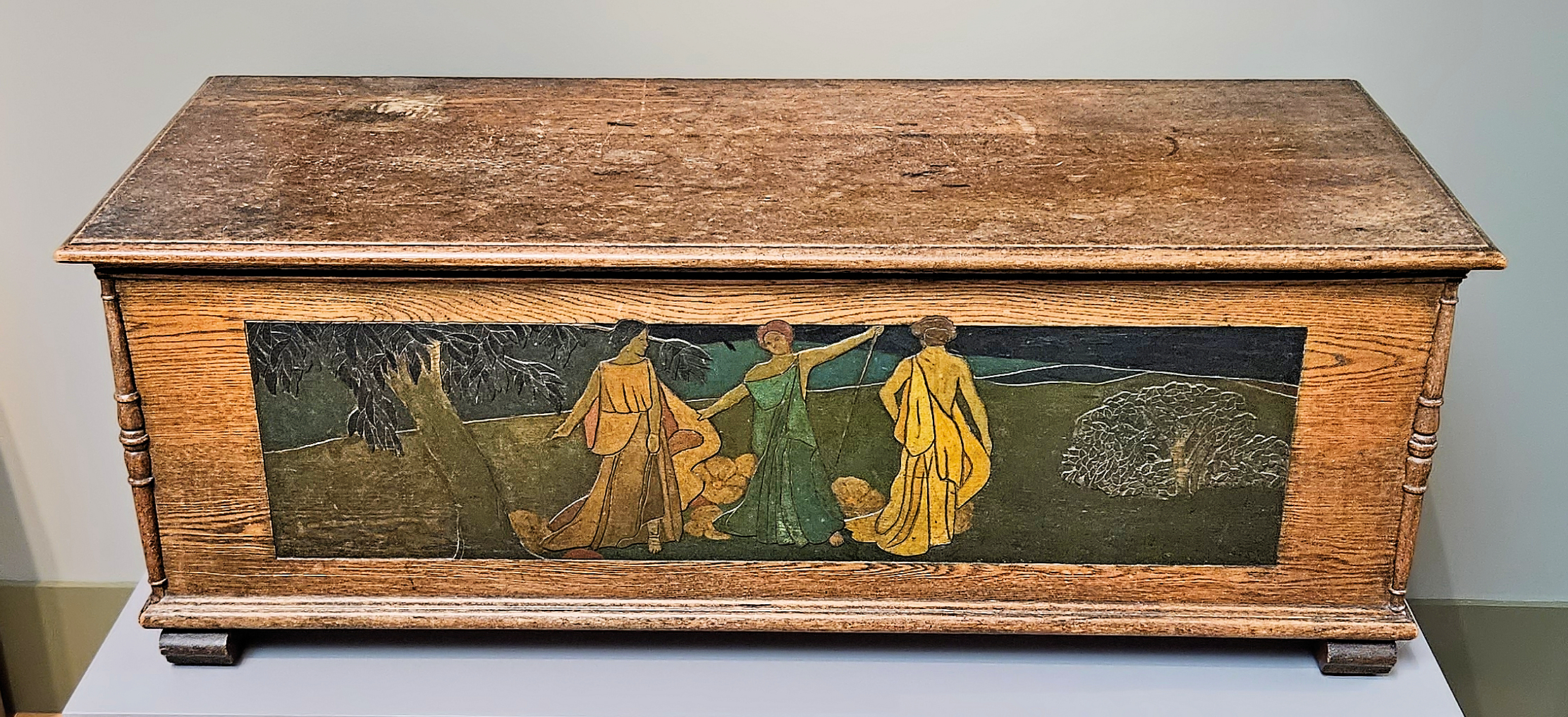
Bridal chest in California Decorative Style created by Lucia and her husband.

The Furniture Shop and the Philopolis Press were established with the hope of revitalizing, artistically, the city, now in the throngs of intense reconstruction. Their shop, housed in a bungalow designed by Arthur, included a book and magazine press, as well as a furniture shop with manufacturer John Zeile, Jr., at 1717 California Street (Jones, 219-21). This period saw the rise of many similar artist workshops such as the Omega Workshops in London and Roycroft in East Aurora, New York. At the shop, the Mathews’ designed and decorated furniture, as well as “carpets, draperies, rugs, studio and art rooms” according to a 1910 advertisement in Philopolis Magazine (Jones, 222). Their clients were wide ranging, from corporate commissions, to small, private commissions for furnishings and small decorative objects such as boxes, frames, and lamps, which Lucia often carved herself from wood. These small decorative items are what Lucia is today most well-known for, a box depicting Monterey Cypress trees and Poppy flowers is one of her most recognizable pieces. A surviving gouache of their designs for Decorative Furnishings for a Bedchamber, is one such example of their collaborative work, where Lucia’s hand can be clearly seen in the decoration of the furniture and lighting, while Arthur designed the furniture forms. The influence of Art Nouveau and Japanese design is keenly felt in all their decorative work. In September 1916 the Philopolis magazine ceased publication and since they primarily advertised in it, the Shop soon followed by 1920. Lucia was particularly interested in studying flowers and her use of vivid and dramatic colors, rendered in detail in watercolor or pastel, are some of her most recognizable stylistic motifs. In their printed work, either in the magazine or in the books they published, Lucia filled the covers, title pages, and borders with poppies and other native plants.

== Later life and death ==
Lucia was a lifelong member of the Sketch Club, “the first women’s art club founded on the West Coast,” which served as a counter to the all-male Bohemian Club in San Francisco. From 1908-1909 she served as their president and contributed designs “for their posters and pamphlets” (Jones, 186). Even though the Furniture Shop and Press closed by 1920, Lucia continued making small decorative objects in a variety of mediums, notably a yearly floral calendar which she sent to friends and relatives and survive today because they became “treasured keepsakes” worthy of framing (Jones, 194). Inspired by the colors of the 1915 Panama Pacific International Exposition in San Francisco, Lucia’s color palette began to change, instead she employed “more vivid, higher keyed ranges” of color instead of the vibrant and natural colors of her previous work, as well as exposing more of the white of the paper, in turn highlighting her use of color and detail (Jones, 207). This changed last for the remainder of her painting career. One of her last larger works is a study of her husband, Arthur, now elderly, during one of their last trips to the Monterey Peninsula in the early 1940s. Widowed in February 1945, she continued living in San Francisco—they had no children—and in a 1948 letter to a local art historian, Brother Cornelius, she derided how “nowadays all painting… have gone modern in a dreadful way” after a visit to the Veterans Museum (Jones, 213). By the 1950s her health began to decline due to the onset of Parkinson’s Disease, and in 1951, after the death of her younger brother, moved to Los Angeles to be with family. Not long after she was admitted to the West Olympic Sanatorium in Los Angeles until her death on July 14, 1955—her death certificate lists her occupation as “homemaker” (Jones, 215). Her remains were cremated and interred with her husbands’ in “matching copper bookend urns at San Francisco’s Columbarium (Jones, 215).

== Legacy ==
Though Arthur and Lucia Mathews are significant in the history of California art, Lucia’s legacy has largely been forgotten. While a talented and acknowledged artist in her own right, her work is always featured in connection to her husbands’, more emphasis is placed on her decorative work and not her body of work. It was not until after a series of major exhibitions about California art and design from the 1970s onward did scholars and reappraisals of her work begin. This increasing interest culminated in a major exhibition of their work—as singular artists and collaborators—titled “California as Muse: The Art of Arthur and Lucia Mathews” which ran from 2006 to 2007 at the Oakland Museum of California, whose permanent collection houses a majority of their work and archives. Lucia’s work is in permanent collections in museums across California; the Smithsonian; Metropolitan Museum of Art; Yale Art Gallery; and the forthcoming Chipstone Foundation Museum of American Arts in Crafts.
