= Arthur Frank Mathews =

American painter

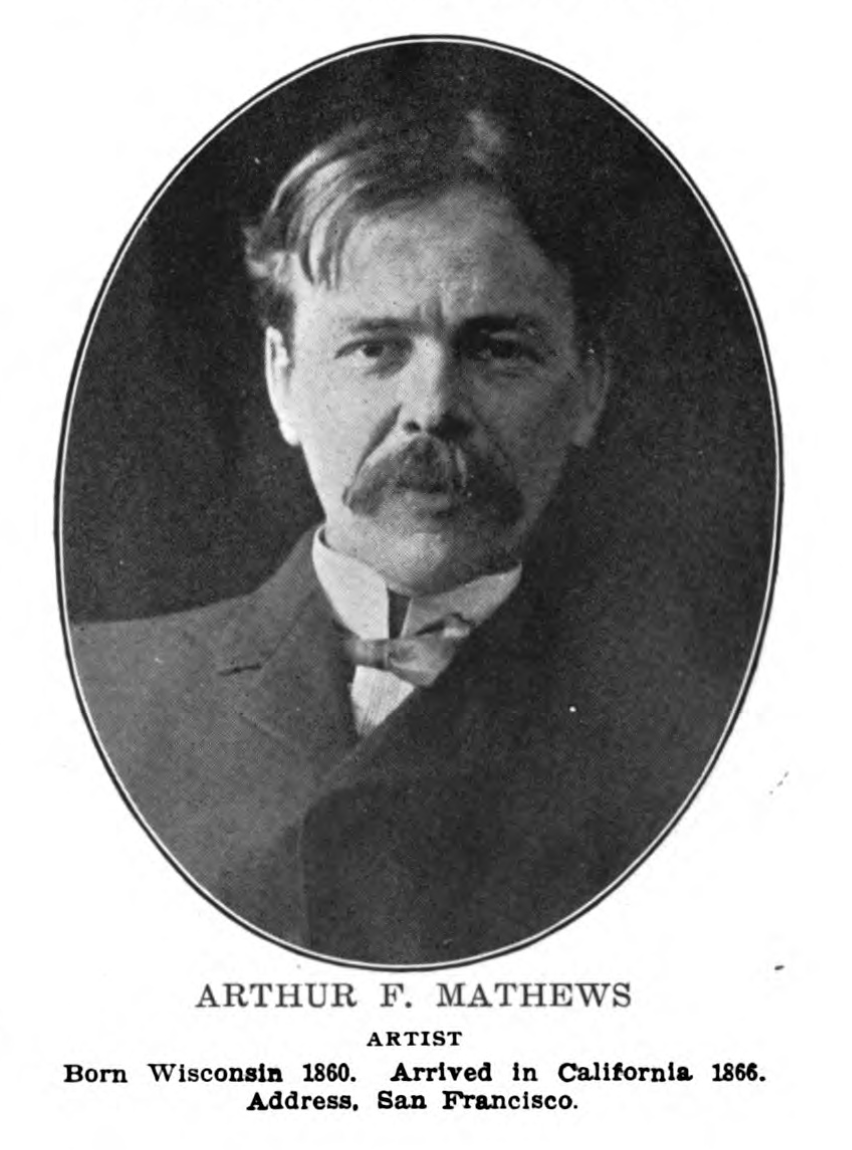
- Born: Arthur Frank Mathews; October 1, 1860; Markesan, Wisconsin, U.S.
- Died: February 19, 1945 (aged 84); San Francisco, California, U.S.
- Education: San Francisco School of Design, Académie Julian
- Known for: Painting
- Movement: Arts and Crafts Movement, Art Nouveau, Tonalism
- Awards: Grand Gold Medal, Académie Julian, 1886; Gold Medal for Distinguished Achievement in Painting, American Institute of Architects, 1923

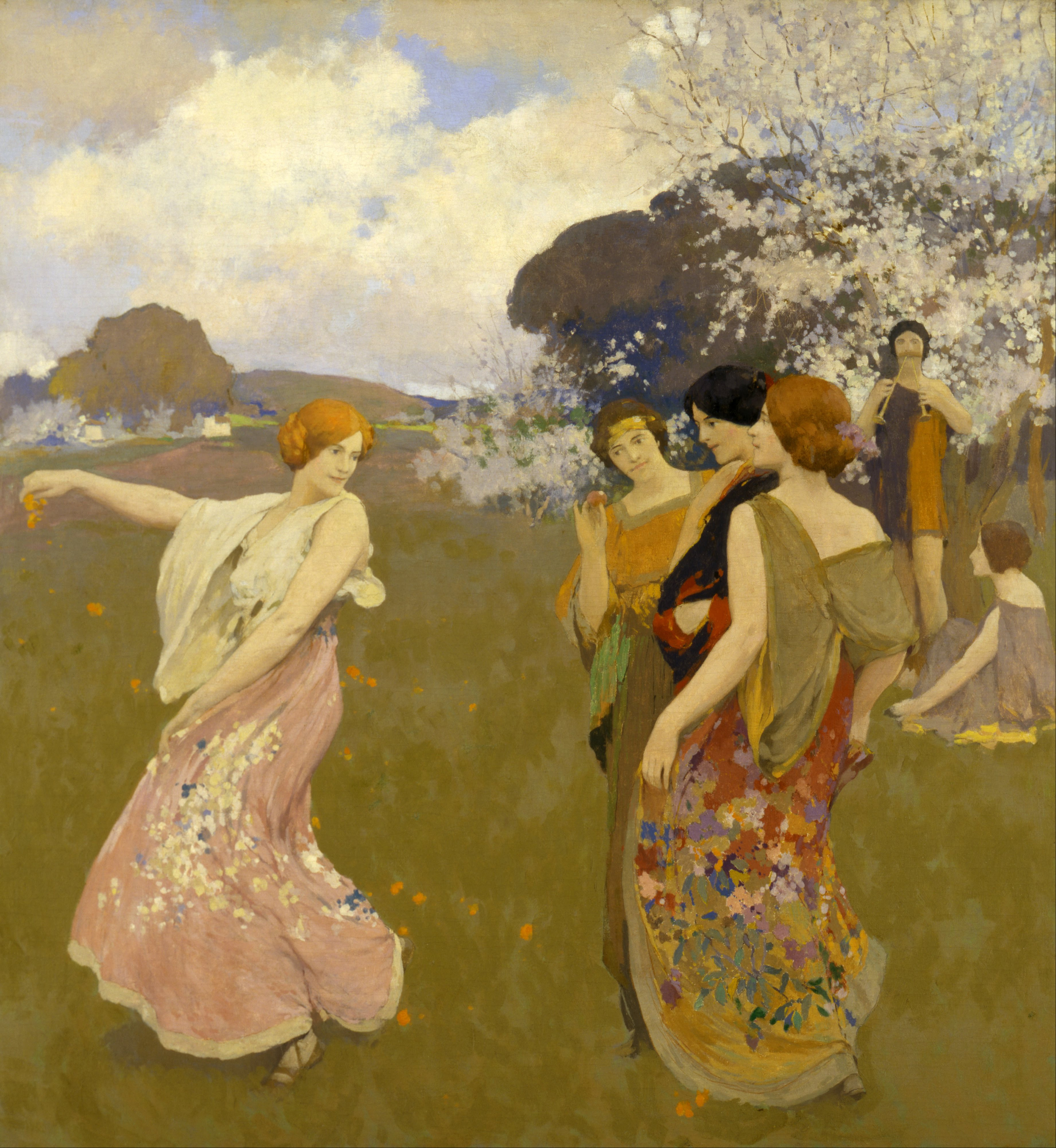
Spring Dance

Arthur F. Mathews (October 1, 1860 – February 19, 1945) was an American Tonalist painter who was one of the founders of the American Arts and Crafts Movement. Trained as an architect and artist, he and his wife Lucia Kleinhans Mathews had a significant effect on the evolution of Californian art in the late 19th and early 20th centuries. His students include Granville Redmond, Xavier Martinez, Armin Hansen, Percy Gray, Gottardo Piazzoni, Ralph Stackpole, Mary Colter, Maynard Dixon, Rinaldo Cuneo and Francis McComas.

== Early years ==
Mathews was born in Markesan, Wisconsin, and lived there until he was six years old. His father, Julius Mathews, was an architect and moved the family to San Francisco in 1866. Like his brothers Walter and Edgar, Mathews learned architecture from his father.

He then went on and studied painting at the California School of Design (later called San Francisco Art Institute), where he was influenced by Virgil Macey Williams. In San Francisco he also worked as a designer and illustrator at a lithography shop. He studied art in Paris at the Académie Julian from 1885 to 1889, where he was influenced by the academic classicism of his teachers Gustave Boulanger and Jules Lefebvre, the tonalism of James Abbott McNeill Whistler, and the symbolism of Pierre Puvis de Chavannes.

== Life in San Francisco ==
Upon his return from Paris, Mathews taught life classes at the San Francisco Art Students League and the California School of Design. He became director of the latter in 1890, and in 1894, married Lucia Kleinhans, one of his art students. Although he was occasionally criticized for his autocratic approach to teaching, which was based on the French paradigm for the Barbizon school, he vigorously supported the presence of female students at the School of Design and published in 1891 a rebuttal to Emil Carlsen, a former director of the school, who declared that women pupils were inferior and indifferent students. In 1904 the San Francisco District Attorney compelled Mathews, in his capacity as the school's Director, to investigate charges brought by Albert DeRome that he was seriously injured in a hazing ritual devised by fellow student (and later renowned artist) Armin Hansen. He continued to teach there until shortly after the great 1906 San Francisco earthquake.

Following the earthquake, he and his wife Lucia collaborated with the entrepreneur John Zeile to open the Furniture Shop in San Francisco. There he could unleash his combined skills as a craftsman, designer and painter. Mathews and Zeile also established Philopolis Press and published the monthly Philopolis magazine, which promoted Arts and Crafts aesthetics in the rebuilding of the city. Among his many mural commissions was a twelve-panel series in the State Capitol Building in Sacramento. Other major commissions included murals for the Oakland Public Library, the Mechanics' Institute Library, the Lane Medical Library at Stanford University's medical school campus in San Francisco, the Supreme Court Chambers of the California Supreme Court Building in San Francisco, and the Court of Palms at the Panama–Pacific International Exposition. The Mathews mural Vision of Saint Francis, originally created for the Savings Union Bank in San Francisco, is now in the collection of the Crocker Art Museum.

In the late 19th and early 20th centuries Mathews and his wife frequently sketched on the Monterey Peninsula and in 1907 he helped organize the inaugural exhibition at the Hotel Del Monte Art Gallery. At this time Mathews joined William Keith in opposing the restoration of the Spanish missions in California, which Edwin Deakin vigorously campaigned to restore as functioning religious communities.

== Death and legacy ==
He died at his home in San Francisco in 1945.

Mathews was a master of many media: oil painting, watercolor, pastel, gouache and fresco. He and Lucia designed detailed interior decoration schemes in what became known as the California Decorative Style. They created a variety of furniture, boxes, carved and painted picture frames and many other decorative objects, and even large stained glass windows.

=== Museum collections ===
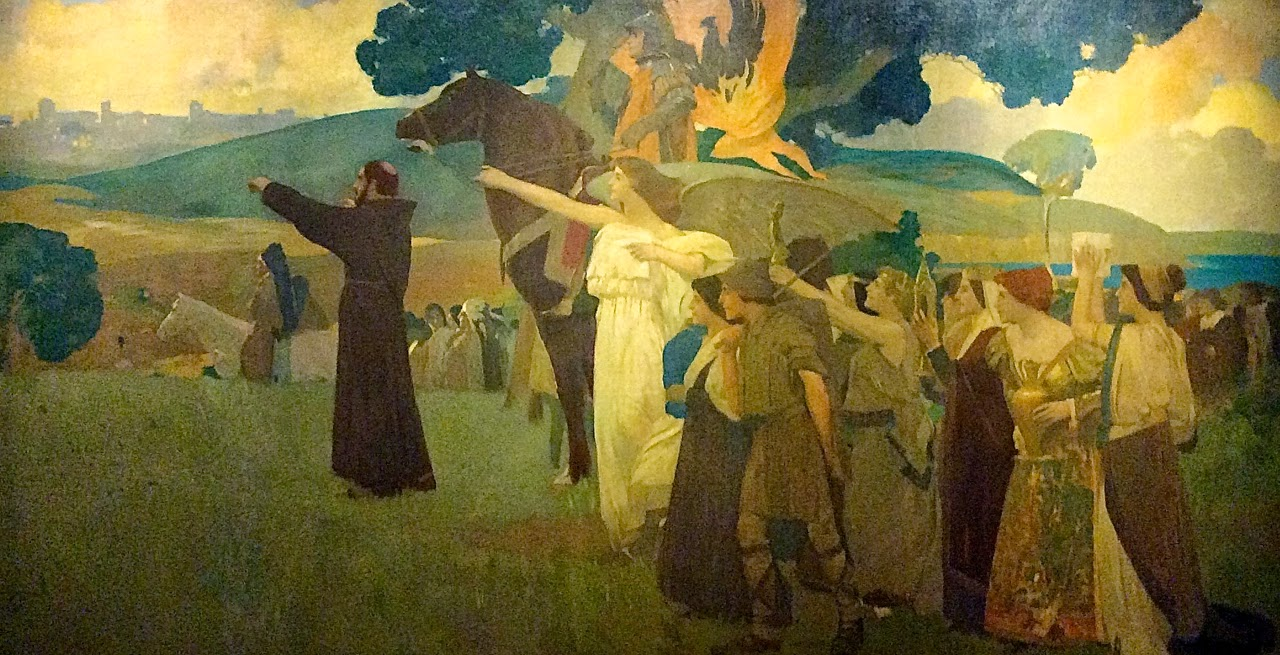
The Vision of Saint Francis

Afternoon Among the Cypress in the permanent collection of the New York Metropolitan Museum of Art is typical of Mathews' landscape paintings of the Monterey Peninsula. The Grape (The Wine Maker) at the M. H. de Young Memorial Museum of the Fine Arts Museums of San Francisco is one of his allegorical paintings representing early California. Youth at the Oakland Museum of California and Spring Dance at the Smithsonian American Art Museum are two of his many paintings of dancing female figures in semi-classical attire. His work is extensively represented in the Oakland Museum of California.

Mathews' work is in the following major museums:

- Crocker Art Museum, Sacramento, California
- Fine Arts Museums of San Francisco, M. H. de Young Memorial Museum
- Hirshhorn Museum and Sculpture Garden
- Los Angeles County Museum of Art
- New York Metropolitan Museum of Art
- Oakland Museum of California
- San Diego Museum of Art
- Smithsonian American Art Museum
