= Fry (surname) =

Fry is an English and Scottish surname which derived from the Old Norse frjó meaning 'seed'.

== People ==
=== A ===
- Abi Fry (born 1986), Scottish musician
- Adam Fry (born 1985), English footballer
- Adrian Fry (born 1969), British musician
- Alexander Fry (1821–1905), English entomologist
- Arthur Fry (born 1931), American inventor and scientist
- Arthur Fry (1861–1937), English footballer
- Autumn Fry (born 2012), American YouTuber

=== B ===
- Barbara Fry (1922–1997), British daffodil breeder and horticulturist
- Barry Fry (born 1945), English football manager
- Ben Fry (born 1975), American computer software expert and digital art designer
- Bertha Fry (1893–2007), American supercentenarian
- Beverly Jane Fry, Australian ballerina
- Bob Fry (1930–2019), American football player
- Birkett D. Fry (1822–1891), Confederate general in the American Civil War

=== C ===
- C. B. Fry (1872–1956), British sportsman, politician, writer, editor, and publisher
- Caroline Fry (1787–1846), British Christian writer
- Cecil Roderick Fry (1890–1952), English confectioner
- Chance Fry (born 1964), retired American soccer player
- Charles Fry (born 1940), British cricketer and cricket administrator, and grandson of C. B. Fry
- Charles M. Fry (1822–1892), American banker
- Charlotte Fry (born 1996), British equestrian athlete
- Chris Fry (footballer) (born 1969), Welsh footballer
- Christopher Fry (1907–2005), British playwright
- Colin Fry (1962–2015), English television show host
- Craig R. Fry (born 1952), American politician

=== D ===
- Dael Fry (born 1997), English footballer
- Daniel Fry (1908–1992), American 'alien contactee'
- David Fry (disambiguation)
- Don Fry, Australian engineer, entrepreneur and philanthropist
- Donald Fry (disambiguation)
- Doug Fry, Australian rugby league player
- Douglas Fry (1872–1911), Australian artist
- Douglas P. Fry (born 1953), American anthropologist
- Dustin Fry (born 1983), American football player

=== E ===
- Ed Fry (1879–1968), Australian rugby league and rugby union player
- Edmund Fry (1754–1835), English type-founder
- Edward Fry (1827–1918), British judge
- Elizabeth Fry (1780–1845), British prison reformer, social reformer and philanthropist
- Ella Fry (1916–1997), Australian artist and musician
- Elliott Fry (born 1994), American football player
- Emma Sheridan Fry (1864–1936), American actress, playwright and teacher
- Eric Fry (born 1987), American rugby union player
- F. E. J. Fry (Frederick Ernest Joseph Fry; 1908–1989), Canadian ecologist

=== F ===
- Franklin Clark Fry (1900–1968), American Lutheran clergyman
- Franklin Foster Fry, (1864−1933), American Lutheran minister
- Francis Fry (1803–1886), English businessman and bibliographer
- Fred Fry, Australian rugby league player

=== G ===
- Graham Fry (born 1949), British High Commissioner and politician

=== H ===
- Hannah Fry (born 1984), mathematician and broadcaster
- Harry Fry (racehorse trainer) (born 1986), British racehorse trainer
- Harry Fry (rower) (1905–1985), Canadian rower
- Hayden Fry (1929–2019), American football coach
- Hedy Fry (born 1941), Canadian politician and physician
- Henry Fry (disambiguation), multiple people
- Herbert Fry (1870–1953), Australian cricketer and Australian rules footballer

=== I ===
- Isaac N. Fry (1827–1900), American Civil War soldier awarded the Medal of Honor

=== J ===
- Jacob Fry Jr. (1802–1866), American politician
- James Barnet Fry (1827–1894), American soldier and author
- Janina Fry (born 1973), Finnish pop singer and model
- Jeremy Fry (1924–2005), British inventor and engineer
- Jerry Fry (born 1956), American baseball player
- Joan Mary Fry (1862–1955), British reformer
- John Fry (disambiguation)
- Johnson Fry (1901–1959), American baseball player
- Joe Fry (1915–1950), British racing driver
- Joseph Fry (disambiguation)
- Joshua Fry (1699–1754), English surveyor and adventurer

=== K ===
- Ken Fry (1920–2007), Australian politician

=== L ===
- Laura Anne Fry (1857–1943), American artist
- Lena Jane Fry (1850–1938), Canadian-American writer
- Leslie Fry (1882–1970), pen name of Paquita de Shishmareff, American antisemitic activist
- Lewis Fry (1832–1921), British Quaker, lawyer, philanthropist and politician
- Louis Edwin Fry Sr. (1903–2000), American architect and professor

=== M ===
- Mae Carroll Fry, American politician and schoolteacher
- Maia Krall Fry (born 1992), English actress and director
- Margery Fry (1874–1958), British prison reformer
- Mark Fry (born 1952), English painter and musician
- Martin Fry (born 1958), English singer
- Matthew Wyatt Joseph Fry (1863–1943), Irish mathematician and academic
- Matt Fry (born 1990), English footballer
- Maxwell Fry (1899–1987), English architect
- Michael Fry (cartoonist), American cartoonist, online media entrepreneur and screenwriter
- Mike L. Fry (born 1961), American entrepreneur, entertainer, trainer and marketing expert

=== N ===
- Nan Fry, American poet
- Nick Fry (born 1956), British motorsport executive
- Nina Fry, British actress
- Norah Fry (1871–1960), British social activist and politician

=== P ===
- Pat Fry (born 1964), English motor racing engineer
- Paul Fry (disambiguation)
- Peter Fry (1931–2015), British politician
- Plantagenet Somerset Fry (1931–1996), British historian and author

=== R ===
- Rebecca Fry, U.S. environmental health scientist and academic administrator
- Reginald C Fry (1878–1932), English architect
- Richard Fry (1924–2016), British army officer
- Robert Fry (disambiguation)
- Roger Fry (1866–1934), British artist and arts critic
- Roger Fry (educationist), British educationist
- Ron Scot Fry, American entertainment and artistic director
- Russell Fry (born 1985), American politician
- Russell Fry (footballer) (born 1985), English footballer
- Ruth Fry (1878–1962), British Quaker writer, pacifist and peace activist
- Ryan Fry (born 1978), Canadian curler

=== S ===
- Scott Fry, (born c. 1950), retired United States Navy vice admiral
- Sherry Edmundson Fry (1879–1966), American sculptor
- Shirley Fry (1927–2021), American tennis player
- Simon Fry (born 1966), Australian cricket umpire
- Speed S. Fry (1817–1892), American lawyer, judge and soldier
- Stephen Fry (disambiguation)
- Susan Fry, American author and editor
- Susanna M. D. Fry (1841–1920), American educator and activist

=== T ===
- Taylor Fry (born 1981), American actress
- Theodore Fry (1836–1912), English businessman and politician
- Tony Fry, design theorist and philosopher
- Tristan Fry (born 1946), British drummer and percussionist

=== V ===
- Varian Fry (1907–1967), American journalist who ran a rescue network in Vichy France

=== W ===
- Wesley Fry (1902–1970), American football executive
- William Fry (disambiguation)

== Fictional characters ==
- Harold Fry, protagonist of Rachel Joyce's novel The Unlikely Pilgrimage of Harold Fry
- Philip J. Fry, fictional protagonist of the animated television series Futurama

== See also ==
- Fry (disambiguation)
- Frey (surname)
- Fried (disambiguation)
- Frye
