= Vera Allison =

American jeweler and painter (1902–1993)

- Born: Vera A. Allison; December 5, 1902; San Francisco, California, U.S.
- Died: August 20, 1993 (aged 90); San Cristobal, New Mexico, U.S.
- Other name: Vera Gaethke
- Occupation: Visual artist
- Years active: 1920s, and c. 1930s–1980s
- Known for: Jeweler, painter
- Movement: Modernism
- Spouse: George Michael Gaethke (m. 1919–1982; death)
- Children: 1

Vera A. Allison (1902–1993) also known as Vera Gaethke, was an American Modernist jeweler, and abstract painter. She was a co-founder of the Metal Arts Guild of San Francisco, a non-profit, arts educational organization. Allison had lived in San Francisco, Berkeley, and Mill Valley in California; and in San Cristobal, New Mexico.

== Early life and education ==
Vera Allison was born December 5, 1902, in San Francisco. She attended University of California, Berkeley (U.C. Berkeley), where she received a B.A. degree in Art.

In 1929, she married painter and printmaker George Gaethke (1898–1982), and they had a child.

== Career ==
After graduation, she travelled in Europe and painted in oil and watercolor. When she returned to San Francisco, Allison worked as a commercial designer at Foster & Kleiser advertising company.

When she was returning to work after a period of maternity leave, Allison took adult education classes in jewelry and studied under Loyola Lawson Fourtane (1899–1976) of Sausalito. In 1951, Allison was one of the founding members of the Metal Arts Guild of San Francisco (MAG), a metal arts organization led by Margaret De Patta. Other founding members of MAG included Merry Renk, Irena Brynner, Florence Resnikoff, Byron August Wilson, Peter Macchiarini, Virginia Macchiarini, Francis Sperisen, and Bob Winston.

From 1967 to 1986, Allison lived in Mill Valley, Marin County, California, where she was an active member of the Marin Society of Artists.

She was part of the group exhibition, Jewelry by Peter Macchiarini, Vera Allison, and Irena Brynner (1952) at San Francisco Museum of Modern Art (SFMoMA). In 1962, Allison was part of an annual members group exhibition with the Society of San Francisco Women Artists (now San Francisco Women Artists) arts organizations at SFMoMA, where she won an award for her jewelry. In 1976, she served as a jury member for the 30th Annual Art Festival (1976) in Civic Center, San Francisco.

== End of life, death, and legacy ==
She remained active in the arts into the late 1970s. In 1986, Allison moved to New Mexico to live with her daughter. She died on August 20, 1993, in La Lama (now Lama Foundation) in San Cristobal, New Mexico at the age of 90.

Her artist files are located in the Smithsonian American Art and Portrait Gallery Library in Washington, D.C.

== Exhibitions ==
- 1947, Vera Allison and George Gaethke, Gump's gallery, San Francisco, California
- 1950, solo exhibition, Barry Lambert Gallery, Santa Rosa, California
- 1955, Jack London Square Art Festival, Oakland, California
- 1952, Jewelry by Peter Macchiarini, Vera Allison, and Irena Brynner, San Francisco Museum of Modern Art, San Francisco, California
- 1961, Contemporary Craftsmen of the Far West, Museum of Contemporary Crafts, New York City, New York
- 1962, Annual Exhibition of the Society of San Francisco Women Artists, San Francisco Museum of Modern Art, San Francisco, California
- 1966, The Art of Personal Adornment, the Museum West of the American Craftsman Council, San Francisco, California
