= Fries (disambiguation) =

French fries are strips of deep-fried potato commonly referred to as fries.

Fries may also refer to:

== Food ==
- Home fries, diced or sliced fried potatoes
- Lamb fries, lamb testicles eaten as food

== People ==
- Fries Deschilder (born 1992), Belgian footballer
- Fries (surname), including a list of people with the name

== Other uses ==
- Fries, Virginia
- Fries, a form of the verb "to fry": see frying
- Fries, a character from the second season of Battle for Dream Island, an animated web series
- Fast Rope Insertion Extraction System, or fast-roping, a technique for descending a thick rope
- Fries rearrangement, a chemical reaction
- Frisian languages (Dutch: Fries), languages spoken in Friesland (Netherlands) and East Friesland (Germany)
- Freely given, reversible, informed, enthusiastic, specific, a set of elements in sexual consent

== See also ==
- Fry (disambiguation)
- Fray (disambiguation)
- Frey (disambiguation)
- Fried (disambiguation)
- Frye
- Small Fry (disambiguation)
