= Frej (surname) =

Frej is a surname. Notable people with the surname include:

- Issawi Frej (born 1963), Israeli Arab politician
- Ladislav Frej (born 1941), Czech actor
- Robin Frej (born 1998), Swedish footballer
- Saber Ben Frej (born 1979), Tunisian footballer

== See also ==
- Fray (surname)
- Frei (surname)
- Frey (surname)
- Frej (disambiguation)
- Frej (given name)
