= Fry =

Fry or Fry's may refer to:

== People and fictional characters ==
- Fry (surname), including a list of people and fictional characters

== Businesses and organizations ==
- Fry (racing team), a British Formula Two constructor
- Fry Art Gallery, Saffron Walden, Essex, England
- Fry Group Foods, a South African/Australian manufacturer of vegan meat analogues
- Fry's Electronics, a defunct American retailer
- Fry's Food and Drug, a chain of American supermarkets in Arizona
- J. S. Fry & Sons, a defunct British chocolate manufacturer

== Science ==
- Fry (biology), a juvenile stage of aquatic animals
- Glottal or vocal fry, in phonetics, a low, croaky register of voicing
- West Frisian language, spoken in the Netherlands (ISO 639 code: fry)

== Places ==
=== Antarctica ===
- Fry Glacier, Victoria Land
- Fry Peak, Palmer Land

=== Europe ===
- Fry, Seine-Maritime, a commune in France
- Federal Republic of Yugoslavia (1992–2006)

=== North America ===
- Frys, Saskatchewan, a former locality in Canada
- Fry, West Virginia, an unincorporated community in the United States
- Fry Mountains, a mountain range in California, United States

=== Outer space ===
- 5190 Fry, an asteroid

== See also ==
- Fries (disambiguation)
- Frying
- Fri, Kasos
- Frye, a surname
- Fray (disambiguation)
- Frey (disambiguation)
- Fried (surname)
