= Tyler James Hoare =

- Born: 1940; Joplin, Missouri, US
- Died: January 31, 2023
- Education: University of Kansas, 1963
- Years active: 1970s–2020s
- Known for: Public art installations

Tyler James Hoare (1940 – January 31, 2023) was an American designer, artist, and sculptor. He was known for his public art installations around the San Francisco Bay Area, including the Emeryville mudflats.

== Early life and education ==
Hoare was born in Joplin, Missouri, in 1940. He first wanted to be an artist as a teenager, but felt it wasn't socially acceptable in his town. Instead, he focused on customizing cars, which would be a continued interest for him for decades. After visiting Greenwich Village in 1959, he decided to enroll in the University of Kansas, where he graduated with a bachelor’s degree in drawing and painting in 1963.

== Art ==
In 1965, Hoare, his wife Kathy, and their infant daughter moved to Berkeley, California, where he worked as a restaurant designer. He began installing his sculptures, many of them military biplanes, along the mudflats of the San Francisco Bay in the 1970s. The sculptures were made using driftwood and other debris, and were often installed on top of former pier posts, where they were visible from Interstate 80. Hoare embraced the ephemeral nature of his work, simply replacing or rebuilding when sculptures were damaged or stolen.

His most famous sculpture was of the Red Baron and his biplane. A photograph of that work against the San Francisco skyline was used by KQED Channel 9 for their station identification. Although most known for his planes, other subjects of his work included ships, UFOs, animals, and human figures. He also showed his work at the Compound Gallery in Emeryville.

== Exbitions ==
- Metal Arts (1974), Berkeley Art Center, Berkeley, California; group exhibition featuring artists: Imogene "Tex" Gieling, Robert R. Coleman, Florence Fullmer Dixon, Tyler James Hoare, C. Carl Jennings, Harriet Johns, Priscilla Kapel, Sandra Lesnewsky, Esther Lewittes, Arthur Lutz, Zella Eckels Marggraf, Richard A. Mayer, George D. McLean, Louis Mueller, E. J. Montgomery, John Nugent, Dalene M. Osterkamp, George Postgate, Merry Renk, Florence Resnikoff, Phyllis H. Smith, Eve Paige Spencer, Naomi Stahl, Martin K. Weber, Anne Wienholt, and Byron August Wilson
