= Gerhard Frey =

Gerhard Frey may refer to:

- Gerhard Frey (mathematician) (born 1944), German mathematician
- Gerhard Frey (politician), (1933–2013) German politician for the Deutsche Volksunion (DVU)

== See also ==
- All pages with titles containing "Gerhard" and "Frey"
- Gerhard (name)
- Frey (surname)
- Gerhard (disambiguation)
- Frey (disambiguation)
