= Metal Arts Guild of San Francisco =

American non-profit, arts educational organization

- Abbreviation: MAG
- Formation: 1951; 75 years ago
- Type: 501(c 3) non-profit arts organization
- Headquarters: San Francisco, California, United States
- Website: www.metalartsguildsf.org
- Formerly called: Metal Arts Guild of Northern California

Metal Arts Guild of San Francisco (MAG), is an American non-profit, arts educational organization founded in 1951. The organization has supported the creation of Modernist jewelry in the San Francisco Bay Area, as well as contemporary, and sculptural works.

== History ==
The Metal Arts Guild of San Francisco was founded in July 1951 by a group of dedicated metal artists and jewelers led by Margaret De Patta, and included Merry Renk, Irena Brynner, Florence Resnikoff, Byron August Wilson, Peter Macchiarini, Virginia Macchiarini, Vera Allison, Francis Sperisen, and Bob Winston. Margaret De Patta served as the MAG founding president in 1951; followed by Merry Renk serving as president in 1954.

The organization has been run by a team of volunteers since the early times. The members meet once a month for organizational meetings. The organization host educational lectures, art exhibitions, and classes. Benefits for members of MAG include a mutual exchange of information on techniques and exhibition opportunities, and large cooperative purchases of materials in order to offer a lessened prices.

For many of the early years of the organization, an annual exhibition of the Metal Arts Guild was held at a San Francisco museum, often at the Legion of Honor, or the De Young Museum. In 2002, the exhibition Fifty Years in the Making: The Bay Area Metal Arts Guild 1951-2001, was held at Velvet Da Vinci gallery in San Francisco.

== Notable former members ==
- Vera Allison
- Margery Anneberg
- Marian Bassett
- Irena Brynner
- Margaret De Patta
- Harry Dixon
- Susie Ganch
- Imogene Gieling
- Dorothy Green (jeweler)
- Connie Grothkopp
- John Ihle
- Afton Lewis
- Thomas Little
- Peter Macchiarini
- Virginia Macchiarini
- Jack Nutting
- Robert Pearl
- Margaret Randolph
- Merry Renk
- Florence Resnikoff
- Muriel Savin
- Francis Spensen
- Byron August Wilson
- Sally Wilson
- Bob Winston

== See also ==
- Art jewelry
- Jewellery
