= Frey (disambiguation) =

Frey, Freij, Freyr or Freÿr may refer to:

== People, figures, characters ==
- Freyr, a fertility god in Norse mythology
  - Freyr (Stargate), a fictional character in Stargate SG-1, based on this god
- Frey (given name)
- Frey (surname)

== Places ==
=== Belgium ===
- Castle of Freÿr, a castle in Belgium

=== United States ===
- Frey, Michiganl; a community in Reeder Township, Missaukee County
- Freys Hill, Louisville, Kentucky; a neighborhood

== Other uses ==
- Frey (chocolate), a Swiss manufacturer of chocolate since 1887
- Frey's procedure, a treatment for chronic pancreatitis
- Frey's syndrome, a food-related condition

== See also ==
- Oulad Frej, a small town and rural commune in El Jadida Province of the Casablanca-Settat region of Morocco
- Frey Party, a nickname for the German People's Union, a political party in Germany
- Frey effect from microwaves
- Frey curve, an elliptic curve
- Frei (disambiguation)
- Frej (disambiguation)
- Freyja (disambiguation)
- Fray (disambiguation)
- Freya (disambiguation)
- Fry (disambiguation)
- Frye
