= Merry Renk =

American jewelry designer (1921-2012)

- Merry Renk, Jeweler, 1953 by Imogen Cunningham
- Born: Mary Ruth Gibbs; July 8, 1921; Trenton, New Jersey, U.S.
- Died: June 17, 2012 (aged 90); San Francisco, California, U.S.
- Other names: Merry Renk-Curtis
- Education: IIT Institute of Design
- Spouse(s): Stanley Edwin Renk (m.1941–1945, death); Earle Watt Curtis (m.1958–2008, death)
- Children: 2

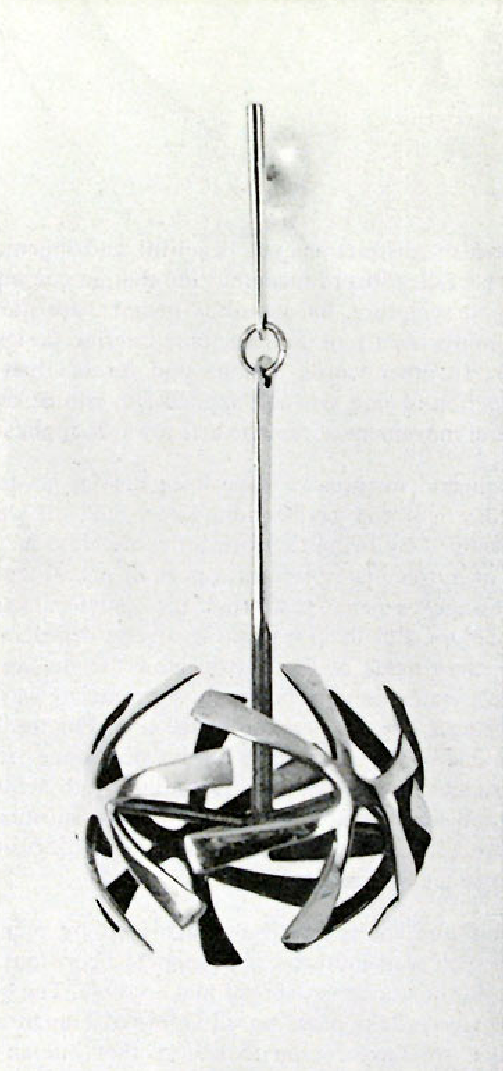
Gold spherical earring by Merry Renk

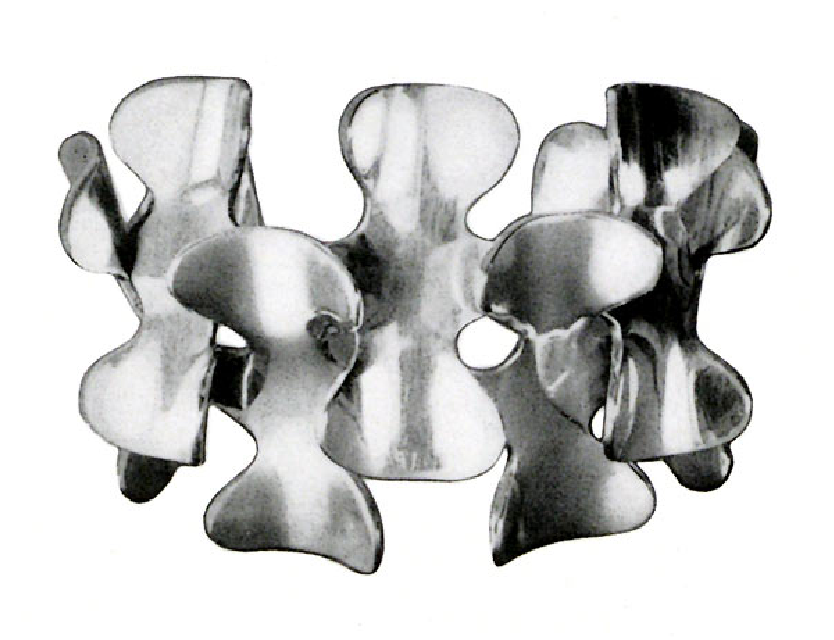
Gold bracelet of interlocking forms by Merry Renk

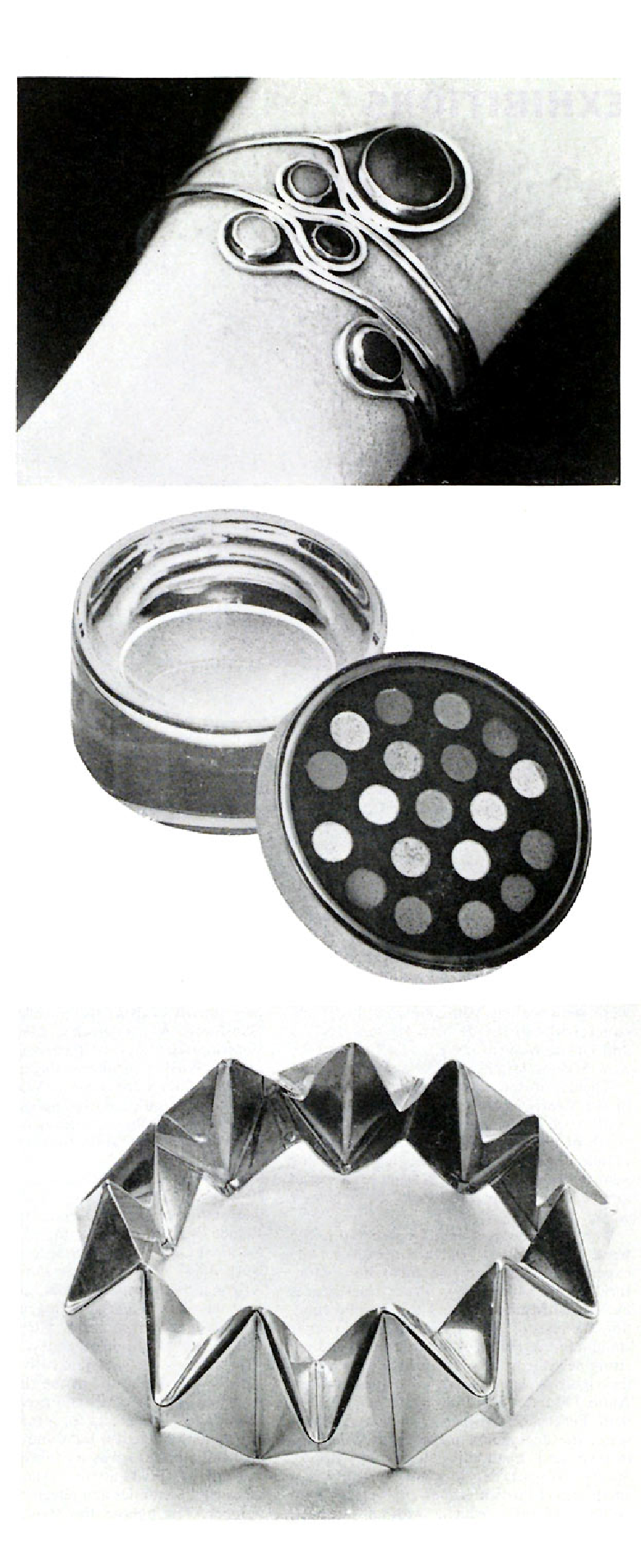
Silver bracelet set with shore pebbles; silver and gold unguent box with cut quartz set into plique-à-jour enamel lid; tiara forged from single strip of silver. by Merry Renk

External media

Audio
- "Merry Renk discusses Margaret De Patta. Interview by emiko oye", April 15, 2012.

Video
- Crowns by Merry Renk, 2008
- Forrest L. Merrill on Merry Renk

Merry Renk (born Mary Ruth Gibbs; July 8, 1921 – June 17, 2012), also known as Merry Renk-Curtis, was an American jewelry designer, metalsmith, sculptor and painter. In 1951, she helped to found the Metal Arts Guild of San Francisco (MAG), and served as its president in 1954.

== Biography ==
Mary Ruth Gibbs was born on July 8, 1921, in Trenton, New Jersey.

From 1939 until 1941, she attended the Trenton School of Industrial Arts to study painting. In 1946, she moved to Chicago and enrolled in the IIT Institute of Design, studying industrial design. Between 1947 and 1948, Renk co-founded 750 Studio at 750 N. Dearborn Street in Chicago with Olive Oliver and Mary Jo Slick. They lived in the back of the building, which they renovated.

750 Studio is credited as "the first contemporary arts and crafts gallery in America to show abstract art". The gallery showed works by well-known artists including Henry Miller, László Moholy-Nagy, Harry Callahan, and Margaret De Patta. During this time Renk became interested in enamels on metal and began working in metals; she was largely self-taught as a jeweler.

In 1948, Renk traveled to Europe and eventually settled in San Francisco. Renk started creating organic forms in her jewelry and they grew in popularity. In 1950 she went to Paris, and to Spain and Morocco with Lenore Tawney, returning to San Francisco in 1951.

Then and later, she commemorated events that she found important, such as a meeting with Constantin Brâncuși in 1951, in "Memory" paintings incorporating both words and images.

Invited by Margaret de Patta, Renk became a founding member of the Metal Arts Guild of San Francisco (MAG) in 1951. MAG was the first organization in the United States to address the needs of studio jewelers.

Other founding members included Vera Allison, Irena Brynner, Margaret de Patta, Florence Resnikoff, Francis Spensen, Byron August Wilson, Bob Winston, Peter Macchiarini, and Virginia Macchiarini. In 1954, Renk served as President of the Metal Arts Guild. She remained active in the group until age 90.

I wouldn't have given up my time at my workbench to anyone. I enjoyed the whole process: using the saw to take my designs from paper to metal, seeing the beauty of the torch as it fuses one piece of metal to another, and focusing on the intimate details, like small gems. What a treasure it has been to make my living as a goldsmith. – Merry Renk

Around the mid-1950s Renk began creating intricate tiaras and crowns. In 1969, she was one of 250 artists invited to participate in the national touring exhibition Objects: USA sponsored by S. C. Johnson & Son. Renk created a wedding crown of interlocking gold petals and 240 pearls, White Cloud. It was one of her largest ornamental objects, and brought her international recognition.

"After the functional aspect ... the object itself must have a feeling of rightness. There must be a kind of intensity to it." – Merry Renk

Either in the 1960s or in a car accident in 1974, Renk sustained an eye injury. For a time she turned to creating large-scale metal sculptures, applying many of the interlocking techniques she used in her jewelry. In 1982, at the age of 60, she decided to return to painting. In 1994, Renk was elected a fellow at the American Craft Council (ACC).

== Awards ==
- 1960, purchase award, San Francisco Arts Festival
- 1961, merit award, San Francisco Arts Festival
- 1974, NEA Fellowship, National Endowment for the Arts
- 1986, Distinguished Work and Achievement in Crafts Award, City and County of San Francisco
- 1994, Fellow, American Craft Council
- Distinguished Member of the Society of North American Goldsmiths

== Legacy ==
Renk's work is in many public museum collections including the Renwick Gallery, the Oakland Museum of California, and the Museum of Fine Arts, Boston, among others.

In 1981, the California Crafts Museum featured her in its retrospective exhibition Merry Renk, Jeweler: A Visual Biography and Retrospective, 1947-1981.

In 2011, her jewelry was featured by the Los Angeles County Museum of Art (LACMA), along with that of Peter Macchiarini, in the exhibition, California Design 1930-1965: Living in the Modern Way. The exhibitions Pacific Standard Time: Art in Los Angeles, 1945-1980 (2011-2012) at the Los Angeles County Museum of Art, and Crafting Modernism: Mid-century American Art and Design (2011) at the Museum of Arts and Design, also feature her with other MAG artists.

== Personal life ==
In 1941, Mary Ruth Gibbs married Stanley Edwin Renk. Her first husband Stanley died in 1945 during World War II. In 1958, she married potter Earle Watt Curtis, with whom she had two daughters. Earle Watt Curtis died on October 30, 2008. Merry Renk died on June 17, 2012, in San Francisco of congestive heart failure.

== Archives ==
- Merry Renk papers, 1952-2000, Archives of American Art, Smithsonian Institution, Washington, D.C.
- Oral history interview with Merry Renk, 2001 January 18-19, Archives of American Art, Smithsonian Institution.
- Interview with Merry Renk, 2012 April 28, Archives of American Art, Smithsonian Institution.
