= Imogene Gieling =

American metalsmith, educator (1923–2024)

- Born: Imogene Bailey Frey; 1923; Corsicana, Texas, U.S.
- Died: December 22, 2024 (aged 100–101)
- Other names: Imogene Bailey; Tex Bailey; Tex Gieling
- Education: Texas Woman's University, University of Washington
- Occupations: Metalsmith, jewelry designer, educator.
- Spouse: John Gieling (m. 1954)

Imogene Bailey "Tex" Gieling (née Imogene Bailey Frey; 1923 – December 22, 2024) was an American metalsmith, jewelry designer, and educator. She was a founding member of the Metal Arts Guild of San Francisco; and was a professor emeritus at San Francisco State University.

== Early life and education ==
Imogene Gieling was born as Imogene Bailey Frey in 1923, in Corsicana, Texas. Her father encouraged her appreciation of art in her childhood.

Gieling graduated from Texas Woman's University in Denton, Texas, and with a Master's degree from the University of Washington in Seattle. Additionally she studied in the 1950s metal arts under Victor Reis (1907–2006) in the San Francisco Bay Area.

== Career and late life ==
The nickname Tex was given to her in 1947, when she worked at The Bon Marché department store in Seattle as student. Gieling started exhibiting her work internationally in 1954. In the summer of 1954, she married John Gieling.

Gieling taught in the decorative arts department at the University of California, Berkeley (UC Berkeley) from 1955 until 1962; followed by teaching and founding of the metals department at the San Francisco State University (SFSU) from 1965 until 1990. She was a professor emeritus at SFSU.

From 1967 until 2024, Gieling and her husband John owned the house at 22 Beaver Street in the Duboce Triangle neighborhood of San Francisco, now known as the Benedict–Gieling House (built c. 1879) and listed as a San Francisco Historical Landmark since 2018.

Gieling was awarded the Society of North American Goldsmiths' Lifetime Achievement Award in 2003. Gieling had a retrospective exhibition in 2018 to 2019, Tex Gieling: Sixty Years, held at the Museum of Craft and Design in San Francisco.

She died on December 22, 2024.

== Exhibitions ==
=== Solo exhibitions ===
- 1961, Imogene Bailey Gieling: Silver, Its Appearance and Disappearance – Design Traditions and Innovations in Contemporary Silver, San Francisco Museum of Modern Art (SFMoMA), San Francisco, California
- 2018–2019, Tex Gieling: Sixty Years, Museum of Craft and Design, San Francisco, California

=== Group exhibitions ===
- 5th Annual Exhibition of Watercolors, Prints, and Decorative Arts (1956), Richmond Art Center, Richmond, California; juried group exhibition
- 17 Craftsmen (1965), Museum West of the American Craftsmen's Council, Ghirardelli Square in San Francisco, California; group exhibition featuring artists: Imogene "Tex" Gieling, Janice Bornt, Lillian Elliott, Katherine Westphal, Dominic Di Mare, and Gary Oberbillig
- Metal Arts (1974), Berkeley Art Center, Berkeley, California; group exhibition featuring artists: Robert R. Coleman, Florence Fullmer Dixon, Imogene "Tex" Gieling, Tyler James Hoare, C. Carl Jennings, Harriet Johns, Priscilla Kapel, Sandra Lesnewsky, Esther Lewittes, Arthur Lutz, Zella Eckels Marggraf, Richard A. Mayer, George D. McLean, Louis Mueller, E. J. Montgomery, John Nugent, Dalene M. Osterkamp, George Postgate, Merry Renk, Florence Resnikoff, Phyllis H. Smith, Eve Paige Spencer, Naomi Stahl, Martin K. Weber, Anne Wienholt, and Byron August Wilson
