= Irena Brynner =

Jewellery designer (1917–2003)

- Born: December 1, 1917; Vladivostok, Primorsky Krai, Russia
- Died: January 26, 2003 (aged 85); New York City, New York, U.S.
- Other names: Irene Bryner
- Education: Lausanne Cantonale Art School, California Labor School, California College of the Arts, College of Marin
- Relatives: Yul Brynner (cousin)

Irena F. Brynner, also known as Irene Bryner (December 1, 1917 – January 26, 2003), was a Russian-born American sculptor, jewelry designer, mezzo-soprano singer, and author.

== Early life ==
Irena Brynner was born on December 1, 1917, in Vladivostok in Primorsky Krai, Russia. An only child, she lived there until she was 11 years old, in a two-family household under one roof in a Manchuria-based Russian naval base. In addition to her parents, the home was shared with her aunt and uncle, each a sibling of her respective parents, who were married to each other, and her double cousins, future actor Yul Brynner and his sister, Vera. She studied art at the Lausanne Cantonale Art School (École cantonale d'art de Lausanne) in Lausanne, Switzerland. She had lived in Dairen (now Dalian) and Peking (now Beijing), China.

Her father had worked as a Swiss consul in China, and after he died in 1942, the Japanese government denounced him as a spy working for other governments. As a result, she and her mother fled and eventually landed in San Francisco, California, in 1946.

== Career ==
In San Francisco, she studied with Ralph Stackpole and Michael von Meyer, who exposed Brynner to Modernism and abstract art. Brynner attended the California Labor School (CLS), and studied ceramics and drawing. While attending the CLS, she was inspired by the works of Claire Falkenstein.

She apprenticed to study jewelry under Caroline Gleick Rosene (1907–1965) and Franz Walter Bergmann (1898–1977). In January 1950, she took classes with Bob Winston at the California College of the Arts (CCA) where she learned about wax working and she set up a jewelry studio. Her early jewelry work started very geometric, and changed to more organic forms in later years. Brynner co-founded the Metal Arts Guild in San Francisco in 1951, alongside Rosene, Winston, Vera Allison, Florence Resnikoff, Margaret de Patta, Merry Renk, and Byron Wilson, among others. In 1952, Brynner learned about silversmithing, forging and lost-wax casting at the College of Marin.

In 1957, Brynner traveled to New York City for an exhibition, and she decided to move shortly after. In New York, they did not allow her to use an oxygen fuel for her torch, so her work changed direction, and she started working in wax casting. Her career was at its peak between 1958 and 1964, and she held many international exhibitions. In 1963, she received the gold medal, Bavarian State Prize from the International Handicrafts Fair in Munich, Germany.

Brynner participated in the HemisFair '68 in the Woman's Pavilion, alongside Bolivian artist Marina Nuñez del Prado and Argentinian fashion photographer Maria Martel. In 1969, another major change in her work occurred when she started using the Henes Water Welder for electric soldering which was closer to lost-wax casting techniques.

In 1999, she was named a fellow by the American Craft Council.

She died on January 26, 2003, in New York City, aged 85.

== Publications ==
- Brynner, Irena (2003). What I Remember. Authorhouse. ISBN 9781403375162.
- Brynner, Irena (1979). Jewelry As An Art Form. Van Nostrand Reinhold. ISBN 978-0442261146.
- Brynner, Irena (1968). Modern Jewelry, Design and Techniques. Reinhold Book Corporation. ISBN 978-0442211417.
