= 2017 BWF World Senior Championships – 40+ =

Tournament details
- Dates: 11 September 2017 – 17 September 2017
- Edition: 9
- Level: International
- Nations: 24
- Venue: Rajiv Gandhi Indoor Stadium
- Location: Kochi, India

Champions
- Men's singles: (Japan) Hosemari Fujimoto
- Women's singles: (Germany) Claudia Vogelgsang
- Men's doubles: (Thailand) Phongthep Imkaew (Thailand) Worapoj Somchariya
- Women's doubles: (England) Louise Culyer (Denmark) Dorte Steenberg
- Mixed doubles: (Denmark) Carsten Loesch (Denmark) Dorte Steenberg

These are the results of 2017 BWF World Senior Championships' 40+ events.

== Men's singles ==
=== Seeds ===
1. (Denmark) Lars Klintrup (second round)
2. (India) Joy T. Antony (semifinals, bronze medal)
3. (Japan) Hosemari Fujimoto (champion, gold medal)
4. (England) Carl Jennings (quarterfinals)
5. (Chinese Taipei) Huang Chia-lung (first round)
6. (Thailand) Thaweesak Koetsriphan (quarterfinals)
7. (Belgium) Yu Hin Siu (first round)
8. (Denmark) Morten Aarup (second round)

=== Finals ===
Semifinals
(India) C. M. Shashidhar	9	14
3	(Japan) Hosemari Fujimoto	21	21
(India) K. A. Aneesh	21	21
2	(India) Joy T. Antony	16	15

Final
3	(Japan) Hosemari Fujimoto	21	21
(India) K. A. Aneesh	4	9

=== Top half ===
==== Section 1 ====
First Round
1	(Denmark) L Klintrup	21	21
(England) M Trebble	7	7
(Norway) V Næss	5	4
(India) C. M. Shashidhar	21	21
6	(Thailand) T Koetsriphan	21	21
(Russia) D Ilin	10	8
(Sri Lanka) J Mihindasiri	21	11	19
(France) C Jallamion	17	21	21

Second Round
1	(Denmark) L Klintrup	8	11
(India) C. M. Shashidhar	21	21
6	(Thailand) T Koetsriphan	21	21
(France) C Jallamion	16	3

Quarterfinals
(India) C. M. Shashidhar	21	21
6	(Thailand) T Koetsriphan	10	12

==== Section 2 ====
First Round
3	(Japan) H Fujimoto	21	21
(India) S Abbasi	9	11
(Bahrain) J Mottil	13	21	4^{r}
(Sweden) M Tornemo	21	12	6
7	(Belgium) Y H Siu	13	6
(Sri Lanka) M S Fernando	21	21
(Brunei) Won S K	21	21
(Indonesia) A K Cavale	17	10

Second Round
3	(Japan) H Fujimoto	21	21
(Sweden) M Tornemo	5	7
(Sri Lanka) M S Fernando	7	22	15
(Brunei) Won S K	21'	20	21

Quarterfinals
3	(Japan) H Fujimoto	21	21
(Brunei) Won S K	6	11

=== Bottom half ===
==== Section 3 ====
First Round
(Indonesia) K C Tjendar	19	12
(India) K. A. Aneesh	21	21
(Sweden) D Jansson	11	8
8	(Denmark) M Aarup	21	21
(Sri Lanka) N Jayamanne	w	/	o
(Malaysia) Teh S K
(France) S Coustaud	9	9
4	(England) C Jennings	21	21

Second Round
(India) K. A. Aneesh	21	21
8	(Denmark) M Aarup	19	16
(Sri Lanka) N Jayamanne	6	11
4	(England) C Jennings	21	21

Quarterfinals
(India) K. A. Aneesh	24	21
4	(England) C Jennings	22	15

==== Section 4 ====
First Round
(Czech Republic) J Port	21	21
(Germany) M Anhäuser	15	10
(Japan) T Yamamoto	21	21
5	(Chinese Taipei) Huang C-l	11	8
(Belgium) J Van den Brande	15	21	21
(Sweden) P Roos	21	17	17
(Sri Lanka) S Attanayake	6	4
2	(India) J T. Antony	21	21

Second Round
(Czech Republic) J Port	20	12
(Japan) T Yamamoto	22	21
(Belgium) J Van den Brande	4	8
2	(India) J T. Antony	21	21

Quarterfinals
(Japan) T Yamamoto	18	12
2	(India) J T. Antony	21	21

== Women's singles ==
=== Seeds ===
1. (England) Rebecca Pantaney (semifinals, bronze medal)
2. (Germany) Claudia Vogelgsang (champion, gold medal)

=== Group A ===
Rank	Player	Pts	Pld	W	L	SF	SA	PF	PA
1	(England) Rebecca Pantaney	2	2	2	0	4	0	85	55
2	(Uzbekistan) Yana Katerinich	1	2	1	1	2	2	66	75
3	(India) Purva Sangani	0	2	0	2	0	4	66	87

Date		Score		Set 1	Set 2	Set 3
11 Sep; 17:00	Rebecca Pantaney (England)	2–0	(Uzbekistan) Yana Katerinich	21–9	21–13	
12 Sep; 19:00	Purva Sangani (India)	0–2	(Uzbekistan) Yana Katerinich	21–23	12–21	
13 Sep; 16:10	Rebecca Pantaney (England)	2–0	(India) Purva Sangani	21–13	22–20	

=== Group B ===
Rank	Player	Pts	Pld	W	L	SF	SA	PF	PA
1	(Sri Lanka) Chandrika de Silva	3	3	3	0	6	0	126	41
2	(Spain) Maria Jesus Almagro	2	3	2	1	4	2	103	73
3	(India) Anamika Durgpurohit	1	3	1	2	2	4	70	116
4	(Sweden) Marie Svedell	0	3	0	3	0	6	57	126

Date		Score		Set 1	Set 2	Set 3
11 Sep; 17:00	Maria Jesus Almagro (Spain)	2–0	(Sweden) Marie Svedell	21–8	21–8	
11 Sep; 17:00	Anamika Durgpurohit (India)	0–2	(Sri Lanka) Chandrika de Silva	4–21	9–21	
12 Sep; 19:00	Anamika Durgpurohit (India)	2–0	(Sweden) Marie Svedell	21–13	21–19	
12 Sep; 19:00	Maria Jesus Almagro (Spain)	0–2	(Sri Lanka) Chandrika de Silva	9–21	10–21	
13 Sep; 16:10	Anamika Durgpurohit (India)	0–2	(Spain) Maria Jesus Almagro	11–21	4–21	
13 Sep; 16:10	Marie Svedell (Sweden)	0–2	(Sri Lanka) Chandrika de Silva	3–21	6–21	

=== Group C ===
Rank	Player	Pts	Pld	W	L	SF	SA	PF	PA
1	(France) Claire Villoin	3	3	3	0	6	1	141	90
2	(Indonesia) Elisabeth Tjandra	2	3	2	1	5	2	140	107
3	(India) Anu Gera	1	3	1	2	2	4	86	108
4	(Norway) Anja Olsen	0	3	0	3	0	6	64	126

Date		Score		Set 1	Set 2	Set 3
11 Sep; 17:30	Elisabeth Tjandra (Indonesia)	1–2	(France) Claire Villoin	23–25	21–11	12–21
11 Sep; 17:30	Anu Gera (India)	2–0	(Norway) Anja Olsen	21–14	21–10	
12 Sep; 19:00	Anu Gera (India)	0–2	(France) Claire Villoin	13–21	5–21	
12 Sep; 19:00	Elisabeth Tjandra (Indonesia)	2–0	(Norway) Anja Olsen	21–15	21–9	
13 Sep; 16:10	Claire Villoin (France)	2–0	(Norway) Anja Olsen	21–7	21–9	
13 Sep; 16:45	Anu Gera (India)	0–2	(Indonesia) Elisabeth Tjandra	12–21	14–21	

=== Group D ===
Rank	Player	Pts	Pld	W	L	SF	SA	PF	PA
1	(Germany) Claudia Vogelgsang	2	2	2	0	4	0	84	41
2	(India) Nancy Tandon	1	2	1	1	2	3	81	93
3	(Austria) Sigrun Fenkart-Ploner	0	2	0	2	1	4	74	105
	(England) Lynne Swan	Withdrew							

Date		Score		Set 1	Set 2	Set 3
11 Sep; 17:30	Claudia Vogelgsang (Germany)	2–0	(Austria) Sigrun Fenkart-Ploner	21–14	21–9	
12 Sep; 19:00	Nancy Tandon (India)	2–1	(Austria) Sigrun Fenkart-Ploner	21–23	21–18	21–10
13 Sep; 16:10	Claudia Vogelgsang (Germany)	2–0	(India) Nancy Tandon	21–9	21–9	

=== Finals ===
Quarterfinals
A1	(England) Rebecca Pantaney	21	21
D2	(India) Nancy Tandon	14	12
B1	(Sri Lanka) Chandrika de Silva	21	21
C2	(Indonesia) Elisabeth Tjandra	4	15
A2	(Uzbekistan) Yana Katerinich	21	21
C1	(France) Claire Villoin	17	16
B2	(Spain) Maria Jesus Almagro	17	5
D1	(Germany) Claudia Vogelgsang	21	21

Semifinals
A1	(England) Rebecca Pantaney
B1	(Sri Lanka) Chandrika de Silva	w	/	o
A2	(Uzbekistan) Yana Katerinich	10	7
D1	(Germany) Claudia Vogelgsang	21	21

Final
B1	(Sri Lanka) Chandrika de Silva	21	10	14
D1	(Germany) Claudia Vogelgsang	16	21	21

== Men's doubles ==
=== Seeds ===
1. (Denmark) Morten Aarup / Carsten Loesch (quarterfinals)
2. (England) Carl Jennings / Mark Trebble (quarterfinals)
3. (Sri Lanka) Manjula Sampath Fernando / Nishantha Dayan de Silva Jayasinghe (second round)
4. (Thailand) Supalerk Jantarapisal / Thaweesak Koetsriphan (second round)

=== Finals ===
Semifinals
(India) Jaseel P. Ismail (India) Jaison Xavier	18	14
(Thailand) Phongthep Imkaew (Thailand) Worapoj Somchariya	21	21
(Malaysia) Kah Kok Cheong (Malaysia) Lum Chee Meng	18	21	21
(India) Deepak Amarnath (India) Ajit Wijetlak	21	14	14

Final
(Thailand) Phongthep Imkaew (Thailand) Worapoj Somchariya	22	21
(Malaysia) Kah Kok Cheong (Malaysia) Lum Chee Meng	20	16

=== Top half ===
==== Section 1 ====
First Round
(Sri Lanka) N Amarasena (Sri Lanka) J Mihindasiri	12	8
(Belgium) Y H Siu (Belgium) J van Den Brande	21	21

Second Round
1	(Denmark) M Aarup (Denmark) C Loesch	15	23	21
(Indonesia) C D Arippin (Indonesia) K C Tjendar	21	21	11
(India) J P. Ismail (India) J Xavier	21	21
(Belgium) Y H Siu (Belgium) J van Den Brande	9	10

Quarterfinals
1	(Denmark) M Aarup (Denmark) C Loesch	17	13
(India) J P. Ismail (India) J Xavier	21	21

==== Section 2 ====
First Round
(Bangladesh) M R Kabir (Bangladesh) M K I Shikder	14	21	7
(India) S Kumar (India) V Kumar	21	19	21
(Norway) T Jacobsen (Norway) V Næss	4	14
(Thailand) P Imkaew (Thailand) W Somchariya	21	21

Second Round
3	(Sri Lanka) M S Fernando (Sri Lanka) N D d S Jayasinghe	10	9
(India) S Kumar (India) V Kumar	21	21
(Malaysia) Hong H H (Malaysia) Teh S K
(Thailand) P Imkaew (Thailand) W Somchariya	w	/	o

Quarterfinals
(India) S Kumar (India) V Kumar	12	11
(Thailand) P Imkaew (Thailand) W Somchariya	21	21

=== Bottom half ===
==== Section 3 ====
First Round
(Czech Republic) L Oroš (Czech Republic) J Port	21	15	16
(Singapore) A K Cavale (Russia) D Ilin	15	21	21
(India) A Haridas (India) K. A. Aneesh	22	17	14
(Malaysia) Kah K C (Malaysia) Lum C M	20	21	21

Second Round
(Singapore) A K Cavale (Russia) D Ilin	21	21
(Sri Lanka) S Attanayake (Sri Lanka) A Jayantha	10	11
(Malaysia) Kah K C (Malaysia) Lum C M	22	21
4	(Thailand) S Jantarapisal (Thailand) T Koetsriphan	20	19

Quarterfinals
(Singapore) A K Cavale (Russia) D Ilin	15	7
(Malaysia) Kah K C (Malaysia) Lum C M	21	21

==== Section 4 ====
First Round
(Sri Lanka) N Delpchitra Achrige (Sri Lanka) N Jayamanne	11	9
(India) D Amarnath (India) A Wijetlak	21	21

Second Round
(India) D Amarnath (India) A Wijetlak	21	21
(Sweden) D Janssen (Sweden) P Roos	9	15
(France) S Andres (France) S Coustaud	13	11
2	(England) C Jennings (England) M Trebble	21	21

Quarterfinals
(India) D Amarnath (India) A Wijetlak	11	21	21
2	(England) C Jennings (England) M Trebble	21	17	16

== Women's doubles ==
=== Seeds ===
1. (England) Rebecca Pantaney / Lynne Swan (semifinals, bronze medal)
2. (England) Louise Culyer / (Denmark) Dorte Steenberg (champions, gold medal)

=== Group A ===
Rank	Player	Pts	Pld	W	L	SF	SA	PF	PA
1	(England) Rebecca Pantaney (England) Lynne Swan	2	2	2	0	4	0	84	41
2	(Spain) Maria Jesus Almagro (Sweden) Pawarisa Wareechol	1	2	1	1	2	2	68	67
3	(India) Suchitra Misra (India) Nitika Thakur	0	2	0	2	0	4	40	84

Date		Score		Set 1	Set 2	Set 3
11 Sep; 12:00	Rebecca Pantaney (England); Lynne Swan (England)	2–0	(Spain) Maria Jesus Almagro (Sweden) Pawarisa Wareechol	21–15	21–11	
12 Sep; 13:00	Suchitra Misra (India); Nitika Thakur (India)	0–2	(Spain) Maria Jesus Almagro (Sweden) Pawarisa Wareechol	18–21	7–21	
13 Sep; 11:45	Rebecca Pantaney (England); Lynne Swan (England)	2–0	(India) Suchitra Misra (India) Nitika Thakur	21–7	21–8	

=== Group B ===
Rank	Player	Pts	Pld	W	L	SF	SA	PF	PA
1	(England) Olga Bryant (Russia) Olga Kuznetsova	2	2	2	0	4	0	84	55
2	(India) Supriya Devgun (India) Nancy Tandon	1	2	1	1	2	2	77	66
3	(Norway) Anja Olsen (Sweden) Marie Svedell	0	2	0	2	0	4	44	84

Date		Score		Set 1	Set 2	Set 3
11 Sep; 14:00	Supriya Devgun (India); Nancy Tandon (India)	0–2	(England) Olga Bryant (Russia) Olga Kuznetsova	16–21	19–21	
12 Sep; 14:00	Anja Olsen (Norway); Marie Svedell (Sweden)	0–2	(England) Olga Bryant (Russia) Olga Kuznetsova	11–21	9–21	
13 Sep; 11:45	Supriya Devgun (India); Nancy Tandon (India)	2–0	(Norway) Anja Olsen (Sweden) Marie Svedell	21–11	21–13	

=== Group C ===
Rank	Player	Pts	Pld	W	L	SF	SA	PF	PA
1	(South Korea) Han Hye-jeong (Indonesia) Elisabeth Tjandra	3	3	3	0	6	1	145	97
2	(Japan) Shizuko Sasaki (Japan) Ayumi Takakura	2	3	2	1	5	2	138	90
3	(India) Sreedevi Gadhili (India) Ruchita Sharma	1	3	1	2	2	4	79	114
4	(France) Caroline Lefèvre (Sweden) Anne-Marie Wellendorph	0	3	0	3	0	6	65	126

Date		Score		Set 1	Set 2	Set 3
11 Sep; 12:00	Shizuko Sasaki (Japan); Ayumi Takakura (Japan)	1–2	(South Korea) Han Hye-jeong (Indonesia) Elisabeth Tjandra	16–21	21–19	17–21
11 Sep; 14:00	Sreedevi Gadhili (India); Ruchita Sharma (India)	2–0	(France) Caroline Lefèvre (Sweden) Anne-Marie Wellendorph	21–19	21–11	
12 Sep; 13:00	Sreedevi Gadhili (India); Ruchita Sharma (India)	0–2	(South Korea) Han Hye-jeong (Indonesia) Elisabeth Tjandra	15–21	5–21	
12 Sep; 14:00	Shizuko Sasaki (Japan); Ayumi Takakura (Japan)	2–0	(France) Caroline Lefèvre (Sweden) Anne-Marie Wellendorph	21–5	21–7	
13 Sep; 11:45	Sreedevi Gadhili (India); Ruchita Sharma (India)	0–2	(Japan) Shizuko Sasaki (Japan) Ayumi Takakura	9–21	8–21	
13 Sep; 19:40	Han Hye-jeong (South Korea); Elisabeth Tjandra (Indonesia)	2–0	(France) Caroline Lefèvre (Sweden) Anne-Marie Wellendorph	21–12	21–11	

=== Group D ===
Rank	Player	Pts	Pld	W	L	SF	SA	PF	PA
1	(England) Louise Culyer (Denmark) Dorte Steenberg	2	2	2	0	4	0	84	46
2	(India) Deanne Rodrigues (India) Nisha Springett	1	2	1	1	2	2	69	78
3	(Austria) Verena Fastenbauer (Austria) Sigrun Fenkart-Ploner	0	2	0	2	0	4	56	85

Date		Score		Set 1	Set 2	Set 3
11 Sep; 12:00	Louise Culyer (England); Dorte Steenberg (Denmark)	2–0	(Austria) Verena Fastenbauer (Austria) Sigrun Fenkart-Ploner	21–9	21–11	
12 Sep; 13:00	Deanne Rodrigues (India); Nisha Springett (India)	2–0	(Austria) Verena Festenbauer (Austria) Sigrun Fenkart-Ploner	22–20	21–16	
13 Sep; 12:20	Louise Culyer (England); Dorte Steenberg (Denmark)	2–0	(India) Deanne Rodrigues (India) Nisha Springett	21–12	21–14	

=== Finals ===
Quarterfinals
A1	(England) Rebecca Pantaney (England) Lynne Swan	21	21
C1	(Japan) Shizuko Sasaki (Japan) Ayumi Takakura	8	15
B1	(England) Olga Bryant (Russia) Olga Kuznetsova	21	21
D2	(India) Deanne Rodrigues (India) Nisha Tandon	17	18
B2	(India) Supriya Devgun (India) Nancy Tandon	21	21
C1	(South Korea) Han Hye-jeong (Indonesia) Elisabeth Tjandra	19	13
A2	(Spain) Maria Jesus Almagro (Sweden) Pawarisa Wareechol	8	14
D1	(England) Lousie Culyer (Denmark) Dorte Steenberg	21	21

Semifinals
A1	(England) Rebecca Pantaney (England) Lynne Swan	21	19	16
B1	(England) Olga Bryant (Russia) Olga Kuznetsova	12	21	21
B2	(India) Supriya Devgun (India) Nancy Tandon	13	16
D1	(England) Lousie Culyer (Denmark) Dorte Steenberg	21	21

Final
B1	(England) Olga Bryant (Russia) Olga Kuznetsova	12	14
D1	(England) Lousie Culyer (Denmark) Dorte Steenberg	21	21

== Mixed doubles ==
=== Seeds ===
1. (Denmark) Carsten Loesch / Dorte Steenberg (champions, gold medal)
2. (Russia) Vadim Nazarov / Olga Kuznetsova (semifinals, bronze medal)
3. (Japan) Hosemari Fujimoto / Ayumi Takakura (semifinals, bronze medal)
4. (England) Carl Jennings / Joanne Muggeridge (final, silver medal)

=== Finals ===
Semifinals
1	(Denmark) Carsten Loesch (Denmark) Dorte Steenberg	21	22	21
3	(Japan) Hosemari Fujimoto (Japan) Ayumi Takakura	14	24	10
4	(England) Carl Jennings (England) Joanne Muggeridge	21	21
2	(Russia) Vadim Nazarov (Russia) Olga Kuznetsova	13	17

Final
1	(Denmark) Carsten Loesch (Denmark) Dorte Steenberg	21	21
4	(England) Carl Jennings (England) Joanne Muggeridge	17	16

=== Top half ===
==== Section 1 ====
First Round
(India) S Bakshi (India) S Devgun	21	21
(Sweden) J Gate (Spain) M J Almagro	16	17

Second Round
1	(Denmark) C Loesch (Denmark) D Steenberg	21	21
(Sweden) U Svensson (Sweden) M Svedell	15	6
(France) S Andres (France) C Villoin	11	11
(India) S Bakshi (India) S Devgun	21	21

Quarterfinals
1	(Denmark) C Loesch (Denmark) D Steenberg	21	21
(India) S Bakshi (India) S Devgun	13	8

==== Section 2 ====
First Round
(India) U Fadnis (India) N Springett	21	20	21
(Denmark) M Aarup (England) L Culyer	10	22	16

Second Round
3	(Japan) H Fujimoto (Japan) A Takakura	21	21
(England) M Trebble (England) R Pantaney	12	14
(Sweden) P Roos (Austria) S Fenkart-Ploner	16	7
(India) U Fadnis (India) N Springett	21	21

Quarterfinals
3	(Japan) H Fujimoto (Japan) A Takakura	21	21
(India) U Fadnis (India) N Springett	16	19

=== Bottom half ===
==== Section 3 ====
First Round
(India) S Chouta (India) S Holla	14	21	22
(Sri Lanka) L Homer (Sri Lanka) R C Hettiarachchige	21	14	24

Second Round
(Sri Lanka) L Homer (Sri Lanka) R C Hettiarachchige	21	21
(France) C Jallamion (France) C Lefèvre	13	4
(Norway) V Næss (Norway) A Olsen	4	4
4	(England) C Jennings (England) J Muggeridge	21	21

Quarterfinals
(Sri Lanka) L Homer (Sri Lanka) R C Hettiarachchige	12	10
4	(England) C Jennings (England) J Muggeridge	21	21

==== Section 4 ====
First Round
(Germany) T Nirschl (Germany) Y Wang	21	21
(Uzbekistan) O Savatugin (Uzbekistan) Y Katerinich	10	14

Second Round
(Germany) T Nirschl (Germany) Y Wang
(Indonesia) L W Chandra (Indonesia) E Tjandra	w	/	o
(India) M Ponnusamy (India) N Nallam	8	9
2	(Russia) V Nazarov (Russia) O Kuznetsova	21	21

Quarterfinals
(Indonesia) L W Chandra (Indonesia) E Tjandra	13	9
2	(Russia) V Nazarov (Russia) O Kuznetsova	21	21
