= Macchiarini =

Macchiarini is an Italian surname. Notable people with the surname include:

- Paolo Macchiarini (born 1958), Italian thoracic surgeon and fraudster
- Peter Macchiarini (1909–2001), Italian-American jeweler and sculptor
