= Frei (surname) =

Frei is a surname. Notable people with the surname include:

- Alexander Frei, Swiss football player
- Alexander Frei (racing driver) (born 1954), Swiss racing driver
- Arturo Frei, Chilean politician
- Beatrice Frei, Swiss curler
- Carl Frei, German organ builder
- Carmen Frei, Chilean politician
- Christian Frei, Swiss filmmaker
- Eduardo Frei Montalva, president of Chile
- Eduardo Frei Ruiz-Tagle, president of Chile
- Emil Frei, American physician and oncologist
- Fabian Frei, Swiss football player
- Frances X. Frei, American academic and businesswoman
- Günther Frei (born 1942), Swiss mathematician and historian of mathematics
- Hans Wilhelm Frei, American theologian
- Heinz Frei, Swiss wheelchair athlete
- Jerry Frei, American basketball coach
- Karl Frei, Swiss gymnast
- Kerim Frei, Turkish-Swiss football player
- Markus Frei, Swiss football manager
- Matt Frei (born 1963), British journalist and broadcaster
- Max Frei, pen name of Ukrainian/Russian fantasy writer Svetlana Martynchik
- Peter Frei, Swiss skier
- Sandra Frei, Swiss snowboarder
- Stefan Frei, Swiss football player
- Tanya Frei, Swiss curler
- Thomas Frei, Swiss bicycle racer
- Thomas Frei (biathlete), Swiss biathlete
- Thorsten Frei (born 1973), German politician
- Viva Frei (born 1979), pseudonym of Canadian lawyer and YouTuber David Freiheit
- Wilhelm Siegmund Frei, German medical researcher

== See also ==
- Frai
- Fray (surname)
- Frey (surname)
- Frei (disambiguation)
