= Joseph C. Smith =

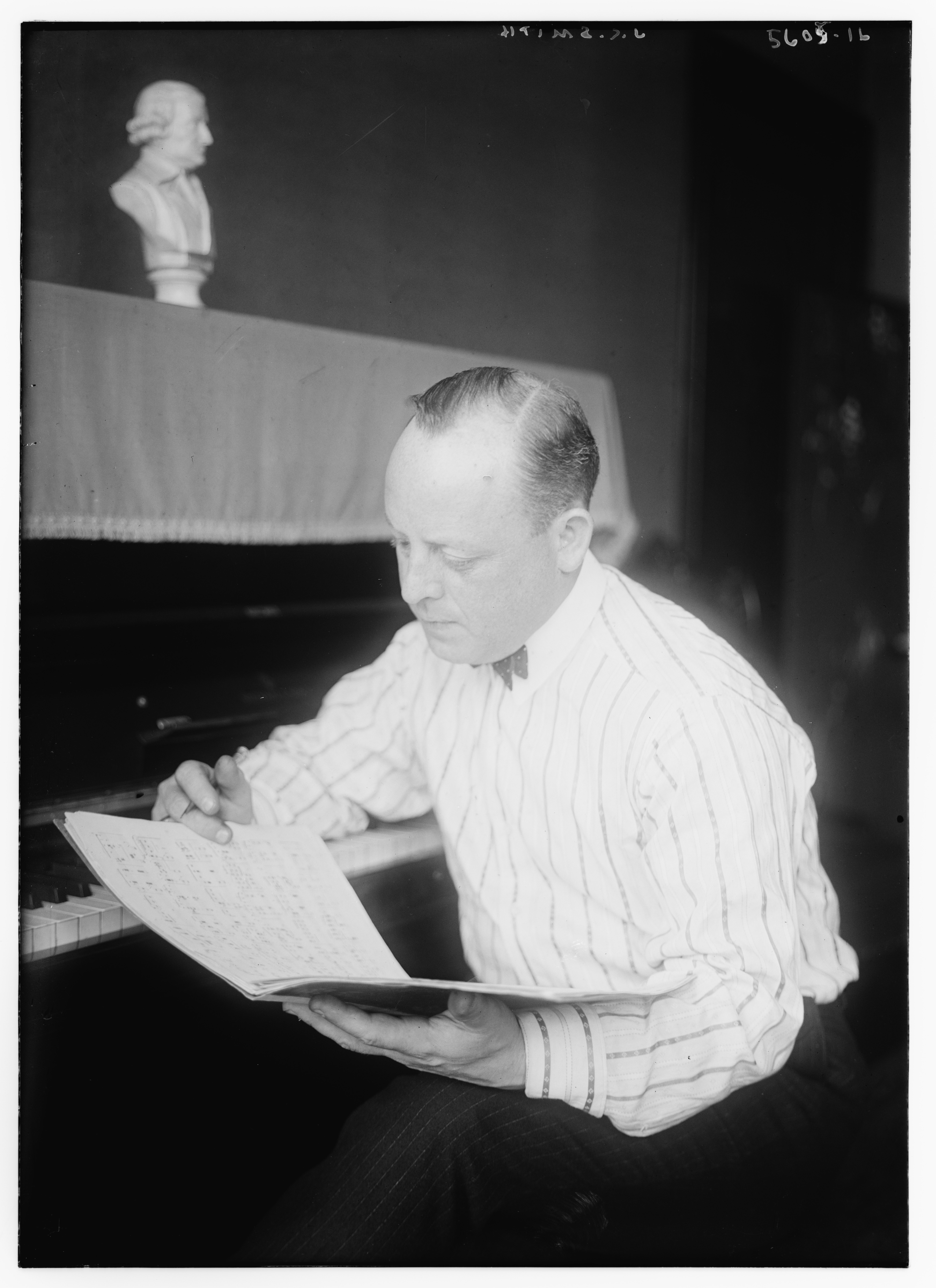
- Joseph C. Smith

Background information
- Birth name: Joseph Cyrus Smith
- Born: August 13, 1883; Sag Harbor, New York
- Died: March 22, 1965 (aged 81); Miami Beach, Florida
- Genres: Dance band
- Occupation(s): Bandleader, conductor, arranger
- Years active: 1900–1945
- Labels: Victor, Brunswick

Joseph Cyrus Smith (August 13, 1883 – March 22, 1965) was an American violinist, composer, dance band leader and recording artist most popular in the second and third decades of the 20th century.

== Biography ==
Joseph Cyrus Smith was born in Sag Harbor, New York in 1883. He was of Russian ancestry on his father's side, and Austrian on his mother's. He was a working musician by the time he was 16, and by 1903 was known for working in dance bands. In 1914 he landed the important post as resident dance band at New York's Plaza Hotel, where he stayed for nine years. He moved to Montreal and began a sequence of broadcasts on station CKAC. In the late 1920s he traveled widely as leader, including Canada, Europe, and both coasts of the United States. From the 1920s through the 1940s he worked as an arranger for the Robbins Music Corporation. He settled down in the New York City area in the 1930s, and retired in 1945, moving to Florida. He died of a myocardial infarction at a Miami Beach hospital on March 22, 1965. At the time of his death he was married to Margaret Lynch.

== Style ==
Smith was instrumental in the transition from the heavy sound of military marching bands so popular before World War 1 to the lighter sounding dance music of the 1920s. Most of his recorded output are instrumentals, although Victor Records would sometimes assign an in-house vocalist to some sides. He was the first to record a Cole Porter song. Although not a jazz unit as thought of in the modern sense, Smith did often use jazz colorings in his arrangements. It was Smith's lack of use of instrumental soloists that led to his sound becoming outdated and the corresponding decline in his popularity as a recording artist.

== Recordings ==
Smith was active as a recording artist from 1916 until 1925. He first recording session was for Victor, and his first recordings met with mediocre success, but in late 1917 several of his records became big sellers. Joel Whitburn estimates that 21 of his records were among the top-15 in popularity at some point. His recording of Smiles, featuring Harry Macdonough on vocals, is estimated to have been the #1 record for a week in August 1918. Many of his records featured medleys taken from current Broadway shows. By 1922 his records were not selling as well, and he made his last recordings for Victor in March of that year. He then recorded briefly for Brunswick Records in 1923. He last recorded in Montreal in 1925.

== Notable alumni ==
- Hugo Frey
- Fred Guy
- Harry Raderman

== Compositions ==
- Lovely Summertime

== Discography ==
- Songs of the Night: Dance Recordings, 1916–1925 (Archeophone, 2015)
