= C. Carl Jennings =

American blacksmith (1910–2003)

- Born: Cecil Carl Jennings; April 10, 1910; Marion, Illinois, U.S.
- Died: May 13, 2003 (aged 93); Sonoma, California, U.S.
- Education: California College of Arts and Crafts (BFA)
- Occupations: Visual artist, metalworker, blacksmith, educator
- Spouse: Elizabeth Anne Gallaghan
- Awards: American Craft Council Fellow (1988)

Cecil Carl Jennings, commonly known as C. Carl Jennings (April 10, 1910 – May 13, 2003), was an American visual artist, metalworker, blacksmith, and educator. He owned El Diablo Forge, later known as C. Carl Jennings Metalsmith in Northern California. Jennings was named a Fellow of the American Craft Council in 1988.

== Life and career ==
Cecil Carl Jennings was born on April 10, 1910, in Marion, Illinois. He was a third generation blacksmith; both his father, John Washington Jennings, and his grandfather, William Parish Jennings, were blacksmiths.

He graduated in 1934 from California College of Arts and Crafts in Oakland (later known as California College of the Arts), where he studied under Harry St. John Dixon Jr. and Jacques Schnier. He completed an apprenticeship under John Forester.

During World War II, he worked at Naval Air Station Alameda as a welder and metalworker.

Jennings was the owner of El Diablo Forge that opened in 1947 in Lafayette, California as a coal forge, in 1965 the business converted to a gas forge for health reasons, and by 1969 it was moved to 3500 Westach Way in Sonoma, California. With the move his business name was changed to C. Carl Jennings Metalsmith, and they acquired 5 acres (2.0 ha) of land. Jennings was known for his creation of architectural details, like iron railings, and light fixtures.

In 1973, Jennings served as one of the judges for the California State Fair art show. Jennings was named a Fellow of the American Craft Council in 1988. He was a member of the Metal Arts Guild of Northern California, and a founding member of the California Blacksmith Association (CBA).

Jennings work can be found in collections, including at the San Francisco Arts Commission.

== Exhibitions ==
=== Solo exhibitions ===
- C. Carl Jennings (1965), solo exhibition, Richmond Art Center, Richmond, California
- Works by C. Carl Jennings (1967), solo exhibitions, Anneberg Gallery, San Francisco, California
- C. Carl Jennings (1990), solo exhibition, National Ornamental Metal Museum, Memphis, Tennessee
- Struck by Modernism, C. Carl Jennings, California Artist-–Blacksmith (2013–2014), solo exhibition, Mingei International Museum, San Diego, California

=== Group exhibitions ===
- Metal Arts (1974), Berkeley Art Center, Berkeley, California; group exhibition featuring artists: Imogene Gieling, Robert R. Coleman, Florence Fullmer Dixon, Tyler James Hoare, C. Carl Jennings, Harriet Johns, Priscilla Kapel, Sandra Lesnewsky, Esther Lewittes, Arthur Lutz, Zella Eckels Marggraf, Richard A. Mayer, George D. McLean, Louis Mueller, E. J. Montgomery, John Nugent, Dalene M. Osterkamp, George Postgate, Merry Renk, Florence Resnikoff, Phyllis H. Smith, Eve Paige Spencer, Naomi Stahl, Martin K. Weber, Anne Wienholt, and Byron August Wilson
- Contemporary Iron '87 (1988), traveling group exhibition organized by the Louisville Art Gallery in Louisville, Kentucky and the Southern Arts Federation in Atlanta
