= Fraij =

Fraij is a surname. Notable people with the surname include:

- Manar Fraij (born 1988), Jordanian footballer
- Rouzbahan Fraij (born 2000), Jordanian footballer

== See also ==
- Freij, another surname
