= Eduardo Frei =

Eduardo Frei may refer to either of two Chilean politicians:

- Eduardo Frei Montalva (1911–1982), president of Chile from 1964 to 1970
- Eduardo Frei Ruiz-Tagle (born 1942), president of Chile from 1994 to 2000, son of the above

== See also ==
- Frei (surname)
- Base Presidente Eduardo Frei Montalva, an Antarctic base of Chile
