= Frei =

Frei may refer to:

== People ==
- Frei family, a Chilean family formed by the descendants of Swiss Eduardo Frei Schlinz and Chilean Victoria Montalva Martínez
- Frei (surname), a surname
- Frei Otto, German architect

== Places ==
=== Norway ===
- Frei Municipality, a former municipality in Møre og Romsdal county
- Frei (island), an island in Kristiansund Municipality, Møre og Romsdal county
- Frei, or Nedre Frei, a village in Kristiansund Municipality, Møre og Romsdal county
- Frei Church, a church in Kristiansund Municipality, Møre og Romsdal county

== Other ==
- Frei (album), the fifth studio album by German recording artist LaFee
- Frei test, a test developed in 1925 by Wilhelm Siegmund Frei, a German dermatologist, to identify lymphogranuloma inguinale

== See also ==
- Fray (disambiguation)
- Frey (disambiguation)
- Frej (disambiguation)
