= Frai =

Frai is a surname. Notable people with the surname include:

- Athina Frai (born 1976), Greek windsurfer
- Felicita Frai (1909–2010), Czech-born Italian painter

== See also ==
- FRAI
- Fray (surname)
- Frei (disambiguation)
