= Frey (surname) =

Frey is a surname of German origin, from the Middle High German word "vri," meaning "free," and as a name, it referred to a free man, as opposed to a bondsman or serf in the feudal system. Other variations include Freyr, Freyer, Freyda, Freyman, Freyberg, Freystein, Fray, Frayr, Frayda, Frayberg, Frayman, Freeman.

Frey is the surname of the following people:

== People ==
- Aaron Frey, American politician
- Albert Frey (disambiguation), multiple people
- Alexander Frey (politician) (1877–1945), Finnish politician and banker
- Alexander Frey, American conductor
- Alexander Moritz Frey, German author
- Alice Frey, Belgian painter
- Allan H. Frey, American neuroscientist
- Amber Frey
- Bernard Frey, appellant in Frey v. Fedoruk et al.
- Bruno Frey, Swiss economist
- Casey Frey, American actor, comedian, dancer
- Christopher Frey, German writer
- Darcy Frey, American writer
- Diana Frey, Argentine film producer
- Donald N. Frey, an American innovator in manufacturing
- Emil Frey (1838–1922), Swiss politician
- Emilio Frey (1872–1964), Argentine geographer
- Enea Frey (born 2008), Swiss racing driver
- Gerhard Frey (mathematician) (born 1944), German mathematician
- Gerhard Frey (politician), (1933–2013) German politician
- Glenn Frey (1948–2016), American recording artist and actor
- Greg Frey, American football player
- Heinrich Frey (1822–1890), Swiss entomologist
- Henri-Nicolas Frey (1847–1932), French major general
- Hugo Frey (musician), American musician
- Hugo Frey, German fighter pilot
- Imogene Gieling (1923–2024; born as Imogene Bailey Frey), American metalsmith, jewelry designer, and educator
- Jacob L. Frey (born 1981), Mayor of Minneapolis (2018-current)
- James Frey, American writer
- James N. Frey, American writer
- Jim Frey, American baseball manager
- John H. Frey, American government and political leader
- John P. Frey, American labor activist
- Joseph Samuel C. F. Frey (born Joseph Levi; 1771–1850), missionary
- Konrad Frey, German gymnast
- Leonard Frey, American actor
- Lonny Frey, American baseball player
- Louis Frey, Jr. (1934–2019), American politician
- Łucja Frey, Polish physician and neurologist
- Martin Frey (1904–1971), German politician
- Max Frey (1874–1944), German painter and graphic artist
- Mogens Frey, Danish cyclist
- Nicolas Frey, French footballer, brother of Sébastien
- Oliver Frey, Swiss magazine illustrator
- Oliver W. Frey, American politician
- Paul Frey, Canadian operatic tenor
- Perry A. Frey, American biochemist
- Peter Frey (journalist), German journalist
- Peter Frey (sailor) (born 1949), Swiss sailor
- Petra Frey, Austrian singer
- Rahel Frey, Swiss racing driver
- Raymond Frey (1941–2012), American philosopher
- Raymond E. Frey (physicist) (born 1956), American physicist
- R. Scott Frey, American contemporary sociologist
- Richard Karl Hjalmar Frey (1886–1965), Finnish entomologist
- Richard L. Frey, (1905–1988), American bridge player
- Roger Frey (1913–1997), French politician
- Sébastien Frey (born 1980), French football goalkeeper, brother of Nicolas
- Stephen Frey, American author
- Steve Frey, American baseball player
- Toomas Frey, Estonian botanist and ecologist
- William J. Frey (1929–2011), American politician, businessman, and farmer

== Fictional characters ==
- House Frey, from A Song of Ice and Fire
- Dieter Frey, from Call for the Dead le Carre

== See also ==
- Freya (disambiguation)
- Fry (surname)
- Frye
- Fray (surname)
- Frei (surname)
