= Margery Anneberg =

American museum founder, jeweler and curator (1966–1981)

- Born: Margery Channing Anneberg; November 29, 1921. Carroll, Iowa, United States
- Died: May 19, 2003 (aged 81); San Francisco, California, United States
- Other names: Margery Anneburg, Margery Annenberg
- Education: University of Washington
- Occupations: Goldsmith, jeweler, gallerist, curator, museum founder, museum director, art collector
- Known for: Curation of jewelry, craft, American folk art, and international folk art
- Awards: Honorary Fellow of American Craft Council (1979)

Margery Channing Anneberg (1921–2003) was an American museum founder and museum director, curator, gallerist, goldsmith, and jeweler. She founded the Anneberg Gallery (1966–1981) in San Francisco, considered the first professional contemporary craft gallery; and she co-founded the San Francisco Craft and Folk Art Museum (1983–2012). She was named an honorary fellow by the American Craft Council (ACC) in 1979.

== Early life and education ==
Margery Anneberg was born in 1921 in Carroll, Iowa; and she was raised in Longview, Washington. She studied in the Far Eastern and Russian Institute (now the Henry M. Jackson School of International Studies) at the University of Washington. In 1957, she moved to California.

== Career ==
Anneberg won a crafts prize for her gold and silver necklace during the San Francisco Arts Commission's "Arts Festival in Civic Center Plaza" in 1966; and the top prize was awarded to Ruth Asawa for a metal tree sculpture. Anneberg was a member of the Metal Arts Guild of San Francisco.

=== Anneberg Gallery ===
Anneberg founded a gallery selling crafts and displaying local artists in 1966, initially named The Jewelry Shop and Gallery on Hyde Street; a year later it was renamed as the Anneberg Gallery. Her gallery also sold international contemporary folk art (such as textiles, masks, baskets, metalwork, and sculptures), with a few pieces of historical folk art. It was the first professional gallery for contemporary crafts. The gallery closed in 1981.

=== Center for Folk Art and Contemporary Crafts ===
In 1972, Anneberg co-founded the Center for Folk Art and Contemporary Crafts, a nonprofit focused on crafts and folk, which never had a building.

=== Museum of Craft and Folk Art ===
In October 1983, Anneberg and Gertrud V. Parker co-founded the San Francisco Craft and Folk Art Museum on Balboa Street at 6th Avenue in the inner Richmond District; it occupied a 2,400 square feet (220 m^{2}) building that once housed a psychiatric hospital. The museum collection was decommissioned in 1991, with three quarters of the work placed into educational institutions. San Francisco Craft and Folk Art Museum was later known as the Museum of Craft and Folk Art (MOCFA), and was relocated to Fort Mason Center. The museum held more than 200 exhibitions, and closed in 2012.

== Late life and death ==
In her later life she was diagnosed with multiple sclerosis, which progressed and forced an early retirement in 1986. She died on May 19, 2003 in a hospital, from complications of multiple sclerosis.

Her work can be found in the collection at the San Francisco Arts Commission.

== Publications ==
- A General Handbook of China. Vol. 1. Margery Anneberg, et al. Seattle, Washington: Far Eastern and Russian Institute, University of Washington. 1956.
- Anneberg, Margery (1984). Native Arts of Luzon Collected By William S. Galvin. San Francisco Crafts and Folk Art Museum.
