= Donald Fry =

Donald Fry may refer to:

- Donald C. Fry (born 1955), American politician
- Donald K. Fry (born 1937), American writer and scholar
- Don Fry, Australian engineer, entrepreneur and philanthropist

== See also ==
- Don Frye (born 1965), American mixed martial artist
