= Florence Resnikoff =

American artist and educator (1920–2013)

- Born: Florence Lisa Herman; 1920
- Died: April 8, 2013 (aged 92–93)
- Known for: Jewelry, sculpture
- Spouse: George J. Resnikoff
- Children: 1
- Website: Official website

Florence Lisa Resnikoff (née Herman; 1920–2013) was an American artist and educator in the fields of metals and jewelry.

== Early life and education ==
Florence Lisa Herman was born in 1920 in Fort Worth, Texas. She began making jewelry in 1948 while attending the Ox-Bow Summer School of Painting, affiliated with the Art Institute of Chicago, in Saugatuck, Michigan.

In 1951, she was a founding member of the Metal Arts Guild of San Francisco, an organization led by Margaret De Patta. She received her Bachelor of Fine Arts (B.F.A.) degree in 1967 in sculpture from the California College of Arts and Crafts (now California College of the Arts); and an M.A. degree in 1973 from San Jose State University. She had studied under Bob Winston at the California College of Arts and Crafts.

== Career ==
Transposed Inlay Neckpiece, 1978

Resnikoff's early designs were cast or constructed designs that followed the principles of the modernists‍—‌materials and function defined the character of the piece. However, unlike the modernists, she rejected simplicity and often added embellishments, ornaments, and bright colors. She developed as an artist, mastering different techniques such as electroforming, anodizing, plique-à-jour, keum-boo, and mokume-gane, working with gold, silver, platinum, pewter, copper, bronze, titanium, and niobium. She used these different techniques to pursue her lifelong interest in color, employing enamel, patinas, cast resins and more to expand her palette. Her unusual combinations of metals and gemstones are a defining characteristic of her work.

In the mid-1960s, Resnikoff became interested in other metals and larger forms, leading her to undergo formal training in sculpture. While her jewelry was gaining notoriety, appearing in many shows across the country, Resnikoff moved away from working with precious stones and pursued her development as a metalsmith. After moving back to California in 1965, she resumed her education, and received a fellowship from the National Endowment for the Arts to study electroforming techniques and their application to jewelry and metalsmithing. This led her to concentrate more on metal in combinations with bronze, silver, and copper.

In 1973, Resnikoff began teaching at the California College of Arts and Crafts in the Jewelry Metal Arts Program, becoming Program Head in 1980. She retired as Professor Emerita in 1989.

== Work ==
Resnikoff's work can be found in the permanent collections of the City and County of San Francisco, the Oakland Museum of California, the Smithsonian American Art Museum, and the Museum of Arts and Design in New York.

Some of her work in the permanent collection of the Oakland Museum was involved in the theft of over 1,000 objects from the Museum's off-site storage facility on October 15, 2025. Lost pieces include "Rutilated Quartz Dome Neckpiece", Slot-Hinged Ttianium Neckpiece", and "Reversible Marine Necklace".

== Teaching ==
Resnikoff taught at California College of the Arts, where she was head of the metal arts program, from 1977 to 1989.

== Personal life ==
Resnikoff was married to her husband, George J. Resnikoff, for 50 years before he died in 1994. The family moved in the 1950s to Palo Alto, California. She has one son, Carl Resnikoff.

== Exhibitions ==
- Metal Arts (1974), Berkeley Art Center, Berkeley, California; group exhibition featuring artists: Imogene Gieling, Robert R. Coleman, Florence Fullmer Dixon, Tyler James Hoare, C. Carl Jennings, Harriet Johns, Priscilla Kapel, Sandra Lesnewsky, Esther Lewittes, Arthur Lutz, Zella Eckels Marggraf, Richard A. Mayer, George D. McLean, Louis Mueller, E. J. Montgomery, John Nugent, Dalene M. Osterkamp, George Postgate, Merry Renk, Florence Resnikoff, Phyllis H. Smith, Eve Paige Spencer, Naomi Stahl, Martin K. Weber, Anne Wienholt, and Byron August Wilson
