= Freij =

Freij is a surname. Notable people with the surname include:

- Alfons Freij (born 2006), Swedish ice hockey player
- Elias Freij (1918–1998), Palestinian Christian politician, longtime mayor of Bethlehem
- Gustav Freij (1922–1973), Swedish Greco-Roman wrestler
- Leif Freij (1943–1998), Swedish Greco-Roman wrestler, nephew of Gustav

== See also ==
- Fahd Jassem al-Freij (born 1950), Syrian Minister of Defense
- Manar Fraij (born 1988), Jordanian football coach and former player
- Rouzbahan Fraij (born 2000), Jordanian footballer
- Frej (disambiguation)
