= Frej =

Frej may refer to:

- Frej (given name), a list of people
- Frej (surname), a list of people
- Frej (icebreaker), a 1974 ship named after Freyr
- IK Frej, a Swedish sports club located in Täby kyrkby

== See also ==
- Frei (disambiguation)
- Frey (disambiguation)
