= Robert Frye =

Robert Frye may refer to:

- Robert Frye (MP for New Shoreham), 1385-1399, MP for New Shoreham
- Robert Frye (died 1435), MP for Shaftesbury and Wilton

== See also ==
- Robert Fry (disambiguation)
