= Ursula Ilse-Neuman =

Art curator

Ursula Ilse-Neuman is an independent curator whose work has focused on the field of decorative arts and jewelry curation. With a career spanning over three decades and more than 40 exhibitions, many of Ilse-Neuman's notable contributions were made at the Museum of Arts & Design (MAD), formerly known as the American Craft Museum, in New York City, where she served as Curator of Jewelry before assuming the position of Curator Emerita.

== Career ==
Between 1992 and 2014, Ilse-Neuman served as a Curator of Jewelry at the Museum of Arts and Design. During her tenure at MAD, Ilse-Neuman curated numerous exhibitions that explored the intersection of art, craft, and design. Some of her exhibitions which received significant press and industry attention include "Jewelry of Ideas: Gifts from the Susan Grant Lewin Collection" (2017), “Multiple Exposures: Photography and jewelry” (2014) "Space, Light, Structure: Margaret De Patta Retrospective" (2012), and "Inspired Jewelry: Jewelry from the Museum of Arts and Design" (2009), among others.

Ilse-Neuman has lectured nationally and internationally and guest curated numerous exhibitions most recently at the “A Collector's Journey,” at the Lowe Art Museum, Miami, “Rings Redux: The Susan Lewin Collection (SCAD Museum of Art); ( 2021), “Jewelry of Ideas.”" (2017) (Cooper Hewitt, Smithsonian Design Museum), and the contemporary American jewelry section in the “Abhushan” exhibition in New Delhi, India - an exhibition which was sponsored by the World Crafts Council.

Ilse-Neuman has served as a juror for several global exhibitions, including the Smithsonian Craft Show 2024, Sonderschau Schmuck in Munich, Germany, the Exhibition in Print 2004 by the Society of North American Goldsmiths, MetalSmith Magazine, and the International Jewelry Expo in Shanghai.
