= David Fry =

David Fry may refer to:

- David Fry (politician) (born 1957), Australian politician
- David Fry (footballer) (born 1960), English football goalkeeper
- David Fry (baseball) (born 1995), American baseball player
- David Fry, American publisher, owner of I-5 Publishing, later Lumina Media
- David Lee Fry, American militant, member of Citizens for Constitutional Freedom

== See also ==
- David Fried (born 1962), American artist
- David L. Fried (born 1933), American scientist in optics
- David Fries (born 1960), American scientist and author in advanced robotics and ocean sensors
- David Frye (1933–2011), American comedian
- David Frye (American football) (born 1961), American football player
