= Mae Carroll Fry =

American politician

Mae Carroll Fry was an American politician and schoolteacher. She was married to John Henry Fry in 1908. A Republican, she lived in Denver and served in the Colorado House of Representatives from 1927 to 1928. She was nominated to run again for the next session but failed to get elected with 3.4% of the vote.

She was born in Colorado where she lived for most of her life. After graduating from the University of Colorado Boulder in 1901 with a bachelor of science degree, Fry taught for eight years. She died after a lingering illness on December 4, 1940, in Pasadena, California.
