= David Fries =

American scientist (born 1960)

- Born: 1960 (age 65–66); Pittsburgh, Pennsylvania
- Education: University of Pittsburgh; University of South Florida
- Occupations: Research Scientist, Inventor
- Awards: Fellow of the National Academy of Inventors
- Website: https://www.ihmc.us/groups/david-fries/

David Fries is an American scientist at the Institute for Human Machine Cognition, researcher, professor, entrepreneur and author in the fields of advanced robotics and ocean sensors. He is the co-founder of Intelligent Micropatterning LLC, co-founder and CTO of Spyglass Technologies, and Founder of SciFlies, a non-profit organization, and its formal president.

== Research ==
Fries’ research includes the development of micro-systems and robotics/automation for sensing applications, advanced sensor development (e.g. chemical, physical and biological probes technologies) and mobile robotic systems for field applications. His technical activities also involved advanced manufacturing technology, systems technology, medical instrumentation, technology commercialization, and arts-science. His research in ocean testing and sensing include sonar mapping of a Pensacola estuary, along with collecting mass spectrometer data to inform the City of Pensacola of its Bayou's water quality. His technology is most known for detecting oil spill contamination and submarines. While at the University of South Florida, Fries developed underwater autonomous vehicle technologies to test water quality of the St. Petersburg, FL waterways and tweet publicly, real-time water composition updates.

== Publications and patents ==
David Fries has composed, in part, over 30 peer-reviewed publications, as well as over 40 publications and proceedings. In 2016, his technical writings on Non-Acoustic Sensors, in partnership with William Kirkwood, were included in the “Springer Handbook of Ocean Engineering” He holds more than 35 U.S. patents, 13 of which have been licensed to seven separate companies.

== Awards and boards ==
- Fellow of the National Academy of Inventors (NAI)
- Board of Directors, Science Center of Pinellas
