= Adam Fry =

English footballer (born 1985)

Personal information
- Date of birth: 9 February 1985 (age 41)
- Place of birth: Luton, England
- Position: Midfielder

Youth career
- –2002: Peterborough United

Senior career*
| Years | Team | Apps | (Gls) |
| 2002–2007 | Peterborough United | 3 | (0) |
- * Club domestic league appearances and goals

Adam Fry (born 9 February 1985) is an English former professional footballer. He is the son of Peterborough United's former manager and owner Barry Fry.

== Career ==
Adam was part of the successful Peterborough United youth team that won the youth league and signed his first professional contract at the age of 17. He was invited to train with Manchester United and represented the Red Devils in the Milk Cup. He also captained the Posh side in his father's testimonial fixture with a Manchester United side that included Wayne Rooney and Cristiano Ronaldo. Adam also took part in the Sky One documentary 'Big Ron Manager' which was a series that followed Peterborough United's fortunes.

Adam gained further playing experience in Scotland and Finland, before injuries and illness curtailed his promising career in the game and he was told by a surgeon that he could no longer play at a professional level.

Since he stopped playing football professionally, Adam has been working for Sports on Screen, a sports modelling agency that film commercials all over world. Adam has filmed for them in a number of cities all over Europe and worked with a number of big names in sport like David Beckham and Steve Gerrard for brands including Adidas, Nike and Nivea.

Adam is currently in the process of taking his UEFA 'B' Licence with the PFA after gaining experience working with Premier League side Arsenal in Vietnam.
