= Small Fry =

Small Fry may refer to:

- Small fry (fish), a recently hatched fish
- "Small Fry" (short story), 1885 Anton Chekhov story
- "Small Fry" (song), a song written in 1938 by Hoagy Carmichael and Frank Loesser
- Small Fry (album), 1941 Bing Crosby album
- Small Fry (film), 2011 Pixar animated short
- Small Fry (memoir), 2018 memoir by Lisa Brennan-Jobs
- Small Fry, 2021 song by BoyWithUke and Curio Watts

== See also ==
- Small Fry Club, 1940s TV series hosted by Bob Emery
- Small & Frye, 1983 TV series produced by Disney
