= Alexander Fry =

English entomologist

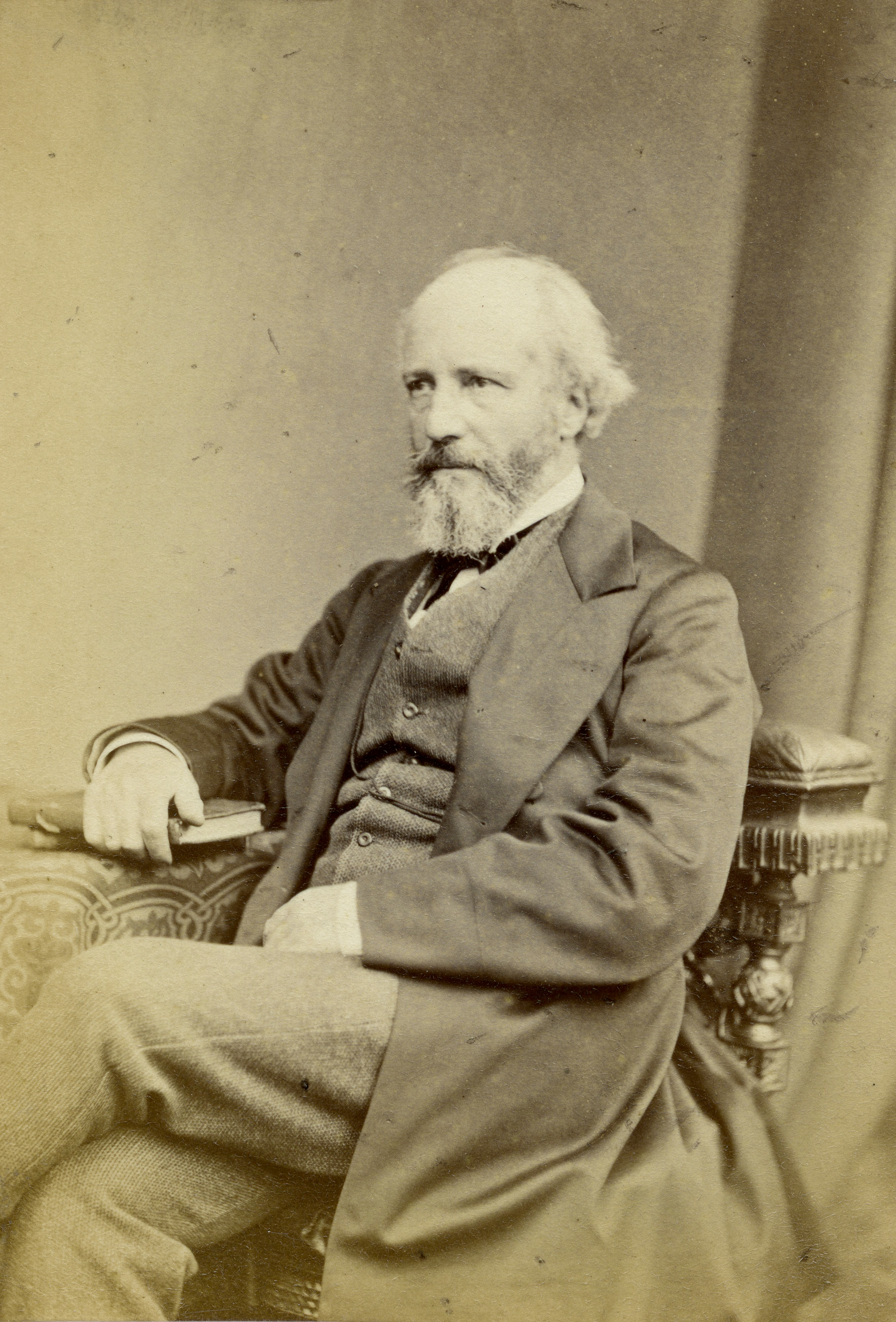
c. 1870

Alexander Fry (10 September 1821, Pencraig, Herefordshire − 26 February 1905) was a wealthy English entomologist who specialised in collecting Coleoptera. His collection of 200,000 specimens was bequeathed to the British Museum and is one of the largest acquisitions of beetles. Fry collected beetles on his own, living in Rio de Janeiro for 16 years, as well as obtaining specimens through a network of collectors.

== Life and work ==
Fry was born to Esther and Edward Winne Fry (d. 1849). In 1838 Alexander Fry entered his father's mercantile business house in Rio de Janeiro, Brazil. He became a partner in 1843. Except for once returning to England in 1843 to marry, he lived in Rio until 1854 when he moved back to London. Fry married Caroline David Mercy, the sister of his business partner Francis Charles Miers of Fry, Miers and Co. He continued to visit Rio even after moving back. Fry and his wife lived at Norwood. They had no children. Fry bequeathed his collection of some 200,000 specimens to the Natural History Museum, London. The collection includes beetles collected from around the world but was especially rich in South American insects, Longicornia and Curculionidae. He also donated his library of 611 volumes to the museum.

Fry became a Member of the Entomological Society of London in 1885. Fry was an enthusiastic collector and in addition to his own beetles he added by purchase the collections of Frederic Parry (Longicornia), Alfred Russel Wallace, William Doherty, and the ‘'very fine'’ series collected by John Whitehead at Kinabalu, which included all the holotypes described by Henry Walter Bates. He did no descriptive work but many parts of his collection were named by other entomologists including Andrew Murray and Francis P. Pascoe, it is therefore type rich. Murray examined a stick insect from the Fry collection that Fry had obtained from someone else and had incorrectly suggested, based on Fry's second-hand information, that it was semi-aquatic. Systena fryi was named after him from his collections by G. E. Bryant as also the plant hopper Alphina fryi by W. L. Distant.
