= Doug Fry =

Australian rugby league footballer

Doug Fry (11 November 1918 – 27 September 1992) was a professional rugby league footballer in the Australian competition the New South Wales Rugby League.

Fry played for the Eastern Suburbs club in the seasons 1942–45.
