= Stephen Fry (disambiguation) =

Stephen Fry (born 1957) is an English actor, screenwriter, author, playwright, journalist, poet, comedian, television presenter and film director.

Stephen Fry may also refer to:

- Stephen Fry (cricketer) (1900–1979), English cricketer
- Stephen Fry (rugby union) (1924–2002), South African rugby union player
- Stephen Fry: The Secret Life of the Manic Depressive, 2006 television documentary
- Stephen Fry, the earth scientist who developed the concept of ultra-prominent peaks in the state of Washington, USA, in the 1980s
