= Bob Winston (jeweler) =

American artist, jeweler (1915–2003)

- Born: Charles Robert Winston; April 5, 1915; Long Beach, California, U.S.
- Died: April 9, 2003 (aged 88); Pleasant Hill, California, U.S.
- Occupation(s): Educator, jeweler, sculptor
- Known for: Modernist jewelry, organic shaped sculpture

Charles Robert Winston (1915 – 2003) was an American jeweler, sculptor, and educator. He was known for his organic forms and sculptural jewelry in 1950s and 1960s. Winston was a co-founder of the Metal Arts Guild of San Francisco, a non-profit, arts educational organization. In 1997, he was honored as a Fellow of the American Craft Council.

== Biography ==
Winston taught at the California College of Arts and Crafts (now California College of the Arts) from c. 1942 to 1956. His students included Florence Resnikoff, Irena Brynner, and Robert Dhaemers. He has been credited with reviving (within the period of 1950s Modernism) the metalsmith processes of lost-wax casting, and centrifugal casting.

In 1951, he was featured on the television program "Art in Your Life" by the San Francisco Art Museum (now San Francisco Museum of Modern Art), where he described his mobile sculpture making process. Winston created public play sculpture named, "Oakland Monster" or "Mid Century Monster" (1952) at Lake Merritt near Bellevue Avenue in Oakland.

Winston died on April 9, 2003, and was remembered by SFGate as "a consummate Bay Area jewelry designer, sculptor, instructor, and author."

== Exhibitions ==
In 1954, Winston was part of a group exhibition of jewelry at Gallery of America House by the American Craftsmen's Educational Council in New York City; other participants included Margaret De Patta, Mary Schimpff, Robert von Neumann, and John Paul Miller. In 1985, he was part of the group exhibition, Structure and Ornament: American Modernist Jewelry 1940–1960 shown at Fifty-50 Gallery, New York City.
