= Fry Mountains =

Mountain range in California, United States

- Location within California

Highest point
- Elevation: 1,350 m (4,430 ft)

Geography
- Country: United States
- State: California
- District: San Bernardino County
- Range coordinates: 34°34′6.984″N 116°42′28.100″W
- Topo map: USGS Fry Mountains

The Fry Mountains are a mountain range in San Bernardino County, California.
