= Henry Fry =

Henry Fry may refer to:

- Henry Fry (merchant) (1826–1896), ship-broker, ship owner and commission merchant
- Henry Fry (anthropologist) (1886–1959), Australian physician and anthropologist
- Henry Fry (politician) (1826–1892), Canadian MLA for Cowichan
- Henry Fry (rugby union), English international rugby union player

== See also ==
- Henry Frye (born 1932), previous chief justice North Carolina Supreme Court
