= Fry Group Foods =

South African/Australian manufacturer of vegan meat analogues

Fry Group Foods (Pty) Ltd
- Trade name: The Fry Family Food Co.
- Company type: Private
- Industry: Food
- Founded: 1991; 35 years ago in Durban, South Africa
- Founders: Wally Fry; Debbie Fry
- Headquarters: Durban, South Africa
- Areas served: Worldwide
- Key people: Wally Fry (Founder) Tammy Fry (Co-Founder) Debbie Fry (Founder) Hayley Fry (Co-Founder)
- Products: Meat analogues
- Production output: 40 tons per day (2018)
- Brands: Fry's
- Number of employees: 400 (2018)
- Website: fryfamilyfood.com

Fry Group Foods is a manufacturer of vegan meat substitutes founded by South Africans Wally and Debbie Fry in 1991. In 2020 it was acquired by LiveKindly, a plant-based food company.

== History ==
Wally Fry is a vegan convert who once ate meat and traded livestock for a living. He decided to follow the example of his vegetarian wife Debbie and daughter Tammy after observing the inhumane conditions in a working pig farming facility built by his own construction firm. The couple created meat substitutes in their Durban home for personal consumption to help Wally adapt to his new meat-free diet. Due to growing demand from others, they eventually registered a company to manufacture meat substitutes on a commercial scale in 1991. As public demand for vegan food in South Africa was marginal at the time, the company had to innovate as a manufacturer in a new market. Since inception, the company has also advocated for a plant-based diet via public awareness campaigns including Meat-Free Monday and Veganuary.

== Locations ==
In 1998 the company began exporting its meat substitutes from South Africa to Australia, where its headquarters have been based since 2014. As of 2018 its frozen food products, which are manufactured in a custom-built factory in Durban and by a contractor in Cornwall, are sold by supermarket chains and other retailers in over 30 countries. In 2020 the brand became part of the stable of plant-based food brands under LIVEKINDLY Collective - opening up its export market potential. Currently its biggest markets are South Africa, UK and Australia.

== Products ==
The product range initially consisted of only a handful of basics including sausages, hot dogs, and burger patties. As of 2023 it has expanded to include more than 40 products —including schnitzels, sausage rolls, chicken-style nuggets, stir-fry strips, pea protein mince, plant-based popcorn (chick'n style), polony and more—which are made without any meat, egg, or dairy ingredients. The unpatented plant-based meat substitutes are made from legumes, grains, natural flavourings, and spices, and do not contain any genetically modified ingredients.

== Reception ==
=== Endorsements ===
- Vegetarian Society Approved

=== Awards ===
Fry Group Foods has won numerous awards for its products. It received the 2010 Ernst & Young Entrepreneur of the Year Award (Emerging category) from the Ernst & Young South Africa chapter, the 2013 Green Lifestyle Award for Food (Company), the 2016 Food Bev SETA Gold Award (Medium Companies category), and the 2017 Anuga Taste Innovation Award for Soy and Flaxseed Schnitzel. It was the recipient of the VegfestUK Award for Best Vegan "Meat" in 2017, 2018,

== See also ==
- List of meat substitutes
