= Joseph Fry =

Joseph Fry(e) may refer to:

- Joseph Storrs Fry (1769–1835), owner of a chocolate factory
- Joseph Storrs Fry II (1826–1913), grandson of the first Joseph Storrs Fry
- Joseph Fry (tea merchant) (1777–1861), tea dealer and banker, husband of Elizabeth Fry, the prison reformer, cousin of Joseph Storrs Fry
- Joseph Fry (type-founder) (1728–1787), Bristol businessman, father of Joseph Storrs Fry
- Joseph Fry Jr. (1781–1860), US Representative from Pennsylvania
- Joe Fry (1915–1950), racing driver
- Joseph Frye (1712–1794), American military leader during the Revolutionary War
- Joseph Frye, designer and proponent of Fort Frye in the Ohio Country during the Northwest Indian War
- Joseph Fry (1826–1873), US Naval Officer and Confederate Civil War veteran
