= Frey (given name) =

Frey, Frei, Fray, Frej, Freij, Freyr or Freÿr is the given name of the following people

- Freyr Alexandersson (born 1982), Icelandic football coach and former player
- Frei Caneca (1779–1825), Brazilian religious leader, politician, and journalist
- Frei Galvão (1739–1822), also known as Saint Anthony of St. Ann Galvão, was a Brazilian friar of the Franciscan Order
- Frej Larsson (born 1983), Swedish musician and rapper
- Frej Liewendahl (1902–1966), Finnish runner
- Frej Lindqvist (born 1937), Swedish actor
- Frej Ossiannilsson (1905–1995), Swedish entomologist
- Frey Svenson (1866–1927), Swedish doctor
- Frei Otto (1925–2015), German architect and structural engineer
- Frei Tito (1945–1974), Brazilian Roman Catholic friar
