= Max Frei =

Ukrainian writer

Max Frei (Макс Фрай)
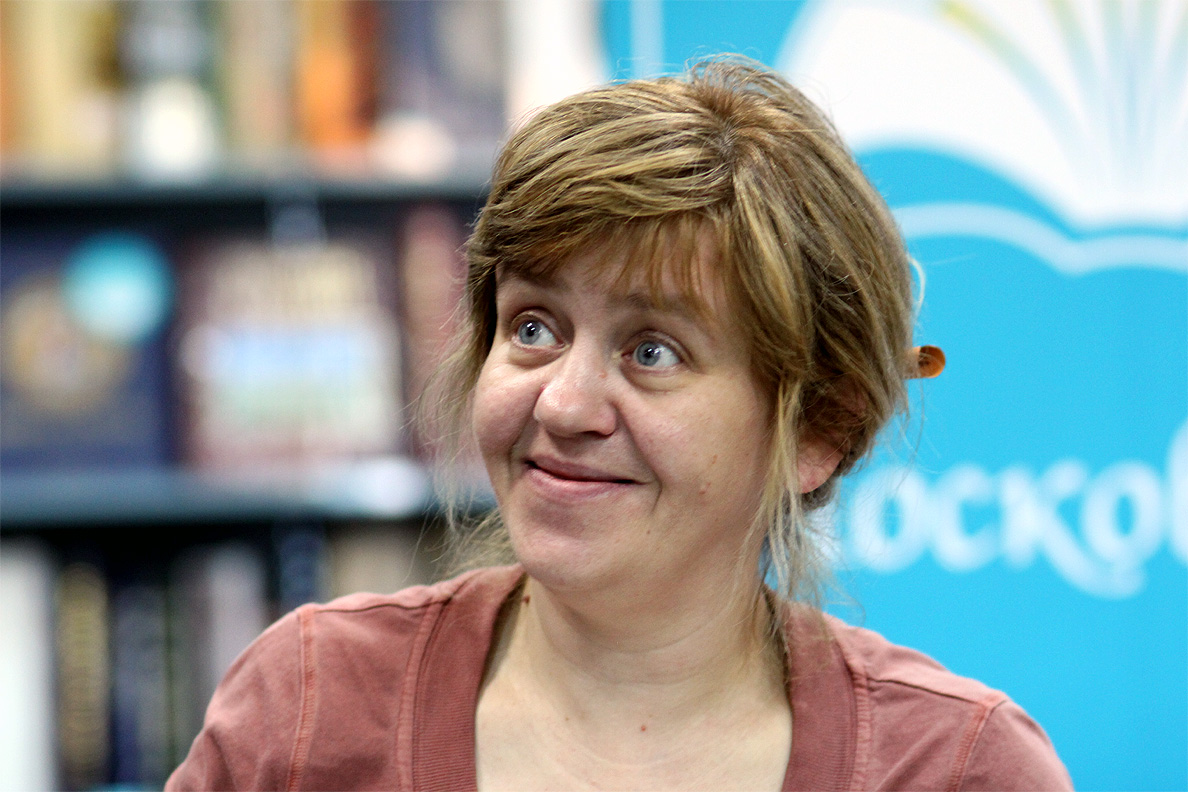
- Max Frei (2010)
- Born: Svetlana Yuryevna Martynchik (Светлана Юрьевна Мартынчик/Світлана Юріївна Мартинчик); 22 February 1965 (age 61); Odesa, Ukrainian SSR
- Spouse: Igor Styopin
- Writing career
- Genre: Fantasy

Max Frei (Russian: Макс Фрай) is the pen name of Svetlana Yuryevna Martynchik (Russian: Светла́на Ю́рьевна Марты́нчик; Ukrainian: Світлана Юріївна Мартинчик) (born 1965 in Odessa, Ukrainian SSR, Soviet Union), a fantasy writer from Odessa, Ukraine. She writes in Russian and mostly publishes in Russia while holding Ukrainian citizenship. She permanently resides in Vilnius, Lithuania. Martynchik has collaborated many years on her books with her spouse, artist Igor Styopin (1967–2018).

== Biography ==
Martynchik has Belarusian and German roots. She studied philology at Odessa State University, but dropped out without graduating. From 1986 she collaborated with artist Igor Styopin, whom she later married. The couple moved to Moscow, Russia, in 1993, to work at Marat Gelman's gallery. There, Svetlana started writing fantasy books.

The pen name, Max Frei, was invented by Martynchik and Styopin for their works on comic fantasy series Labyrinths of Echo ("Лабиринты Eхо"). The plot follows the eponymous narrator, sir Max, as he leaves our "real" world for the phantasmagoric fantasy city of Echo. There, he becomes a member of a special service that controls the use of magic. The books are written by Martynchik, while Styopin developed the Echo universe and illustrated the books. Along with her Echo books, Frei also participated in several literary projects. She compiled Fram, a series of short story anthologies by Amphora publishing house. From 2006 to 2011, the series of books Russian Foreign Folktales ("Русские инородные сказки") was published as part of the Fram project.

The couple moved from Moscow to Vilnius, Lithuania, in 2004, out of their dislike of megalopolises. There, Max Frei wrote four parts of magic realist Tales of the Old Vilnius ("Сказки старого Вильнюса").

== Bibliography ==
=== Cycle of books "Labyrinths of Echo" ===
- Чужак (Stranger, 1996)
- Волонтёры Вечности (Volunteers of Eternity, 1996)
- Простые волшебные вещи (Simple magic things, 1997)
- Тёмная сторона (The Dark Side, 1997)
- Наваждения (Illusions, 1998)
- Власть несбывшегося (Power of Unfulfilled, 1998)
- Болтливый мертвец (A Talkative Dead, 1999)
- Лабиринт Мёнина (Labyrinth of Mönin, 2003)

=== Cycle of books "My Ragnarok" ===
- Гнёзда химер. Хроники Овёттганы. (Nests of chimeras. Chronicles of Ovёtganna (editorial version) (1997))
- Гнёзда химер. Хроники Хугайды (Nests of chimeras. Chronicles of Hugayda (author's version) (1999))
- Мой Рагнарёк (My Ragnarok, 1998)

=== Cycle of books "Chronicles of Echo" ===
- Чуб Земли. История, рассказанная сэром Максом из Ехо (The Earth’s Tuft. The story told by Sir Max from Echo, 2004)
- Туланский детектив. История, рассказанная леди Меламори Блимм (Detective from Tulane. The story told by lady Melamory Blimm, 2004)
- Властелин Морморы. История, рассказанная сэром Джуффином Халли (Lord of the Marmore. The story told by Sir Juffin Hulley, 2005)
- Неуловимый Хабба Хэн. История, рассказанная сэром Максом из Ехо (Elusive Habba Heng. The story told by Sir Max from Echo, 2005)
- Ворона на мосту. История, рассказанная сэром Шурфом Лонли-Локли (Crow on the bridge. The story told by Sir Shurf Lonely - Lockley, 2006)
- Горе господина Гро. История, рассказанная сэром Кофой Йохом (Mr. Gro’s Sorrow. The story told by Sir Cofa Joch, 2007)
- Обжора - хохотун. История, рассказанная сэром Мелифаро (Laughing Glutton. The story told by Sir Melifaro, 2010)
- Дар Шаванахолы. История, рассказанная сэром Максом из Ехо (Gift from Shavanahola. The story told by Sir Max from Echo, 2011)
- Тубурская игра. История, рассказанная сэром Нумминорихом Кутой (Tubur Game. The story told by Sir Numminorih Kuta, 2013)

=== Cycle of books "Dreams of Echo" ===
- Мастер ветров и закатов (The Master of Winds and Sundowns, 2014)
- Слишком много кошмаров (Too Many Nightmares, 2015)
- Вся правда о нас (All Truth About Us, 2015)
- Я иду искать (Coming, ready or not, 2016)
- Сундук мертвеца (Dead Man's Chest, 2017)
- Отдай моё сердце (Give Me My Heart, 2017)
- Мёртвый ноль (Dead Zero, 2018)

=== Other ===
- Encyclopaedia of Myths, 2004)
- A Complaints Book, 2003)
- A book for those who are like Me, 2002)
- An Ideal Novel, 1999)
- A Book of Lonelinesses, 2004) — with Linor Goralik.
- Tales and Stories, 2004)
- Yellow Metal Key, 2009)
- A Big Carriage, 2009)
- The Very Same Book, 2010)
- First line, 2012)
- Second Line, 2012)
- Tales of the Old Vilnius, 2012)
