= John Fry =

John Fry may refer to:

- John Fry (16th century MP), MP for Lyme Regis
- John Fry (regicide) (1609–1657), English member of parliament and a judge at the trial of Charles I
- John Fry (record producer) (1944–2014), founder of Ardent Records
- John Fry, co-founder of Fry's Electronics
- John Fry (cricketer) (born 1961), former English cricketer
- John Wesley Fry (1876–1946), politician in Alberta, Canada and mayor of Edmonton
- John Anderson Fry (born 1960), American academic administrator, currently president of Temple University
- Johnny Fry (1840–1863), first "official" westbound rider of the Pony Express
- John Franklin Fry, character in th TV series Revolution
- John Fry (journalist) (1930–2020), Canadian journalist specialized in outdoor recreation and travel

== See also ==
- Jack Frye (1904–1959), aviation pioneer
