= Robert Fry (disambiguation) =

Robert Fry (born 1951) is a British soldier and businessman.

Robert Fry may also refer to:

- Bob Fry (1930–2019), former American football player
- Bob Fry (golfer) (1922–1993), American golfer

== See also ==
- Robert Frye (disambiguation)
- Robert Fries (1876–1966), Swedish botanist
- Barbara Fry (1922–1997), British daffodil breeder and horticulturist who was also known as 'Bob'
