= Rebecca Fry =

U.S. environmental health scientist and academic administrator

Rebecca C. Fry is a U.S. environmental health scientist and academic administrator. She is the incoming vice dean for academic affairs at the UNC Gillings School of Global Public Health set to begin November 2026. Fry is also the Carol Remmer Angle Distinguished Professor in Children's Environmental Health. She studies how early-life exposure to environmental contaminants like metals and PFAS alters molecular and epigenetic pathways to cause human disease.
