= Paul Fry =

Paul Fry may refer to:

- Paul Fry (professor) (born 1944), American professor of English at Yale University
- Paul Fry (speedway rider) (1964–2010), British motorcycle speedway rider
- Paul Fry (baseball) (born 1992), American baseball player
