= Hugo Frey (musician) =

American composer, pianist, and violinist

Hugo Frey (26 August 1873 – 13 February 1952) was an American pianist, violinist, composer, songwriter, conductor, and arranger. He was a prolific editor for piano sheet music, the primary audience being the "living room" pianist, providing simplified arrangements of some of the more difficult pieces.

In the 1920s he was pianist with The Troubadours and led and arranged for the Manhattan Merrymakers, and was "a prolific piano roll editor".

In 1921 Swiss classical pianist Rudolph Ganz described Frey as "the best of the composers of so-called bad music, and therefore preferable to the bad composers of so-called good music".
