= Fray (surname) =

Fray is a surname. Fray is a surname derived from the German word 'frei' which means 'free'. Ancestry of Fray can be traced to Ashkenazic Jews from Europe. Other variations include Frayr, Frayer, Frayda, Frayman, Frayberg, Frey, Freyr, Freyda, Freyman, Freyberg, Freiman, Freeman.

Notable people with the name include:

- Arron Fray (born 1987), English soccer player
- David Fray (born 1981), French classical pianist
- Derek Fray FRS, British material scientist and professor
- Ian Fray (born 2002), American soccer player
- Sir John Fray (died 1461), English lawyer and court official
- Liam Fray (born 1985), English musician, singer, songwriter and lyricist
- Martin Fray (born 1986), English footballer
- Michael Fray (1947–2019), Jamaican sprinter
- Paula Fray (born 1966), South African journalist, entrepreneur and media trainer
- Terryn Fray (born 1991), Bermudan cricketer
- Tom Fray (born 1979), English cricketer

== In fiction ==
- Melaka Fray, protagonist in the Fray comic book series
- Clary Fray, protagonist in The Mortal Instruments book series and popular Netflix show Shadowhunters by Cassandra Clare

== See also ==
- Freyr
- Frai
- Frej (surname)
- Frey (surname)
