= Don Fry =

Donald George Fry is an Australian engineer, company director, entrepreneur and philanthropist.

== NQEA ==
Fry is the owner and chairman of NQEA, founded by his father in 1948 in Cairns, Queensland as a general engineering company contracting to the mining industry, then diversified. Fry started his apprenticeship as a Fitter and Turner with NQEA.

Under Fry's direction, NQEA later entered the boat building and maintenance industry, and won the contract to build the 14 Australian follow-on 42 m (138 ft) Fremantle class patrol boats for the Royal Australian Navy that entered service in the 1980s, then provided maintenance for the ships. NQEA later built and maintained luxury pleasure boats.

=== Hypersonics ===
The Australian Defence Force Academy in Canberra contracted NQEA to build a complete ground testing hypersonics test chamber to a design developed by him.

In 2004 NQEA built a nozzle for a scramjet (supersonic combustion ramjet engine) to be tested by the University of Queensland ground test facility, the T4 tunnel. Fry has been designated as an adjunct professor of the University's School of Engineering.

== Community involvement ==
Besides his business and scientific interests, Don Fry chairs Australia’s national committee advising the Government of Australia on homelessness.

He is chair of the James Cook University Engineering Advisory Board.

Fry is a recipient of Engineers Australia highest National award. He was the inaugural recipient of the Queensland Division Hall of Fame.

Fry has also been inducted into the Queensland University of Technology Hall of Fame for Outstanding Constructors.

He is Patron of the FNQ Independent Living Support Association, a longtime board member of Lifeline Cairns, and has been for 30 years member of the Cairns Salvation Army Advisory Board.

In 2006, he was appointed a special trustee for ensuring the allocation of funds under the federal government's Cyclone Larry assistance package.

== Awards and recognition ==
- 1998 – appointed Officer of the Order of Australia (AO) in the 1998 Australia Day Honours for "service to engineering, in particular, marine engineering in the areas of design and construction, and to the community".
- 2006 – named among the Top 100 Australia's Most Influential Engineers
