= Frej (given name) =

Frej is a Scandinavian masculine given name, derived from Freyr. Notable people with the name include:

- Frej Larsson (born 1983), Swedish musician and rapper
- Frej Liewendahl (1902–1966), Finnish middle-distance runner
- Frej Lindqvist (born 1937), Swedish actor
- Frej Ossiannilsson (1905–1995), Swedish entomologist
