= Fray =

Fray or Frays or The Fray may refer to:

== Arts, entertainment, and media ==
=== Fictional entities ===
- Fray, a phenomenon in Terry Pratchett's The Carpet People
- Fray, the main character in the video games:
  - Fray in Magical Adventure
  - Fray CD
- Melaka Fray, the title character of the comic book series Fray

=== Music ===
Albums

- The Fray (album), a 2009 self-titled album by The Fray

Groups

- The Fray, an American rock band
- Race the Fray, an Australian rock band, originally known as "The Fray"

Songs

- "Fray", a song from the album 14 Shades of Grey by Staind

=== Other arts, entertainment, and media ===
- Fray (comics), a comic book series by Joss Whedon
- Fray (film), a 2012 film

== People ==
- Fray (surname)

== Places ==
- Frays River in London

== Other uses ==
- Fray, a Spanish-language title for a friar

== See also ==
- Affray, public order offence
- Frey (disambiguation)
