= Peter Macchiarini =

American sculptor

- Born: August 27, 1909; Santa Rosa, California, U.S.
- Died: July 3, 2001 (aged 91); California, U.S.
- Education: Accademia di Belle Arti di Carrara
- Known for: jewelry
- Children: 3

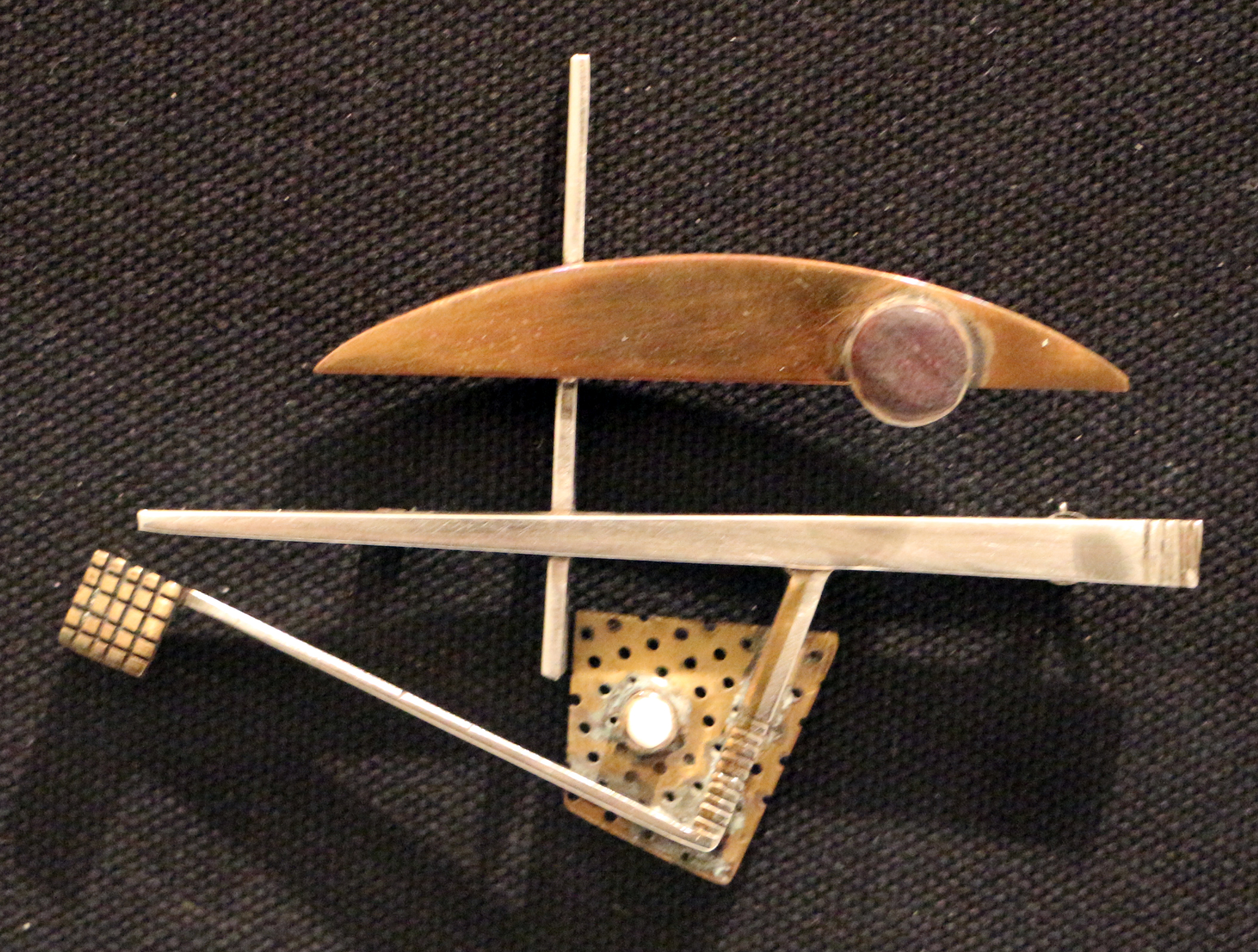
Brooch, 1960 ca.

Peter Macchiarini (August 27, 1909 – July 3, 2001) was an American Modernist jeweler and sculptor, who was a pioneer in the field of avant-garde jewelry. He maintained an art studio and shop on Grant Avenue in San Francisco, California, for more than 50 years. He was instrumental in organizing the first San Francisco outdoor art festival in 1938 as well as founding the Upper Grant Avenue Street Fair in 1954, an event that spawned similar artist-run festivals in the San Francisco Bay Area.

== Biography ==
Macchiarini was born in Santa Rosa, California, on the Wohler Ranch in Sonoma County, on August 27, 1909. In 1923, when he was age thirteen, he and his family moved to the northwestern region of Italy, where he went on to study for four years at the Art Academy in Pietrasanta.

Macchiarini returned to the United States in 1928 and, with the arrival of the Great Depression worked from 1929 to 1935 as a stone carver, with several Bay Area firms; some of which were funded by the Federal Arts Project of the Works Progress Administration (WPA). While employed as a stone carver, he worked on projects in the 1930s with such sculptors as Beniamino Bufano and Ralph Stackpole. Like Bufano, Stackpole, and many other Bay Area artists, Macchiarini was active on the political left. At a student demonstration during the 1934 West Coast waterfront strike, he was severely beaten by San Francisco police officers.

In 1936, following the suggestion of jeweler and artist Margaret De Patta, he started to create art jewelry and began his own jewelry studio. After studying art at the California School of Fine Art (now known as the San Francisco Art Institute) he went on to teach metalsmithing and jewelry making at Mills College during the summer sessions from 1952 to 1955 as well as, in the same period, in his own studio.

In 1954, he helped co-found the Upper Grant Street Festival, which later became the North Beach Festival, a local artisan street fair and sale.

In 1980, he was awarded a gold medal from the Association of the Lucchesi nel Mondo, which annually recognizes those who, as citizens abroad, bring honor to the Italian province of Lucca through personal merit.

In 1999, the 90 year old Macchiarini was subject to an Ellis Act eviction of his apartment in North Beach. In 2000, the San Francisco Board of Supervisors renamed a portion of Kearny Street – near Telegraph Hill – "The Peter Macchiarini Steps" in his honor.

== Death and legacy ==
On June 29, 2001, he was declared an official "San Francisco Legend" for his contributions to the local culture. A few days later on July 3, 2001, Peter Macchiarini died of pneumonia at the age of 91.

As of 2001, his son, Daniel Macchiarini owns, Macchiarini Creative Design and Gallery on Grant Street in San Francisco, nearby where his father Peter had his studio and his granddaughter Emma also works there.
