= Frye =

Frye is a surname. Notable people with the surname include:

- Channing Frye (born 1983), American basketball player
- Charlie Frye (born 1981), American football player for the Oakland Raiders
- Don Frye (born 1965), American mixed martial arts fighter
- Donna Frye (born 1952), San Diego city councilwoman
- Dwight Frye (1899–1943), American actor
- George Frederick Frye (1833–1912), Seattle pioneer and the City Council member
- Henry Frye (born 1932), American politician and judge, first black chief justice of North Carolina Supreme Court
- Jack Frye (1904–1959), American aviation pioneer
- John Frye (1933–2005), Scottish footballer
- Joseph Frye (1712–1794), colonial American soldier and general
- Kelly Frye (born 1984), American actress
- Marilyn Frye (born 1941), American philosophy professor and feminist theorist
- Northrop Frye (1912–1991), Canadian literary critic
- Richard N. Frye (1920–2014), American scholar of Iranian history
- Sean Frye (born 1966), American child actor
- Shirley M. Frye, American mathematics educator
- Soleil Moon Frye (born 1976), American actress best known for playing Punky Brewster
- Spencer Frye (born 1967), American politician
- Taylor Frye (1864–1946), American politician and educator
- Theodore Christian Frye (1869–1962), American botanist
- Thomas Frye (c. 1710–1762), Anglo-Irish painter
- Thomas Frye (Rhode Island politician) (1666–1748), Deputy Governor of colony of Rhode Island
- Virgil Frye (1930–2012), American actor
- Walter Frye (died 1474), English Renaissance composer
- William P. Frye (1830–1911), U.S. Senator from Maine

== See also ==
- The Frye Company, a bootmaker
- Frye Computer Systems, a software company
- Frye (Splatoon), a member of Deep Cut in Splatoon 3 and Splatoon Raiders
- Frye standard, a test to determine the admissibility of scientific evidence in United States courts
- Fry (disambiguation)
- Frye Island, Maine, named for Joseph Frye
- Fryeburg, Maine, named for Joseph Frye
