= Margaret De Patta =

American jewelry designer and educator (1903–1964)

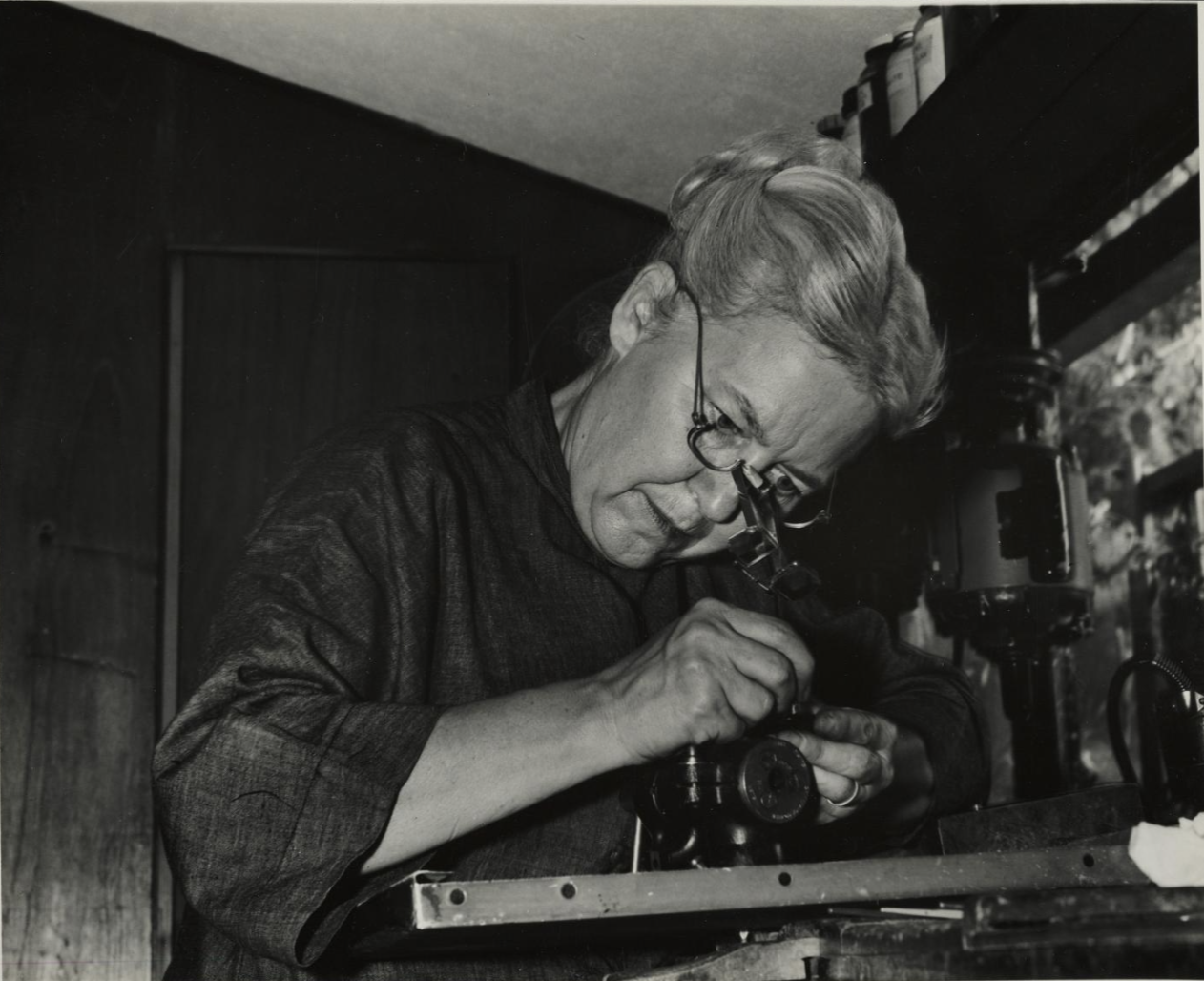
- De Patta, c. 1960
- Born: Margaret Strong; 1903; Tacoma, Washington, US
- Died: 1964 (aged 60–61); San Francisco, California, US
- Other names: Margaret Strong De Patta, Margaret De Patta Bielawski
- Education: Art Students League of New York, IIT Institute of Design
- Known for: jewelry design
- Movement: Architectonic jewellery
- Spouse(s): Samuel De Patta (m.1929–1941, divorce), Eugene Bielawski (m. 1946–1964, death)

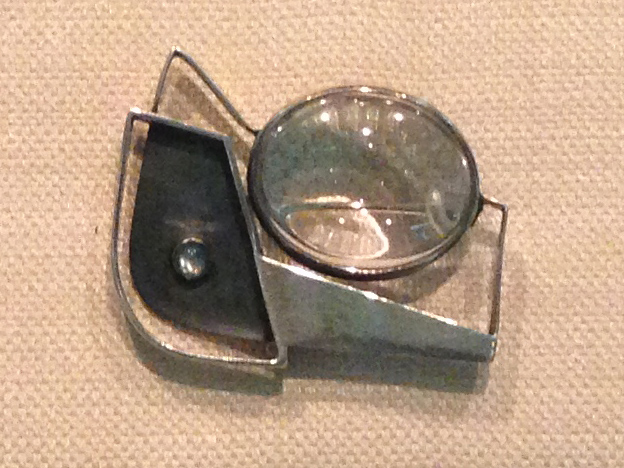
Brooch designed by Margaret De Patta, circa 1950

Margaret De Patta (née Strong; 1903–1964) was an American jewelry designer and educator, active in the mid-century jewelry movement.

== Early life and education ==
She was born in 1903 in Tacoma, Washington, and grew up in San Diego, California, the eldest of three daughters born to Hal and Mary Strong.

De Patta attended the San Diego Academy of Fine Arts from 1921 until 1923. Then from 1923 to 1925 she attended the San Francisco Art Institute (formally known as California School of Fine Arts) and studied sculpture and painting. From 1926 until 1929, De Patta received a scholarship to attend the Art Students League of New York, where she encountered the work of the European avant-garde.

She later returned to San Francisco and apprenticed with Armin Hairenian at the Art Copper Shop, as well as taught herself the art of jewelry-making.

== Career ==
Her innovative jewelry was influenced by the "Bauhaus school, constructivism, and democratic ideals". She married Sam De Patta in 1929. De Patta first began experimenting with jewelry in 1929 when she made her own wedding ring. She was known for her innovative use of visual effects in her jewelry, such as light refraction, image reflection, and magnification, which she achieved through the design of her stones with the help of Francis Sperisen, a lapidary in San Francisco . She called her stones "opticuts". De Patta took inspiration from "Egyptian, Turkish, Etruscan, and Mayan jewelry" when creating her pieces.

Her jewelry was featured in the 1939 Golden Gate International Exposition (GGIE) in San Francisco. For many years she lived in a house on Laidley Street house in Glen Park, which was extensively remodeled after 1940s.

In 1941, she studied under László Moholy-Nagy at the IIT Institute of Design (formally known as the School of Design) in Chicago, Illinois. She met her second husband, industrial designer Eugene "Gene" Bielawski at IIT Institute, they were married in 1946. In the 1940s she taught trade school classes in San Francisco with Bielawski however they were blacklisted from their work for "Communist leanings". She struggled alongside Bielawski after they set up a Napa-based studio, to start a reasonably priced mass-produced jewelry line for the public.

In 1951, De Patta led the founding of the Metal Arts Guild of San Francisco, she also served as the first president. De Patta taught art classes at the California Labor School, and silversmithing, forging and lost-wax casting at the College of Marin. One of her students was Irena Brynner.

== Death and legacy ==
She died in 1964 in a hotel room in San Francisco, from a suicide. She had left notes bequeathing all of her major works before she died.

After Bielawski's death in 2002, much of De Patta's work and materials were donated to the Oakland Museum of California. Her work is collected in many major museums including the Smithsonian American Art Museum, the Los Angeles County Museum of Art, among others.

In 2012, the Museum of Arts and Design and the Oakland Museum of California co-organized the first major retrospective of her work titled Space-Light-Structure: The Jewelry of Margaret De Patta, and curated by Ursula Ilse-Neuman and Julie M. Muñiz. This exhibition included more than 60 pieces of jewelry, ceramics, flatware, photographs, and pictograms.

In 1999, her abstract photography work was included in a group exhibition, The Photogram 1918–1948, at Ubu Gallery, New York City. The Velvet da Vinci gallery in San Francisco held an exhibition of her jewelry in 2012, The De Patta Project: New Jewelry Made With Old Stones Acquired from the Estate of Margaret De Patta (1903–1964).
