= Byron August Wilson =

American artist

Byron Wilson
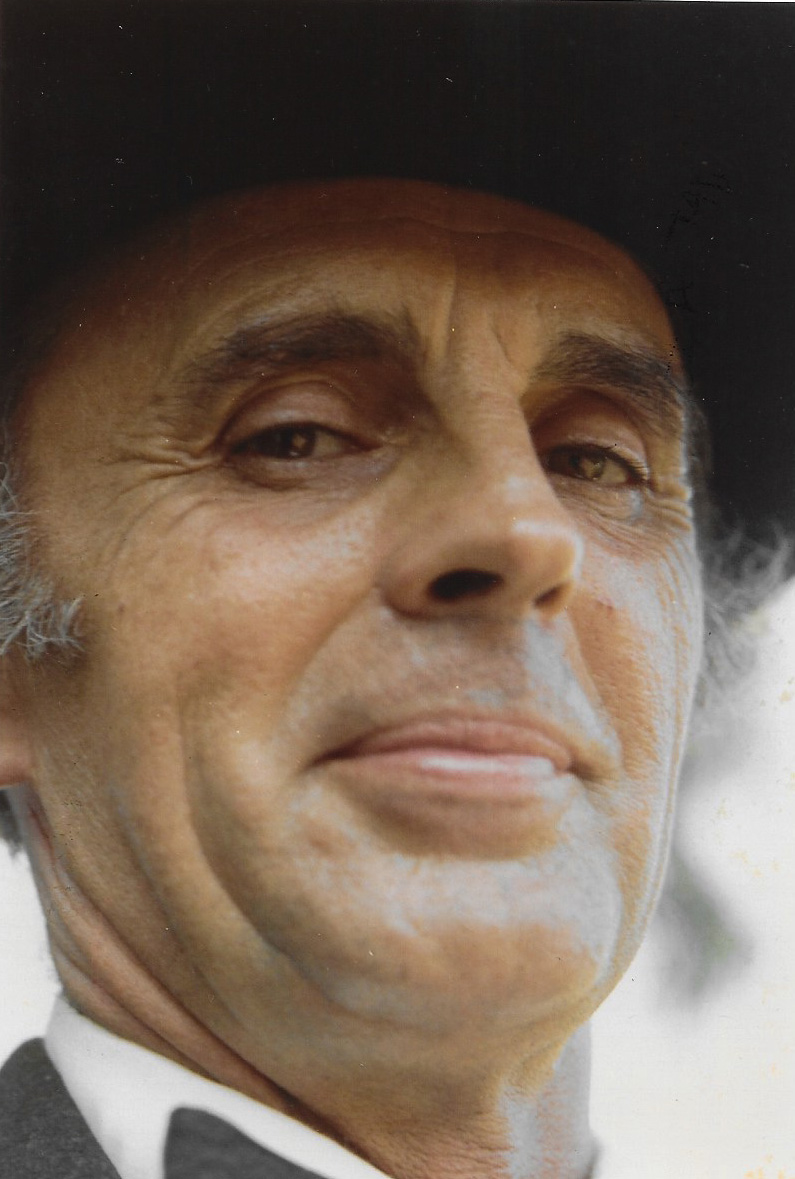
- Born: July 6, 1918; Alameda, California, U.S.
- Died: June 15, 1992; Duncans Mills, California, U.S.
- Known for: Jewelry, metalworking

Byron August Wilson (1918–1992) was an American mid-20th century artist and educator, known for his jewelry design.

== Life ==
Wilson was born in Alameda, California. Although self-taught, he gained recognition for his jewelry design and art during the California studio jewelry movement in the 1950s, 60s, and 70s.

In 1951, Wilson was one of the founding member of the Metal Arts Guild of San Francisco. Margaret De Patta, another founding member, had an influence on his work. In 1956, the California College of Arts and Crafts (CCAC) hired him to teach in the metal arts department, where he worked for 26 years. With the help of students, he established CCAC's first metal foundry. During this period, he also worked as a claims inspector for the Southern Pacific Railroad.

Wilson's art incorporated geometric shapes formed from materials such as ebony wood and ivory. He also made use of unconventional casting methods to create his metal pieces.

In 1981, Byron Wilson filed a patent for an improved type of flap sander (pat. no. 4,365,448). The tool consisted of a slotted cylinder and cover plate that held replaceable strips of sandpaper.

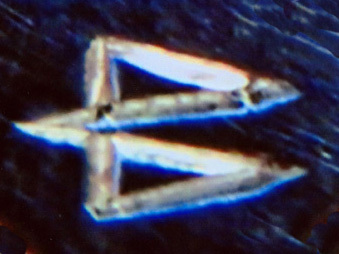
Artist hallmark found on some of Byron Wilson's jewelry pieces.

Byron Wilson died in 1992.

The Los Angeles County Museum of Art (LACMA) has an extensive collection of Byron Wilson's pieces.

The Museum of Fine Arts in Boston (MFA) has one example of Wilson's work in their collection.

== Honors and awards ==
- 1952 First prize, "Pacifica," Oakland, California
- 1952 First prize and honorable mention, San Francisco Art Festival
- 1955 Art Commission Purchase Award, San Francisco Art Festival
- 1955 Honorable mention, Richmond Annual Exhibition of Watercolor, Graphic and Decorative Arts
- 1955 First prize and special award, Lafayette Art Show
- 1955 Honorable mention, "Fiber, Clay and Metal," St. Paul Art Gallery
- 1955 First prize, California State Fair
- 1957 Purchase award and honorable mention, "American Jewelry and Related Objects," Memorial Art Gallery, University of Rochester
- 1957 Award of merit, "Designer Craftsmen of the West," de Young Museum, San Francisco
- 1981 Honorable mention, California State Fair

== Selected exhibitions ==
- 1951, 1952, 1954, 1955, 1956, 1957, 1968, 1969, 1973, 1974 and 1975 San Francisco Art Festivals, San Francisco, California
- 1952–1953 Traveling Exhibit of California Craftsmen, American Federation of Art
- 1953, 1954, 1956, 1957, 1958, 1966, 1969 Richmond Annual Exhibition of watercolor, graphic and decorative arts, Richmond, California
- 1953 and 1955 "Fiber, Clay and Metal," St. Paul Art Gallery, St. Paul, Minnesota
- 1955 "84 Contemporary Jewelers," Walker Art Center, Minneapolis, MN
- 1957 "American Jewelry and Related Objects," Memorial Art Gallery, University of Rochester, Rochester, New York
- 1956 Inaugural exhibition, Museum of Contemporary Crafts, New York City
- 1956 and 1957 "Craftsmanship in a Changing world," Smithsonian Institution, Washington, DC, traveling exhibition
- 1971 "The Metal Experience," Oakland Museum, Oakland, California
