= Art jewelry =

Type of jewelry

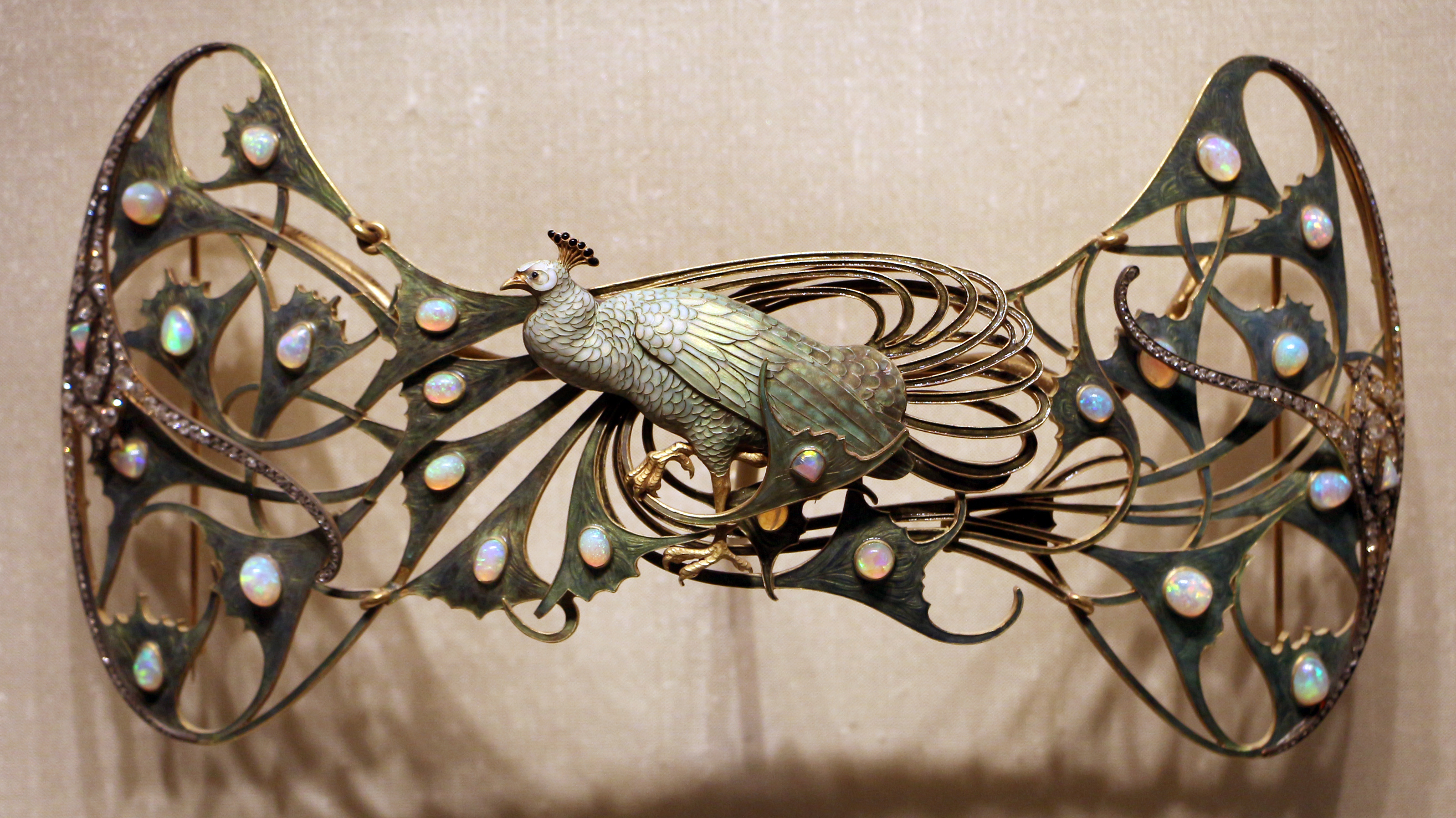
Breastplate with a peacock by René Lalique, c. 1898–1900; gold, enamels, opals and diamonds; Calouste Gulbenkian Museum (Lisbon, Portugal)

Art jewelry is one of the names given to jewelry created by studio craftspeople in recent decades. As the name suggests, art jewelry emphasizes creative expression and design, and is characterized by the use of a variety of materials, often commonplace or of low economic value. In this sense, it forms a counterbalance to the use of "precious materials" (such as gold, silver and gemstones) in conventional or fine jewelry, where the value of the object is tied to the value of the materials from which it is made. Art jewelry is related to studio craft in other media such as glass, wood, plastics and clay; it shares beliefs and values, education and training, circumstances of production, and networks of distribution and publicity with the wider field of studio craft. Art jewelry also has links to fine art and design.

While the history of modern art jewelry usually begins with modernist jewelry in the United States in the 1940s, followed by the artistic experiments of German goldsmiths in the 1950s, a number of the values and beliefs that inform art jewelry can be found in the arts and crafts movement of the late nineteenth century. Many regions, such as North America, Europe, Australasia and parts of Asia have flourishing art jewelry scenes, while other places such as South America and Africa have been developing the infrastructure of teaching institutions, dealer galleries, writers, collectors and museums that sustain art jewelry.

== Terminology ==
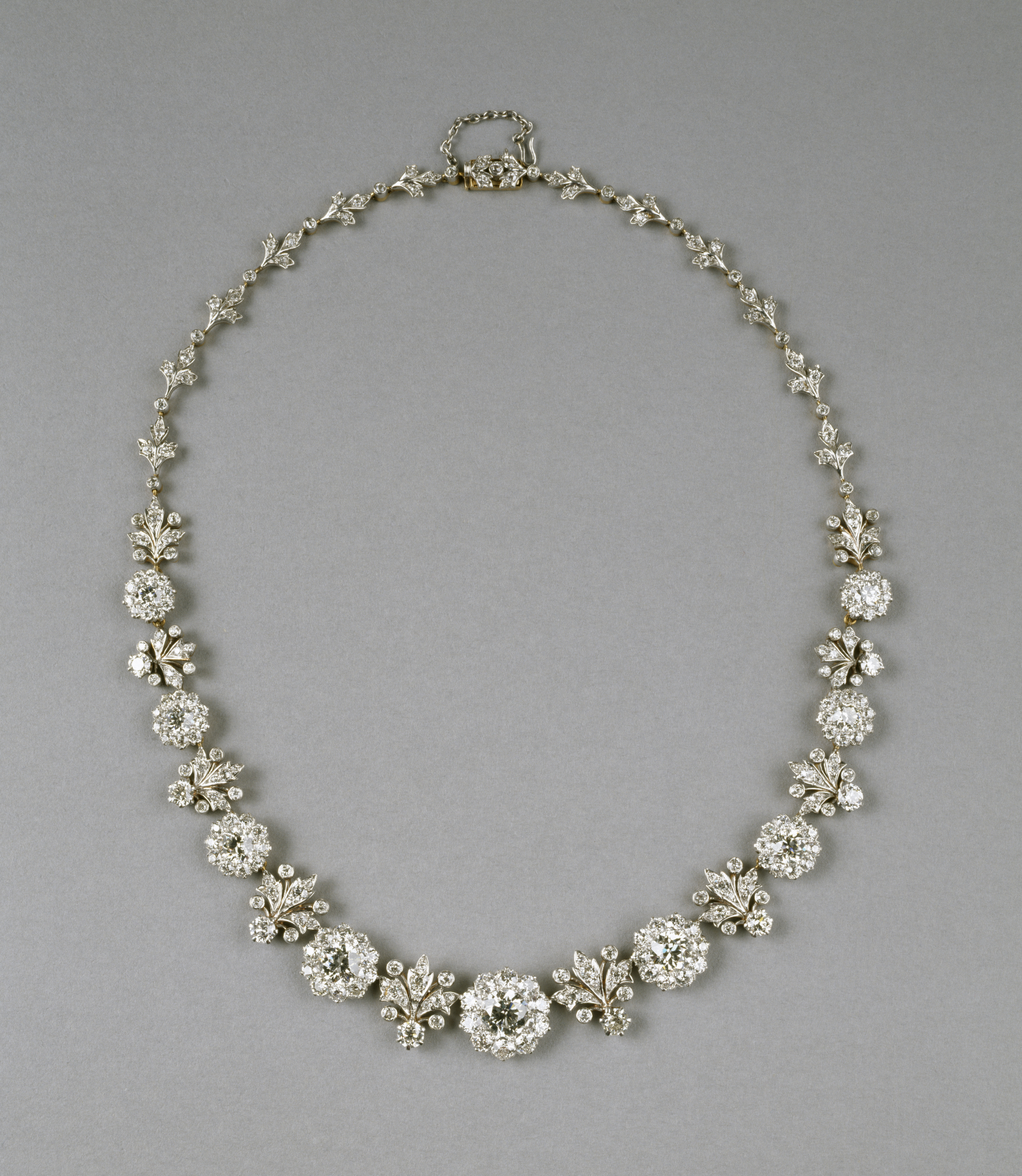
Diamond necklace, c. 1904. An example of Tiffany & Co.'s jewelry around the turn of the 20th century.

Art historian Liesbeth den Besten has identified six different terms to name art jewelry, including contemporary, studio, art, research, design, and author, with the three most common being contemporary, studio, and art. Curator Kelly L'Ecuyer has defined studio jewelry as an offshoot of the studio craft movement, adding that it does not refer to particular artistic styles but rather to the circumstances in which the object is produced. According to her definition, "Studio jewelers are independent artists who handle their chosen materials directly to make one-of-a-kind or limited production jewelry..... The studio jeweler is both the designer and fabricator of each piece (although assistants or apprentices may help with technical tasks), and the work is created in a small, private studio, not a factory." Art historian Monica Gaspar has explored the temporal meaning of the different names given to art jewelry over the past 40 years. She suggests that "avant-garde" jewelry positions itself as radically ahead of mainstream ideas; "modern" or "modernist" jewelry claims to reflect the spirit of the times in which it was made; "studio" jewelry emphasizes the artist studio over the craft workshop; "new" jewelry assumes an ironic stance towards the past; and "contemporary" jewelry claims the present and the "here and now" in contrast with traditional jewelry's eternal nature as an heirloom passing between generations.

The art historian Maribel Koniger argues that the names given to art jewelry are important in order to distinguish this type of jewelry from related objects and practices. The use of the term "conceptual" jewelry is, in her words, an "attempt to detach oneself through terminology from the products of the commercial jewellery industry that reproduce cliches and are oriented towards the tastes of mass consumption on the one hand, and, on the other, the individualistic, subjectively aestheticising designs of pure craft."

== Critique of preciousness ==
Art jewelers often work in a critical or conscious way with the history of jewelry, or to the relationship between jewelry and the body, and they question concepts like "preciousness" or "wearability" that are usually accepted without question by conventional or fine jewelry. This quality is a product of the critique of preciousness, or the challenge of art jewelers in the United States and Europe to the idea that jewelry's value was equivalent to the preciousness of its materials. Initially, art jewelers worked in precious or semi-precious materials, but emphasized artistic expression as the most important quality of their work, linking their jewelry to modernist art movements such as biomorphism, primitivism and tachisme. In the 1960s, art jewelers began to introduce new, alternative materials into their work, such as aluminium and acrylics, breaking with the historical role of jewelry as a sign of status and economic value or portable wealth. As the focus on value gave way, other themes took its place as the subject of jewelry. Writing in 1995, Peter Dormer described the effects of the critique of preciousness as follows: "First, the monetary value of the material becomes irrelevant; second, once the value of jewelry as a status symbol had been deflated, the relation between the ornament and the human body once again assumed a dominant position - jewelry became body-conscious; third, jewelry lost its exclusiveness to one sex or age - it could be worn by men, women and children."

== History ==
=== Arts and Crafts and Art Nouveau jewelry ===
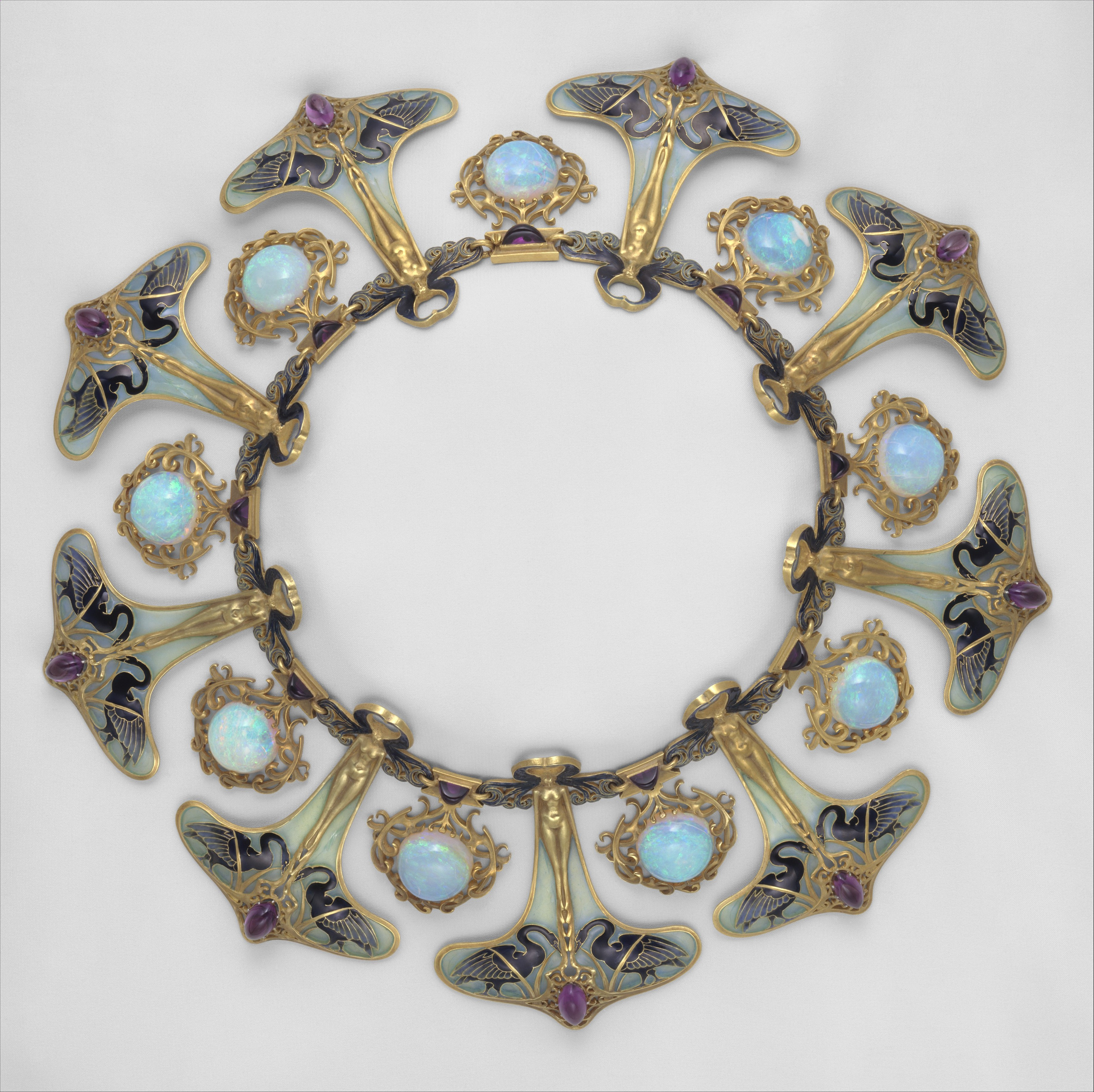
Necklace by René Lalique, 1897–1899; gold, enamel, opals and amethysts; overall diameter: 24.1 centimetres (9.5 in); Metropolitan Museum of Art (New York City)

The art jewelry that emerged in the first years of the twentieth century was a reaction to Victorian taste, and the heavy and ornate jewelry, often machine manufactured, that was popular in the nineteenth century. According to Elyse Zorn Karlin, "For most jewelers, art jewelry was a personal artistic quest as well as a search for a new national identity. Based on a combination of historical references, reactions to regional and world events, newly available materials and other factors, art jewelry reflected a country's identity while at the same time being part of a larger international movement of design reform." Initially art jewelry appealed to a select group of clients with artistic taste, but it was quickly picked up by commercial firms, making it widely available.

There are many different movements that contributed to the category of art jewelry as we know it today. As part of the English Arts and Crafts movement, flourishing between 1860 and 1920, Charles Robert Ashbee and his Guild and School of Handicraft produced the earliest arts and crafts jewelry in a guild setting. Presenting their work as an antidote to industrial production, the first generation of arts and crafts jewelers believed that an object should be designed and made by the same person, although their lack of specialist training meant that much of this jewelry has an appealing handmade quality. Responding to changes in fashion, as well as the Victorian taste for wearing sets, arts and crafts jewelers made pendants, necklaces, brooches, belt buckles, cloak clasps and hair combs that were worn solo. Arts and crafts jewelry also tended to favor materials with little intrinsic value that could be used for their artistic effects. Base metals, semi-precious stones like opals, moonstones and turquoise, misshapen pearls, glass and shell, and the plentiful use of Vitreous enamel, allowed jewelers to be creative and to produce affordable objects. In addition to Charles Robert Ashbee, other significant figures in the movement included William Morris, whose design philosophy emphasized a return to traditional craftsmanship, and John Ruskin, whose writings promoted the rejection of industrialization in decorative arts. Scottish architect Charles Rennie Mackintosh contributed to Arts & Crafts aesthetics by incorporating stylized floral and geometric motifs into jewelry and metalwork. T. J. Cobden-Sanderson, who first coined the term ‘Arts & Crafts’ in 1887, played a crucial role in spreading its ideals. Additionally, Henry Cole, Owen Jones, Matthew Digby Wyatt, and Richard Redgrave helped establish the foundation for the movement by advocating for thoughtful design and high-quality craftsmanship.

Art Nouveau jewelry from France and Belgium was also an important contributor to art jewelry. Worn by wealthy and artistically-literate clients, including courtesans of the Paris demimonde, Art Nouveau jewelry by René Lalique and Alphonse Mucha was inspired by symbolist art, literature and music, and a revival of the curvilinear and dramatic forms of the rococo period. As Elyse Zorn Karlin suggests, "The result was jewels of staggering beauty and imagination, sensual, sexual and beguiling, and at times even frightening. These jewels were a far cry from the symmetrical and somewhat placid designs of Arts and Crafts jewelry, which more closely resembled Renaissance jewels." Lalique and other art nouveau jewelers quite often mixed precious metals and gemstones with inexpensive materials, and favored plique-a-jour and cabochon enamel techniques.

Other important centers of art jewelry production included the Wiener Werkstatte in Vienna, where the architects Josef Hoffmann and Koloman Moser designed jewelry in silver and semi-precious stones, sometimes to be worn with clothing also created by the workshop. The Danish Skønvirke (aesthetic work) movement, of which Georg Jensen is the most famous example, favored silver and native Scandinavian stones and an aesthetic that falls somewhere between the tenets of art nouveau and arts and crafts. Art jewelry in Finland was characterized by a Viking revival, coinciding with its political freedom on Sweden in 1905, while modernisme in Spain followed the lead of art nouveau jewelers. Art jewelry was also practiced in Italy, Russia and the Netherlands.

In the United States, arts and crafts jewelry was popular with amateurs, since unlike ceramics, furniture or textiles, it required only a modest investment in tools, and could be made in the kitchen. One of the first American arts and crafts jewelers, Madeline Yale Wynne, was self-taught and approached her jewelry as form and composition with the emphasis on aesthetic qualities rather than skill, stating that "I consider each effort by itself as regards color and form much as I would paint a picture." Brainerd Bliss Thresher, another American arts and crafts jeweler, used materials like carved horn and amethyst for their aesthetic qualities, following the example of René Lalique who mixed quotidian and precious materials in his jewelry. As Janet Koplos and Bruce Metcalf suggest, whereas the British Arts and Crafts movement tried to reunite art and labor, many upper-class Americans like Thresher united art and leisure: "The practice of craft as a recreation could be a relief from the pressure of a difficult job, a demonstration of one's good taste and savor vivre, a polite manifestation of progressive politics, or an expression of the sheer pleasure of satisfying labor." Several other American jewelers made significant contributions to the Arts and Crafts movement. Marie Zimmermann, a highly versatile metalsmith, blended influences from Egyptian, Greek, and Asian art in her jewelry designs. Florence Koehler, a founding member of the Chicago Arts and Crafts Society, taught jewelry and metalsmithing and incorporated Renaissance influences into her designs after studying jewelry and enamelwork in London. Janet Payne Bowles, a jewelry designer and educator, contributed to the advancement of handcrafted jewelry and metalsmithing through her international exhibitions and decades-long teaching career.

Art jewelry fell out of style in the 1920s and 30s, overshadowed by Art Deco, as well as audience response to its functional and aesthetically challenging nature (too fragile and outrageous). However, it marks a significant break with what came before, and laid down many of the values and attitudes for later twentieth century ideals of art or studio jewelry. As Elyse Zorn Karlin writes, "Art jewelry valued the handmade and prized innovative thinking and creative expression. These jewelers were the first to use materials that did not have the intrinsic value expected in jewelry, and they rejected mainstream jewelry tastes. They thought of their work as an artistic pursuit and made it for a small audience that shared their aesthetic and conceptual values."

Dragonfly Lady brooch by René Lalique, made of gold, enamel, chrysoprase, moonstone, and diamonds (1897–98)

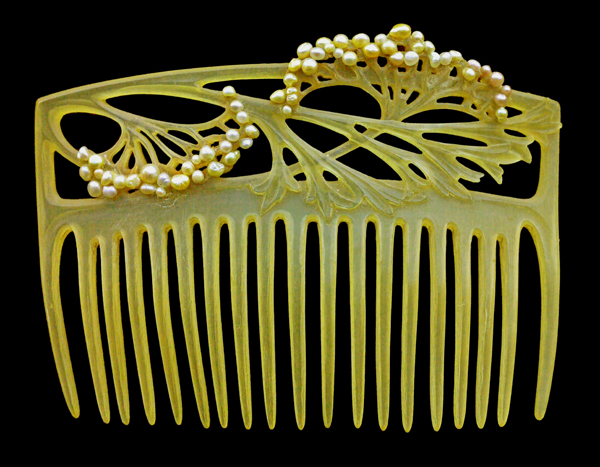
Carved horn decorated with pearls, by Louis Aucoc (c. 1900)

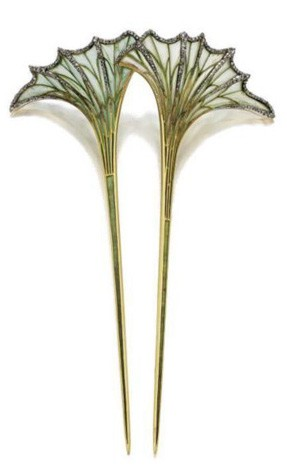
Translucent enamel flowers with small diamonds in the veins, by Aucoc (c. 1900)

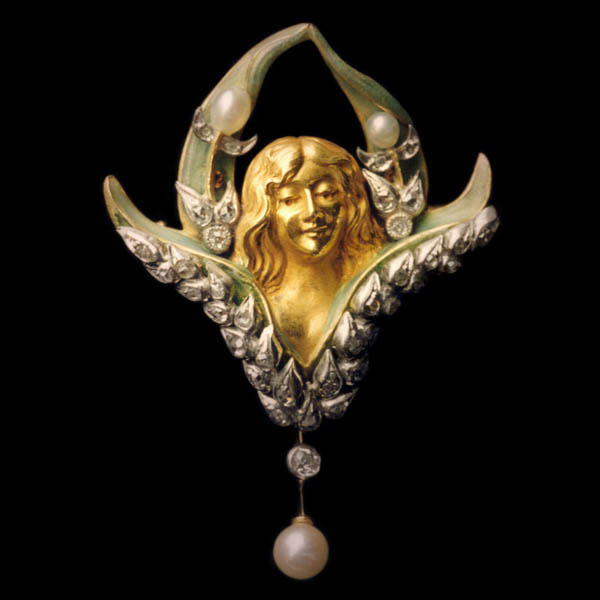
Flora brooch by Aucoc (c. 1900)

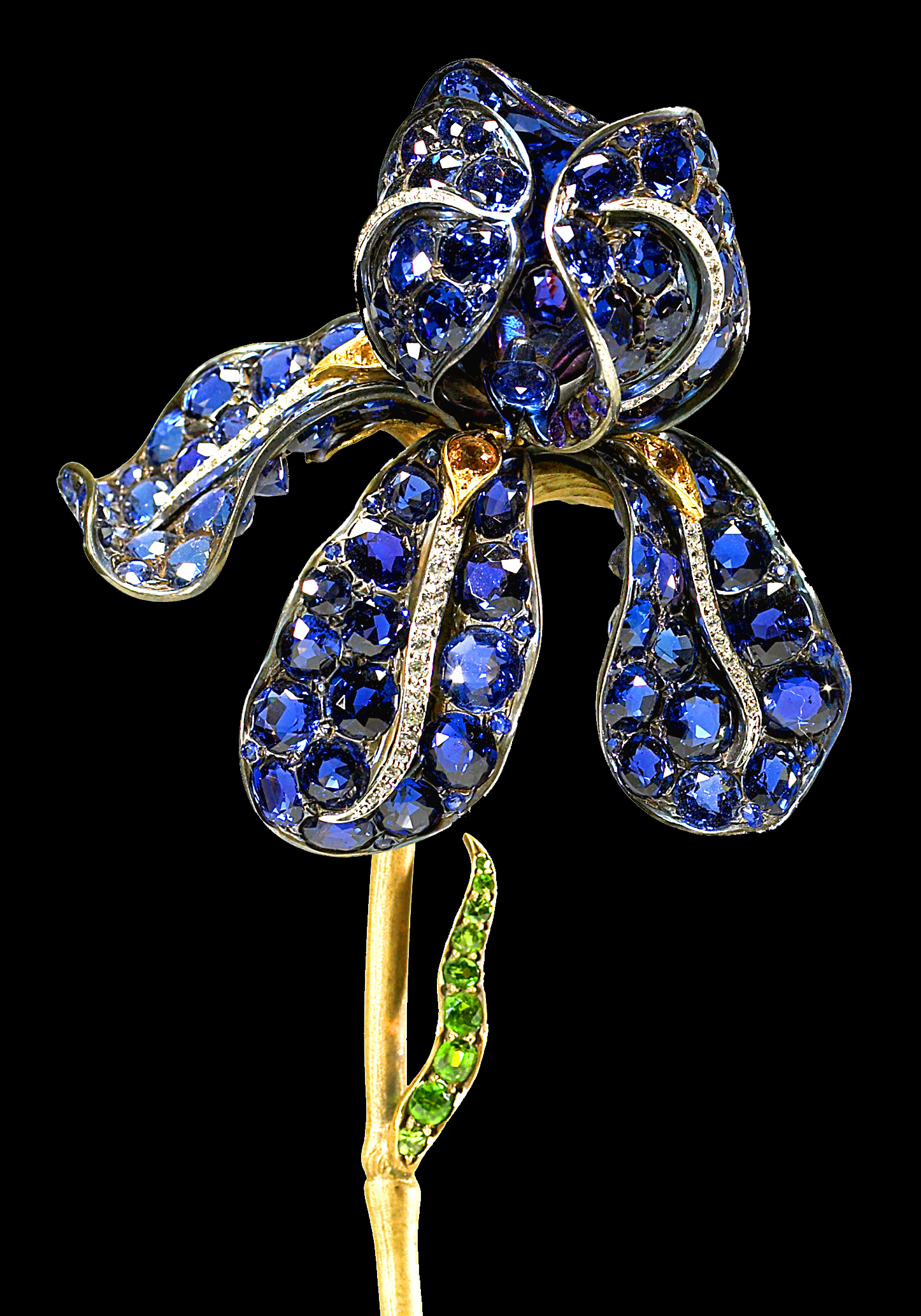
A corsage ornament by Philippe Wolfers (1900)

Brooch with woman by Lalique

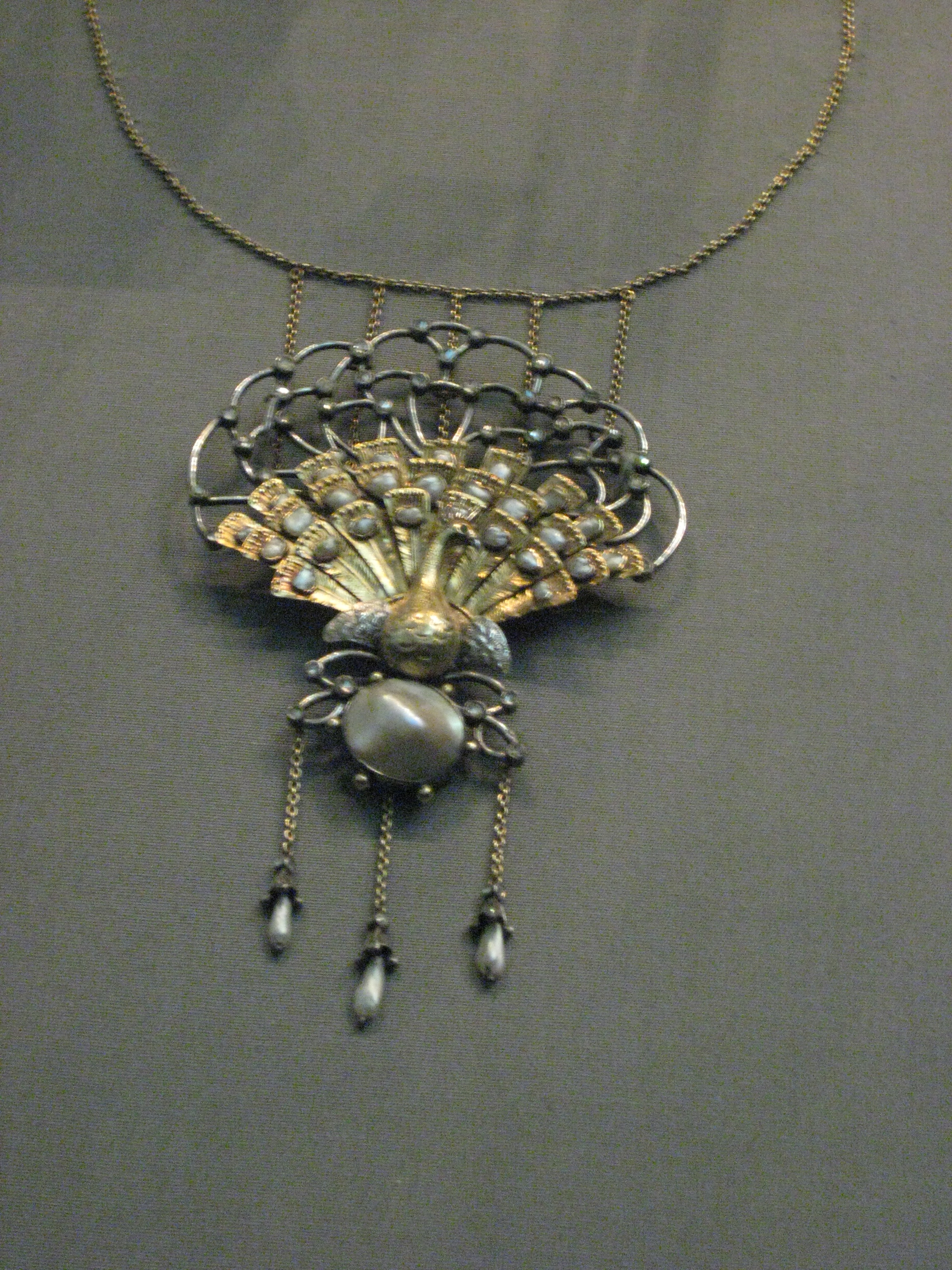
Necklace by Charles Robert Ashbee (1901)

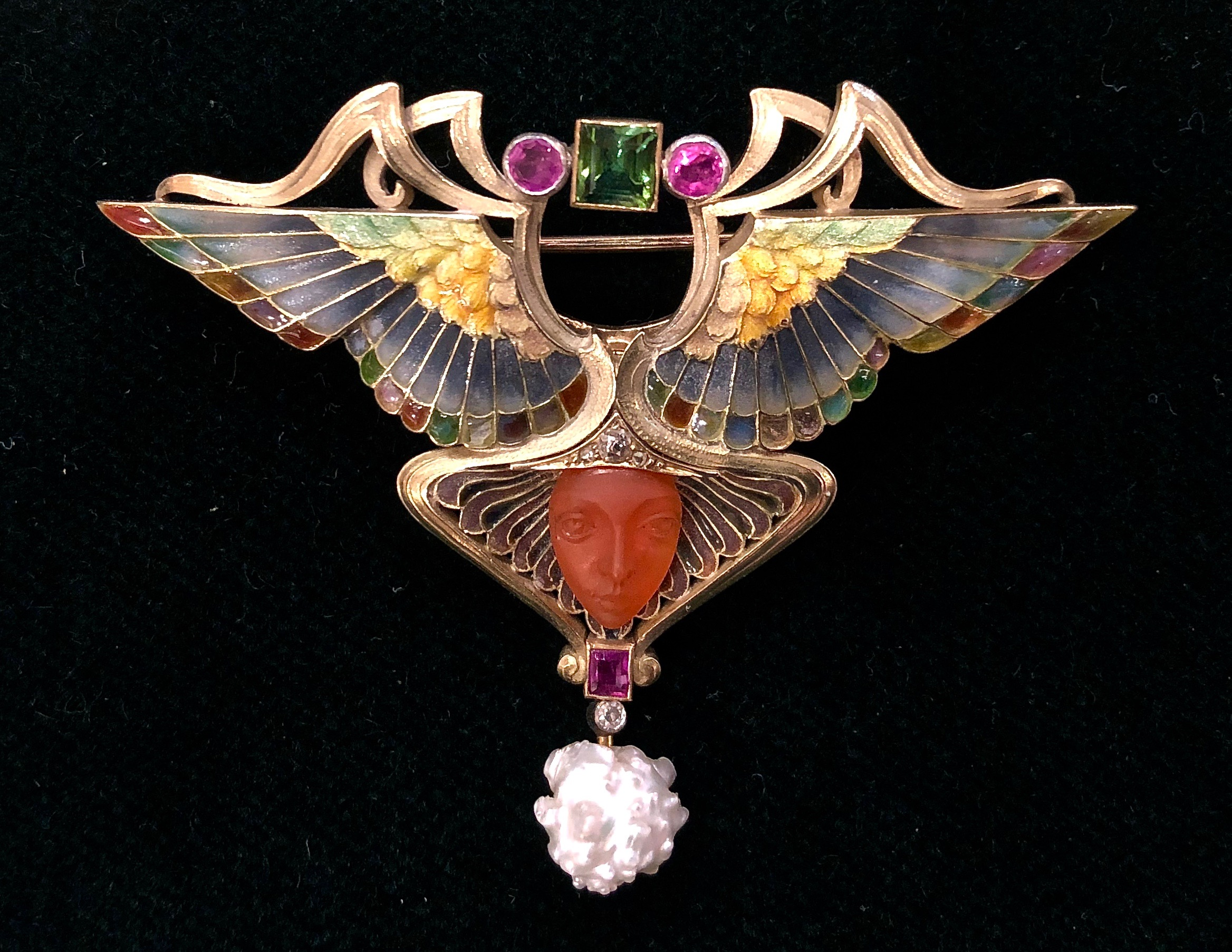
Niké brooch by Wolfers (1902), collection King Baudouin Foundation, depot: KMKG-MRAH

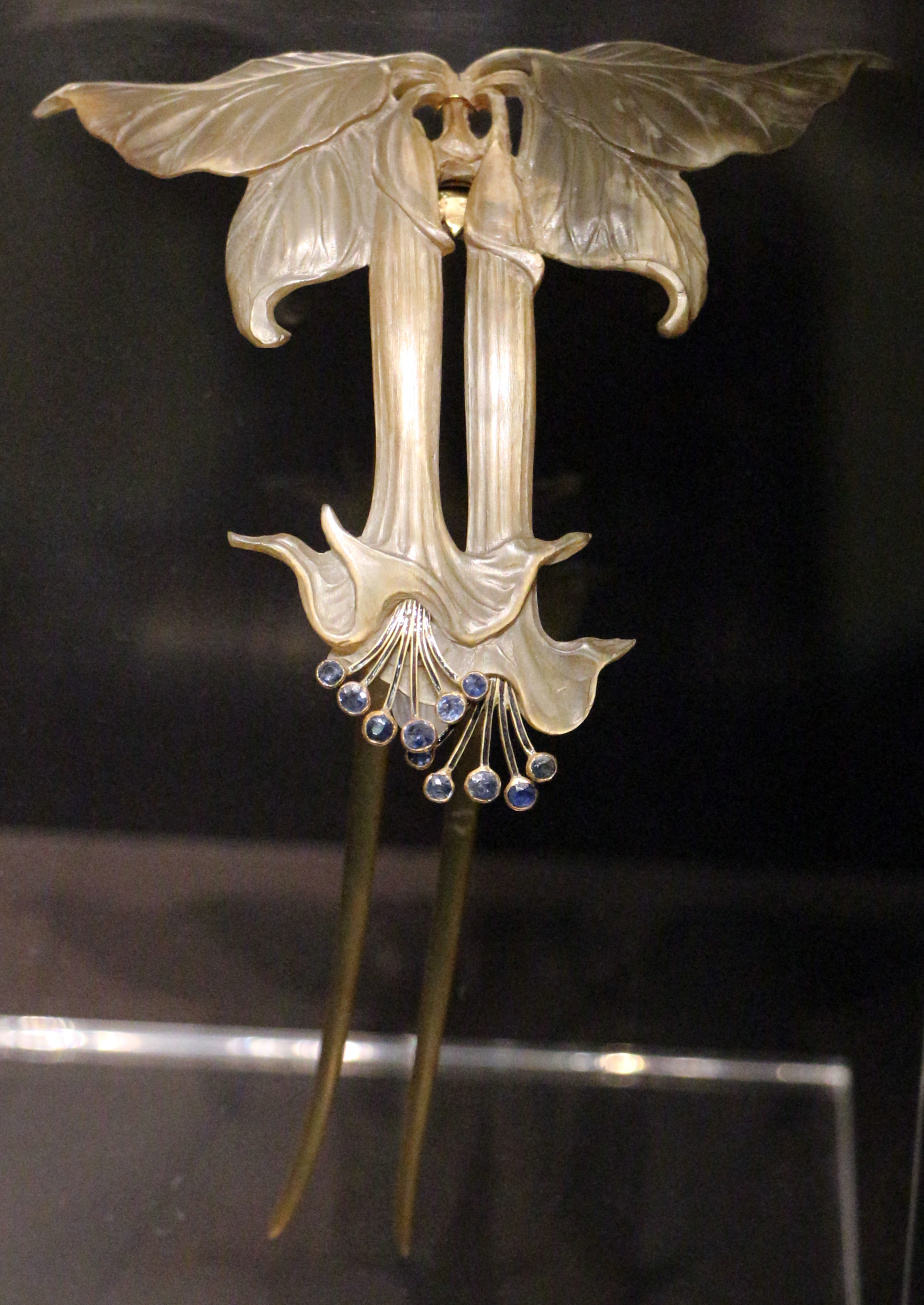
Brooch of horn with enamel, gold and aquamarine by Paul Follot (1904–1909)

=== Modernist jewelry ===
The history of art jewelry is tied to the emergence of modernist jewelry in urban centers of the United States in the 1940s. According to Toni Greenbaum, "Beginning about 1940, a revolutionary jewelry movement began to emerge in the United States, and this was then spurred on by the devastation of World War II, the trauma of the Holocaust, the fear of the bomb, the politics of prejudice, the sterility of industrialization, and the crassness of commercialism." Modernist jewelry shops and studios sprung up in New York City (Frank Rebajes, Paul Lobel, Bill Tendler, Art Smith, Sam Kramer and Jules Brenner in Greenwich Village; and Ed Wiener, Irena Brynner and Henry Steig in midtown Manhattan) and the Bay Area on the West Coast (Margaret De Patta, Peter Macchiarini, Merry Renk, Irena Brynner, Francis Sperisen and Bob Winston). The audience for modernist jewelry was the liberal, intellectual fringe of the middle class, who also supported modern art. Art historian Blanche Brown describes the appeal of this work: "About 1947 I went to Ed Wiener's shop and bought one of his silver square-spiral pins... because it looked great, I could afford it and it identified me with the group of my choice—aesthetically aware, intellectually inclined and politically progressive. That pin (or one of a few others like it) was our badge and we wore it proudly. It celebrated the hand of the artist rather than the market value of the material."

In 1946 the Museum of Modern Art in New York organized the exhibition Modern Handmade Jewelry, which included the work of studio jewelers like Margaret De Patta and Paul Lobel, along with jewelry by modernist artists such as Alexander Calder, Jacques Lipchitz and Richard Pousette-Dart. This exhibition toured the United States, and was followed by a series of influential exhibitions at the Walker Art Center in Minneapolis. Kelly L'Ecuyer suggests that "Calder's jewelry was central to many of the museum and gallery exhibitions of this period, and he continues to be viewed as the seminal figure in American contemporary jewelry." Using cold construction and crude techniques that suggested a spirit of improvisation and creativity, Calder's jewelry shares his sculpture's use of line and movement to depict or imply space, creating jewelry that often moves with the wearer's body. A strong connection with art movements is a characteristic of American art jewelry during this period. While Calder showed a primitivist interest in African and ancient Greek art, Margaret De Patta made jewelry that was constructivist, manipulating light, space and optical perception according to the lessons she learned from László Moholy-Nagy at the New Bauhaus in Chicago. Toni Greenbaum writes that "After his mentor, the painter John Haley, showed him work by Matisse and Picasso, Bob Winston exclaimed: 'That's the kind of crap I'm doing!'." The materials of modernist jewelry—organic and inorganic non-precious substances, as well as found objects—correlate to cubist, futurist and dadaist attitudes, while the styles of modernist jewelry—surrealism, primitivism, biomorphism and constructivism— are fine art movements as well.

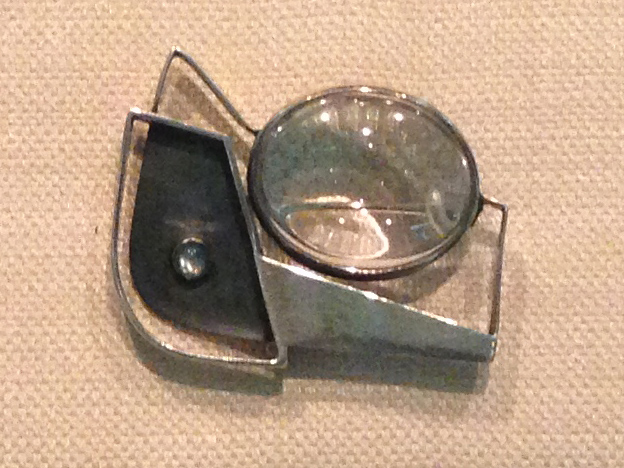
Brooch made of sterling silver and quartz designed by Margaret De Patta (c. 1950)

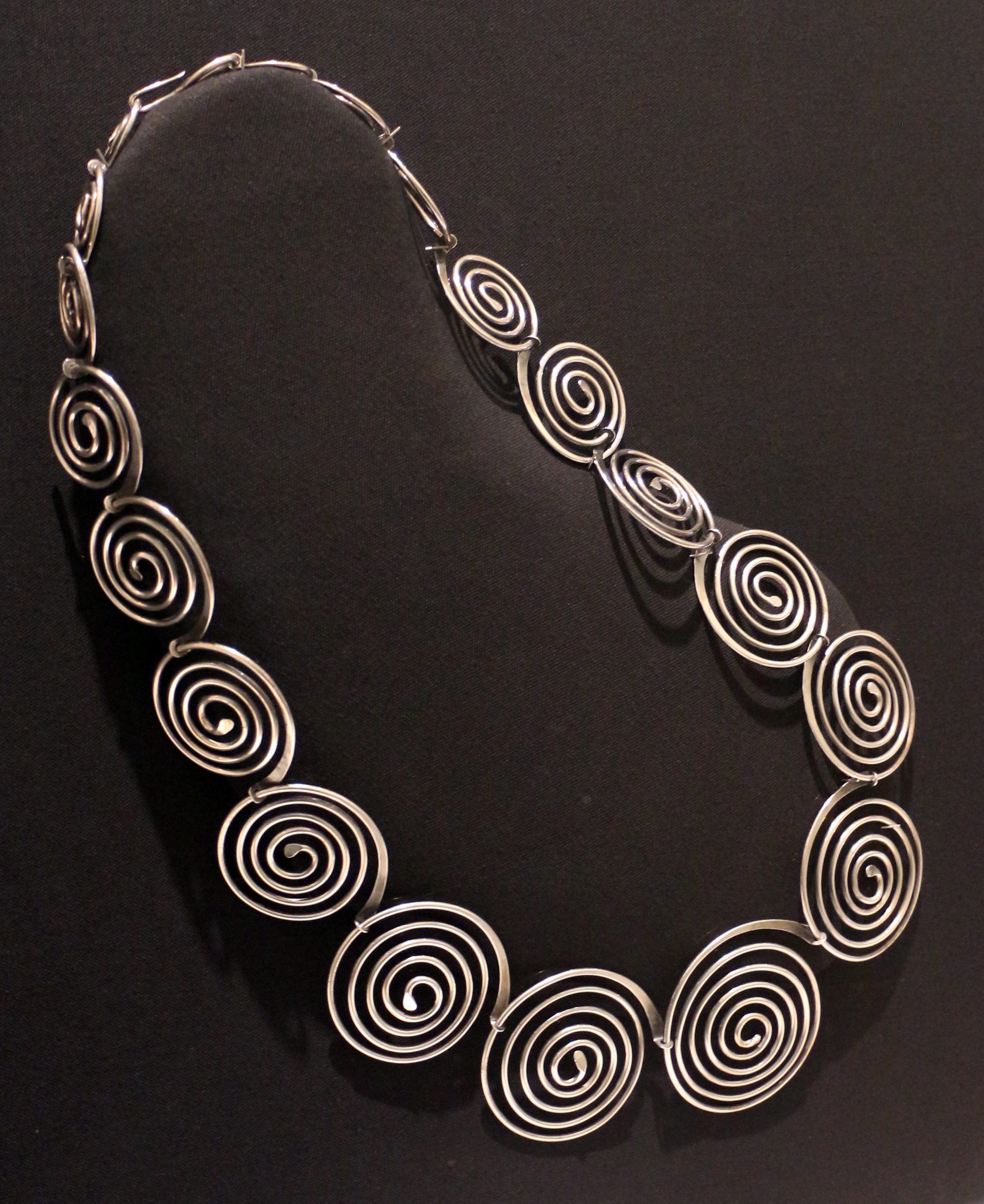
Spiral necklace by Art Smith (c. 1958)

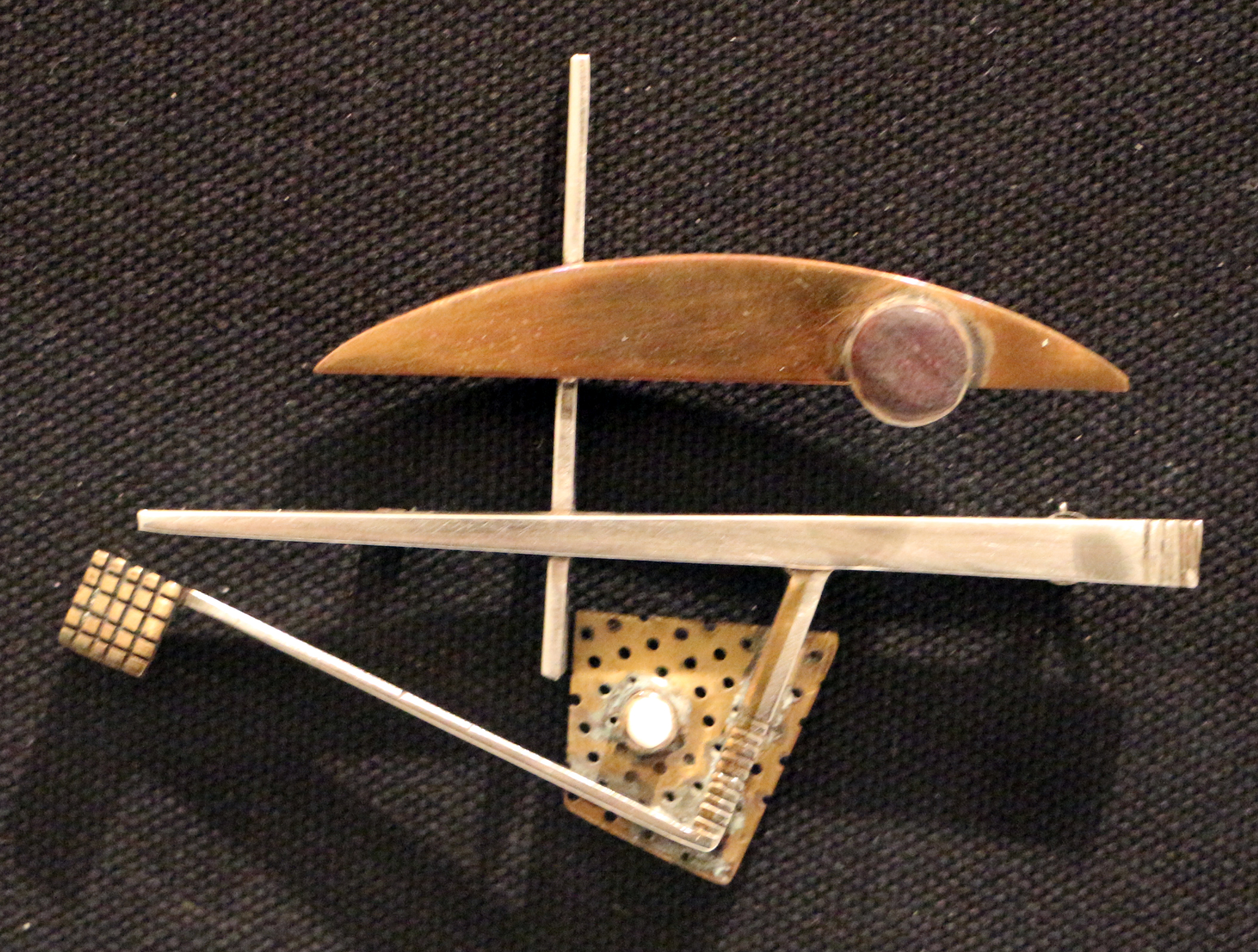
Brooch by Peter Macchiarini (c. 1960)

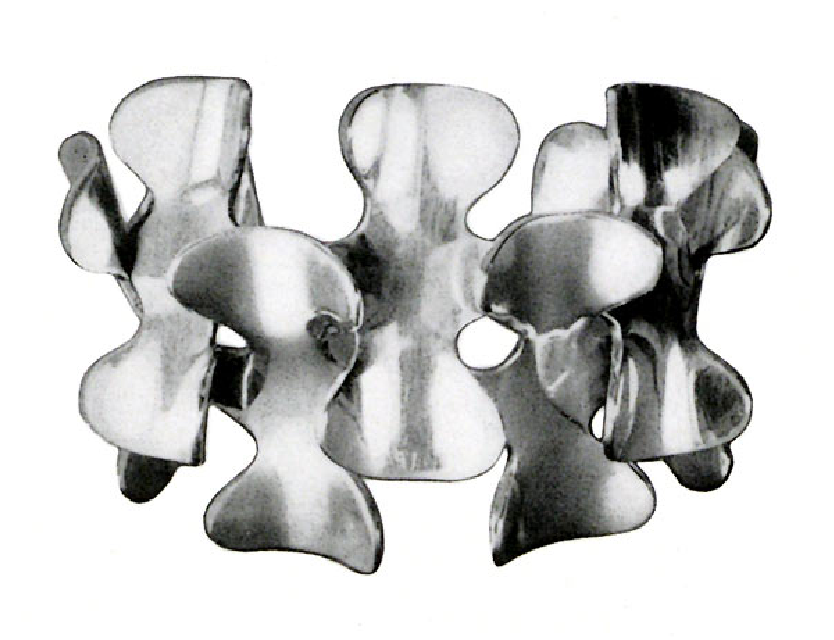
Gold bracelet of interlocking forms by Merry Renk (1961)

=== Art jewelry since the 1960s ===
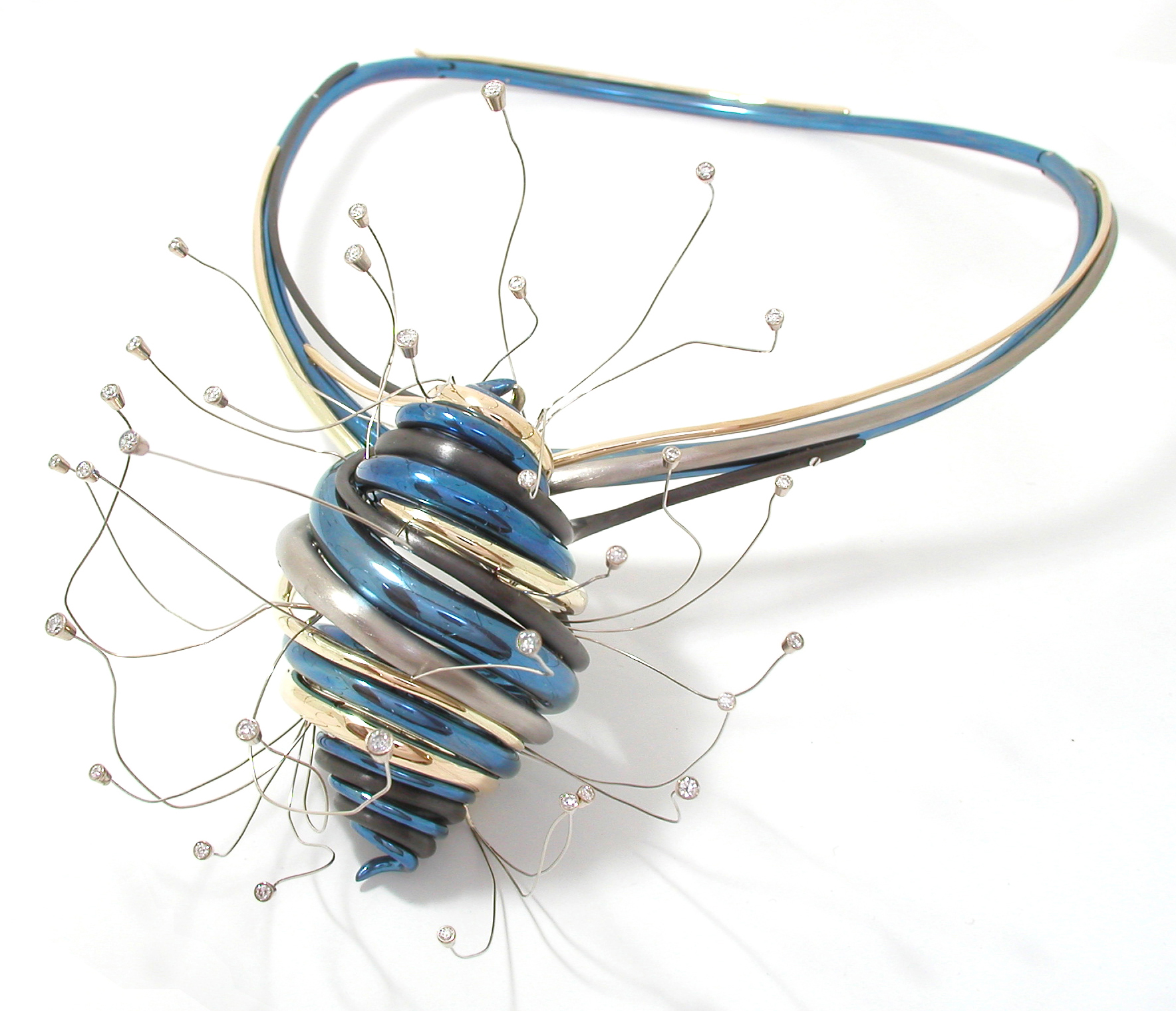
Sparkling Vortex, necklace by Marc Lange, 2007. Made of titanium, zirconium, yellow and white gold, and set with diamonds.

The postwar growth of jewelry in the United States was supported by the concept that jewelry-making techniques, believed to strengthen hand and arm muscles and foster eye-hand coordination, played a role in physical therapy programs for veterans of World War II. The War Veterans' Art Center at the Museum of Modern Art, led by Victor D'Amico, the School for American Craftsman, and the workshops run by Margret Craver in New York City, addressed the needs of returning American servicemen, while the GI Bill of Rights offered free college tuition for veterans, many of whom studied craft. As Kelly L'Ecuyer suggests, "In addition to individual creativity, the proliferation of craft-based education and therapy for soldiers and veterans in the United States during and after the war provided a stimulus for all studio crafts, especially jewelry and metalsmithing. Public and private resources devoted to veterans' craft programs planted the seeds for longer-lasting educational structures and engineered broad interest in craft as a creative, fulfilling lifestyle."

By the early 1960s, graduates of these programs were not only challenging the conventional ideas of jewelry, but teaching a new generation of American jewelers in new university programs in jewelry and metalsmithing courses. Architectonic jewellery was being developed around the same time.

In the 1960s—1970s, the German government and commercial jewelry industry fostered and heavily supported modern jewelry designers, thus creating a new marketplace. They combined contemporary design with traditional goldsmithing and jewelry making. Orfevre, the first gallery for art jewelry, opened in Duesseldorf, Germany, in 1965.

== Exhibitions ==
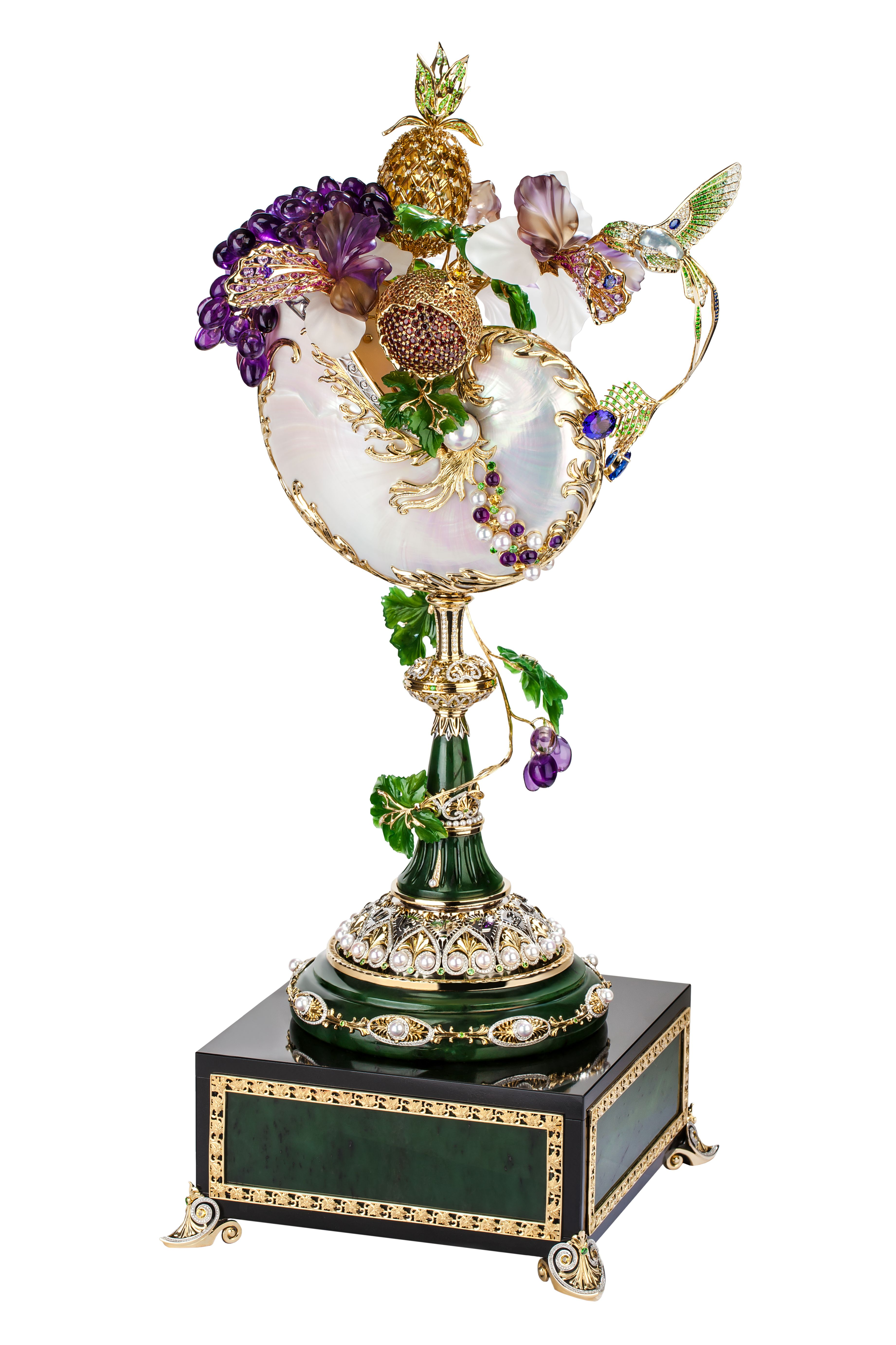
Cornucopia: an interior clock by Moiseikin Jewellery House worth $1 million and exhibited internationally in 2000s. It weighs over 65 kg, includes over 2,000 diamonds, other jewels and a kilogram worth of gold.

The acceptance of jewelry as art was fostered in the United States very quickly after World War II by major museums such as the Museum of Modern Art in New York and the Walker Art Center in Minneapolis, each of which held major shows of art jewelry in the 1940s. The Museum of Arts and Design formerly The American Craft Museum, started their collection in 1958 with pieces dating from the 1940s. Other museums whose collections include work by contemporary (American) jewelry designers include: the Cleveland Museum of Art, The Corning Museum of Glass, the Mint Museum of Craft & Design in Charlotte, NC, the Museum of Fine Arts, Boston, the Museum of Fine Arts, Houston, and the Renwick Gallery of the Smithsonian museum.

Some famous artists who created art jewelry in the past were Calder, Picasso, Man Ray, Meret Oppenheim, Dalí and Nevelson. Some of which represented at Sculpture to Wear Gallery in New York City which closed in 1977. Works by modern artists such as Joan Miró have also been reproduced as licensed jewelry editions by manufacturers and curatorial labels in collaboration with artists' estates. Successio Miro launched a licensed Miro jewelry range with Joidart Barcelona, selling the range through MoMA in New York, art jewelry platform Atelier Modernista, and the Southbank Centre in London.

Artwear Gallery owned by Robert Lee Morris continued in this endeavor to showcase jewelry as an art form.

A collection of art jewelry can be found at the Schmuckmuseum in Pforzheim, Germany.

== List of jewelry artists ==
Listed in the decade in which they were first recognized:

1930s

- Suzanne Belperron, France, 1900-1983

1940s

- Margaret De Patta, United States, 1903–1964
- Art Smith, United States, 1923–1982

1950s

- Claire Falkenstein, United States, 1908–1998
- Peter Macchiarini, United States, 1909-2001
- Ramona Solberg, United States, 1921–2005

1960s

- Gijs Bakker, The Netherlands, 1942-
- Kobi Bosshard, Switzerland / New Zealand, 1939-
- Stanley Lechtzin, United States, 1936-
- Charles Loloma, United States, 1921–1991
- Olaf Skoogfors, Sweden, 1930–1975

1970s

- Noma Copley, United States, 1916-2006
- Arline Fisch, United States, 1931-2024
- William Claude Harper, United States, 1944-
- Mazlo, Lebanon / France 1949-
- Robert Lee Morris, Germany / United States, 1947-

1980s

- Warwick Freeman, New Zealand, 1953-
- Lisa Gralnick, United States, 1953-
- Bruce Metcalf, United States, 1949-
- Alan Preston, New Zealand, 1941-
- Bernhard Schobinger, Switzerland, 1946-

1990s

- Andrea Cagnetti - Akelo, Italy, 1967-
- Karl Fritsch, Germany / New Zealand, 1963-
- Linda MacNeil, United States, 1954-
- Lisa Walker, New Zealand, 1967-
- Areta Wilkinson, New Zealand, 1969-
- Nancy Worden, United States, 1954-

2000s

- Anna Hu, Taiwan, 1977-
- Rebecca Rose, USA, 1980-
- Betony Vernon, USA, 1968-

== See also ==
- Metal Arts Guild of San Francisco
- Jewellery
- Wearable art
