= VFO (disambiguation) =

VFO may refer to:

- Variable-frequency oscillator, an oscillator whose frequency can be tuned over some range
- Vserossiyskaya Fašistskija Organizatsiya, a Russian political group
- Verein für Originalgraphik, a non-profit arts institution
- VFO mode, a Walkie-talkie feature
