= Schobinger =

Schobinger is a surname. Notable people with the surname include:

- Bernhard Schobinger (born 1946), Swiss contemporary artist jeweler
- Josef Anton Schobinger (1849–1911), Swiss politician
- Viktor Schobinger (1893-1989), German World War I flying ace
