= Edition VFO =

Non-profit arts institution in Zürich, Switzerland

Coordinates: 47.3891557°N 8.5226359°E

- Established: 1948
- Location: Zürich, Switzerland
- Type: Non-profit
- Director: David Khalat
- Website: www.edition-vfo.ch

Edition VFO, Verein für Originalgraphik, is a non-profit arts institution, edition publisher and gallery based in Zürich.

== History ==
The Kunstverein was founded in 1948 as a non-profit "association for the promotion of art". The purpose of the association is to foster traditional and contemporary printing techniques. The editions, printed and published by Edition VFO are selected by a jury. According to the statute, the Kunstverein promotes the broad interest in the fine arts and at the same time encourages artists to print graphic works with classic printing techniques. The Edition VFO currently counts (2020) as an art association around 800 members.

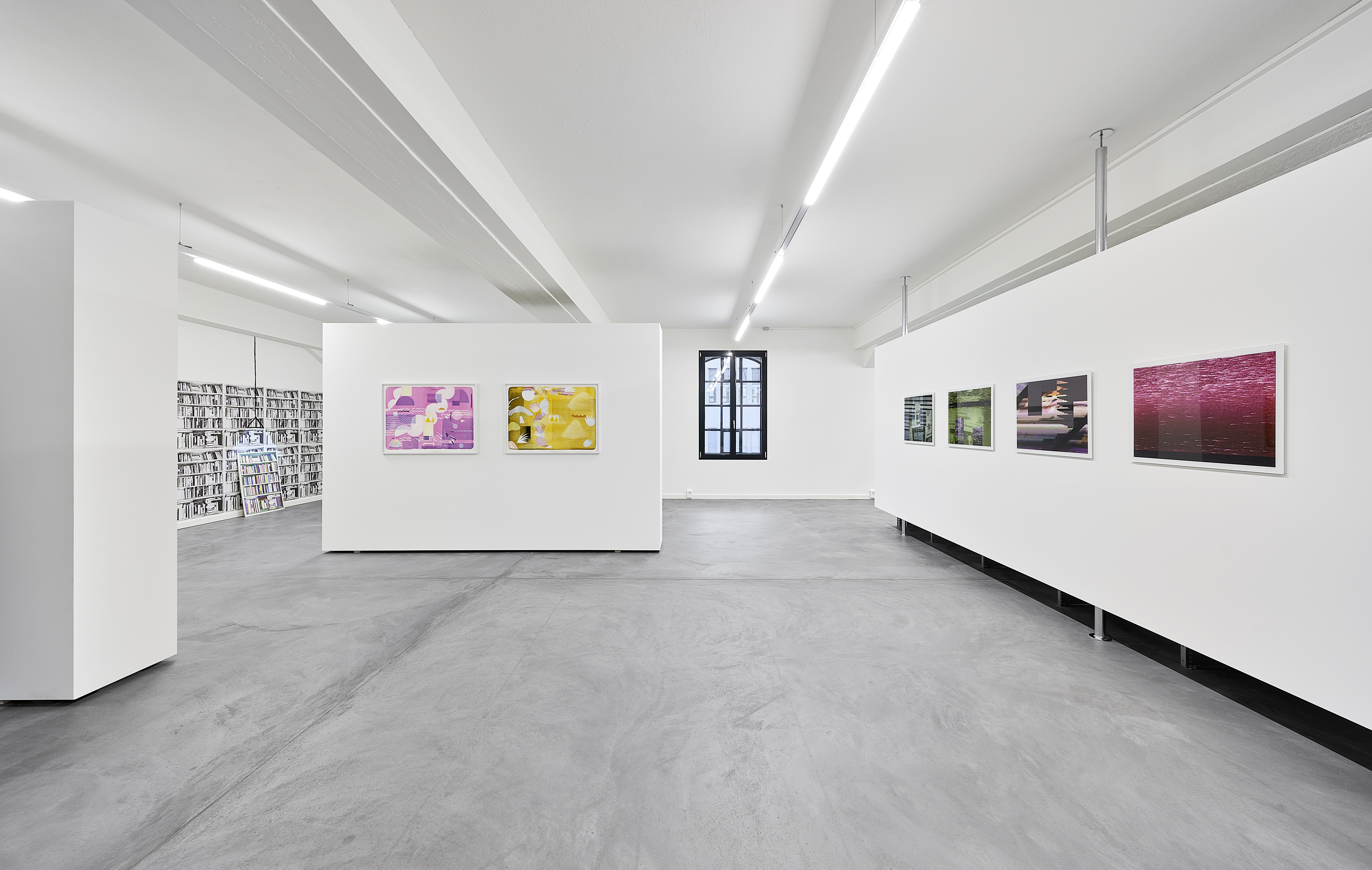
Installation view with works by Zilla Leutenegger, Charlotte Herzig and Roman Signer, November 2022

== Exhibitions and Editions ==
The association has published numerous editions with Swiss and international artists maintaining affordable prices in recent decades. Edition VFO publishes up to 60 editions a year and shows them in various exhibitions. Many works have been exhibited and presented in collaboration with Swiss museums and institutions, such as Bündner Kunstmuseum, Chur or Museum Tinguely, Basel. Among others, Edition VFO has published works and did exhibitions with artists such as Pipilotti Rist, Leiko Ikemura, Richard Deacon, Roman Signer, Günther Förg, Shirana Shahbazi, Annelies Strba, Tony Cragg, Keren Cytter, Sylvie Fleury, Julian Charrière or Olivier Mosset in recent years.

== Publications ==
David Khalat (ed.): Print Art Now. Scheidegger & Spiess Zurich 2023, ISBN 978-3-03942-149-7.

David Khalat (ed.): On Photography. Imagery in Contemporary Printmaking. About Books Zurich 2021, ISBN 978-3-906946-30-6.

David Khalat, Bernard Vienat (ed.): La métamorphose de l'art imprimé. Zeitgenössische westschweizer Editionen und serielle Unikate. Verlag für Moderne Kunst Wien 2020, ISBN 978-3-903320-44-4.

Hans Eggenberger, Annemarie Bucher, Hans Egli (ed.): Verein für Originalgraphik 1948-1998. Zurich 1998, ISBN 3-9521610-0-4.

H. and H. Zschokke: Verein für Originalgraphik 1948-1982 (Catalog Raisonne of works). Orell Füssli, Zurich 1982.
