= Rebecca Rose =

American sculptor (born 1980)

- Born: Rebecca Downin; September 18, 1980 (age 45); Mesa, Arizona, United States
- Other name: Rebecca Rose
- Occupation: American sculptor
- Known for: Sculpting, Art Jewelry
- Website: sculpturings.com//

Rebecca “Rose” Michelle Downin (born September 18, 1980) is an American sculptor.

Rose works primarily in small-scale sculptural jewelry, which she calls "Sculpturings". She began sculpting at the age of 19 and created her first Sculpturing in 1999. She attended college under a full tuition art scholarship and received a BFA degree in 2001 from Northern Arizona University in Flagstaff, Arizona. Rose currently lives and works between Los Angeles, California, and Orlando, Florida.

== Early life ==
Rebecca Rose was born in Mesa, Arizona, United States, to American parents, and her ancestry can be traced to the Daughters of the American Revolution. She adopted the professional name “Rebecca Rose” in tribute to her mother, Michelle, who tended roses in Mesa. In her adolescence, her behavior and art was often misunderstood by her family. Her family’s instability later became a subject of her work, most notably in The Unabridged Paper Doll Diner (2001), a 30 × 15 × 8 ft interactive installation that she has described as a catalyst for her parents' near-divorce and the first time she "seriously realized [her] art was powerful".

In 1998, at the age of 17, Rose began studying printmaking, metal smithing, and fine arts at Northern Arizona University (NAU), which she has described as one of the best experiences of her life. When she attended NAU, her professor at the time handed her a block of wax and gave one direction: make a ring. Without any more guidelines or restrictions, Rebecca envisioned that a ring "could be any size, any shape, and have any statement". It was at NAU that she saw the similarities between sculpture created in the foundry and cast jewelry, the only difference between the two being that one of the forms is heavier and more apt to be immobile and decorative, while the other form is smaller and more apt to be mobile and functional. She received a full scholarship to complete her Bachelor of Fine Arts at NAU, and she served as student supervisor for the NAU Jewelry/Metalsmithing Department, Arizona, for two consecutive terms from 1999 to 2001.

== Charity work ==
Rose is also known for her charity work and frequently donates original artworks for charity auctions, raising money to benefit HIV/AIDS charities, LGBT causes, breast cancer awareness, and children's charities. Rose has often appeared in person on the charity night to help increase the highest bid.

== Political views ==
She asserts that most of her work is influenced by political and current social events, with the works’ messages acting as "a narrative or allegorical observation". Rose's piece “Puppeteering” (2012) depicts her views on the Occupy Movements from 2011. The three figures, ranging in age and gender, represent the majority view throughout the summer and fall of 2011. They band together, pointing the finger of blame, responsibility, and caution to the government's "puppeteering" of the future. Government is represented by the soldier who rides the back of a big baby, representing our future which, at times, can seem like a big bumbling baby that needs to be led around. The pitchfork and hand trap the baby to symbolize the fine line between the evil actions of politics and the hasty actions of the public. The piece was included in "The Master Blasters of Sculpture IV" show held annually at the Hive Gallery and Studios in Los Angeles, California. The piece "Inspiring" (2011) is draws on the graffiti/street-art movement. The three spray-paint nozzles mingled with the three brushes signify the birth of the [street art] movement. Banksy is represented by the rat, Mr. Brainwash is represented by the brain, and Shepard Fairey is represented by the fairy wings on top of the spray can. A skateboard and ribbons on the side of the band signify their victory in making the genre bona fide in the fine art world.

== Controversy ==
Her piece "Triggering" (2009) was included in A Call to Arms: The Newtown Project, held at Charles Krause Reporting/Fine Art Gallery in Washington, DC, on Inauguration Day January 21, 2013. The show drew much critical and controversial attention as a response to the Sandy Hook Elementary shooting in Newtown, CT.

== Found objects ==
Rose has often made use of found objects in her work, and creates each detailed ring out of a myriad of random items and toys from the large collection of found objects accumulated in her studio before she begins creating a cast out of wax.

== Installations and large sculpture ==
In 2001, for her thesis at Northern Arizona University, she built an interactive, life-size, 30’ x 15’ x 8’ installation called "The Unabridged Paper Doll Diner" (2001), and after creating large, space-eating sculptures, she realized she had to go that large to go so small with her rings.

== Sculpturing ==
Much critical and popular acclaim has been garnered for Rose's sculptured jewelry known as Sculpturings. They have been described as "tiny detailed sculptures that fit on your finger", Her collections of small sculptures represent current world events or social issues in a miniature artistic sculpture bound to a finger ring. Each piece interweaves a message or concept associated with the word or suffix "ring", and are named to describe the piece in question. Her work is cast in precious metals of gold, silver and bronze derived from the lost wax casting process. Each ring is displayed in a hand-blown glass cloche dome and is elevated by an engraved base and armature to appear as if the ring is floating in mid-air. A magnifying glass accompanies each piece, allowing viewers to experience minute details and to create an intimate moment with the viewer and the piece. She utilizes precious metals and found and burnable objects to create what she calls "functional mobile sculpture", generally in the form of wearable art or art jewelry. She sculpts on a small scale, so the viewer can wear and take the sculpture with them. Rose's official definition of the Sculpturings series is: "an artistic collection of small sculpture on a mobile scale for fingers, with the intent to combine current social issues artistically represented in a physical sculptural form with language that contains the word or suffix “ring” precious metals of gold, silver and bronze derived from the wax casting process. The series is best known under her registered trademark Sculpturings, officially registered in 2012.

== Awards ==
In 2011, Rose was one of four finalists selected for a nationwide art competition by Renee Vara of Vara Fine Art NYC. She has since exhibited her work in the National Juried Group Show at the Phoenix Gallery in the Chelsea District of New York City. In 2013, she was selected for the Society of North American Goldsmiths and Crafthaus Scholarship where she instructed fellow artists on how to "Show Publicly & Build a Legacy Privately". In December 2012, her work was selected for Cream, an exhibition held at Mother Falcon Gallery showcasing "the cream of the crop, La creme de la creme, the cream of the cream, the best of the best, the best of Orlando artists." Rose's work has been commissioned and privately owned throughout the United States, Canada, Sweden, Italy, Belgium, and England. Bronze and Sterling Silver Sculpturings are also in the collections of The Andy Warhol Museum and Andrew Lincoln, an actor from the AMC television series The Walking Dead. Her Sculpturings have shown extensively throughout Los Angeles, and at Julie's Artisan Gallery on Madison Avenue in New York.

== Collecting ==
Rose is an avid collector of art, with her collection containing works from artists Shepard Fairey and Audrey Kawasaki. She states that being an art collector influences her approach towards her own art, and prompts her to include documentation with each piece so the provenance of her own art is "a cinch". She regularly attends VIP art openings and vernissages to major art events and fairs, such as the LA Art Show and Art Basel Miami Beach.

== Influences ==
Rose repeatedly credits Sam Wagstaff as an inspiration for her silver work. She takes note of the advances he made bringing photography into the limelight as an art form and was greatly influenced by his plans to do the same with silver sculpture. but AIDS took his life before he could see it manifest. In the documentary Black, White + Grey, Wagstaff had amassed a considerably large collection of sterling silver sculpture, from which Rose was inspired to make his dream a reality. Andy Warhol is another often-cited influence, as he was a collector of unique silver, specifically silver jewelry. His quote, "It would be very glamorous to be reincarnated as a big ring", is quoted on Rose's official website. The quote is truncated from the original quote taken from the documentary Superstar- The Life and Times of Andy Warhol, which states: "It would be very glamorous to be reincarnated as a big ring on Elizabeth Taylor's finger."

Rose often relates the movie Johnny Tremain (Film), which she watched in her youth, as another major influence in her life. In a 2012 interview in Nothing to Nobody Magazine, she describes the similarities between her and the fictional character who is "boldly confident, clashes with religion, often misunderstood, fights against injustice, and stands for the freedom of man and basic human rights at the start of the Revolutionary War. Johnny Tremain is a Silversmith apprentice who, while casting a cup handle carved from wax, scalds his hand on molten silver. The image of the bright red liquid metal and his scarred, disfigured hand burned into my brain and popped up in my subconscious at random times growing up..."

== Face painting ==
Rose is also known for her body and face paintings. Her face paintings have appeared in numerous film and print material from The Walt Disney Company and Lucasfilm.
