= Geoffrey Beene =

American fashion designer (1924–2004)

- Born: Samuel Albert Bozeman Jr. August 30, 1924; Haynesville, Louisiana, U.S.
- Died: September 28, 2004 (aged 80); New York City, U.S.
- Education: Tulane University; University of Southern California; Traphagen School of Fashion; Ecole de la Chambre Syndicale de la Couture Parisienne
- Occupation: Fashion designer

Geoffrey Beene (born Samuel Albert Bozeman Jr.; August 30, 1924 – September 28, 2004) was an American fashion designer. Beene was one of New York's most famous fashion designers, recognized for his artistic and technical skills, and for creating simple, comfortable, and dressy women's wear.

In 2018, the Geoffrey Beene brand was acquired by PVH, who previously produced the brand under license.

On June 23, 2021, it was announced that the Geoffrey Beene brand would be sold to Authentic Brands Group alongside Van Heusen, Izod, and Arrow. The sale closed on August 2, 2021, with United Legwear & Apparel Company named as its licensee alongside the Van Heusen and Arrow brands. However, in April 2023 it was announced that Versa Group would be the new licensee for the Geoffrey Beene brand.

== Early life and education ==
Geoffrey Beene, LLC
- Type: Privately held company
- Industry: Clothing, Eyewear, and Formal wear
- Founded: 1963
- Headquarters: New York City, New York, U.S.
- Key people: Geoffrey Beene and G. Thompson Hutton
- Products: Clothes, perfume, formal wear, sunglasses, eyewear, jewelry, luggage
- Parent: Authentic Brands Group (licensed to Versa Group)
- Website: GeoffreyBeene.com

Beene was born on August 30, 1924, as Samuel Albert Bozeman Jr. in the small rural town of Haynesville, Louisiana, located just south of the Arkansas state line. He was born into a family of doctors and was encouraged to follow in their footsteps. He studied medicine at Tulane University in New Orleans but dropped out in 1946, after three years of study. Beene moved to Los Angeles, where he studied fashion design at the University of Southern California and worked in the display department of the I. Magnin retail store until 1947.

Later that year, he moved to New York City to attend the Traphagen School of Fashion. He then moved to Paris, where he attended the Ecole de la Chambre Syndicale de la Couture Parisienne (ECSCP) and the couture house of Molyneux. In 1949, he returned to New York, where he became Assistant Designer at the Seventh Avenue house of Harmay. In 1958, he left Harmay to design with Teal Traina, before founding his eponymous design house.

== Career ==
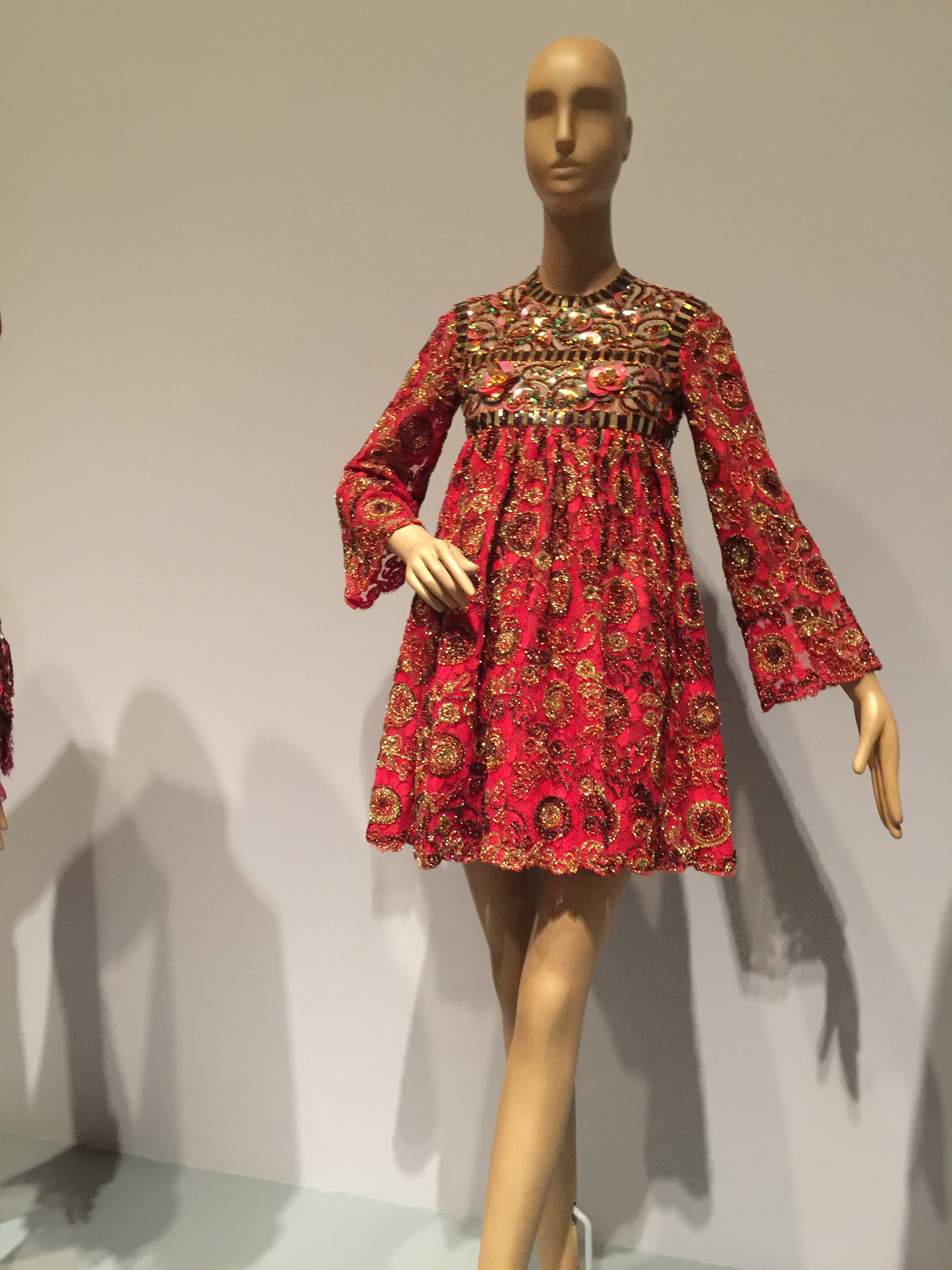
Embroidered lace evening minidress by Beene, 1968-69 (Philadelphia Museum of Art )

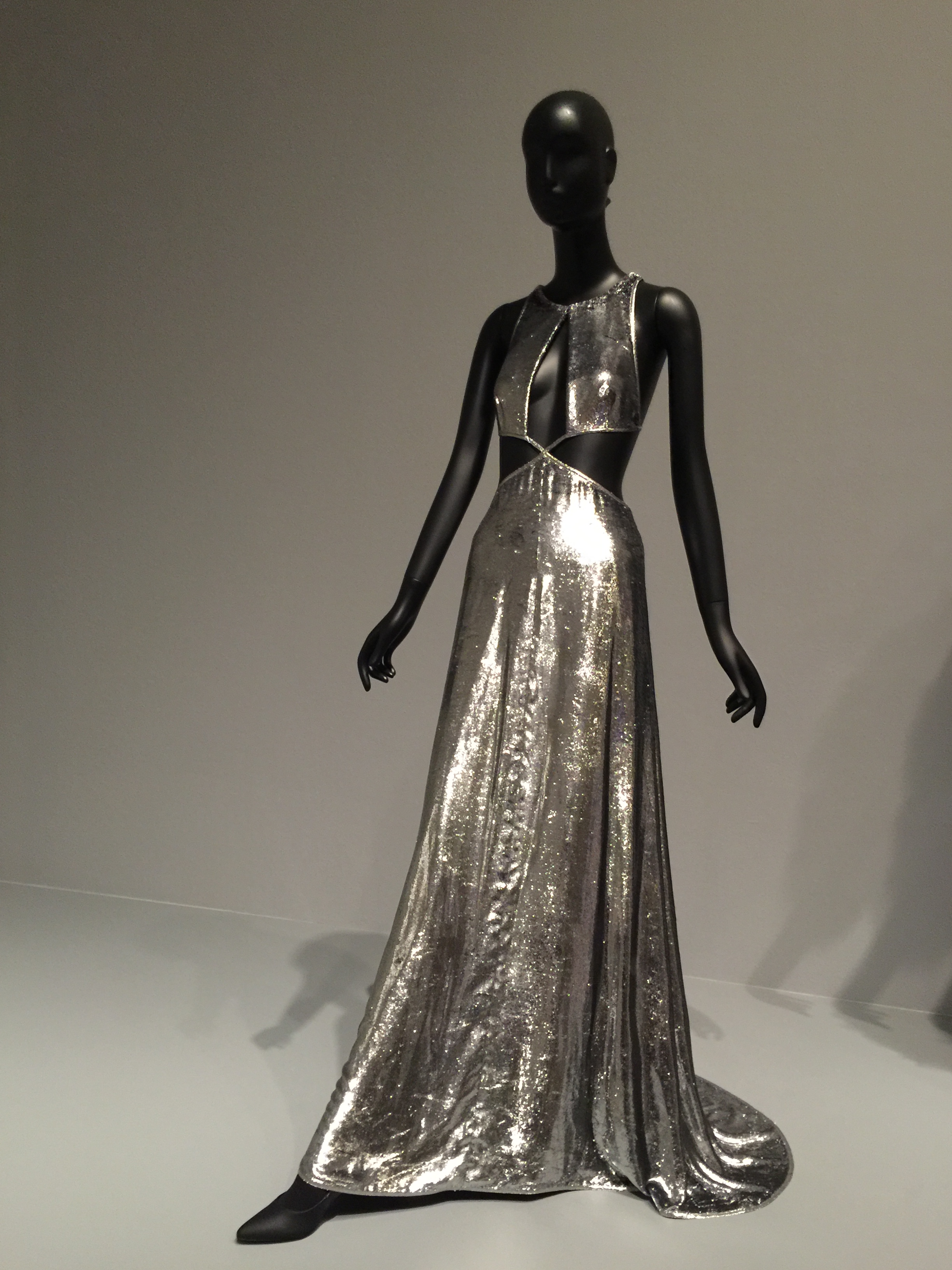
Lamé velvet "Mercury" evening dress by Beene, Fall-Winter 1994-5 (Philadelphia Museum of Art)

Beene founded his firm, Geoffrey Beene, Inc., in New York City in 1963, in partnership with Teal Traina's Leo Orlandi in a Seventh Avenue showroom.

A year later, he was awarded the Coty American Fashion Critics' Award, one of the most prestigious awards in fashion. His first collection was featured on the cover of Vogue Magazine.

In his 1970 collection, Beene applied the use of inexpensive fabrics such as sweatshirt and denim fabric for evening dresses. Introduced in 1971, the Beene Bag line of women’s wear used the same silhouettes as his couture line. By the mid-1970s, Beene had a number of licensing agreements for products such as eyeglasses and bed sheets, and also his most famously known cologne called Grey Flannel, launched in 1975. It contains notes of orange, lemon, rose, geranium, sandalwood and cedar wood, and is considered a classic men's fragrance winning a FIFI Award in 1976. In 1976, Beene became the first American designer to show a collection in Milan, Italy. This success led to his sixth Coty Award in 1977, for giving impetus to American fashion abroad. In 1982, Beene received his eighth Coty Award; the most awarded to any one designer.

In 1986, Beene was named The Council of Fashion Designers of America's Designer of the Year. Two years later, the Council of Fashion Designers of America awarded Beene the Special Award for Fashion as Art. In 1989, he opened the first Geoffrey Beene retail boutique on Fifth Avenue.

Beene's clients included Lady Bird Johnson, Pat Nixon, Nancy Reagan, Faye Dunaway and Glenn Close. Beene was known as both an innovator and a teacher. Several of his former apprentices, Kay Unger, Alber Elbaz and Maria Pinto are now successful fashion designers.

== Death ==
On September 28, 2004, Beene died from pneumonia, as a complication of squamous-cell carcinoma, at his home on the Upper East Side of Manhattan.

== Geoffrey Beene Lifetime Achievement Award ==
In honor of Beene's fashion legacy, the Council of Fashion Designers of America created the annual Geoffrey Beene Lifetime Achievement award in 1984.

Geoffrey Beene Lifetime Achievement Award Recipients

Year	Recipient
1984	James Galanos
1985	Katharine Hepburn
1986	Bill Blass
1987	Giorgio Armani
1988	Nancy Reagan
1989	Oscar De La Renta
1990	Martha Graham
1991	Ralph Lauren
1997	Geoffrey Beene
1999	Yves Saint Laurent
2000	Valentino Garavani
2001	Calvin Klein
2002	Karl Lagerfeld
2003	Anna Wintour
2004	Donna Karan
2005	Diane von Furstenberg
2006	Stan Herman
2007	Robert Lee Morris
2008	Carolina Herrera
2009	Anna Sui
2010	Michael Kors
2011	Marc Jacobs
2012	Tommy Hilfiger
2013	Vera Wang
2014	Tom Ford
2015	Betsey Johnson
2016	Norma Kamali
2017	Rick Owens
2018	Narciso Rodriguez
2019	Bob Mackie
2020	n/a
2021	Dapper Dan
2022	Laurie Lynn and Richard Stark
2023	Maria Cornejo

== Charitable activities ==
All net profits from Geoffrey Beene products are donated to philanthropic causes, such as cancer research, Alzheimer's research, domestic violence prevention and response, Save the Children, and educational programs, including scholarships for students majoring in fashion and related disciplines.

In 2007, The Geoffrey Beene Foundation formed a strategic alliance with the FSF YMA Fashion Scholarship Fund to further the mutual goal of expanding support for students seeking careers in the Fashion Industry. The foundation has donated to the FSF in excess of $5 million committed through 2016.
