= Kay Unger =

American fashion designer (born 1945)

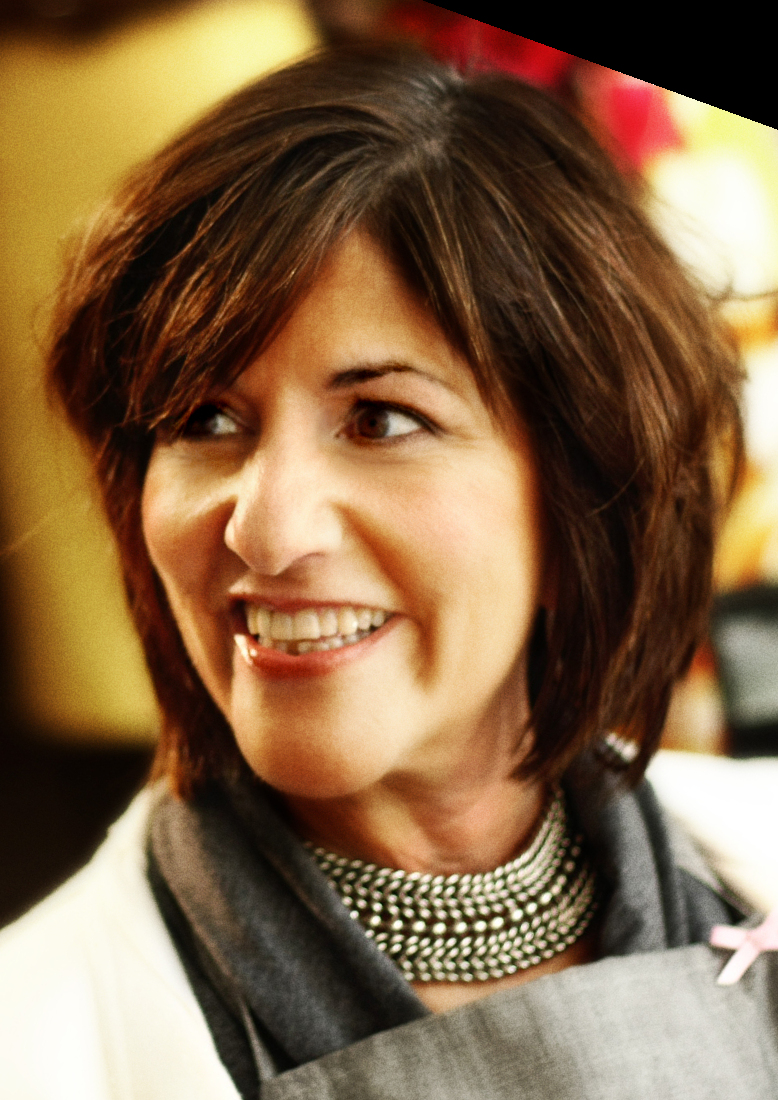
- Unger in 2009
- Born: May 22, 1945 (age 81); Chicago, Illinois; United States
- Education: Washington University in St. Louis; Parsons The New School for Design
- Occupations: Fashion designer; entrepreneur; philanthropist
- Labels: Kay Unger New York; Phoebe Couture; Career Separates by Kay Unger; Kay J’s by Kay Unger

Kay Unger is an American fashion designer. Until July 2012, she was the creative head and public face of Phoebe Company LLC and its brands.

== Biography ==
Unger was born in Chicago, IL and first studied painting in the Fine Arts Program at the Sam Fox School of Design & Visual Arts at Washington University in St. Louis before switching to design at Parsons The New School for Design in New York City.

Upon graduation from Parsons in the late 1960s, she worked as one of three apprentices for Geoffrey Beene. After a year, she decided to develop her own line, and, in 1972, along with her two business partners, Howard Bloom and Jon Levy, founded The Gillian Group to produce dinner dresses. The dresses were sold under the Gillian label, and the group and its many divisions quickly became one of the largest suppliers of women's apparel in America, growing to a $125 million company.

== Company/Brand History ==
Fifteen days after closing the Gillian Group, Unger founded Phoebe Company LLC., where she established the line bearing her name, Kay Unger New York.

In 1999, she was inducted as a Leading Woman Entrepreneur of the World. In 2005, the company launched Kay J's, a whimsical print pajama brand. In 2007, they launched Phoebe Couture, a more youthful and edgier line of dresses for day and evening. Later that same year, they began opening Kay Unger and Phoebe Couture boutiques in China through a licensing agreement with the JT Group of Hong Kong. In September 2008 Kay Unger New York Eyewear and Phoebe Couture Eyewear were launched.

The $40 million company's dresses, suits, and eyewear are currently sold in more than 24 countries including the U.K., Turkey, Brazil, Australia, and Spain.

Kay is an active member of the Council of Fashion Designers of America (CFDA). Additionally, she is on the Board of Directors as well as a Trustee at her alma mater, Parsons/The New School for Design, as well as a participant in their education program in the Dominican Republic, where she has traveled as a guest instructor.

== Kay Unger Design ==
After leaving her company, Unger founded Kay Unger Design LLC., a multidimensional company whose products range from clothing and shoes to home products. As the CEO, Unger lectures on design and entrepreneurship. Under the Kay Unger Design rubric, Unger has sold high-fashion sketches around the world.

== Philanthropy ==
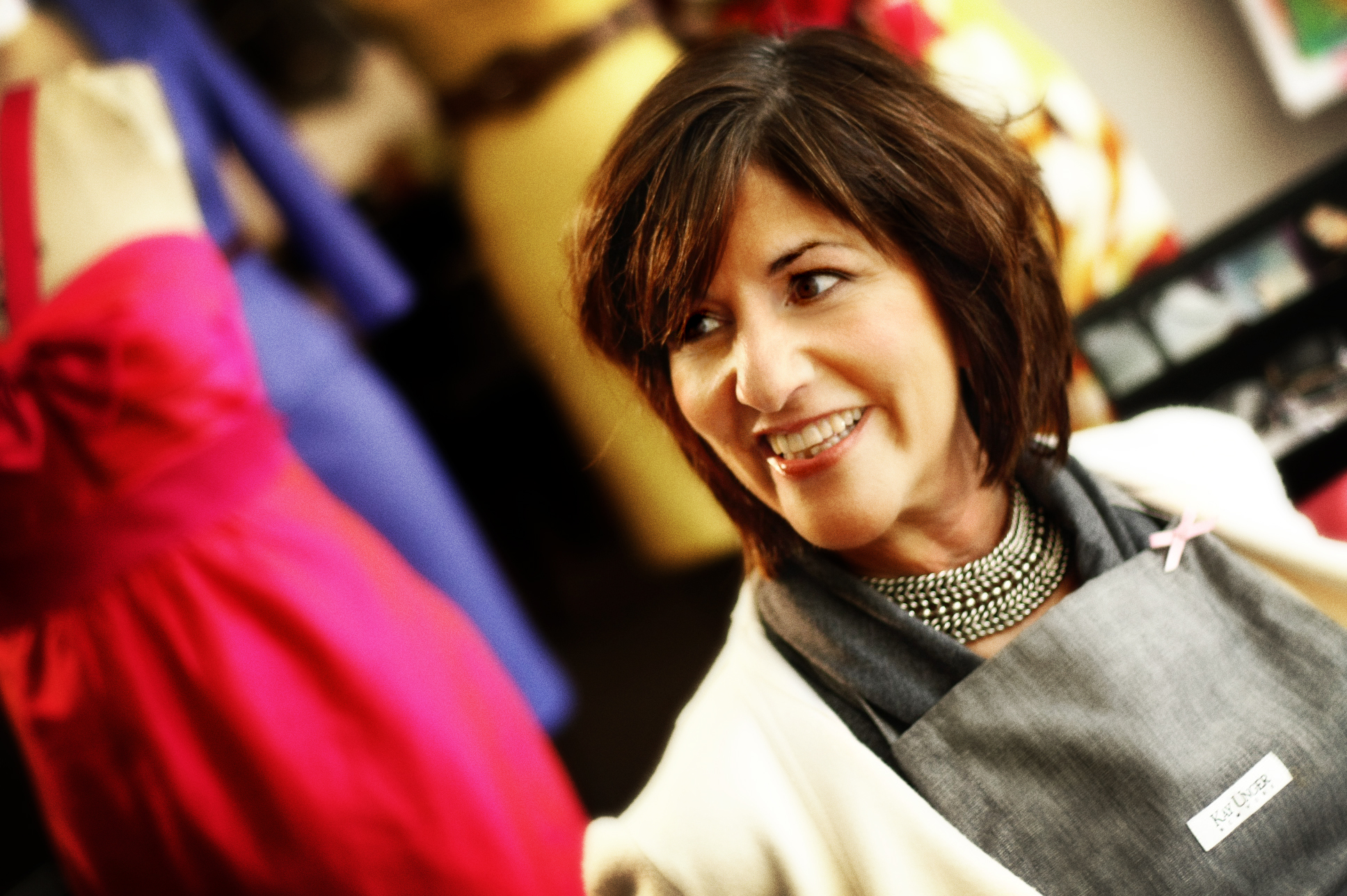
Unger, in May 2009

Unger is the founder of the Kay Unger Family Foundation, a group that has raised funds for cancer research and arts education. She has been a longtime member of the Boys & Girls Clubs of America, where she was the first woman board member. She is a founding member and board member of The Committee of 200, an organization that advances women's leadership in business, and the Women's Campaign Fund. A cancer survivor herself, Kay has a personal interest in funding cancer research and raised over $250,000 for cancer research while she served as the president of the Fashion Group International. She works with Stand Up To Cancer, an initiative dedicated to accelerating cancer research and bringing new therapies to patients more quickly, by raising funds and awareness in the fashion industry. On May 4, 2009, Kay Unger was recognized by City of Hope as a "Spirit of Life Award" recipient who has made notable contributions to her profession, her community, and her charitable causes.
