= Architectonic jewellery =

Subset of Constructivist studio jewelry

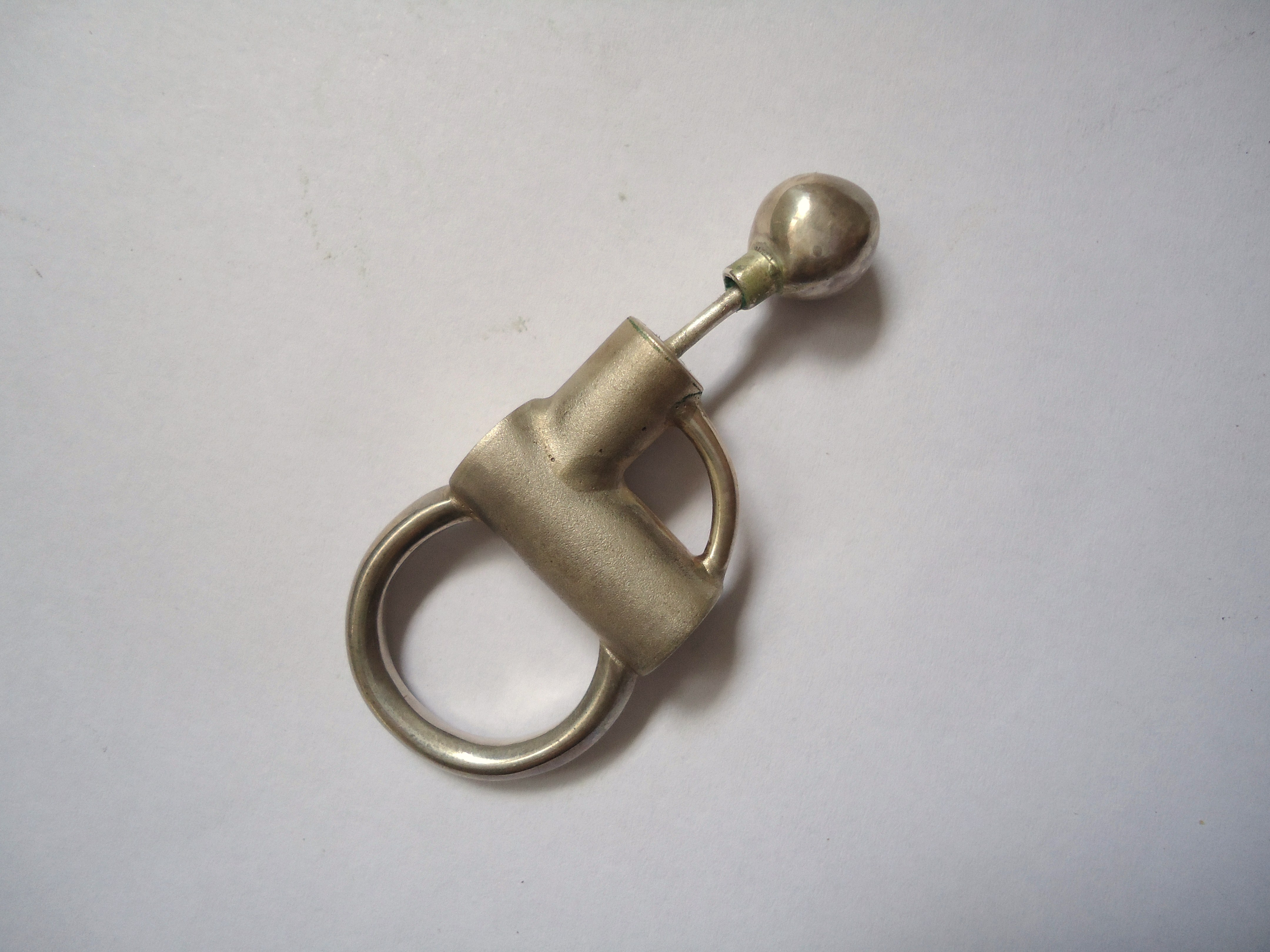
Example of a silver ring with architectonic influence, particularly the use of texture and the kinetic element at the top of the item.

Architectonic jewellery is a subset of Constructivist studio jewellery that makes use of architectural forms and ideas in the much smaller-scale format of jewellery. Some of the defining elements of architectonic jewellery are linearity, inclusion of geometric elements, undisguised structural elements, and use of varying depth to convey a sense of design in three dimensions rather than only two. Certain architectonic pieces include moving parts, which enables "extending or reconfiguring" the pieces by the wearer. Architectonic jewellery often incorporates materials more typically used in engineering such as stainless steel and niobium, reinforcing the association with architecture.

== Development ==
The concept of architectonic jewellery began to emerge around the 1960s. At the time, the majority of jewellery was produced by luxury brand names such as Cartier, Bulgari, and Tiffany; these pieces were intended to serve as status symbols or investments rather than as artistic expressions. They tended to use mostly traditional precious metals and gemstones, and shied away from modern styling.

Individual artisan jewellers working from smaller studios began to move away from the traditional, formal styles produced by these luxury brands. Encouraged by clientele with self-made wealth, and less formal, more modern tastes, these jewellers began to deliberately break from the stylistic limitations of old. Artisans began to create pieces based on organic textures or found objects.

In this environment of innovation, some jewellers took a renewed interest in abstraction and geometry. With strong reference to the Bauhaus movement of the 1920s, these artisans created works that explored the relationship of function to form. Many, though not all, of the jewellers working in this style had architectural interests or training. The Israeli jeweller Deganit Stern Schoken, for example, was trained as an architect.

== Design elements ==
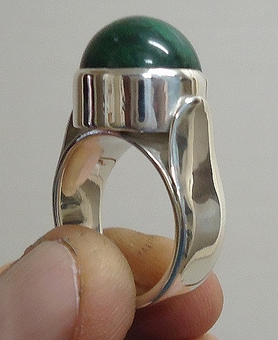
Green jasper set in silver ring demonstrating visible structural elements.

Architectonic jewellery is primarily concerned with exploring architectural principles such as scale and proportion in relation to the human body. Classical proportions such as the golden ratio may be employed, because these proportions look aesthetically pleasing when scaled up or down to be appropriate for architecture as well as for jewellery. Architectonic pieces often include linear or geometric elements, which can be scaled up or down to explore or demonstrate proportion.

=== Form ===
Visible structural elements such as settings and attachments are also an important part of the architectonic style. For example, in the silver ring with green jasper pictured, the setting holding the stone is attached to the main body of the ring in a way that visually emphasizes the attachment, rather than attempting to conceal it. This mimics certain architectural techniques where structural elements such as ceiling beams are left exposed.

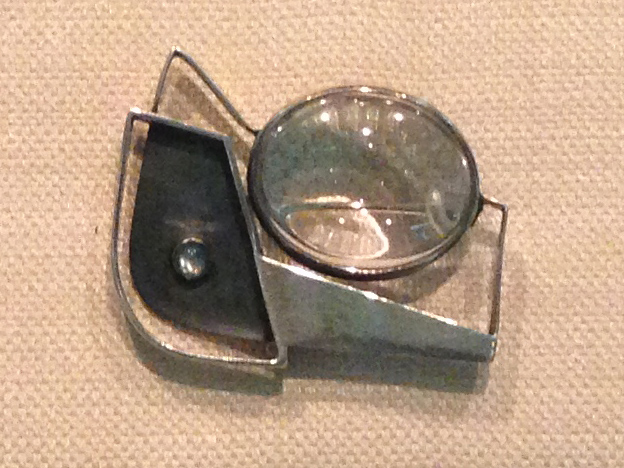
Brooch by Margaret De Patta showing transparent element.

Many architectonic pieces include flexible or moving elements, the better to reflect the physicality of the larger objects they are drawing inspiration from. Schocken described her pieces as "linear machines," further explaining that "movement plays an important part...[it] gives the brooch a life of its own even when not being worn...but when being held." In 1989, Gralnick released a series of necklaces that incorporated spools, pulleys, and cranks, highlighting the physics and mechanics of movement. The architect Eva Eisler created a series of jewellery pieces in the 1990s which used only tension to hold the parts together. Liv Blåvarp contrasted hard and soft elements by stringing sculpted wood on flexible threads, permitting movement despite the hard surface of the wood.

Architectonic pieces may also use varied depths to create a sense of the object as three-dimensional. For example, pieces created by Margaret de Patta, such as the brooch pictured, often include transparent elements that serve as "windows" to opaque structures lying beneath.

=== Materials ===
As a subset of modernist jewellery, architectonic jewellery frequently makes use of materials and textures not traditionally employed in crafting jewellery. Stainless steel and niobium are reminiscent of industrial design. Designer Lisa Gralnick made use of black acrylic sheets to create pieces that suggested missiles or submarines. Other artists have incorporated rubber, wood, concrete, plastics, and various non-precious metals to simulate architectural forms.

When more traditional materials such as gold or silver are used, they are often worked in ways that produce non-traditional textures. For example, English jeweler Gerda Flockinger would melt down the surfaces of her pieces to create unusual textures typically not seen in traditional jewellery. A 1999 article in Modern Silver magazine described how Patricia Tormey "slammed molten gold between layers of textured charcoal and dropped it into a tray of lentils." Michael Becker was known to file or score the surfaces of his brooches to emphasize his architectural references. German-Irish jeweller Rudolf Heltzel extensively polished the surfaces of his jewellery as a visual reference to industrial engineering. Overall, the objective is to produce innovative and abstract textures that reminded the viewer of industrial processes and architecture.

== See also ==
- Art jewelry
- Studio craft
- Modernism
