= Robert Lee Morris =

American jewelry designer and sculptor (born 1947)

- Born: 1947 (age 78–79); Nuremberg, Germany
- Occupations: Jewelry Designer, sculptor
- Website: https://robertleemorrisgallery.com

Robert Lee Morris (born 1947) is an American jewelry designer and sculptor, who attributes much of his inspiration to organic forms he admires in nature and to designing for an imaginary futuristic society. His designs have been made in gold, silver and bronze and he is known for his 24 carat matte gold plating and rich deep red copper and green patina. He has collaborated or designed collections for fashion designers Geoffrey Beene, Kansai Yamamoto, Calvin Klein, Anne Klein, Karl Lagerfeld, Michael Kors and Donna Karan. Morris was awarded the Coty Award (1981) and the Geoffrey Beene Lifetime Achievement Award by the CFDA Awards (2007).

== Early life and education ==
He was born in 1947 in Nuremberg, Germany, where his parents were stationed after the end of World War II. His father was in the US Air Force. They were also stationed in Japan when he was nine for four years and later in Rio de Janeiro, Brazil. He graduated from Beloit College with honors in 1969. In early adulthood he eventually settled down in Bellows Falls, Vermont, living on a commune and learning about metal working.

Morris was discovered in 1971 by New York gallery owner Joan Sonnabend and first exhibited his work at her art jewelry outpost in the Plaza Hotel called, Sculpture to Wear.

== Career ==
=== Artwear Gallery ===
Shortly after the closing of Sculpture to Wear in 1977, he opened the first edition of Artwear Gallery at 28 East 74th Street on the Upper East Side, near the couture district on Madison Avenue. Artwear Gallery relocated to SoHo in August 1978 where it would be surrounded by contemporary art galleries. The new location also gained new celebrity clientele, including Issey Miyake, Geoffrey Beene, Madonna, Cher, Bianca Jagger, Janet Jackson, Oprah Winfrey, among others. Jewelry designers shown at Artwear Gallery, besides Morris included Ted Muehling and Cara Croninger. Morris own jewelry work in the 1980s was known as, "modern urban warrior pieces" and tapped into primitivism.

=== Other work ===
A few years later a second, larger location opened nearby, followed by another on Madison Avenue in what is now the Sony building. A location on Königsallee in Düsseldorf, Germany was short-lived. Morris closed Artwear in 1995 and the RLM Robert Lee Morris Gallery opened in September 1995 at 400 West Broadway, focusing exclusively on Morris's own work.

His career took off after he appeared on the cover of Vogue in 1976. His work has appeared in over a dozen issues Vogue magazines.

In 1985 he worked with fashion designer Donna Karan for her first collection, they paired Karan's sleek, monochromatic, luxurious fabric clothing designs with his organic, oversized, and sculptural gold jewelry. He has collaborated with many leading fashion designers, including Geoffrey Beene, Karl Lagerfeld, Kansai Yamamoto, Calvin Klein, Anne Klein, and Michael Kors. Morris has designed Karan's perfume bottle, "Gold" for Estée Lauder. He also designed a special edition lipstick and compact for Elizabeth Arden in 1990.

In the 1990s through the 2000s, Morris created a fine jewelry line called RLM Collection on QVC. He has a presence on QVC television, selling RLM Studio, designed exclusively for QVC.

In 2007, Morris was the first jewelry designer to be awarded the Geoffrey Beene Lifetime Achievement Award from the Council of Fashion Designers of America (CFDA). He won the Coty Award in 1981 for his collection for Calvin Klein. He has received two other CFDA Awards for accessory design, in 1985 and 1994.

In 2008, Morris developed a jewelry collection for Mary Kate and Ashley Olsen's clothing line, Elizabeth & James.

In 2011, Manhattan-based, Haskell Jewels, LLC announced its acquisition of Robert Lee Morris.

Morris launched his Soho line at national department stores in September 2012. His higher end Collection line was launched in September 2012 at fine retailers nationwide. The Collection launched with Morris's first national ad campaign in American fashion magazines, including Vogue, W Magazine and Elle.

In 2017, MAC Cosmetics collaborated with Morris on a limited collection of products.
