= Annelies Strba =

Swiss multimedia artist (born 1947)

Annelies Štrba
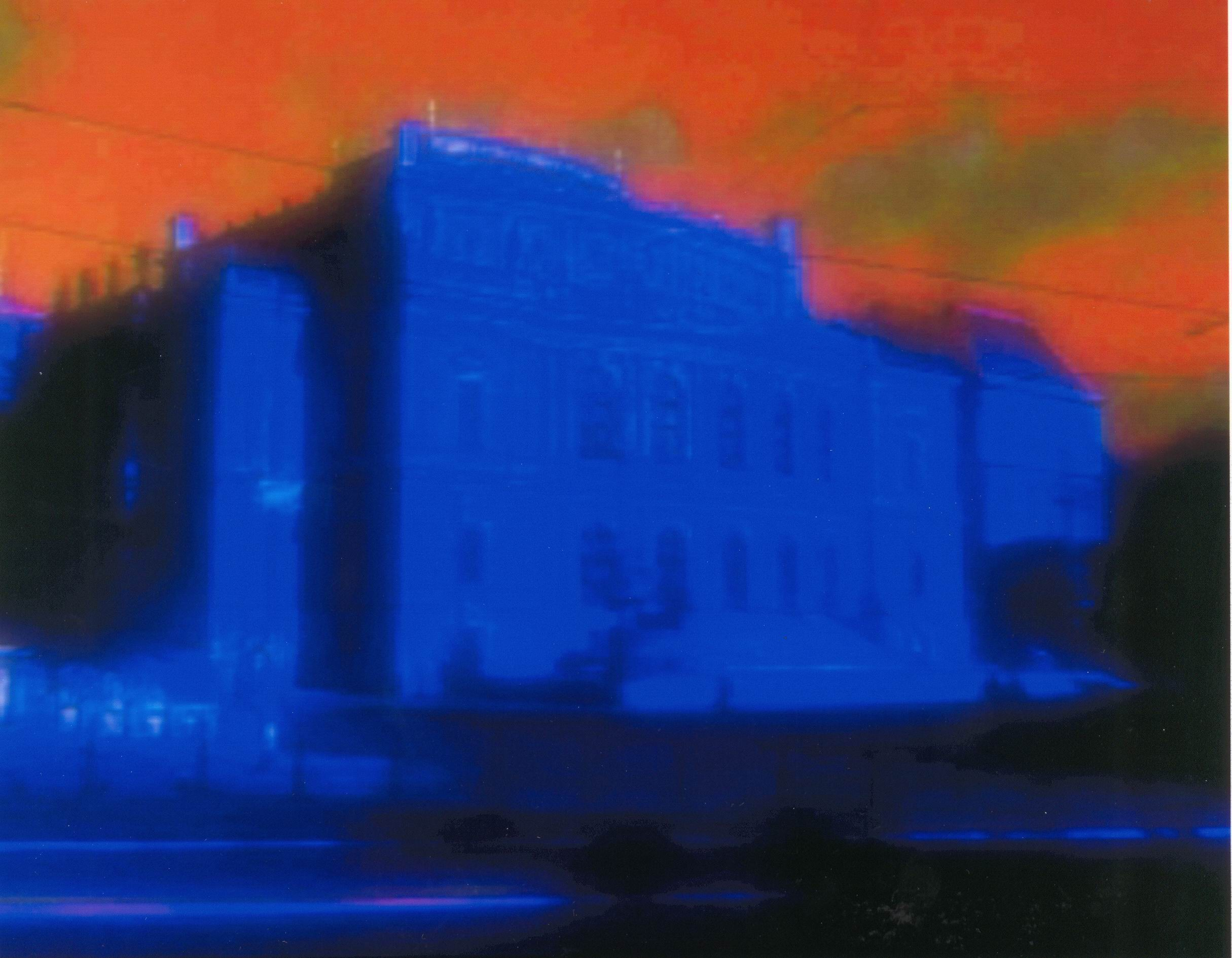
- Born: 7 October 1947; Zug, Switzerland
- Known for: Photography, Video Art
- Spouse: Bernhard Schobinger

Annelies Štrba (born 7 October 1947) is a Swiss multimedia artist, who lives in the Zurich metropolitan area. She works with video, photography, and digital media to approach her subjects, which range from domestically themed images, portraiture, and both urban and natural landscapes.

== Life ==
Annelies Štrba was born in Zug, Switzerland in 1947. She now lives in Richterswil (Lake Zurich) and Ascona, Switzerland. She started showing her work in 1990, and has participated in many group shows alongside other artists known for their portrayals of family, society, and everyday subjects, such as Nan Goldin, Shirin Neshat, Pipilotti Rist and Wolfgang Tillmans. She has traveled internationally for her work, spending time in Japan, Poland, Scotland, Paris, and England, amongst other places. She received a Federal Grant for Applied Art in 1971 and has exhibited widely in Europe, primarily in Switzerland, Germany, Italy, Austria, and France, as well as in the United States.

== Work ==
Štrba combines photography, digital media, and film to chronicle her physical and emotional life. A mother of three, she has been documenting her family environment through her work for over four decades. Her best-known bodies of work, Shades of Time, AYA, NYIMA, and her most recent publication, Noonday, depict her immediate family including her three children, and five grandchildren. Although she is working with subject matter that is very personal and quite literally close to home, Štrba constructs a quality of fantastical narrative in her pictures, utilizing combinations of the different mediums in her repertoire. While creating images that evoke fantastical emotion using technological processes, she simultaneously embraces a sense from 19th-century romanticism while addressing themes of domesticity and nature.

Štrba uses a digital camera to capture moments and figures in film and still, which she then colors with the aid of computer programs. This digital manipulation provides Štrba's images with a sense of painterliness and allows her to abandon naturalism and realist details in favor of complex visual textures. She often photographs around the family homes just outside of Zurich or in the Swiss mountains, where they spend many weekends and holidays. The product is a personal and poetically abstract documentation of the life around her, capturing her subjects at the dining room table, grooming, in the chaos of untidy rooms, or surrounded by nature. Overall, a personal story is told of the intertwined lives and relationships, speaking to memories, reactions, and nostalgic realization.
