= Peter Dormer =

British art critic and historian (1949–1996)

Peter Andrew Dormer (January 1, 1949 – December 24, 1996) was a British art critic and author.

== Biography ==
Peter Andrew Dormer was born in Fakenham, Norfolk on January 1, 1949. Spending his infancy in an army hut used for emergency housing after World War II, in 1955, his family moved to a council estate in northern Cambridgeshire. Dormer attended Impington Village College, then the Bath School of Art and Design, and then Manchester. He also attended Bristol University from 1969 to 1972.

In 1975, Dormer married Jane Smith. He worked as a teacher and in local government, serving as a Labour councillor in Ealing from 1978 to 1982. In 1978, he began contributing to Art Monthly, becoming a full-time writer in the early 1980s. He was honored by the University of East Anglia in 1995 when they appointed him the college's first Fellow in Critical Appreciation in the Arts and Design.

In 1987, Dormer released The New Furniture: Trends and Tradition via Thames & Hudson. This was followed in 1990 by The Meanings of Modern Design, which The Independent called "an original look at the complex relations designers have with consumers and at the symbolism, metaphor and morality of product styling." He died in London on December 24, 1996 from cancer and was survived by his wife and no children.

== Publications ==
- Dormer, Peter (1985). The New Jewelry: Trends & Traditions. Thames & Hudson Ltd. ISBN 978-0-500-23406-8.
- Dormer, Peter (1986). The New Ceramics: Trends and Traditions. Thames & Hudson Ltd. ISBN 978-0-500-23468-6.
- Dormer, Peter (1987). The New Furniture: Trends and Tradition. Thames & Hudson Ltd. ISBN 978-0-500-23492-1.
- Meanings in Modern Design (1990)
- Dormer, Peter (1990). Jasper Morrison: Designs, Projects and Drawings, 1981–1989. Architecture Design and Technology Press. ISBN 978-1-85454-435-3. OCLC 901561363.
- Design since 1945 (1993)
- The Art of the Maker (1994)
- Jewelry of our Time (with Helen Drutt) (1995)
