= Florence Koehler =

American artist (1861 – 1944)

- Born: November 8, 1861; Jackson, Michigan, United States
- Died: May 4, 1944 (aged 82); Rome, Italy
- Occupation(s): Craftswoman, designer and jeweler
- Notable work: founding member of the Chicago Arts and Crafts Society

Florence Koehler (1861 – 1944) was an American craftswoman, designer and jeweler. She was one of the best-known jewelers of the Arts and Crafts movement that flourished in the late 19th and early 20th centuries.

== Biography ==
Florence Cary was born on November 8, 1861 in Jackson, Michigan to Harriet (née Banker) and Benjamin F. Cary. She grew up in Missouri and moved to Kansas City in 1881. She married Frederick Koehler and was Head of the Ceramics Department at Kansas City Art School by 1893. They moved to Chicago where she exhibited her ceramics at the World's Columbian Exposition. She briefly ran an interior decorating business out of the Marshall Field and Company Building with her friend Mrs. E. W. Sheridan.

Koehler was a founding member of the Chicago Arts and Crafts Society and taught jewelry and metalsmithing. She also taught china painting to women from the Atlan Ceramic Art Club in the 1890s and was credited with turning the club's technical gifts "to a rare standard of beauty, excellence, and originality." She traveled to London in March 1898, where she studied enamelwork and jewelry with Alexander Fisher. Afterwards her work made reference to historic designs, particularly those of the Renaissance period.

Koehler separated from her husband sometime after 1900. She was the traveling companion of Emily Crane Chadbourne and the pair settled in London where Koehler retained a studio in Kensington. There she was acquainted with Alice Stopford Green, Arthur Bowen Davies, Augustus John, Lady Ottoline Morrell, Henry James, and Roger Quilter. Beginning in 1912, she moved to Paris and lived in Place des Vosges where she befriended Henri Matisse. Koehler met arts patron Mary Elizabeth Sharpe in 1920.

She moved to Rome in the 1930s. In January 1944, her health failed and she was taken to a clinic where she was diagnosed with cancer. She died in Rome on May 4, 1944. Koehler left her possessions to Sharpe, who arranged a posthumous exhibition of her work in 1948. Collections of her jewelry and paintings were donated to the Rhode Island School of Design and Everson Museum of Art, respectively. A collection of her papers and correspondence is held by the Arthur and Elizabeth Schlesinger Library on the History of Women in America at Harvard.

== Works ==
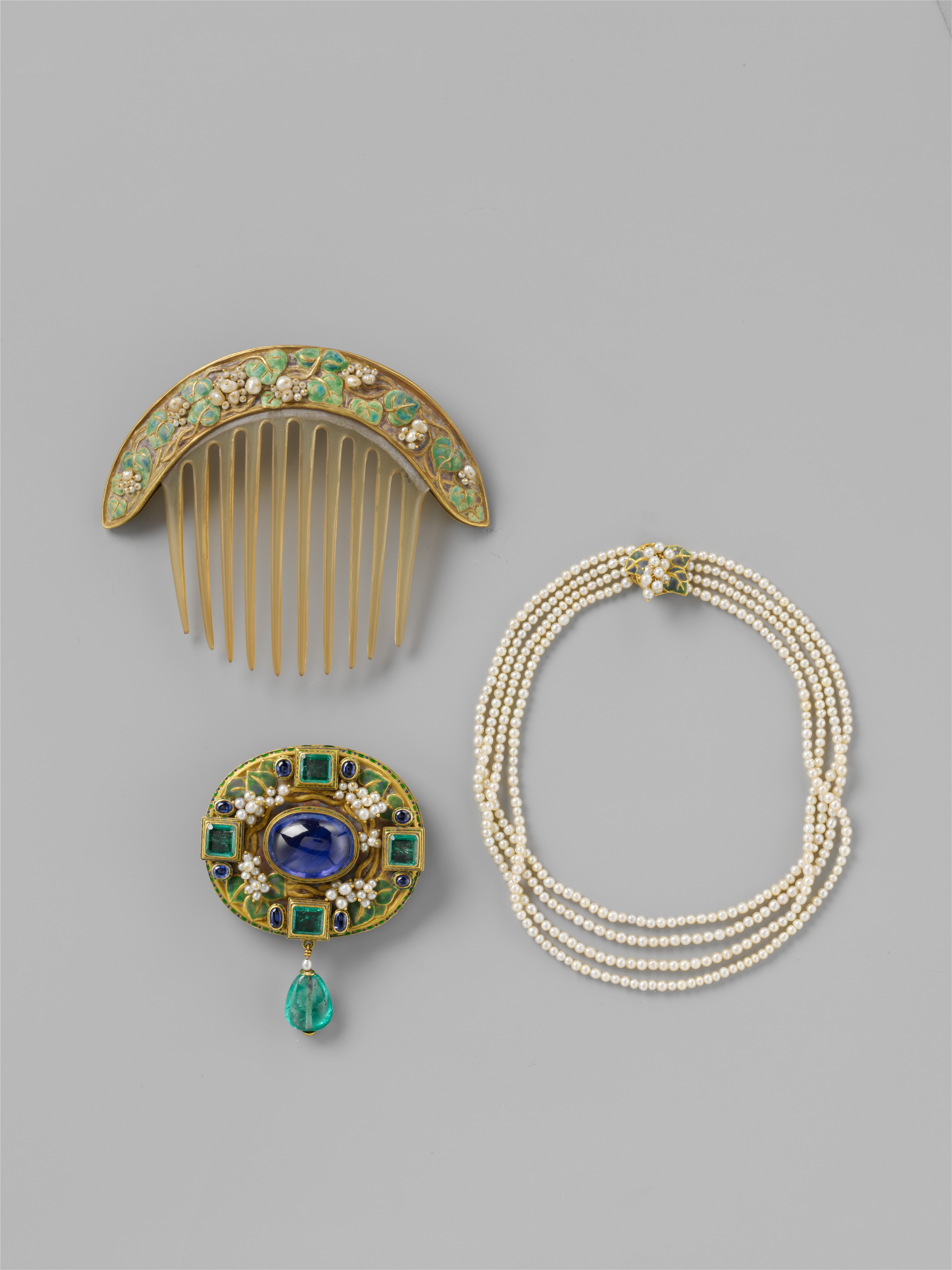
Jewelry set of hair comb, pin, and necklace designed by Florence.

Koehler started out as a potter and began making jewelry in earnest following her trip to London. In addition to her jewelry, she also produced a number of drawings and paintings. For her jewelry, Koehler tailored her designs and choice of gemstones to her clients, favoring cabochons over faceted stones. Her "leafy designs set with informal groupings of gems in 18-carat gold" earned her an international reputation. Art critic Roger Fry praised her work, writing in The Burlington Magazine in 1910 that "[i]t is in the imaginative and definitely poetic quality that Mrs. Koehler's jewellery marks such an important moment in the modern revival of craftsmanship."
