= Anna Hu =

Europe-based Asian contemporary jewelry artist

- 胡茵菲
- Born: 1977 (age 48–49); Tainan City, Taiwan
- Education: Fashion Institute of Technology; Parsons School of Design; Columbia University; Harvard University
- Occupation: Jewelry Artist
- Years active: 2007–present
- Website: www.annahu.com

Anna Hu (Chinese: 胡茵菲; pinyin: Hú Yīnfēi; born 1977) is a Europe-based Asian contemporary jewelry artist.

== Early life ==
Anna Hu was born in 1977 in Taiwan into a family involved in the jewelry trade. During her childhood, she was exposed to gemstones through her father, a diamond merchant. In her youth, she studied the cello and later pursued formal musical training in the United States at the Walnut Hill School for the Arts and the New England Conservatory of Music.

She later discontinued her musical studies due to shoulder tendinitis and subsequently shifted her focus to jewelry and gemology.

Hu earned a Graduate Gemologist (G.G.) diploma from the Gemological Institute of America (GIA) and completed the jewelry design program at the Fashion Institute of Technology (FIT). She later pursued graduate studies at Parsons School of Design and Columbia University, receiving master’s degrees in art history and arts administration.

In 2025, Hu completed the Owner/President Management (OPM) program at Harvard Business School.

== Career ==
Hu interned at the auction house Christie’s and subsequently worked at Van Cleef & Arpels and Harry Winston. During her tenure at Harry Winston, she worked within the team led by Chief Jewelry Designer Maurice Galli.

In 2007, Hu founded her eponymous jewelry brand, Anna Hu Haute Joaillerie, in New York.

The brand maintains operations associated with New York, Paris, and Monaco.

== Auction records ==
Hu’s works have appeared in several major international auctions.

In May 2013, at Christie’s Hong Kong, her Jadeite Orpheus Ring, set with a 45.39-carat jadeite, sold for US$2.59 million.

AN EXCEPTIONAL JADEITE AND MULTI-GEM 'ORPHEUS' RING, BY ANNA HU | Christie's

In November 2013, at Christie’s Geneva, her Côte d’Azur Brooch, set with a 58.29-carat sapphire, sold for US$4,568,163.

THE UNIQUE SAPPHIRE AND MULTI-GEM 'CÔTE D'AZUR' BROOCH, BY ANNA HU | Christie's

In October 2019, at Sotheby’s Hong Kong, her Dunhuang Pipa Necklace, featuring a 100.02-carat fancy vivid yellow diamond, sold for US$5.78 million.

Sotheby's Hong Kong jewellery auction sets world record

== Museum acquisitions ==
Hu’s works have entered the permanent collections of several museums.

In 2018, China Red Magpie Brooch was acquired by the State Historical Museum at the Moscow Kremlin.

In 2022, The Yin Yang Hand Ornament, originally created in 2010 as a commission by artist Cindy Sherman, entered the permanent collection of the Musée des Arts décoratifs in Paris following a donation by Sherman.

In 2024, The Enchanted Ania Brooch was acquired by the Museum of Fine Arts, Boston.

In 2024, Enchanted White Lily Bangle I entered the permanent collection of the British Museum, London.

In 2025, Gnossienne Brooch was acquired by the Musée Guimet in Paris.

In 2026, Dance of Dunhuang Brooch entered the permanent collection of the Victoria and Albert Museum in London.

== Red carpet appearances ==
Hu’s jewelry has been worn at international film and cultural events.

Individuals who have worn her jewelry include Madonna, Natalie Portman, Gwyneth Paltrow, Hilary Swank, Scarlett Johansson, Naomi Watts, Emily Blunt, and Oprah Winfrey.
