= Moiseikin Jewellery House =

Jewelry production company from Ekaterinburg

Moiseikin
- Industry: jewellery, luxury goods
- Founded: 1993 in Yekaterinburg
- Founder: Viktor Moiseikin
- Website: www.moiseikin.com

Moiseikin is a Russian rooted jewellery production company headquartered in Hong Kong. The production is mainly based on minerals and gems that are mined in the Ural Mountains.

== The company ==
The company was founded in 1993 by businessman Viktor Moiseikin and is named after him.

Moiseikin has developed and patented internationally some technologies of jewellery production such as Waltzing Brilliance. According to Rapaport Magazine, "this technology both secures the diamonds and allows them to rotate gently around the axis created by the two points of contact"—and "this is the first patented jewelry invention for Russia in the past 100 years".

The company showcases its works at international luxury exhibitions. It also provides prizes for ceremonies such as "Person of the Year" business event held annually in Ekaterinburg.

Since 2019, the company has expanded into China.

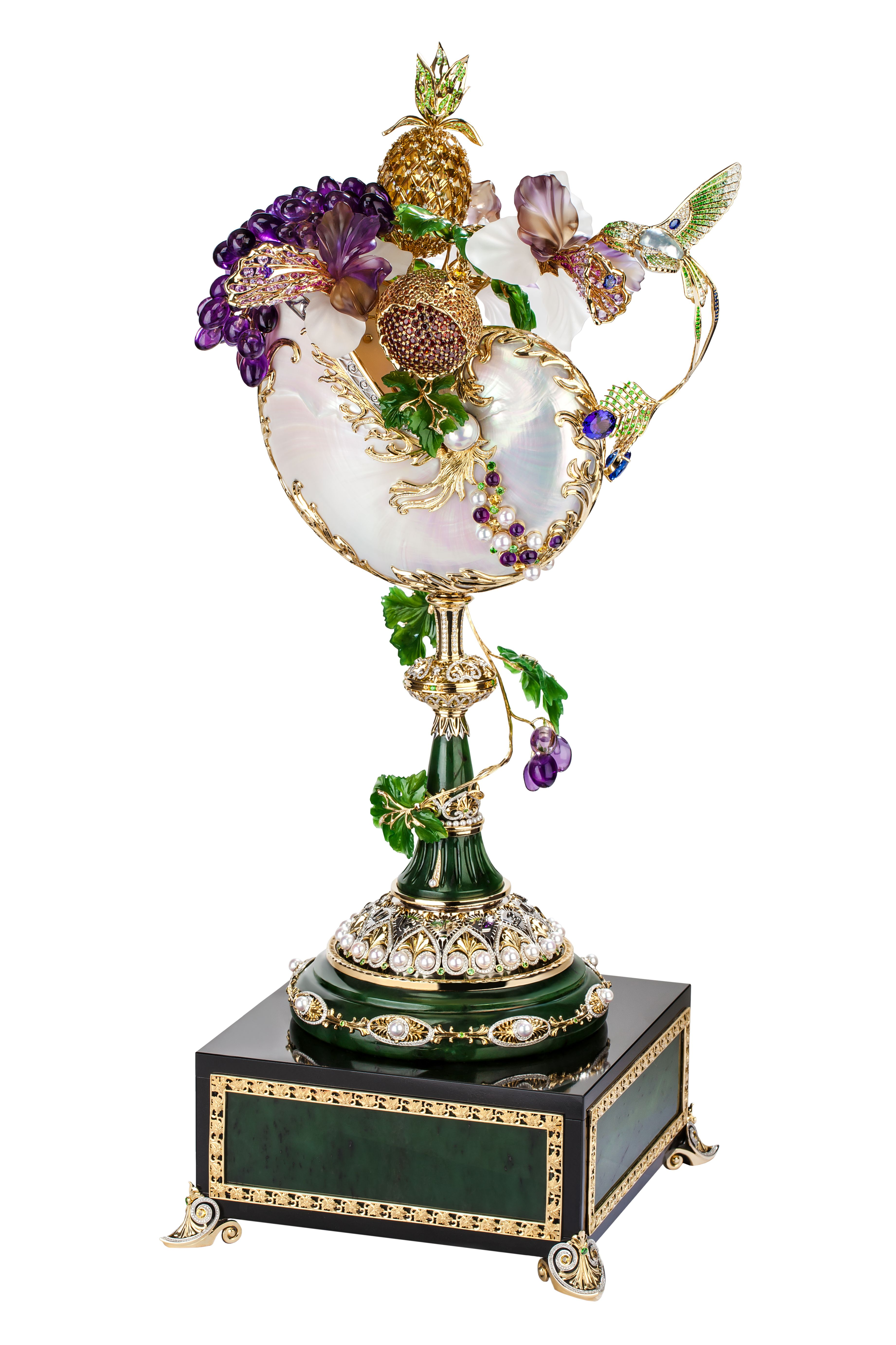
"Cornucopia": the "million-dollar-clock" by Moiseikin

== Examples ==
In 2005 the company exhibited a "million-dollar-clock" at Dubai International Jewellery Week in Dubai. As reported by Dubai press, the item weighs over 65 kg, includes over 2,000 diamonds, other jewels and a kilogram worth of gold.

In 2014 the company presented a massive souvenir made of marble depicting former and acting Russian presidents Dmitry Medvedev and Vladimir Putin playing chess.
