= Bernhard Schobinger =

Swiss artist jeweler (born 1946)

- Born: 18 January 1946; Zürich, Switzerland
- Education: School of Applied Arts, Zürich
- Occupation: Jewelry designer
- Known for: Art jewelry
- Spouse: Annelies Štrba
- Awards: Françoise van den Bosch Award (1998); Swiss Federal Design Award (2007)
- Website: schobinger.ch

Bernhard Schobinger (born 18 January 1946) is a Swiss contemporary artist jeweler.

== Early life and education ==
Born in Zurich, Bernhard Schobinger attended the Zurich's School of Applied Arts for two years, followed an apprenticeship, between 1963 and 1967, at Goldsmiths, a retailer in England.

== Career ==
In 1968, he opened a workshop–gallery in Richterswil and started to produce his own work. In the 1980s, he spent periods of time in Berlin, London, and New York City.

Throughout his career as an art jeweler, Schobinger has blurred the lines between applied and fine arts. His esthetic echoes concrete art mainly under the influence of Max Bill, the punk culture of the 1970s, Italian Arte Povera and Neo-Dada.

Often playing with contrasts, Schobinger's single pieces are made of material which varies greatly from recycled objects and pieces inherited from his mother to precious metals and gemstones. Broken glasses, scissors or rusty material are used in a provocative way, making jewelry a means for a narrative on material culture.

As the art historian Roger Fayet put it, "His works are based not on 'neither-nor' but rather on 'both... and', on juxtaposition and interpolation. What comes out of this is – despite all this use of rubbish – jewellery of extraordinary richness: rich in materials and forms, rich in qualities that are sensorily perceived and, most importantly, rich in meanings and wit".

Schobinger has been invited as a visiting lecturer at universities and academies, including the Royal College of Art in London; Hiko Mizuno College of Jewelry in Tokyo; the Rhode Island School of Design in Providence, Rhode Island; the Gerrit Rietveld Academie in Amsterdam; and the Haute Ecole d'Arts Appliqués in Geneva.

== Awards ==
His work has received awards including:

- 1971 Diamonds-International Award, New York
- 1972 Deutscher Schmuck-und Edelsteinpreis
- 1994 Werkbeitrag des Kantons und der Stadt Luzern
- 1998 The Françoise van den Bosch Award
- 2007 Swiss Design Award

== Museum collections ==
- Aargauer Kunsthaus, Aarau, Switzerland
- Corning Museum of Glass, Corning, New York, United States
- Gemeentemuseum Den Haag, Den Haag, The Netherlands
- Grassimuseum, Leipzig, Germany
- Musée des Arts Decoratifs, Palais du Louvre, Paris, France
- Museum of Design, Zürich, Zürich, Switzerland
- Museum of Fine Arts, Boston, Boston, Massachusetts, United States
- Die Neue Sammlung, The International Design Museum, Munich, Germany
- Rhode Island School of Design Museum, Providence, Rhode Island, United States
- Royal College of Art, London, United Kingdom
- Swiss National Museum, Zürich, Switzerland
- Stedelijk Museum, Amsterdam, the Netherlands
- Museum of Fine Arts, Houston, Houston, Texas, United States
- Landesmuseum Württemberg, Stuttgart, Germany
- Victoria and Albert Museum, London, United Kingdom
- Museum für Angewandte Kunst Köln, Cologne, Germany
- Museum of Design, Zürich, Zürich, Switzerland
- National Museum of Art, Architecture and Design, Oslo, Norway
- National Gallery of Australia, Canberra, Australia

== Bibliographical references ==
1. Wilhelm Lindeman, ed. Gemstone/Art. Renaissance to the Present Day. Arnoldsche Art Publishers, 2016. (ISBN 978-3-89790-465-1)
2. Glenn Adamson, "Bernhard Schobinger: The Rings of Saturn", Arnoldische Art Publishers, Stuttgart, Germany 2013. (ISBN 978-3-89790-402-6)
3. Roger Fayet and others, "Bernhard Schobinger: Jewels Now", Stuttgart: Arnoldsche Art Publishers, Stuttgart, Germany 2003. (ISBN 978-3-89790-183-4)
4. "Ornament as art" The Museum of Fine Arts, Houston, USA, Arnoldische Art Publishers, Stuttgart, Germany 2007. (ISBN 978-3-89790-273-2)
5. Helen W. Drutt and Peter Dormer, "Jewelry of our time: Art, Ornament and Obsession", Thames&Hudson, London 1995. (ISBN 9780500016749)
6. David Watkins, "The Best in Contemporary Jewelry", Quarto Publishing plc, London 1993. (ISBN 2-88046-189-8)
