= Single-kitchen home =

Reform model for urban residential development

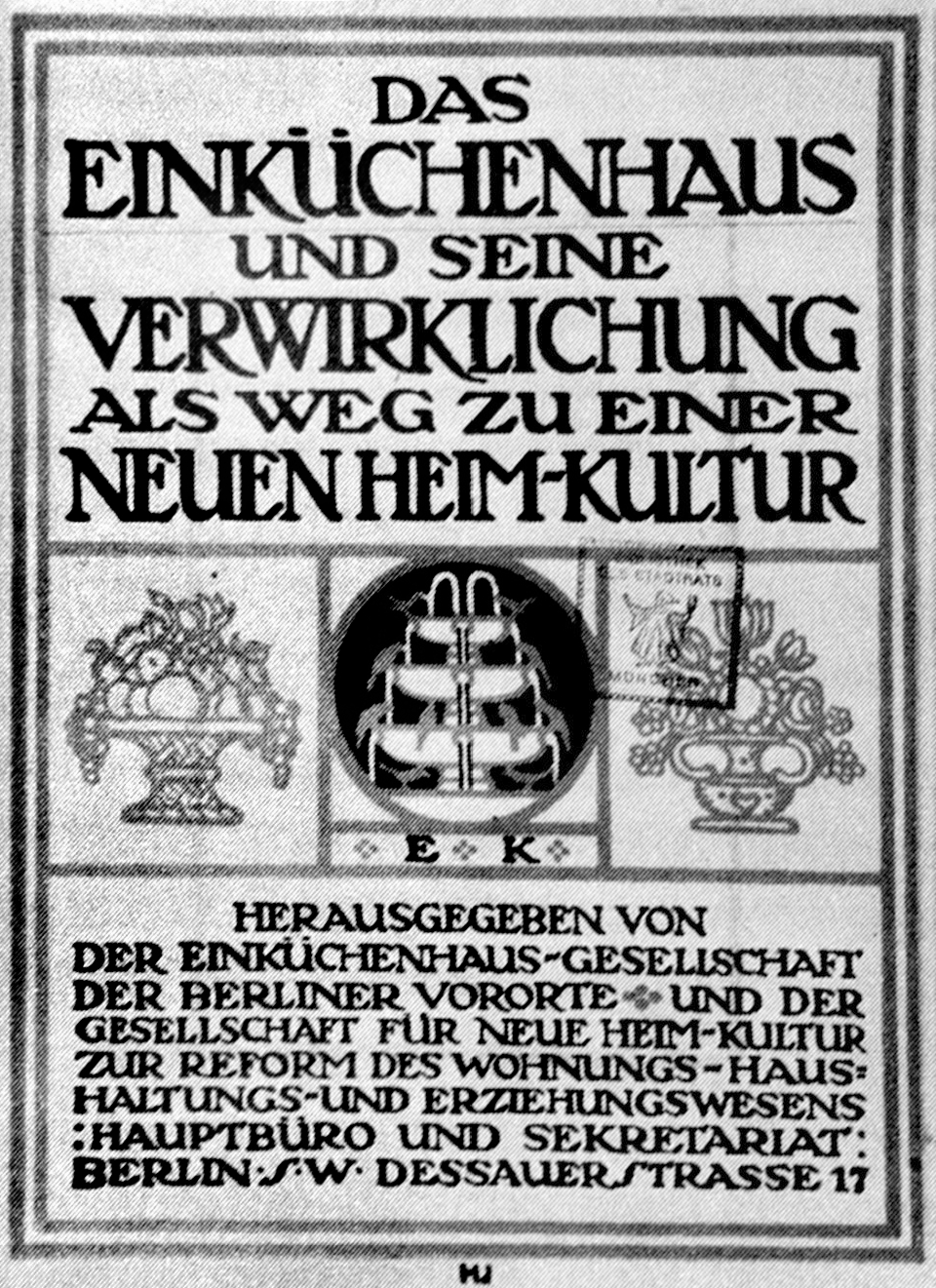
Advertising brochure of the Berliner Einküchenhaus-Gesellschaft, 1908

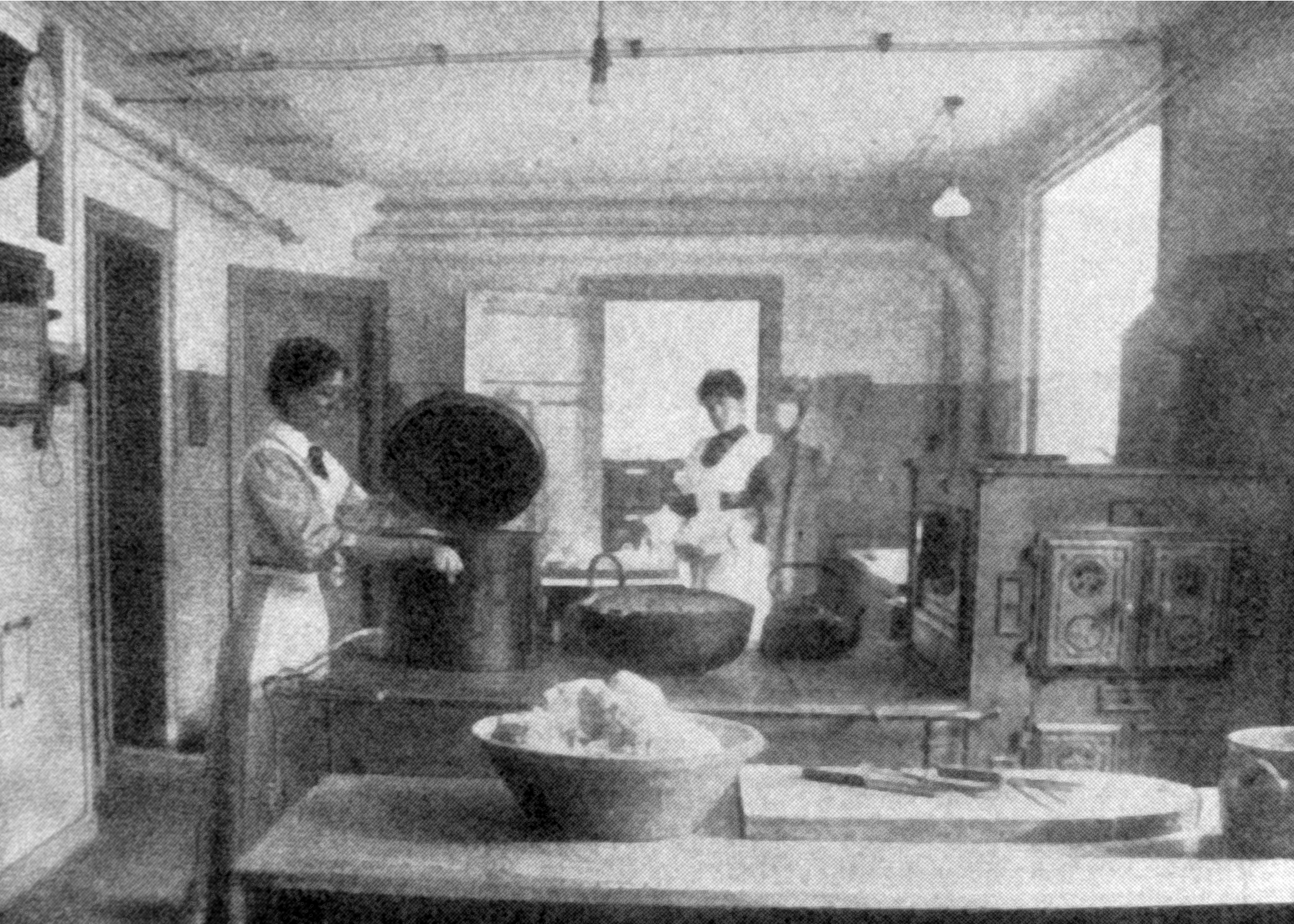
Central kitchen in the one-kitchen house, Copenhagen, 1907

The single-kitchen home was a reform model of urban residential development in which a centrally managed canteen kitchen within a multi-party house replaced the kitchens of the individual apartments. The concept was based on the ideas of the women's rights activist and social democrat Lily Braun. With the basic idea of liberating women from housework, at the beginning of the 20th century it was an explicit counter-design to the establishment of the isolated nuclear family in mass housing. Single-kitchen houses, sometimes also called central kitchen houses, were implemented in various European large cities in isolated and different ways until the 1950s. As key works of an idea of modern living, some of these buildings were nominated for the European Heritage Label in 2009, expressly as a network of common European architecture spread across various countries.

== The concept of the one-kitchen house ==
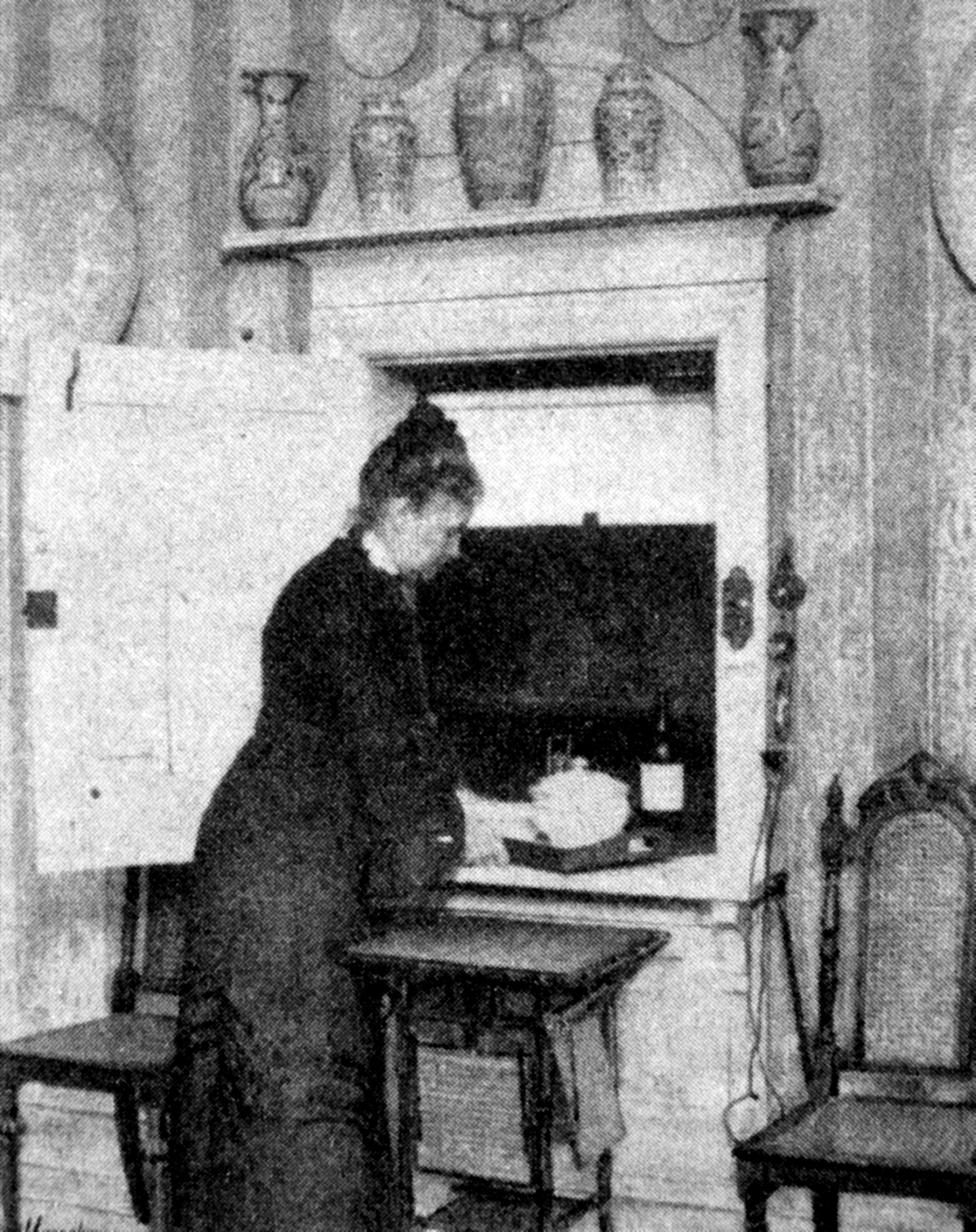
Essensentnahme am Speiseaufzug, Kopenhagen, 1907

The basic idea behind the single-kitchen houses was to set up a central kitchen within a multi-party house or complex of houses, with the simultaneous absence of private kitchens in the individual apartments. Instead, these were connected by a dumbwaiter and a house telephone to the supply facility, which was usually located in the basement or on the first floor. In many cases, the equipment consisted of contemporary modern appliances. The communal kitchen was run by paid staff, from whom meals and dishes could be ordered. Many of the houses also had central dining rooms and, depending on the design concept, the apartments were also equipped with sideboards and simple gas stoves for emergencies. In almost all of the single-kitchen houses built, there were also other communal facilities and services, such as roof terraces and laundry room, and in some cases also stores, libraries and kindergartens. The new housing facilities at the beginning of the 20th century included central heating, hot-water supply, garbage disposal and central vacuum cleaner systems with a domestic pipe system, and the residents had access to services in various ways.

Originally conceived as a reform idea in worker housing, in which the costs of communal facilities would be eliminated through savings in the layout of the housing and through centralized management, the realized projects were based on different forms of ownership and organization. Both on a private economy and cooperative basis, single-kitchen houses offered the better-off bourgeoisie an alternative model of living in the middle of the city. In contrast to other Reformkonzepte at the end of the 19th and beginning of the 20th century, such as the garden city movement, the cohesion of the residents was not achieved through shielding, but through social exchange with the surrounding urban environment.

== Historical prerequisites ==
=== The housing question in the 19th century ===
During industrialization in the second half of the 19th century and the accompanying massive population growth in the cities, there was a radical break with the pre-industrial way of living. The rural population moving to the industrial centers left their extended-family housing and supply structures. In the cities, they encountered increasing spatial, social and health problems, which were summarized under the term housing misery. Urban expansions and mass housing construction were speculative regulated via the market, as the social upheavals were embedded in a liberalization of the economic order. The housing shortage affected almost all city dwellers, but it seemed almost insoluble for non-permanent, i.e. not permanently employed and frequently changing the place of work, poorly paid workers and their families. The problems were the subject of constant criticism from labour movement organizations, as well as social policy associations, academics and housing reformers. The housing question became one of the central political issues of the late 19th and early 20th century.

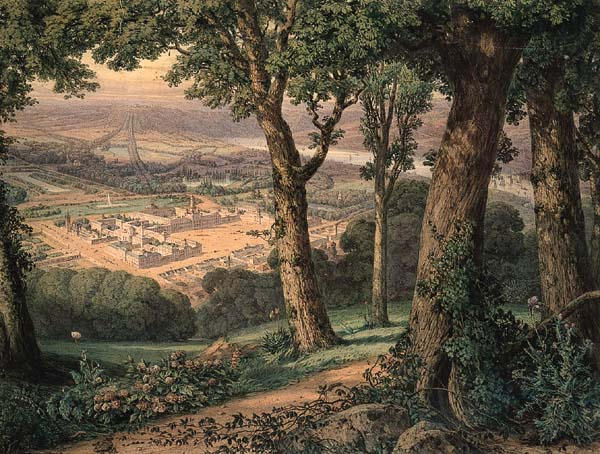
Dreamed Phalanstère, watercolor by Laurent Pelletier after drawings by Charles Fourier

The basic problem was to reduce the discrepancy between housing costs and the income of the working class. If one reduces the aspects of the housing issue to a socialist and a bourgeois labeling, the positions differed right from the start. For the workers' movement, the housing shortage was a class issue that could not be solved under capitalism, but only with the appropriation of the means of production through collective forms of housing. On the other hand, there was the position of the housing and social reform movement, which saw a moral, health and ethical problem in housing misery. Affordable and self-contained small apartments were to be created, in which a family division of labor would take place according to the bourgeois model, according to which the man would pursue employment and the woman would be responsible for housework. The home also had the function of an educational program for the proletariat:

We must get to the root of the problem and try to reconcile the miner with his rough, dull and difficult fate by providing him with a home. But how can one demand that girls who have spent the most beautiful years of their development in the mines and who have also adopted the ruthlessness and coarseness of the workers' mores along with their male attire, can co-found a domestic hearth and embellish it in such a way that the husband, father or brother returning from the dark womb of the earth prefers to take a step towards his hut rather than the inn?

— Leipziger Illustrierte Zeitung,

Solutions to the problem were seen in the subsidizing of capital costs in housing construction, the formation of cooperatives and even hire-purchase strategies for owner-occupied homes. The Social Democrats, on the other hand, did not develop any housing concepts of their own until well after the turn of the century, rejecting the models introduced by the women's movement and in particular by Lily Braun for single-family homes. After the process of transformation into the Democratic-Socialist Reform Party, it followed the guidelines already developed, modified by the demand for a state housing policy. In practice, the self-contained apartment prevailed for the nuclear family. for immigrants from the countryside and the proletariat, it was the visibly better form of housing with its private sphere and self-determined furnishings and organization.

=== The ideals of the Utopian Socialists ===
The utopian ideal of a community provided a template for the concept of one-kitchen houses. ideal of a community, which the early socialist social theorist Charles Fourier (1772–1837) had conceived with the model of the Phalanstère. Fourier drew the term from the Greek word Phalanx' (combat unit) and the Latin Monasterium ('monastic community'), and these very economic and living communities were to overcome the division of labor and the split between production and consumption, contrary to the capitalist economic system. Family households would be dissolved into communal houses with collective infrastructure, there would be public kitchens, dining rooms, schools, festival halls, recreation rooms, stores, libraries, music rooms and areas for children and the elderly. The models included equality for women and free sexuality.

The French factory owner Jean-Baptiste Godin (1817–1889), also a supporter of early socialism, took up Fourier's design and from 1859 realized a communal housing complex in the French municipality of Guise, next to his Iron Foundry and furnace factory. It offered space for 1500 people and consisted of three residential complexes, school buildings, a crèche, a bathhouse and a theater. In addition, there were the buildings of the Économat, a farmyard with kitchens, halls, restaurants, a pub, stores, a pigsty and a henhouse. In contrast to Fourier, Godin did not strive for the dissolution of the family, as he emphatically emphasized with his name. In theory, women were equal to men, but as they were not trusted to do the hard and dirty work in the factory, many of them remained unemployed. As a result, individual kitchens were soon installed in homes. In 1880 Godin transferred the entire complex, including the factory, to a cooperative, which existed until 1960.

As early as 1816 the British entrepreneur Robert Owen (1771–1858) founded an educational institution for the betterment of his employees, the Institution for the formation of Character, at his cotton mill in New Lanark, Scotland. He developed a model concept for industrial villages in which homes were built without kitchens. Instead, the preparation of food and the food itself was organized centrally and collectively. In 1825, Owen sold the factory in Scotland and went to the United States to implement his ideas more extensively. In the state of Indiana, he founded the settlement New Harmony, which offered space for around 1000 residents. However, its implementation failed due to both economic difficulties and personnel problems:

A very colorful bunch of life reformers had gathered in New Harmony, who created a 'discussion club' instead of the ideal society and soon left it again.

— Julius Posener

Just three years later, Owen sold the estate again. Opponents of the early socialist utopias saw their unfeasibility confirmed. Karl Marx analyzed the failure of the early socialist systems as not radical enough and at the same time too radical, because they demanded the leap into an ideal final state, but thought of this as insularly limited instead of society as a whole, they "see no historical self-activity on the part of the proletariat, no political movement peculiar to it."

=== The collectivization of the domestic economy ===
Despite their failure, the early socialists had a considerable impact on the concepts of utopian settlements with a centralized domestic economy that emerged from the middle of the 19th century and the attempts to implement them. In the US and in Europe, a network of various reformist and revolutionary tendencies developed that sought to reorient the division of labor, the domestic economy and forms of housing. Among them were representatives of the labor movement, the socialist and bourgeois women's movement in Germany, anarchists, feminists and the settlement movement in the US, supporters of architectural reform and the garden city movement in Great Britain and Germany.

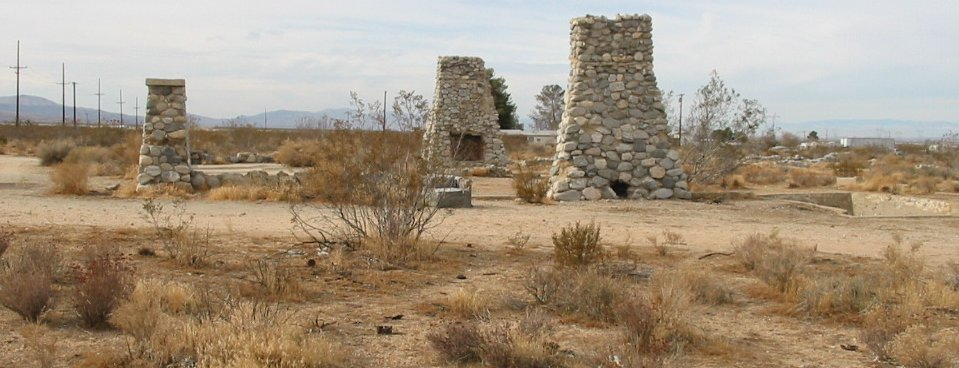
The ruins of the municipality of Llano del Rio

In Boston, the feminist Melusina Fay Peirce (1836–1923) planned a housewives' and production cooperative from 1868. She designed both the structural and conceptual background and coined the term cooperative housekeeping for her facility. In a community of 36 houses grouped around a courtyard based on neighborhood help, paid services such as cooking, washing and sewing were to be offered in a central workplace and a communal kitchen was to be set up. The project soon failed due to resistance from the husbands of the women involved. Peirce developed her experiences and findings further and published Co-operative Housekeeping: How not to do it and How to do it in 1884. The concept of the household cooperative was taken up by the feminist writer Marie Stevens Howland (1836–1921) and further developed around 1890 by Mary Coleman Stuckert, who attempted to establish a model of urban row houses with central communal spaces, a central kitchen and cooperative childcare in Denver. The architect Alice Constance Austin (1868-unknown) also took her cue from Peirce when she designed a complete urban development plan on a cooperative basis with centralized housekeeping in Palmdale, California from 1910 with the Llano del Rio project. The commune existed from 1915 to 1918. Influence on the European one-kitchen house movement is also attributed to the American writer Charlotte Perkins Gilman (1860–1935), who around 1900 described her radical concepts of the innovation of gender relations, family and household in both theoretical treatises and novels.

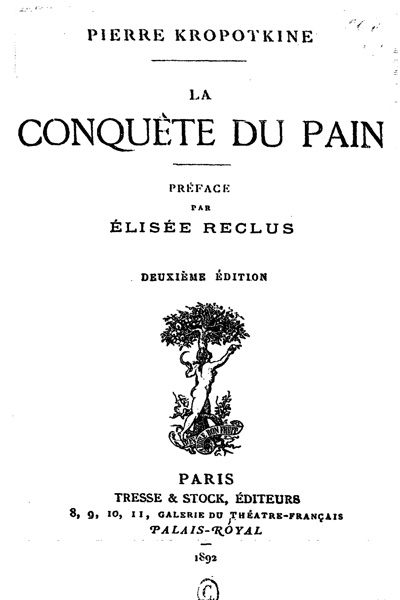

The first German written reflections on collective housework can be found in the work of the women's rights activist Hedwig Dohm (1831–1919). In her publication Der Jesuitismus im Hausstande (1873), she argued that due to the historical development of industrialization and the division of labour, the domestic economy was losing more and more of its content and the trend was towards centralization:

The time is approaching when the army fire will be extinguished in the middle and lower classes, only to blaze all the brighter in grand public kitchens

— Hedwig Dohm

August Bebel, in his 1878 publication Die Frau und der Sozialismus, known as the classic of emancipation theory, also outlined a vision of society in which the private household was to be dissolved, food preparation, clothing and the education of children organized in collective institutions outside the home and an end put to the great waste of time, energy, heating and lighting materials and food.

For millions of women, the private kitchen is one of the most exhausting, time-consuming and wasteful facilities, which deprives them of health and good humor and is a matter of daily concern, especially when, as in the vast majority of families, resources are the scarcest. The elimination of the private kitchen will be a salvation for countless women.

— August Bebel

The Russian anarchist Pyotr Alexeyevich Kropotkin is also regarded as the father of the idea of the central household. In the discourse history of the one-kitchen house, reference is made to Kropotkin in various treatises over the decades, including by Lily Braun and Henry van de Velde. Nevertheless, this background is often not mentioned to conceal "any connection with the unsubtle past of the one-kitchen houses". It is above all Kropotkin's memorable criticism of the individual household that is widely quoted:

Between 12 and 2 o'clock there must be 20 million Americans and just as many Englishmen, all eating roast beef or mutton, pork, potatoes and vegetables. And 8 million ovens are burning for 2 to 3 hours to roast all the meat and cook the vegetables, 8 million women spend time preparing the meals, which may only consist of 10 different dishes all together. ... Liberating women does not just mean opening the doors of the university, the court or parliament to them. ... Rather, liberating women means freeing them from the brutal work of cooking and washing, means making arrangements that allow them to bring up their children, if they wish, and to take part in social life.

— Peter Kropotkin

Kropotkin's influence arose not only from his theoretical work, but also from his role as an intermediary in various circles. He was a frequent guest at Jane Addams's Hull House in Chicago, had contacts with English art reformers, where he met Lilly Braun, the German Garden City Society and considerable influence on Ebenezer Howard, the founder of Letchworth Garden City.

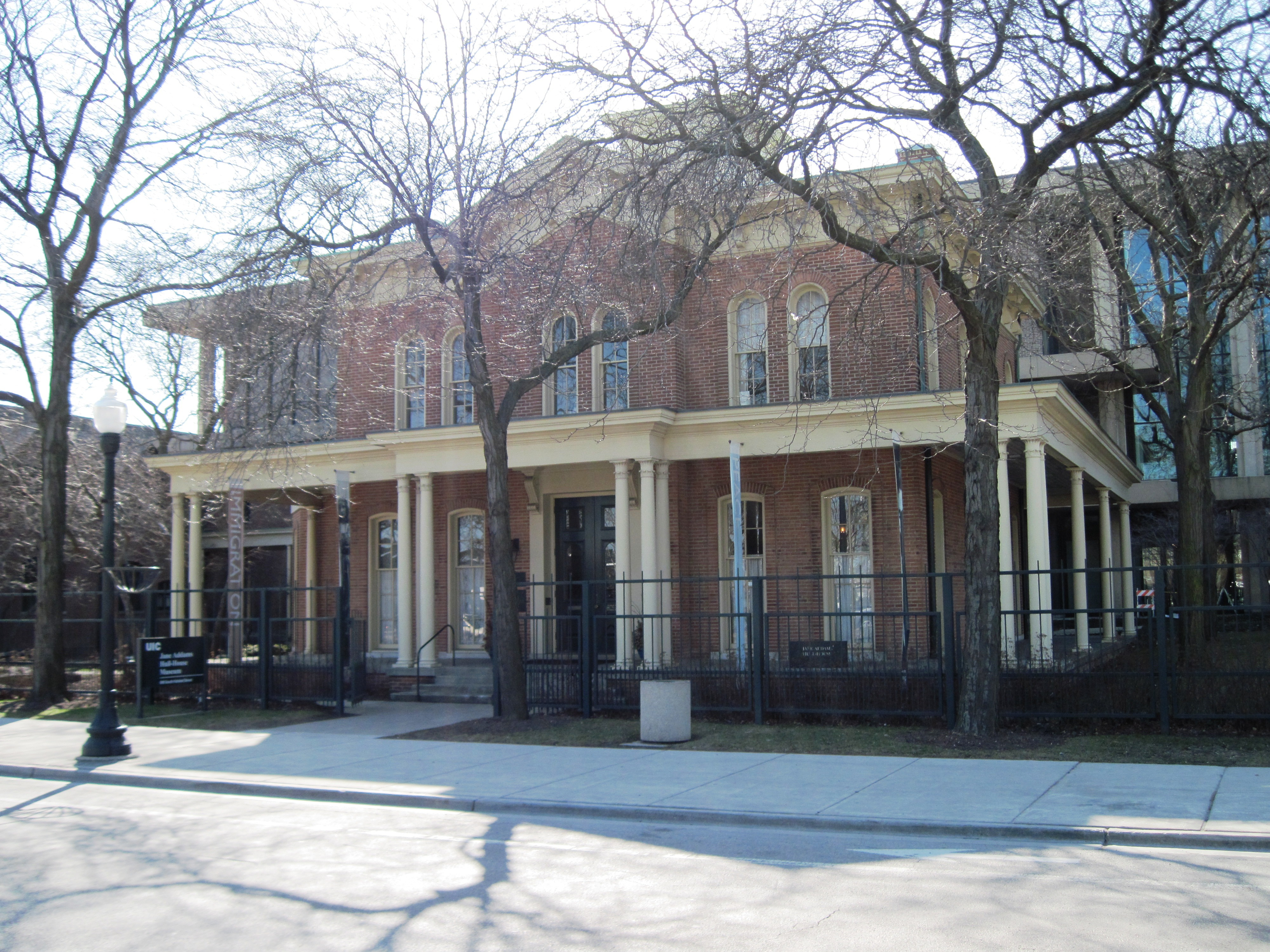
Hull House Chicago, 2010

=== The influence of Hull House, Chicago ===
A particular influence on the concepts of the one-kitchen house was Hull House in Chicago, opened in 1889 by Jane Addams (1860–1935) and Ellen Gates Starr (1859–1940), who co-founded the American settlement movement. Hull House was one of the first community practice facilities and was located in the middle of an immigrant neighborhood. From here, both direct help and cultural education were offered to the immigrants and refugees living in the neighborhood. At the same time, it was a research center for social issues, on the basis of which women in particular demanded socio-political reforms. In addition to social and community work, the house served as accommodation for both female workers and professional intellectuals, mostly immigrant women. With the aim of improving the living conditions of the women, a central kitchen was set up, from which the approximately 50 residents as well as people from the neighborhood were supplied. The women had the choice of ordering food to their homes or eating it in the communal dining room. This was both a meeting place and the starting point for a wide range of cultural and political activities.

== History of discourse – housing reform and women's work ==
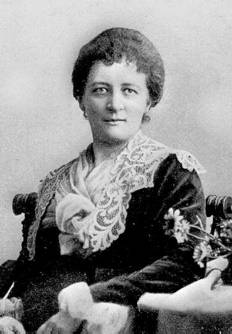
Lily Braun, 1902

Lily Braun (1865–1916), who was regarded as a mediator between the socialist and bourgeois women's movements, put forward her ideas on the centralization of domestic economy and cooperatively organized one-kitchen houses in papers and speeches from the end of the 19th century. She considered both the situation of proletarian women, who were forced into factory work outside the home as a result of industrialization, and that of bourgeois women who were striving to gain access to gainful employment. Economic cooperatives were one of the foundations for the liberation of women because, she wrote, quoting Kropotkin, "freeing them from the cooking stove and the washing barrel means making arrangements that allow them to bring up their children and take part in social life."

=== Lily Braun's model of the one-kitchen house ===
In 1901, Lily Braun published Women's Work and Domestic Economy, in which she outlined her model of the one-kitchen house. In her basic assumptions, she referred to August Bebel's comments on the industrialization of reproductive work, Kropotkin's criticism of the single household and the example of the Hull House in Chicago. Specifically, Lily Braun imagined a complex of houses in the middle of a garden with 50 to 60 apartments, each of which had only a small room with a dumbwaiter and a gas stove for emergencies instead of a kitchen:

The 50–60 kitchens, in which an equal number of women used to work, are replaced by a central kitchen on the ground floor, which is equipped with all modern labor-saving machines. There are already dishwashers that can clean and dry twenty dozen plates and bowls in three minutes!

— Lily Braun

The central kitchen would also include storage rooms and a laundry room with automatic washing machines. Depending on preference, meals would be eaten in one's own home or in a communal dining room, which could also serve as a meeting room and playroom for children. Housekeeping would be under the direction of a paid housekeeper, assisted by one or two kitchen maids.

The apartments are heated by central heating, so that here too 50 stoves are replaced by one. During the mothers' working hours, the children play in the hall or in the garden, where gymnastic apparatus and piles of sand provide activities for all ages, under the supervision of the caretaker. In the evening, when the mother has put them to bed and the parents want to chat with friends or read, they go down to the common rooms, where they don't have to buy entertainment by drinking alcohol if they don't feel the need for it.

— Lily Braun

The organization and financing was to be ensured via cooperatives and the workers' insurance fund. Braun calculated that the expense would also be within the realm of possibility for working-class families, as the savings from the elimination of individual kitchens, both in terms of rent and food, could be used to finance the central kitchen and common rooms.

Lily Braun saw the political and social impact of her concept as significant in several respects. It would solve the housing problems of the proletarians, the liberation of women from housework would promote the emancipation of women in general and, as a comprehensive family and life reform, collective economic management would enable family life to be freed from housework. In addition, this model would enable a nutrition reform, which would end the "harmful dilettantism in the kitchen" and ensure a balanced diet, and finally it would include an educational reform, and child education would be improved by trained personnel:

Not only would they be protected from the influence of the street and the sad precociousness of city children, they would also learn to develop the spirit of brotherhood at an early age.

— Lily Braun

However, the one-kitchen house model offered solutions not only for proletarian women, but also for middle-class families. For example, the professionalization of housework and homework could solve the housewife and servant question.

=== The criticism of social democracy ===
Lily Braun's essay provoked a great deal of opposition; her model of the one-kitchen house was described in the press as a "future rabbit stable, mass feeding in barracks and nationalized maternal joys". Within the Social Democrats, the proposal intervened in two controversial fundamental debates, one on housing reform and the other on labor protection, which was directly linked to the question of women's employment. In continuation of August Bebel's theories on emancipation of women, Clara Zetkin had formulated that disadvantage must be understood not only as a biological or legal problem, but above all as an economic one, with the consequence of demanding the right to work for women. This view was not shared unreservedly within the SPD; male comrades in particular feared competition from the expansion of the industrial reserve army and the associated wage suppression. Another counter-argument was the concern about the destructive consequences of women's work for the physical health of women and families. Like the housing issue, however, the solution to this contentious problem had been postponed to an unknown future that could only be found after the socialization of the means of production had been achieved. The SPD thus drew a clear line between itself and the "brainchildren" of the utopian socialists. Braun's model of the one-kitchen house, however, brought back the "overcome utopianism of the 19th century" in order to "spint out the recipes for the cookshop of the future".

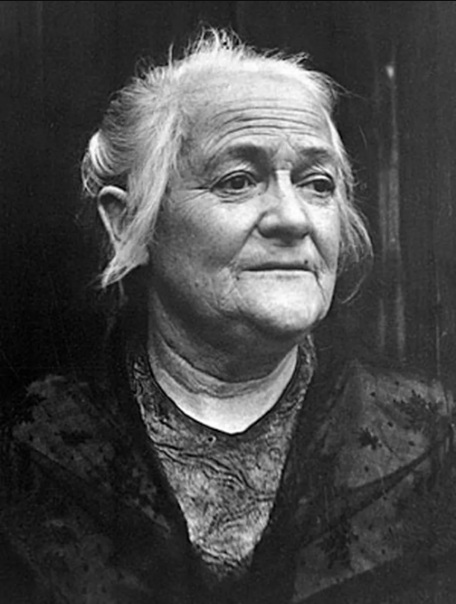
Clara Zetkin, 1920

The social democratic women's movement also rejected the idea. Clara Zetkin subjected the proposal to a comprehensive and scathing critique in several essays in the social democratic women's magazine Die Gleichheit: centralized housekeeping was not feasible for both mass workers and skilled workers, as their working conditions were subject to capitalist cyclical fluctuations and they could not commit themselves financially in the long term. If at all, then the model was only materially possible for the upper class of workers, but in these family circumstances women were not employed. Since the one-kitchen house is not affordable for the working women of poorer households, the model cancels itself out in its prerequisites. In addition, the central kitchen was exploiting the housekeepers and kitchen maids employed there, especially as the staffing requirements in the calculation were far too low. All of this makes it clear once again that a household cooperative can only be an achievement of realized socialism. Comrade Braun's proposal raised false hopes and would "paralyze the energy of the working class instead of strengthening it."

From 1905, a position formulated by Edmund Fischer prevailed within the Social Democrats, according to which the labor movement should also demand the "return of all women to the home". State kitchens and domestic cooperatives remained a utopian dream: "The so-called emancipation of women is contrary to female nature and human nature in general, is unnatural and therefore unfeasible." In retrospect, this "patriarchal solution" is often seen as a symptom of the decline of the offensive women's movement within the SPD. It was associated with the final rejection of cultural alternatives that would have freed women from housework.

=== The criticism of the women's movement ===
The associations of the women's movement, united from 1893 in the Bund Deutscher Frauenvereine (BDF) until the end of the 19th century, the associations of the women's movement were primarily concerned with questions of education and employment. At the beginning of the 20th century, however, the discussion took account of the changed social conditions; the dichotomy of employment and celibacy on the one hand, and life-long housewife-only existence and marriage on the other had given way to the growing problem of coordinating domestic and paid work. The position of women in the family became the central issue. In this discussion, Maria Lischnewska, who belonged to the radikalen Flügel, took up Lily Braun's idea of the one-kitchen house; she saw women's gainful employment outside the home as the basis of a marriage based on partnership, which was to be aspired to; only a woman freed from housework and economic dependence could be a wife and mother; private housework and ineffective private households were to be abolished.

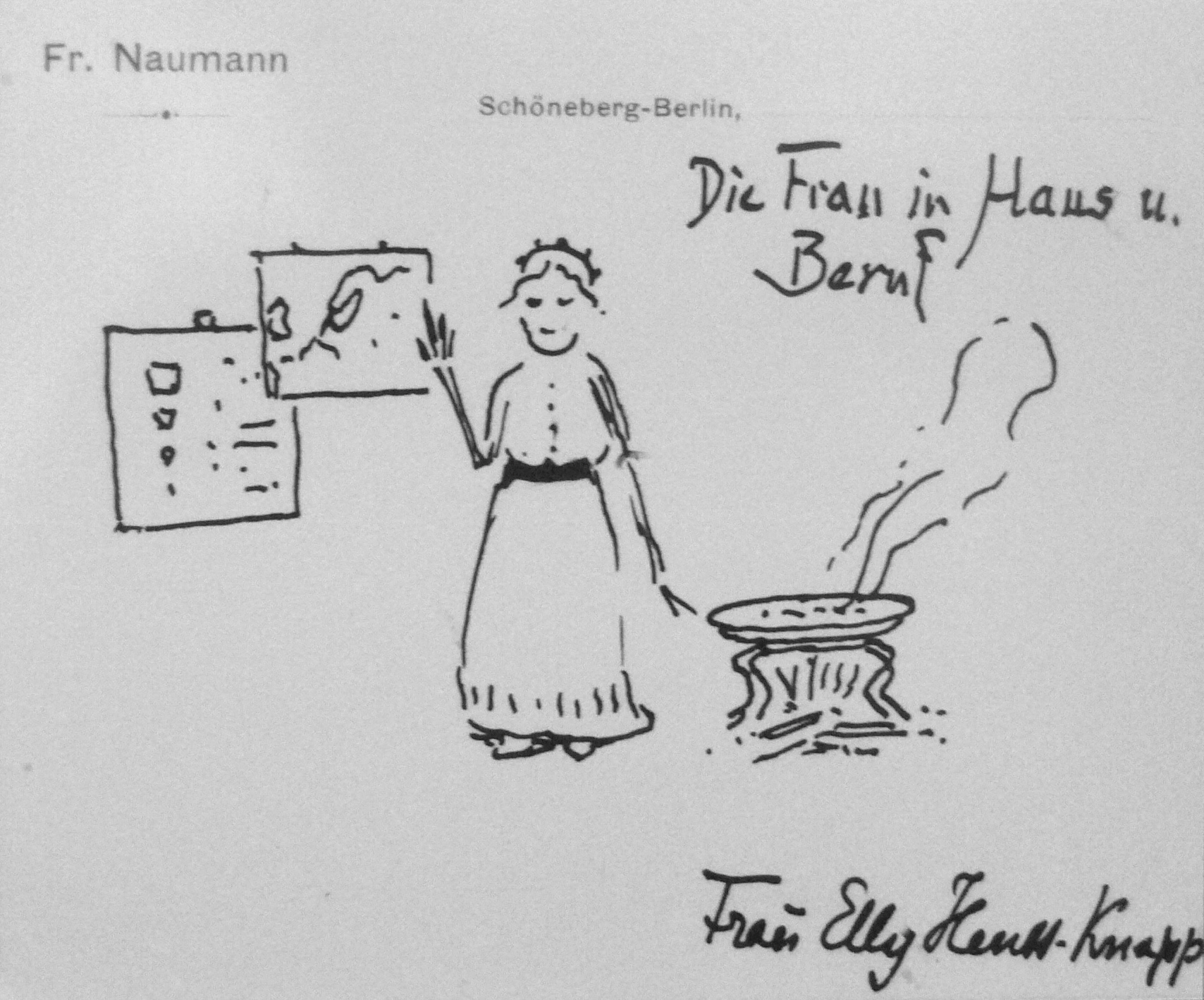
Elly Heuss-Knapp between home and work, caricature by Friedrich Naumann, early 20th century

Käthe Schirmacher took an opposing position to Lischnewska in that she saw housework as socially necessary, productive professional work and demanded its economic, legal and social recognition and remuneration. Elly Heuss-Knapp also rejected a "socialist solution" to the women's question and opposed the one-kitchen house solution, even though she welcomed technical progress and the improved infrastructure in the household. However, these would not be reflected in the reduction of housework, as the emotional and mental demands on the housewife would increase. However, such services could neither be provided by the market nor by cooperatives. In this sense, the majority of BDF women rejected the one-kitchen house. More promising in the debate about the double work of women was an orientation towards the systematization of work in the individual household and its rationalization through technical innovations. Part of the women's movement focused primarily on organizing and training housewives.

== First attempts at realization ==
Despite vehement criticism and rejection, Lily Braun founded a Haushaltungsgenossenschaft GmbH in 1903 in order to realize her one-kitchen house idea. The architect Kurt Berndt designed a corresponding house for Olivaer Platz in Berlin-Wilmersdorf, in which "bright, airy, simple apartments of any size with bathrooms, gas cooking facilities, central heating, gas and electric lighting as well as passenger elevators in the equally equipped front and garden house" were planned around a central kitchen. However, the project had to be abandoned as early as 1904 due to a lack of support and funding. At the time, none of the workers' organizations wanted to experiment with a public sector model and expose themselves to accusations of reformism. Subsequently, it was the private sector that took up the idea and realized the first one-kitchen houses in Europe.

=== Copenhagen 1903 ===
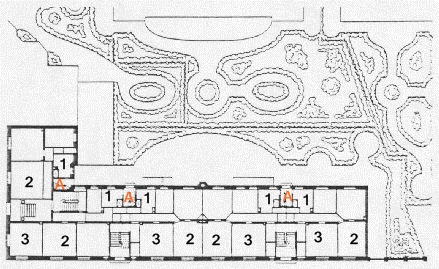
Floor plan of Centralbygningen:A – dumbwaiters, 1 – sideboard, 2 – dining room, 3 – living room

Centralbygningen in Frederiksberg is considered to be the first European one-kitchen house (a separate municipality forming an enclave in Copenhagen), which the former school principal Otto Fick had built in Forchhammersvej 4–8 in 1903. It was described as a "small-style social event", was explicitly set up for working, married women and was organized as a private enterprise in which both tenants and staff participated through contributions and, according to the annual balance sheet, in the profits. The five-storey apartment building with three- and four-room apartments, each without kitchens, had central heating, hot water pipes and a central vacuum cleaner. Electrically operated dumbwaiters led from the central kitchen in the basement to the preparation rooms in the apartments, where they were concealed behind wallpaper doors. The kitchen employed a kitchen manager, five assistants and a machinist and stoker.

The construction was received with interest by the German trade press. In 1907, the Zentralblatt der Bauverwaltung published a comprehensive description of the furnishings and functionality, stating emphatically: "The apartments are completely separated from each other, [...] so that the self-contained little world of family life remains untouched." The cultural magazine Die Umschau published an enthusiastic report in the same year:

What they have in common is that all work for the household is centralized, so that the individual is completely relieved of the care of cleaning, air, light, warmth and food with all the trimmings, from shopping, lighting the fire, cooking, serving, washing up, etc. [...] Centralized housekeeping is the realized table setting. [...] The central housekeeping is the little table laid for you. The happy residents get up: breakfast is ready.

— Rosika Schwimmer

The central kitchen facility in Copenhagen existed until 1942.

=== Stockholm 1906 ===
In 1906, architects Georg Hagström and Fritiof Ekman built the "Hemgården Centralkök" complex in Stockholm-Östermalm, modeled on the Copenhagen "Centralbygningen". It consisted of sixty two- to five-room apartments and a central kitchen and bakery on the first floor. Food was supplied via dumbwaiters and there was also a connection to the service facilities via a house telephone. The service included a laundry, an apartment cleaning service, a shoe shine and a central mail delivery service. Servants' rooms were set up for the employed staff. The house was considered a facility for well-off families who shared the servants ("collectivize the maid"). The one-kitchen house existed until 1918, after which modern kitchens were installed in the apartments and the communal rooms were converted into party and hobby rooms.

=== Berlin 1908 and 1909 ===
In 1907, the Zentralstelle für Einküchenhäuser G.m.b.H. was founded in Berlin, from which the Einküchenhaus-Gesellschaft der Berliner Vororte m.b.H. (EKBV) split off. Its program was designed to promote the establishment of domestic central economic systems. To this end, the society published a brochure in 1908 entitled Das Einküchenhaus und seine Verwirklichung als Weg zu einer neuen Heimkultur. In it, it explained that these types of buildings would enable tenants to live in a new way and resolve social conflicts. The previous debate surrounding Lily Braun's idea was explicitly taken up, but at the same time she distanced herself from attempts at a cooperative solution. The mechanization and centralization of economically backward households could only be achieved through a formally capitalist form of organization. The company presented calculations according to which living in a one-kitchen house was no more expensive than in a normal rented house, "not counting the great ideal values that are gained." The target group was "mainly members of the so-called liberal professions, who yearned to get out of the housing culture, out of the servant calamity, or where the woman wants to be free for her own professional activity, mostly in the intellectual or artistic field." The company's expansion plans included an extension to include working-class communities. In addition, the centralized economic system was to have its own food and agricultural goods production, which was to be connected to the trust-like kitchen houses.

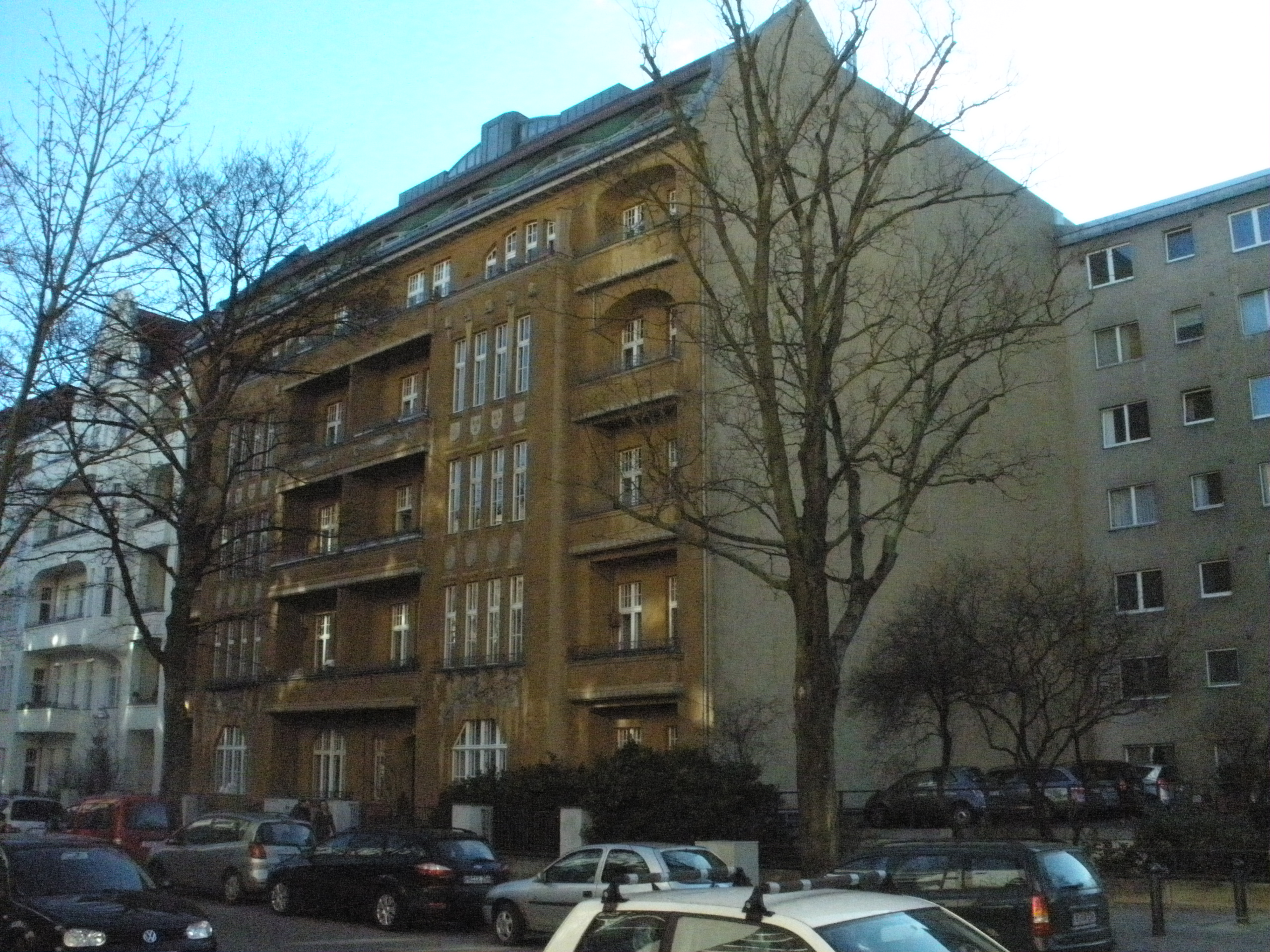
Kuno-Fischer-Straße 13

On October 1, 1908, the first Berlin Einküchenhaus am Lietzensee in Charlottenburg, built by the architect Curt Jähler, was ready for occupancy at Kuno-Fischer-Straße 13. It was a five-storey residential building with a front building and small front garden, two side wings and a transverse building. It was equipped with central heating and hot water supply, the two- to five-room apartments had bathrooms, dressing rooms with dumbwaiters and in-house telephones. The central kitchen was located in the basement and existed until 1913. It was reported that living in this house was 15 percent more expensive for an average family than in a conventional household, but the circles that could afford these costs would not do without a maid for reasons of prestige alone.

On April 1, 1909, the Einküchenhäuser Lichterfelde-West were completed and the architect Hermann Muthesius was hired to build them. These were two detached three-storey apartment buildings, a corner house at Potsdamer Straße 59 (today Unter den Eichen and Reichensteiner Weg) with an L-shaped floor plan, in which only three-room apartments were laid out, and a rectangular house across Ziethenstraße (today Reichensteiner Weg) with two- to four-room apartments. The concept was modified compared to the house on Lietzensee with a "richer cultural program". Both houses each had a central kitchen in the basement, from which dumbwaiters transported the meals to the apartments. There was no common dining room. Instead, roof terraces were used communally and a kindergarten was attached. The apartments had emergency kitchens, equipped with gas stoves, hot water pipes and house telephones. The entire complex was surrounded by spacious grounds and front gardens. The central kitchen had to be abandoned in 1915, the southern of the two houses was demolished in 1969/1970 in the course of widening the street Unter den Eichen, while the northern one has been preserved in a modified form.

The Einküchenhäuser Friedenau at Wilhelmshöher Straße 17–20 were also ready for occupancy on April 1, 1909. It is a building complex by architect Albert Gessner consisting of three houses, two built symmetrically around a street courtyard with a roofed garden hall, the third adjoining the street. They are plaster buildings with hipped roofs, arcades, loggias and balconies, which are reminiscent of the country house style. The houses were equipped with partly open, partly covered roof terraces and adjoining shower rooms, a gym with equipment, a storage room for furniture, moth rooms, bicycle rooms, dark rooms for photographic work, laundry rooms, drying rooms, ironing rooms and a central vacuum cleaner system. The central kitchen was located in the basement of house no. 18/19, and the food supply was provided via a total of nine dumbwaiters, which in turn were connected to a track system in the basement rooms. A kindergarten was also set up, which was run by a Reformpädagogin. The central kitchen had to be abandoned in 1917/1918.

Although the one-kitchen houses were very popular and the apartments were already rented out before completion, the company failed. The Einküchenhaus-Gesellschaft filed for bankruptcy as early as May 1909. The reasons given were organizational resistance and a lack of capital. The central kitchens were maintained by the residents during a transitional period in cooperative self-help. The houses were positively received by the architect Stefan Doernberg, who published an essay on the one-kitchen house problem in 1911. He noted that the operation was profitable and that the experiment with "child-poor, highly educated tenants under expert, interested management" had succeeded on a capitalist basis. He concluded by calling on his fellow architects to recognize the social and economic importance of their profession and to take similar action.

== History of discourse – Public housing ==
The thrones may have been overturned, but the old spirit is tenaciously rooted throughout the land

— Walter Gropius,

After the First World War, building policy was also determined by scarcity and shortages, and the elimination of the mass housing shortage was seen as an urgent task. Efforts to socialize or reduce land prices, to transfer the housing stock to municipal or cooperative administrations failed due to the fragile political conditions of the young Weimar Republic. Strategies for solving the housing shortage were primarily seen in the rationalization of housing construction. The avant-garde architects opposed the reformist programs and strove for a new people's housing. However, this remained stuck in theory and in numerous brochures, guidelines and statements until around 1924, while the old institutions of housing construction were already defining the future policy of construction in the schemes small house and apartment in the countryside. Nevertheless, the one-kitchen house model found its way into the contributions of social scientists and architects, especially from the pointed point of view of economy.

=== Economiat as an economic model ===
In 1919, the doctor of Volkswirtin Claire Richter published a historically elaborated study under the title Das Ökonomiat. Domestic economy as an end in itself. She used the term economiat to describe the model of the one-kitchen house to emphasize its importance as an economic form. After a comprehensive presentation of the history of the central household economy, from Fourier to the present day, she dealt with the economic benefits of female labor. She documented the enormous waste caused by private households of all social classes, which had to be stopped in the face of economic crises. She saw the centralization of the domestic economy as a viable way to save means and resources, as it differed from all "large households with an institutional character such as educational and hospital institutions, old people's homes and poorhouses" due to its self-purpose. With her writing, she addressed the institutions of housing reform in particular, to create a "subjective insight among the objectively affected reformers and entrepreneurs".

In 1921, Claire Richter, together with the social democratic women's rights activist Wally Zepler and the architect Robert Adolph, founded the Lankwitz Association for a Charitable Kitchen Economy, which campaigned for the establishment of kitchen houses on both a political and practical level. The cause was supported by the Social Democratic member of the Reichstag Marie Juchacz, among others. In October 1921, the association organized a rally in Berlin under the motto Social kitchen economy – a challenge of the times and passed a resolution calling for the construction of more charitable single-kitchen houses within the framework of state housing construction. It stated,

[...] dhe rational management of the household within the framework of a communal one-kitchen economy is capable of significantly easing the situation of women. [...] Through the economic organization of domestic consumption on the one hand and the incomparably higher use of building facilities for residential purposes on the other, it is able to make the current restrictions in the national and private economy bearable.

— Resolution des Lankwitzer Vereins, Oktober 1921

The association also drew up a project for a site at Lankwitzer Stadtpark, in which the individual kitchens for 42 single-family homes were to be replaced by a central kitchen and a horizontal overhead conveyor system was to provide the connections. The organization of both the administration and the management of the kitchen was intended as a cooperative. This was the first one-kitchen house model in single-family construction. It was not realized, the reasons for this are not documented.

=== Reform concepts of architecture ===
The one-kitchen house model only found its way into the urban planning strategies of the 1920s in isolated cases, while the establishment of extensive infrastructure such as wash houses and stores progressed in housing development. The architects Peter Behrens and Heinrich de Fries stated that, in addition to the rationality of construction, the "rationality of the organization of communal life" could best be realized in the system of single-kitchen houses, but this idea was not implemented by them. Hermann Muthesius, who had erected the corresponding building in Berlin-Lichterfelde for the Einküchenhaus-Gesellschaft der Berliner Vororte in 1908, now rejected the idea as a makeshift solution. The Austrian architect Oskar Wlach advocated the realization of one-kitchen houses. He saw this as the development of a new form of housing that lay between the individual economy of a tenement and communal care in residential homes: "This middle type has to combine individualization in one's own home with the economy of a uPnified economy and the acceptability of shared daydreams." Henry van de Velde was also a proponent of the central kitchen, saying that architecturally, it was in the typological context of the urban apartment building anyway, as its appearance was not influenced by the kitchen. However, the one-kitchen house carried the seeds of a more complete community, "because we will not be satisfied for long with the house in which only the kitchen is communal".

The architect and urban planner Fritz Schumacher, building director from 1908 and chief building director in Hamburg from 1923 to 1933, had already dealt intensively with the pros and cons of the one-kitchen house in 1909. He saw it as an opportunity for progress in metropolitan culture and in particular for women's emancipation efforts. His arguments in favor were the potential for savings in interior design, the promotion of the intellectual interests of women relieved of small-scale work, the liberation of the cooking profession from its servant character and the improvement of food culture by skilled workers. As counter-arguments, he cited the loss of individuality, the loss of material and idealistic support in the household, especially if the woman was not working, and the increasing devaluation of the home. Schumacher's somewhat anecdotal remark that "the loss of the privilege of some householders to have a special cooking talent in the house in the form of their wife is to be regretted" has also been passed down. In 1921, Schumacher tried to implement his ideas of single-kitchen houses in the construction of the Dulsberg-Siedlung in Hamburg, but failed due to the resistance of the Senate.

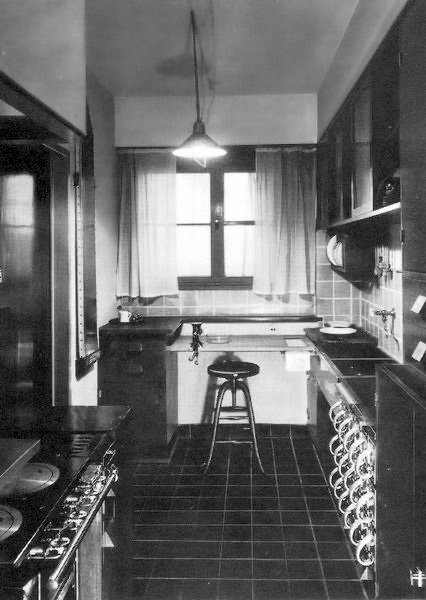
Reform model Frankfurt kitchen, 1926

=== The rationalization of housekeeping ===
From the mid-1920s, the discussion about the one-kitchen house was overtaken by the rationalization of individual households and in particular the standardization of kitchens. A great success of the women's movement was the direct involvement of women's organizations in housing construction institutions. One of the most effective projects of the time was the Reichsforschungsgesellschaft für Wirtschaftlichkeit im Bau- und Wohnungswesen, initiated by Marie-Elisabeth Lüders, a member of the Reichstag. Funding was provided for Classical Modernist experimental housing estates such as Stuttgart-Weißenhof, Dessau-Törten and Frankfurt-Praunheim, which were examined by architects, engineers and representatives of housewives' associations in terms of their suitability for domestic and family use. The "liberation of women from the kitchen stink" shifted to the design of modern kitchens according to the principles of rational housekeeping. The floor plan and furnishings were selected with smooth work processes in mind, with the Frankfurt Kitchen developed in 1926 by the Viennese architect Margarete Schütte-Lihotzky considered the prototype.

Schütte-Lihotzky explained the strengths of the rationalization of individual households as opposed to the centralization of housekeeping in an essay from 1927: The one-kitchen house concept suffers from the fact that a stable standard of living for the residents is a prerequisite, as the financing shares for the central kitchen, central heating and other communal facilities must be raised under all circumstances, but cannot be guaranteed by those who may become unemployed within a short period of time.

After we realize that the one-kitchen house is out of the question for a very large part of the population, we must do everything we can to reform the individual household and relieve women of all unnecessary work.

— Margarete Schütte-Lihotzky

The reorientation towards the rationalization concept happened comprehensively and quickly, the standardized kitchen not only had the advantage of optimized work processes, which enabled household management according to economic principles, but could also be implemented cost-effectively in mass construction. The model of the one-kitchen house was inferior to this concept and was considered a failure in both cooperative and mass housing construction. "In the assembly chains of row construction and in the claim of (superior) functionality of the form of the standard apartment, what we have come to know as social life and social space in the courtyards, galleries, residents' meetings, dining and reading rooms of the single-kitchen houses has disappeared. This social life now falls under waste."

== Cooperative one-kitchen houses ==
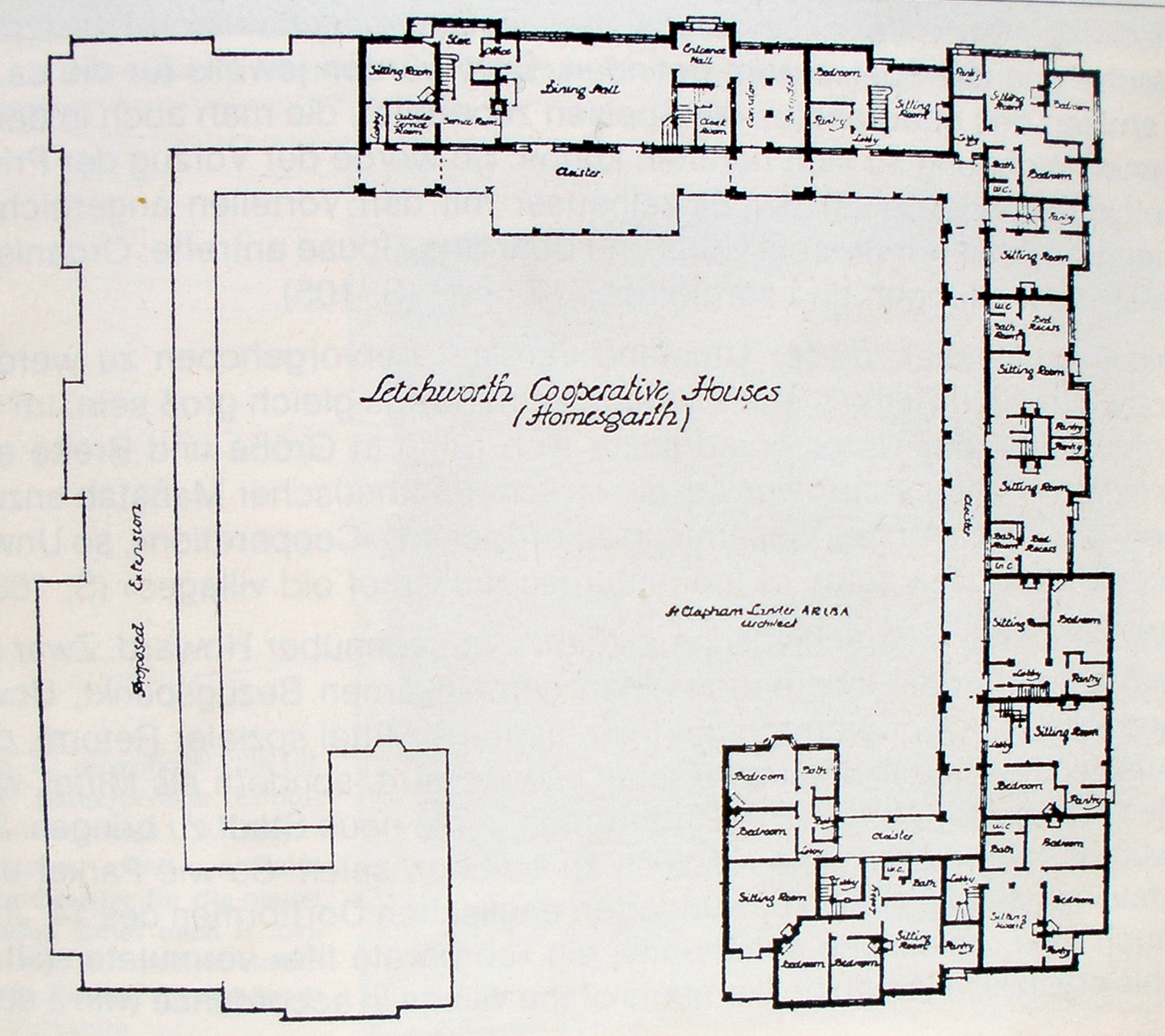
Sketch of the floor plan of Homesgarth, Letchworth

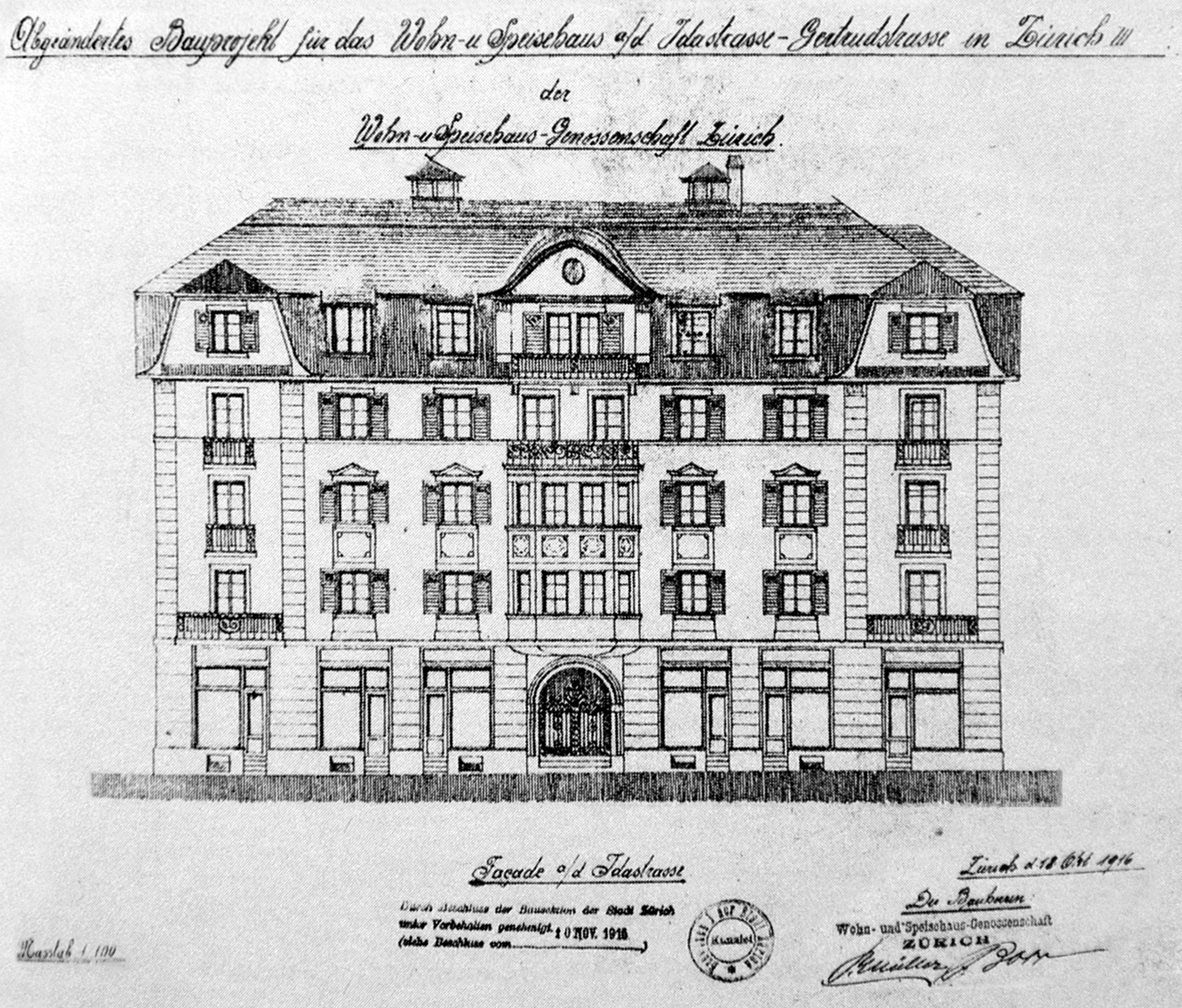
Bauzeichnung des Amerikanerhaus, Zürich 1916

=== Letchworth 1909 ===
The garden city movement was both a parallel and a counter-concept to the urban one-kitchen house, in which it strived for the "ideal community" outside the cities. What both reform concepts have in common is their view of architecture: a differently built environment would shape different social behavior. However, in contrast to the goal of creating a home of one's own within the garden city, the one-kitchen model stood in the way of the formation of individual ownership of the small house. Nevertheless, Ebenezer Howard planned the construction of a one-kitchen house complex within Letchworth Garden City, the first realized garden city in Europe. Under the direction of the architect Clapham Lander, the cooperative Homesgarth (today Solershot House) was built in 1909/1910, a complex of two to three-storey houses with 24 apartments without individual kitchens, in the middle of which a communal area with a central kitchen, dining room and lounges was laid out. It was to be a closed block around a courtyard, but the project was only half realized.

The apartments only have facilities for preparing very small meals and cleaning small dishes; the large dishes are washed again in the main kitchen, which is well equipped with labour-saving appliances. A crèche is attached to the side of the house wings in a large, sunny room. There is a motherly caregiver and access to a conveniently located outdoor playground. There is also a wash house, also conveniently located, with all necessary facilities.

The house was organized on a cooperative basis. Food and fuel were purchased collectively and the costs for the central facilities as well as for the kitchen and service staff were passed on to the residents. Although the aim was to distance themselves from the early socialists and seek a balance between collective and family concerns, Homesgarth was often compared to Fourier's communitarian experiments.

=== Zurich 1916 ===
The so-called American House on Idastrasse in Zurich is a project that was planned as a one-kitchen house but was ultimately not realized. The social reformer Oskar Schwank founded the Wohn- und Speisehausgenossenschaft in 1915 and had the community house built in 1916 in the style of Godin's Familistère in Guise. In addition to the central kitchen and the dining room on the first floor, the interior was laid out around a courtyard with arcades across the floors. In the course of the planning permission process, however, Schwank had to change the plans, have individual kitchens installed in the apartments and convert the central kitchen into a restaurant. Nevertheless, due to its design, it was considered a collective model until the 1940s, as the wide arcades, the courtyard and the restaurant, known as the Ämtlerhalle, were used for the residents' communal activities. Community life in this house was investigated and published in 1976 by the social scientist Peter Trösch through resident surveys. This is considered noteworthy as it is one of the few testimonies to everyday life in collective institutions in the 1920s. The aspect of the effect of the architecture is only touched on as a topic: "If the house gave rise to a sense of community and productive communication among the residents [...] this was certainly due to the design, which, unlike the Copenhagen house, followed the type of the arcade courtyard house." After its completion, the building itself remained in the cooperative ownership of the craftsmen involved in its construction. In 1946, it became the property of Zürcher Löwenbräu as Ämtlerhalle AG and has been a listed building since 1992.

=== Berlin 1921 ===
After the First World War, the Free Religious Community Berlin built a one-kitchen house at Pappelallee 15 in the Prenzlauer Berg district of Berlin. It served as a home for war-disabled people who could not provide for themselves. The social building was not recognizable as a dormitory from the street front. The kitchen was built as a canteen kitchen; there was a food elevator in the dormitory to distribute the food to the floors. Later, the residential units developed into normal apartments.

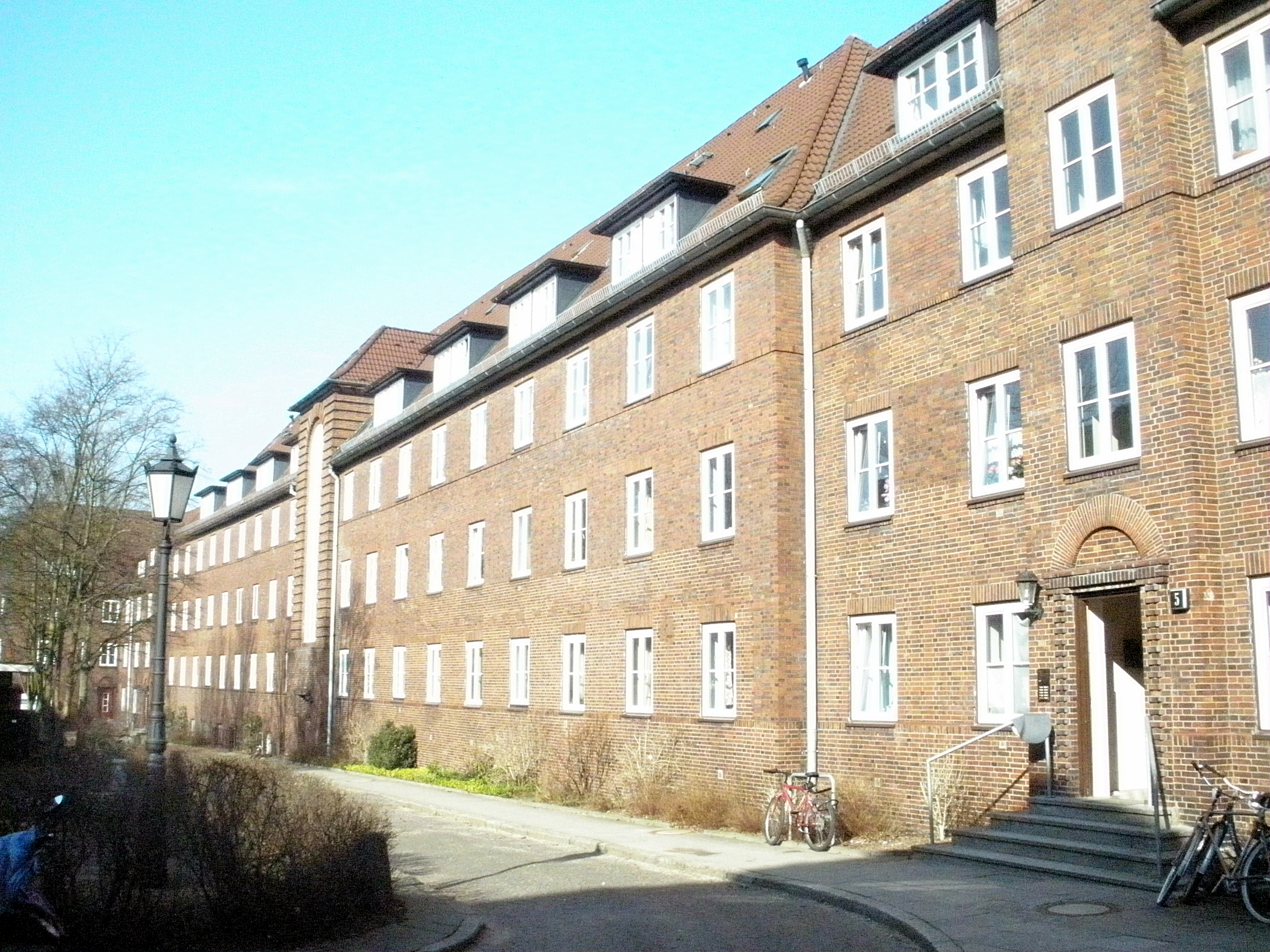
Former single people's home in the Dulsberg housing estate

=== Hamburg 1921 ===
Dulsberg was former farmland in the north-east of Hamburg that was earmarked for urban expansion from around 1910. From 1919, this was implemented with a reformed development plan under the direction of city planning director Fritz Schumacher. The first realized block of flats comprised the so-called Dulsberg-Siedlung, the client was the city, represented by the Baudeputation. Schumacher initially designed these ten blocks of flats as single-kitchen houses; each block was to have "a small economy" for communal catering. This was to be run either as a cooperative or as an independent enterprise. However, the Senate and Bürgerschaftskommission for housing issues rejected the proposal:

Bedenken wurden […] von fast allen Seiten gegen die Einführung des Einküchenhauses geäußert. Diese Neuerung sei nur geeignet, den häuslichen Herd zu zerstören und damit den Familiensinn zu untergraben, sie werden ohne Zweifel an dem Widerstand der hamburgischen Hausfrauen scheitern, die es vorziehen würden, selbständig zu wirtschaften.
Concerns were raised [...] by almost all sides against the introduction of the single-kitchen house. They claim this innovation would only be to suit the destruction of the household stove and with it would undermine the sense of familial unity, and they will without a doubt fail from the resistance of Hamburg's housewives, who would prefer to run their households by themselves.

=== Wien 1923 ===
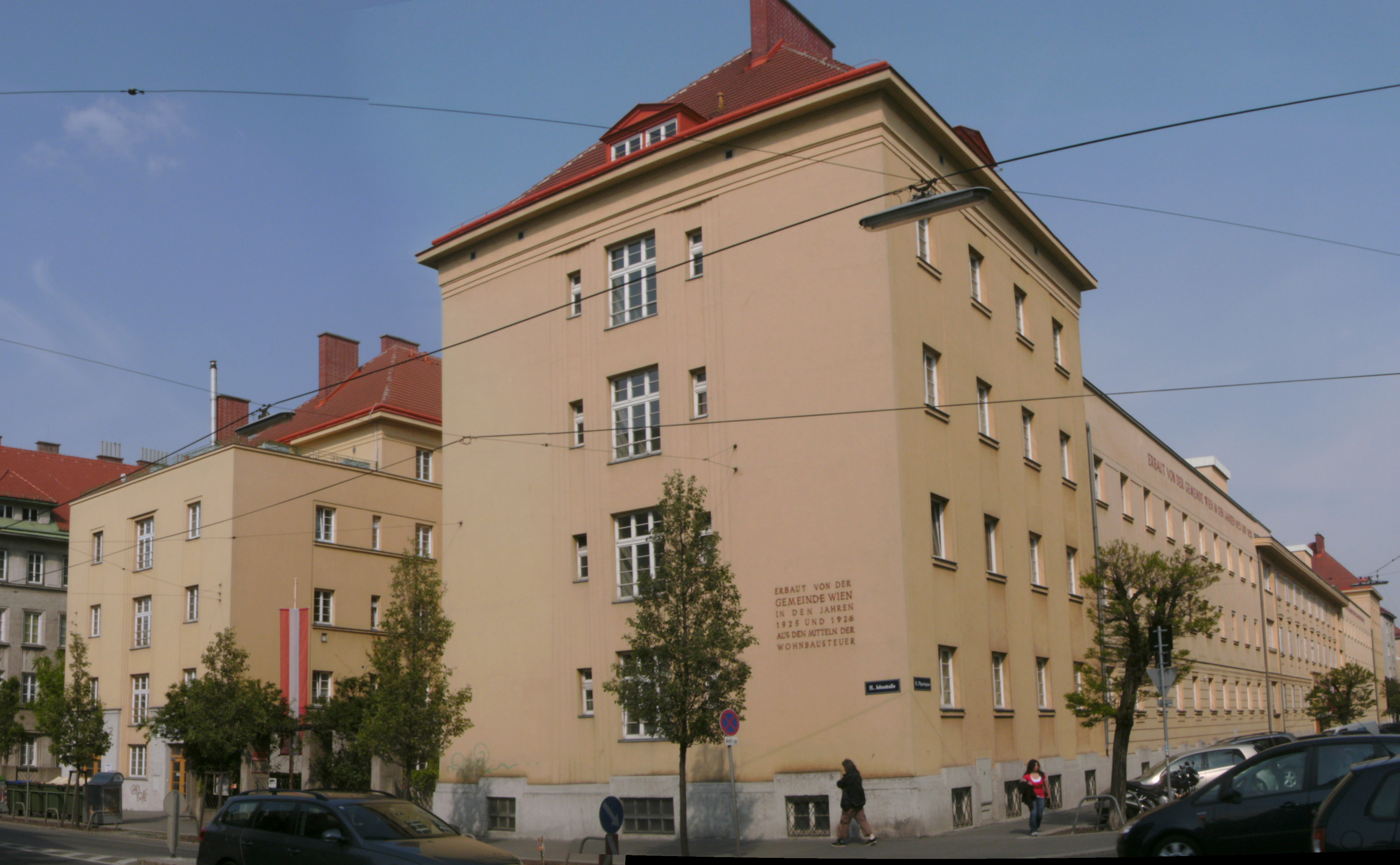
Heimhof, Ecke Johnstraße / Pilgerimgasse, Wien 15.

The Heimhof on Pilgerimgasse in Vienna is considered one of the best-known single-kitchen houses. It was built between 1921 and 1923 as a municipal housing project of Red Vienna according to plans by the architect Otto Polak-Hellwig. The developer was the Gemeinnützige Bau- und Wohnungsgenossenschaft Heimhof, which was based on an initiative by the social reformer Auguste Fickert and had been running a house for single, working women since 1911. The core of the complex was a three-storey wing in Pilgerimgasse, with 24 small apartments for married couples and families in which both partners had a job. The central kitchen and a communal dining room formed the heart of the complex. From here, dumbwaiters led to the apartments, which were equipped with so-called utility niches instead of individual kitchens, in which smaller meals could be prepared. The central housekeeping staff were municipal employees who were also responsible for cleaning the apartments and doing the laundry. A laundry was set up in the basement for this purpose. Other collective facilities included reading rooms, hot water baths, roof gardens and sun terraces. The care and supervision of the children during the parents' working hours was described as "excellent". In 1924, the cooperative ran into financial difficulties, the municipality of Vienna took over ownership of the house and the cooperative remained in charge of its management. According to plans by architect Carl Witzmann, the Heimhof was extended in 1925 from a detached building to a closed block with a total of 352 apartments. The kindergarten was integrated inside the block. During its existence, the Heimhof was criticized in very different ways. In 1923, for example, the following statement was made at a Vienna municipal council meeting:

It is nonsense for a family to live in such a one-kitchen house. For moral reasons, it is also not advisable to relieve the housewife of all household chores. The young housewife should only worry, she should learn to manage and save, that will only be of use to her in the future.

On the other hand, an architectural journal from 1924, after a very detailed positive description, welcomed the project as forward-looking:

Certainly, the one-kitchen house does not mean the highest domestic bliss. But it is certainly a promising station on the way to freeing mankind, working with head and hand, from the superfluous ballast of domestic activity.

But even in Vienna, the one-kitchen house remained an isolated experiment. As early as 1934, at the beginning of Austrofascism, centralized kitchen management was abolished. After the National Socialists came to power in 1938, the cooperative and its communal facilities were finally dissolved. The apartments were now equipped with small kitchens and bathrooms; without the infrastructure, they lost their attractiveness, were used as emergency accommodation and fell into disrepair. In the 1990s, the Heimhof underwent extensive renovation. What remains of the house is a silent film by Austrian director Leopold Niernberger from 1922 entitled Das Einküchenhaus. It tells the story of a working mother who comes to know and appreciate the advantages of the home. has been researching the potentials and limits of (international) historical, collective housing concepts based on the two Viennese one-kitchen houses and establishing links to the current housing discourse.

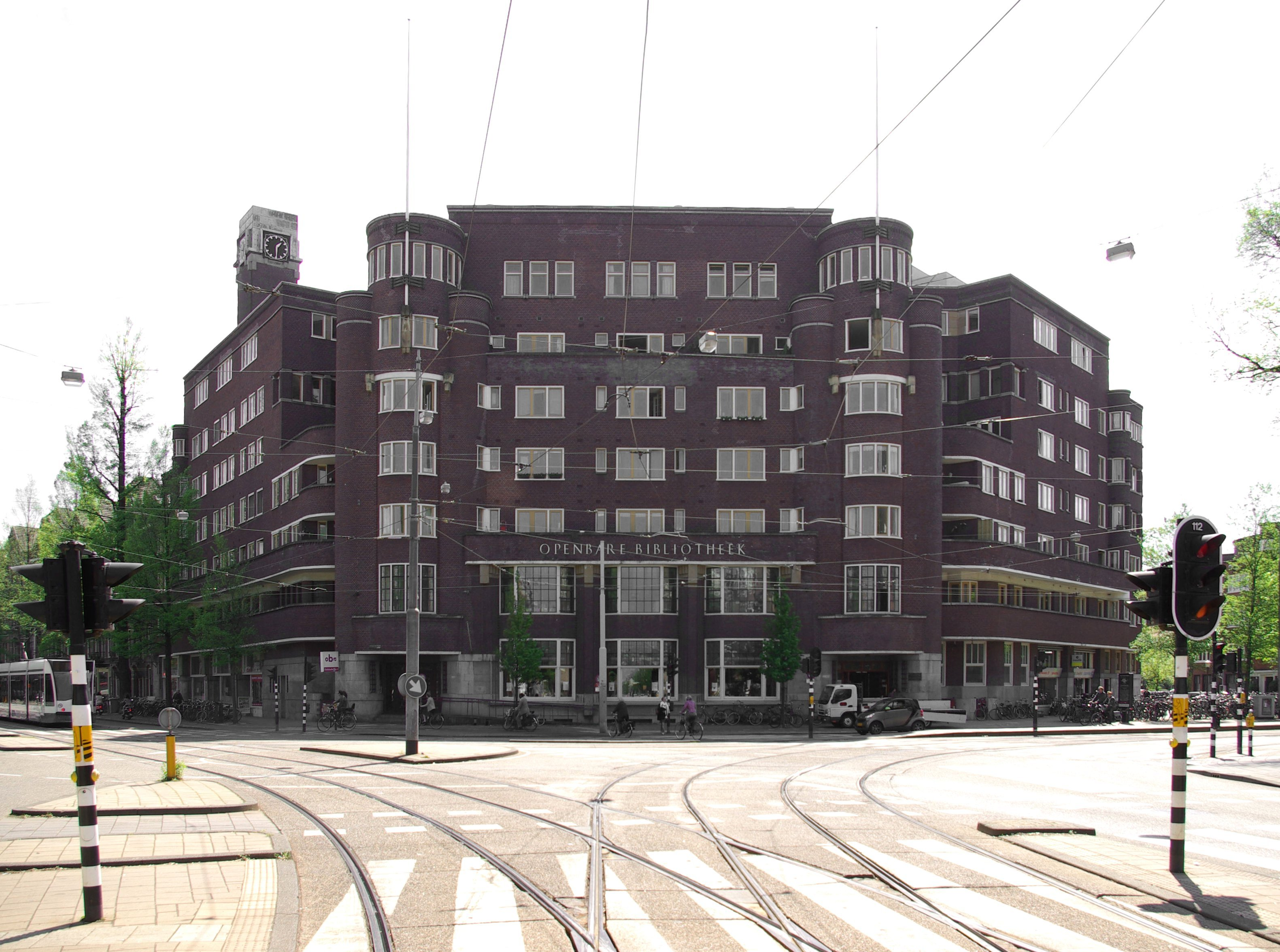
Het Nieuwe Huis in Amsterdam, 2011

=== Amsterdam 1928 ===
Het Nieuwe Huis in Amsterdam, which was built in 1927/28 according to a design by the architect Barend van den Nieuwen Amstel (1883–1957) in the Expressionist style, received little attention in the German-speaking discourse on public housing or modern architecture. Amsterdam School. Its origins go back to the organization Amsterdamsche Coöperatieve Keuken (ACK), which had been encouraging the construction of a one-kitchen house for single people and small families at the housing cooperative Samenleving since 1912. In the course of an urban expansion implemented from 1917, the Samenleving cooperative, founded by municipal and state officials, took over the development of seven blocks of houses on Roelof Hartplein, where Het Nieuwe Huis, designed in collaboration with the ACK, was finally built. While the rental remained in the hands of Samenleving, the Coöperatieve Woonvereniging Het Nieuwe Huis, which still exists today, was founded to run the building.

In addition to the original 169 apartments and the restaurant, the building had a library with a reading room, a post office, four stores on the first floor, roof terraces, an in-house telephone system, dumbwaiters and a bicycle station in the basement. The residents had access to services, including housework and family chores and shopping. In the early years, 35 employees with their own management were employed at the home. In contrast to the previously existing, gender-segregated workers' or women's homes (Dutch tehuizen), Het Nieuwe Huis was a novelty in Amsterdam due to its mixed character, which also earned the home the derisive name De Laatste Kans (German The Last Chance).

== History of Discourse – New Building and Functionalism ==
The ideological background differed widely, both from its predecessors and from each other. The Narkomfin in Moscow, for example, was designed as a commune house for a socialist way of life, while the Ledigenheim of the Werkbund Estate Breslau was an architectural exhibit, the Boardinghouse des Westens in Hamburg a profit-oriented apartment building, the Kollektivhuset in Stockholm a sociological project and the London Isokon Building an experiment in collective living.

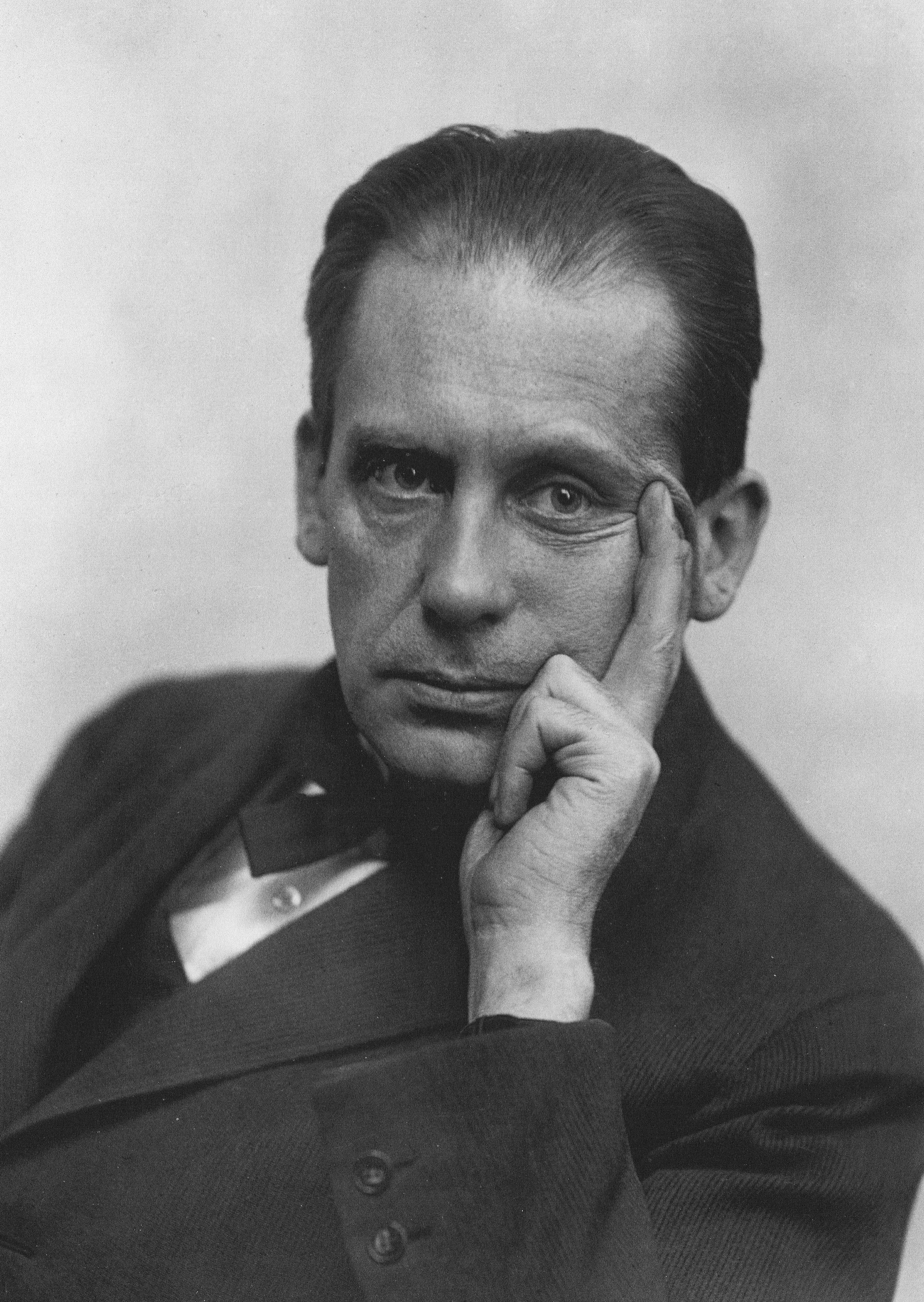
Walter Gropius

The conceptual debate in the succession around central kitchens and communal facilities was taken up by Walter Gropius during the Congrès International d'Architecture Moderne (CIAM) in Frankfurt in 1929 and subsequently in Brussels in 1930. At both congresses, he presented his concept of the residential tower in opposition to housing estates and small houses, arguing that sensible urban development was inconceivable if all residents lived in their own homes with gardens:

the metropolis must become more positive, it needs the incentive of the self-developed, special form of housing that corresponds to its life organism, which combines a relative maximum of air, sun and plant growth with a minimum of traffic routes and management effort.

In addition to the urban planning and architectural elaborations, Gropius also presented basic socio-political assumptions. Relief from housework was the prerequisite for personal independence; accordingly, the large household was a desirable goal, especially for women after the dissolution of the extended family. The state takes over the former family functions by centrally organizing children's homes, schools, retirement homes and hospitals. The remaining small family functions could be accommodated in the high-rise residential building, with the help of extensive mechanization of housing management and centralization into a large household.

In 1931, Walter Gropius presented his design for the Wohnhochhäuser am Wannsee, a plan for fifteen eleven-storey buildings in steel skeleton construction with a total of 660 apartments, which were to offer a large number of families an "apartment in the countryside" on a relatively small strip of land with a view over the Havel and Wannsee. The apartments themselves would be equipped with small functional kitchens, and Gropius described the communal facilities as a café and social room with a roof terrace, library and reading room, sports and bathing room. The realization of the project failed due to both the world economic crisis and the German building laws of the time. The high-rise residential buildings built in Germany in the 1960s, on the other hand, are described as empty shells of the Gropius concept.

== Realization through new building ==
=== Moscow 1928 ===
The Narkomfin (Russian: Дом Наркомфина, romanized: Dom Narkomfina) is a six-storey apartment block in Moscow, built between 1928 and 1932 as a communal house for officials of the People's Commissariat of Finance (Narkomfin, Russian: Наркомфин). The architects Moissei Ginsburg and Ignatij Milinis designed the building as part of the state-sponsored Experimental Building Program. Their project was supported by the color-design of the German Bauhaus avangardist Hinnerk Scheper. The structure envisaged a new way of living for Soviet citizens, which was intended to promote equality and collectivity and provided only small retreat spaces for personal needs. Accordingly, the building featured apartment types with "minimal individual and maximum communal space", with apartments of up to 100 m² on one level and 37 m² split-level units on two floors. Instead of separate kitchens, there were kitchens on each floor and a central kitchen. This was located alongside other communal facilities such as a sports hall, wash-house and library in an additional block, accessed via an internal "glass street". The roof of the complex featured a garden and sun terraces, as well as a penthouse, which was occupied by the then Soviet Finance Minister Nikolai Milyutin (in office: 1924-1929).

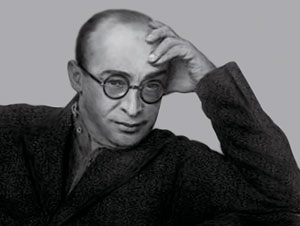
Moissei Ginsburg, Architekt

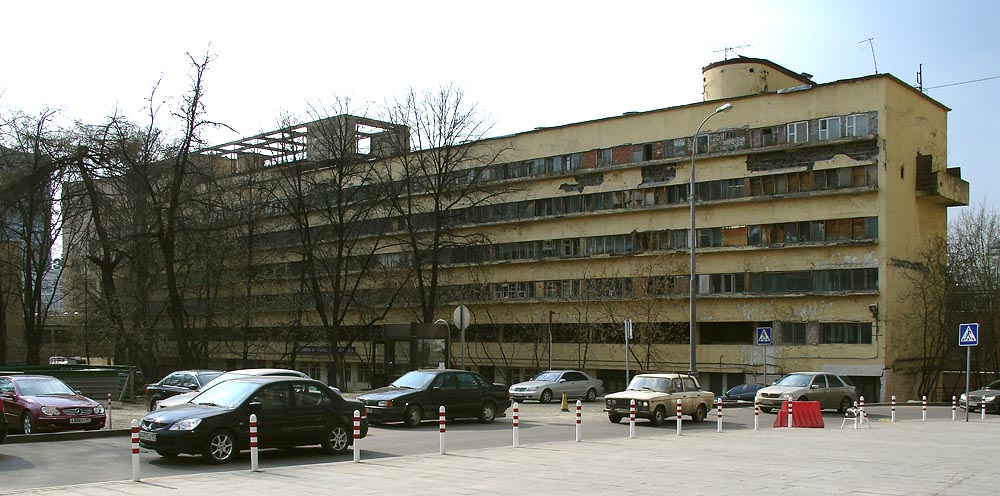
Narkomfin, 2007

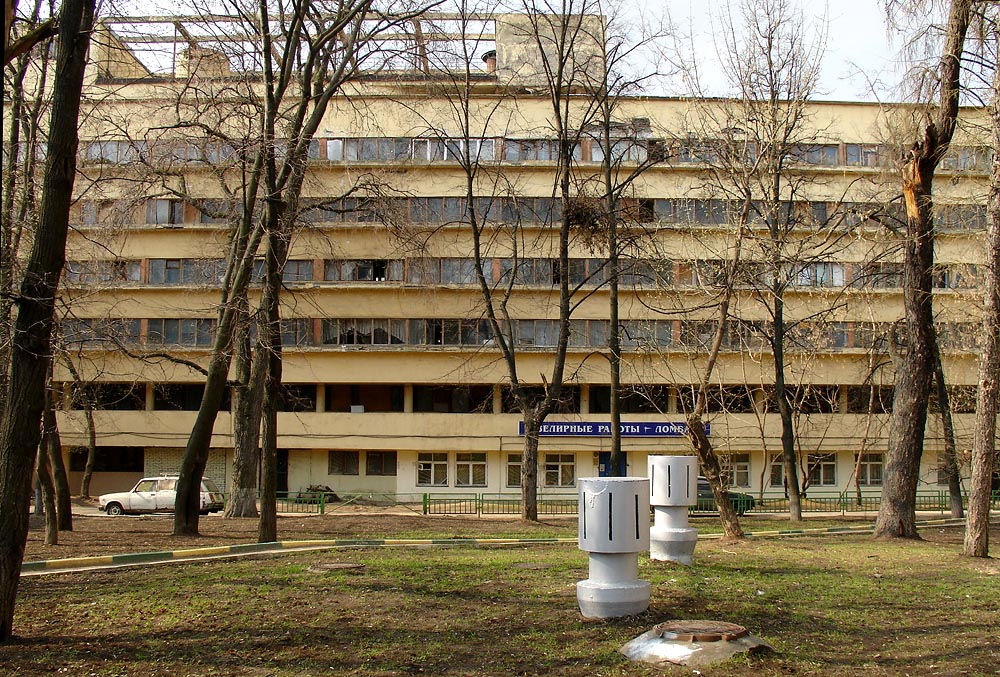
Ostseite

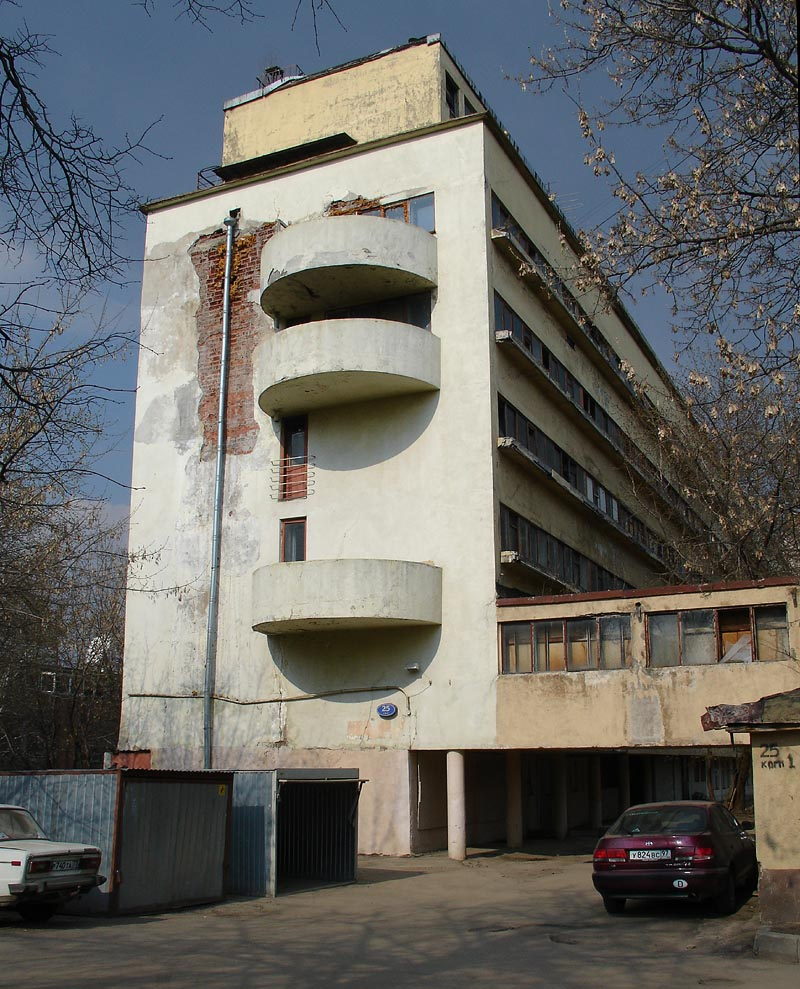
Südseite

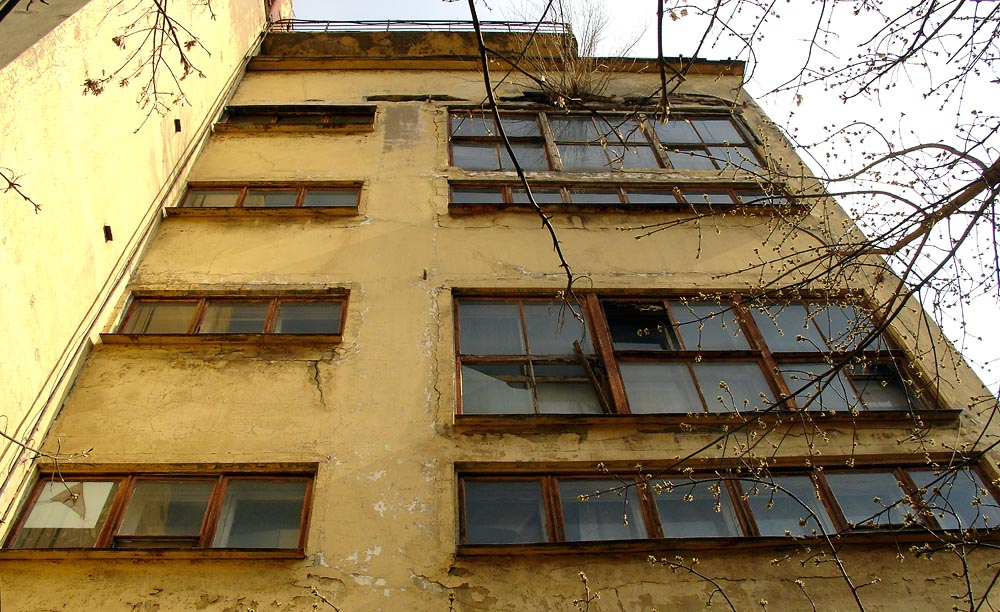
Westseite

The building is considered a pioneering example of Soviet Constructivism. However, a planned second residential block and a kindergarten were never built. In 1932, the Stalin-regime grouped architects into an umbrella organization.

The Russian avant-garde, which until then had been regarded as the artistic expression of the Revolution, was not permitted and was banned from building: visionary building experiments were seen as wasteful and would not bring any profit for the Kommunalka. The communal facilities of the Narkomfin were subject to conversion, and the building subsequently fell into disrepair. In 2006, the World Monuments Fund added it to its list of endangered buildings, and international conservationists are campaigning for its preservation.

=== Wrocław 1929 ===
The Ledigenheim, House 31 of the Werkbund Estate Breslau (then Breslau in Germany, present-day Wrocław in Poland), was one of 37 project houses built in 1929 as part of the Werkbundausstellung Wohnung und Werkraum. Designed by the architect Hans Scharoun, it comprised 66 split-level apartments equipped with minimal kitchens, communal areas and a central restaurant. It was geared towards the "nomadic city dweller", single people or couples without children, and offered hotel-like service for the temporary residence of the "cosmopolitan". The Panzerkreuzer Scharoun (armoured cruiser Scharoun), as the house was also mockingly called, was considered the first building with apartments on two levels, which also influenced Moisei Ginzburg's designs at the Narkomfin in Moscow. The house was later converted into the Park Hotel Scharoun

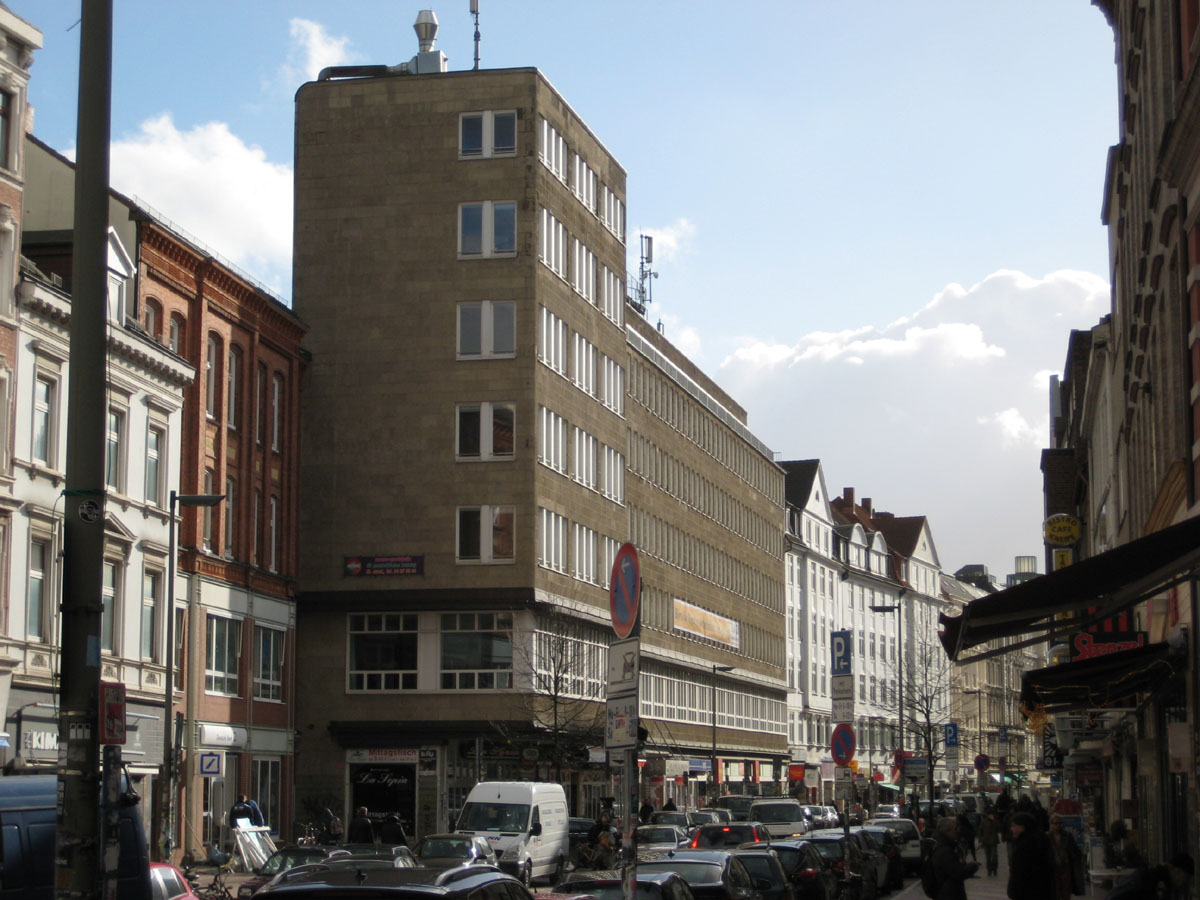
Boardinghouse des Westens

=== Altona 1930 ===
The Boardinghaus des Westens on Schulterblatt in today's Hamburg-Sternschanze in Germany was built in 1930 in the then independent city of Altona on a plot of land bordering Hamburg. It is a six-storey building with a strictly structured façade and a tower-like oriel projecting over the sidewalk and was designed by the architects Rudolf Klophaus, August Schoch and Erich zu Putlitz as a one-kitchen house. However, the owner C. Hinrichsen did not aim for communal living for the tenants, but rather individual living with the service of a hotel. The apartments were of different sizes and without kitchens; they could be rented with or without service or cleaning for longer or shorter periods. Restaurants and stores were located on the first floor. The form of housing was considered fashionable and expensive, but it failed within a few years. Small apartments were set up as early as 1933, and in 1941 it was converted into an administrative building.

=== Stockholm 1935 ===
The Kollektivhuset in Stockholm was built between 1932 and 1935 as a six-storey functionalist building designed by the architect Sven Markelius. The fifty apartments were small and without kitchens; the focus was on the communal facilities of the central kitchen, dining room, kindergarten and roof terrace. Everyday chores were made easier by dumbwaiters, laundry chutes and a cleaning service. The collective life of working couples and families belonging to the Swedish intellectual élite received increased public attention as a pilot housing-project of the Swedish welfare state. The childcare was based on the anti-authoritarian education concept of the sociologist Alva Myrdal and was accompanied by pedagogical research and studies. After ten years, the project was considered a failure because the community had fallen out.

=== London 1933 ===
The Isokon Building by architect Wells Coates in London is also considered an experiment in collective living. It was initiated by the married couple Molly and Jack Pritchard, who were both builders and residents of the building. It comprised 34 apartments, equipped with small kitchenettes. Food was mainly supplied via a central kitchen, which was connected to the individual units by a transport system known as a "dumb waiter". There was also an organized cleaning, laundry and shoe-shine service. The residents were considered left-wing intellectuals, among them at times Marcel Breuer, Agatha Christie, Walter Gropius, László Moholy-Nagy, Michael Rachlis and James Stirling; also at times Adrian Stokes, Henry Moore and the communist agents Arnold Deutsch and Melita Norwood. In 1972 the house was sold and fell into disrepair; in 2003 it was saved as an architectural monument and restored as an apartment complex. It has since been inhabited by professional specialists ("key workers") from the public sector.

== Further development in the Unités d'Habitation ==
As a further development, Le Corbusier designed the Ville Radieuse, the vertical city, from 1930, with reference to the Russian Narkomfin building. The large buildings contained the concept of a functional urban system, divided into usage zones with living, production, transport and supply areas, landscaped with hanging gardens and a centralization of services and housekeeping.

Le Corbusier's concepts were partially implemented in the Unités d'Habitation, which were realized between 1947 and 1964 in the four French cities of Marseille, Nantes, Briey and Firminy as well as in Berlin. These are 17- to 18-storey high-rise buildings in reinforced concrete skeleton construction, each with more than three hundred apartments. Extensive infrastructural and cultural facilities were planned for all five projects, such as kindergartens, roof terraces with swimming pools, training tracks and observation towers, sports halls, classrooms, studio stages, open-air theaters, restaurants and bars. Halfway up the buildings, on the seventh and eighth floors, internal streets known as "rue intérieure" were planned with rows of stores and service outlets. Only the Cité radieuse was realized on this scale in Marseille in 1947. The other four buildings had to be cut back due to financing problems. In the Berlin Corbusierhaus, for example, the communal roof facilities gave way to the technical superstructures of the elevators and ventilation systems, and the roof area is not available to the residents.

In contrast to the planning, the residential units of the Unité d'Habitation were equipped with kitchens. During the realization, Le Corbusier abandoned the concept originally intended as an intervention in social development. Instead of new social content in the housing form, the large housing complexes became abstract organizational schemes of a functional city.

== List of single kitchen houses ==
The following table provides a summary overview of the buildings that were designed as single-kitchen houses in European cities between 1903 and 1965. The Existing column lists the year up to which the central kitchen facility existed in each case, while the Planning stage indicates that the original designs were not implemented,

House	Year of construction	Stock	Architects	Organisation	Illustration
Service House; Kopenhagen	1903	1942	Otto Fick	Private company with participation	zentriert
Home farm Centralkök; Stockholm; Östermalmgatan 68	1906	1918	Georg Hagström, Fritiof Ekman	Private company	zentriert
Single-kitchen house Charlottenburg; Berlin; Kuno-Fischer-Straße 13	1908	1913	Kurt Jähler	Private company / limited liability company	zentriert
Single-kitchen house s Lichterfelde; Berlin; Unter den Eichen 53	1909	1915	Hermann Muthesius	Private company / limited liability company	zentriert
Single-kitchen house Friedenau; Berlin; Wilhelmshöher Straße 17–20	1909	1917/18	Albert Gessner	Private company / limited liability company	zentriert
Homesgarth (Solershot House); Letchworth Garden City	1909/10	not known	Clapham Lander	Cooperative	zentriert
Heimhof-Frauenwohnheim; Wien; Peter-Jordan-Straße 32–34	1911	not known	Dorfmeister and Weigang Architects	Cooperative	
Theresienhof; Graz; Auersperggasse 14	1914/15	not known	Andreas Gisshammer	Cooperative	zentriert
Amerikanerhaus; Zürich	1916/17	up to construction planning	Oskar Schwank	Cooperative of craftsmen involved in the construction	zentriert
Ledigenheim Dulsberg; Hamburg; Elsässer Straße 8–10/ Memeler Straße	1921	not known	Fritz Schumacher	Public housing construction	zentriert
Heimhof; Wien; Pilgerimgasse 22–24	1922/1926	1934	Otto Polak-Hellwig	Cooperative	zentriert
Het Nieuwe Huis; Amsterdam; Roelof Hartplein 50	1927/28	not known	Barend van den Nieuwen Amstel	Cooperative	zentriert
Narkomfin; Moskau; Nowinski-Boulevard	1928	1932	Moissei Ginsburg, Ingnatij Milinis	Public housing construction	zentriert
Ledigenheim Werkbundsiedlung; Breslau; Werkbundsiedlung, Haus 31	1929	not known	Hans Scharoun	Private company, sponsored	zentriert
Boardinghouse des Westens; Hamburg; Schulterblatt 36	1930/31	1933	Rudolf Klophaus, August Schoch, Erich zu Putlitz	Private company	zentriert
Kollektivhuset; Stockholm; John Ericsonsgatan 6	1932/1935	1945	Sven Markelius	Public housing construction	zentriert
Isokon Building; London	1933/34	1970	Wells Coates	Private company	zentriert
Unité d’Habitation; Marseille	1947	Planning stage	Le Corbusier	Public housing construction	
Cité radieuse de Rezè; Nantes	1955	Planning stage	Le Corbusier	Public housing construction	zentriert
Corbusierhaus; Berlin	1958	Planning stage	Le Corbusier	Public housing construction	zentriert
Unité d'Habitation; Briey en Forêt	1963	Planning stage	Le Corbusier	Public housing construction	
Unité d’Habitation; Firminy	1965	Planning stage	Le Corbusier	Public housing construction	zentriert

== Literature ==
- Architekten- und Ingenieurverein zu Berlin (Hrsg.): Berlin und seine Bauten. Teil IV: Wohnungsbau. Band B: Die Wohngebäude – Mehrfamilienhäuser. Berlin 1974, ISBN 3-433-0066-4.
- Lily Braun: Frauenarbeit und Hauswirtschaft. Expedition der Buchhandlung Vorwärts, Berlin 1901.
- Florentina Freise: Asketischer Komfort. Das Londoner Servicehaus Isokon. Athena-Verlag, Oberhausen 2009, ISBN 978-3-89896-321-3.
- Hartmut Häußermann, Walter Siebel: Soziologie des Wohnens. Juventa Verlag, Weinheim / München 1996, ISBN 3-7799-0395-4.
- Dolores Hayden: Redesigning the American Dream: Gender, Housing, and Family Life. W.W. Norton & Company, New York 1984. (Neuauflage 2002, ISBN 0-393-73094-8)
- Hermann Hipp: Wohnstadt Hamburg. Mietshäuser zwischen Inflation und Weltwirtschaftskrise. Nicolaische Verlagsbuchhandlung, Berlin 2009, ISBN 978-3-89479-483-5.
- Staffan Lamm, Thomas Steinfeld: Das Kollektivhaus. Utopie und Wirklichkeit eines Wohnexperiments. Fischer Verlag, Frankfurt am Main 2006, ISBN 3-10-043924-4.
- Claire Richter: Das Ökonomiat. Hauswirtschaftlicher Großbetrieb zum Selbstzweck. Berlin 1919.
- Ulla Terlinden, Susanna von Oertzen: Die Wohnungsfrage ist Frauensache! Frauenbewegung und Wohnreform 1870 bis 1933. Dietrich Reimer Verlag, Berlin 2006, ISBN 3-496-01350-8.
- Günther Uhlig: Kollektivmodell „Einküchenhaus". Wohnreform und Architekturdebatte zwischen Frauenbewegung und Funktionalismus 1900–1933. (= Werkbund Archiv. 6). Anabas Verlag, Gießen 1981, ISBN 3-87038-075-6.
