= Fries (surname) =

Fries (pronounced "frees") is a surname. Notable people with the surname include:

- Adelaide Fries (1871–1949), scholar of the history and genealogy of Moravians
- Amalie Fries (1823–1887), stage actor
- Amos Fries (1873–1963), American army general
- Bengt Fredrik Fries (1799–1839), Swedish zoologist
- Bernhard Fries (1820–1879), German painter
- Charles Arthur Fries (1854–1940), American painter
- Charles Carpenter Fries (1887–1967), American structural linguist and language teacher
- David Fries (born 1960), American scientist
- Ed Fries, American video game programmer and entrepreneur
- Elias Magnus Fries (1794–1878), Swedish botanist
- Ellen Fries (1855–1900), Swedish writer
- Ernst Fries (1801–1833), German painter
- Fabrice Fries (born 1960), French business executive
- Francis Henry Fries (1855–1931), American textile businessman and industrialist
- Frank W. Fries (1893–1980), American politician
- Fritz Rudolf Fries (1935–2014), German writer and translator
- George Fries (1799–1866), physician and politician
- Gladys Fries Harriman (1896–1983), American philanthropist
- Hanni Fries, Swiss orienteering competitor
- Hans Fries (1460–1520), Swiss painter
- Heinrich de Fries (1887–1938), German architect
- Hjalmar Fries (1891–1973), Norwegian actor and theater director
- Hugo Friedrich Fries (1818–1889), German judge
- Jacob H. Fries (born 1978), American journalist
- Jakob Friedrich Fries (1773–1843), German philosopher
- James F. Fries (1938–2021), American rheumatologist and author
- Johann von Fries (1719–1785), counsellor, director of the imperial silk factories, industrialist and banker
- Johannes Fries (1505–1565), Swiss theologian
- John Edmund Fries (1885–1955), American football player and coach
- John Fries (1764–1825), American tax rebel and namesake of the Fries' Rebellion
- Karl Friedrich Fries (1831–1871), painter
- Karl Theophil Fries (1875–1962), German chemist
- Kenny Fries (born 1960), American memoirist and poet
- Kristina Fries (born 1962), Swedish sport shooter
- Lorenz Fries, Laurentius Frisius (c.1490 – c.1532) German physician, astrologer and cartographer
- Liv Lisa Fries (born 1990), German actress
- Matthew Fries (born 1968), American jazz pianist, composer, and educator
- Mike Fries (born 1963), businessman
- Otto Fries (1887–1938), American film actor
- Pascal Fries (born 1972), German neurophysiologist
- Pete Fries (1857–1937), American baseball player
- Philipp Fries (1882–1950), German politician
- Pia Fries (born 1955), Swiss painter
- Robert Elias Fries (1876–1966), Swedish botanist
- Sebastian Fries (born 1993), German footballer
- Sherwood Fries (1920–1986), American football player
- Theodor Magnus Fries (1832–1913), Swedish botanist
- Thore Christian Elias Fries (1886–1930), Swedish botanist
- Tom Fries (born 1942), American politician
- Walter Fries (1894–1982), German general
- Will Fries (born 1998), American football player
- William Dale Fries (1928–2022), American country singer-songwriter better known as C. W. McCall

== Characters ==
- Victor Fries, a DC Comics character, also known as Mr. Freeze
- Nora Fries, a DC Comics character, wife to Mr. Freeze

== See also ==
- Defries, surname
- Friess, surname
