= Friesz =

Friesz is a surname. Notable people with the surname include:

- John Friesz (born 1967), American football player
- Lance Friesz (born 1983), American soccer player
- Othon Friesz (1879–1949), French artist
- Terry Friesz (born 1949), American academic

== See also ==
- Fries (surname)
- Friess
