= Defries =

Defries, DeFries, or De Fries is a surname. Notable people with the surname include:

== People ==
- Colin Defries (1884–1963), English racing driver and pilot
- Emma DeFries (1925–1980), American Hawaiian mystic, musician, activist, and cultural educator
- Heinrich de Fries (1887–1938), German architect
- Joel Defries (born 1985), British-born presenter
- John C. DeFries (born 1934), American geneticist
- Phil De Fries (born 1987), British mixed martial artist
- Robert Defries (1889–1975), Canadian physician
- Ruth DeFries (born 1956), American environmental geographer
- Tony Defries (born 1943), British music manager and impresario

== See also ==
- Fries (surname)
