= Friess =

Friess is a surname. Notable people with the surname include:

- Aline Friess (born 2003), French artistic gymnast
- Constance Friess Holman (1908–1999), American physician
- Donna Lewis Friess (born 1943), American author and activist
- Foster Friess (1940–2021), American investment manager
- Horace L. Friess (1900–1975), American ethicist
- Jörg Friess (born 1968), German triple-jumper
- Katherine Friess, American attorney who worked on efforts to overturn 2020 election

== See also ==
- Fries (surname)
- Friesz, surname
