= Matthew Fries =

- Born: September 24, 1968 (age 56); Selinsgrove, Pennsylvania
- Genres: jazz
- Occupation(s): jazz pianist, composer, educator, musician
- Instrument: piano
- Years active: 1996–present
- Labels: Concord Records
- Website: MatthewFries.com

Matthew Fries (born September 24, 1968) is an American jazz pianist, composer, educator and winner of the 1997 Great American Jazz Piano Competition.

== Early life and education ==
Born into a musical family in Selinsgrove, Pennsylvania, Matthew Fries began studying piano and music theory under the tutelage of his father John Fries at an early age. John was a piano professor at Susquehanna University from 1966-1996. His mother Harriet was a classical vocalist, choir director and an original member of the Susquehanna Valley Chorale.

Fries received a Bachelor of Music degree from Ithaca College in 1990 and a Master of Music degree from the University of Tennessee in 1993, both in Jazz Studies. His jazz piano teachers include Donald Brown, James Williams, and Mulgrew Miller.

== Mid-Career: Great American Jazz Piano Competition and New York City ==
In 1997 Fries won The Great American Jazz Piano Competition in Jacksonville, Florida, which was associated with the Jacksonville Jazz Festival. He placed second in the competition the year before. In 1998 Fries was a finalist and runner-up in the American Piano Awards Jazz Piano Competition.

Fries' debut as a leader, "Song for Today," was released in 2001 and was named a JAZZIZ Magazine Critic's Pick for the year. After moving to New York City, Fries established the collaborative jazz piano trio TRI-FI, which features Phil Palombi on bass and Keith Hall on drums and has released five albums to date. DownBeat gave 2014's "Staring into the Sun" a 4-star review, citing the ensemble's "intimate group interplay."

Fries is known as an accompanist for jazz vocalist Curtis Stigers, with whom he recorded four albums on Concord Records.

He has since performed with a diverse group of musicians including Ann Hampton Callaway, DeeDee Bridgewater, Vincent Herring, Steve Wilson, Dave Samuels, Claudio Roditi, and Terell Stafford.

Fries has performed as both a leader and sideman at notable jazz clubs such as the Blue Note Jazz Club in New York City, Smalls Jazz Club, Birdland and Ronnie Scott's Jazz Club in London.

== Kalamazoo: Western Michigan University ==
Fries is currently Assistant Professor of Jazz Piano at Western Michigan University School of Music.

== Selected discography ==
- Parallel States solo piano (2016, Xcappa Records)
- Staring Into the Sun with TRI-FI (2014, Independent)
- Sputnik (2014)
- Three with TRI-FI (2011, Independent)
- A TRI-FI Christmas with TRI-FI (2011, Independent)
- Hooray for Love with Curtis Stigers (2014, Concord Records)
- Lost in Dreams with Curtis Stigers (2009, Concord Records)
- Real Emotional with Curtis Stigers (2007, Concord Records)
- Postcards with TRI-FI (2007)
- TRI-FI with TRI-FI (2005)
- I Think It's Going To Rain Today with Curtis Stigers (2005, Concord Records)
- Live at Smalls, Vol. 2 with Bill Mobley Orchestra (2002, Space Time Records)
- Song for Today (2001, TCB Music)
- Live at Smalls, Vol. 1 with Bill Mobley Orchestra (1998, Space Time Records)
