= Erich zu Putlitz =

German architect

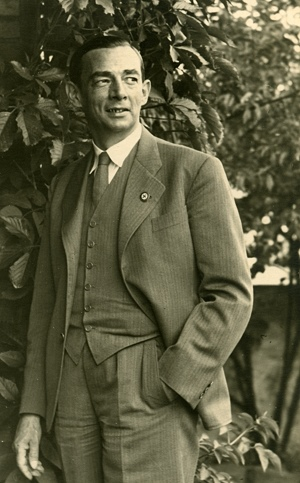
- Born: 1 February 1892; Brahlstorf, Germany
- Died: 28 February 1945 (aged 53); Hamburg, Germany
- Occupation: Architect

Erich zu Putlitz (1 February 1892 – 28 January 1945) was a German architect. His work was part of the architecture event in the art competition at the 1936 Summer Olympics.
