= Amalie Fries =

Czech stage actress

Amalie Fries (c. 1823–8 Oct 1887) was an actress and singer active in Bohemia.

Her origin is not known. She performed in Bohemia in a traveling theater company from 1839.

She was engaged at the Estates Theatre in Prague from 1846 to 1878, where she was among the theatre's star attractions. She was known for her roles as a heroine and confidant within comedy and farce. She was described as hard-working, dutiful, and beautiful, and was a popular actor.

She was not only an actor but also a singer. She was regarded as a more able singer than an actor and was often engaged to perform as a singer when the theater offered singing roles. Few other actors that the Estates Theatre were engaged for as many years as she was, probably because she was known to happily take whichever part she was assigned in a production. She also weathered multiple director changes at the theatre, which usually resulted in significant actor turnover.

After her retirement from the stage in 1878, Fries continued to make herself available for guest appearances for several more years and also received a pension from the Estates Theatre. She died on October 8, 1887, aged 64.
