= Heinrich de Fries =

German architect

- Born: 30 November 1887; Berlin, Germany
- Died: 11 September 1938 (aged 50); Werder, Germany
- Occupation: Architect

Heinrich de Fries (30 November 1887 – 11 September 1938) was a German architect. His work was part of the architecture event in the art competition at the 1928 Summer Olympics.
