= Art in the San Francisco Bay Area =

The history of art in the San Francisco Bay Area includes major contributions to contemporary art, including Abstract Expressionism. The area is known for its cross-disciplinary artists like Bruce Conner, Bruce Nauman, and Peter Voulkos as well as a large number of non-profit alternative art spaces. San Francisco Bay Area Visual Arts has undergone many permutations paralleling innovation and hybridity in literature and theater.

== Artists, from 1950–present ==
Paralleling a new interest in eastern philosophy and Zen via Alan Watts and the literary and poetic irreverence of Lawrence Ferlinghetti, Allen Ginsberg, and others, visual artists such as Bruce Conner and Jay DeFeo diverged from the Abstract Expressionism of the east coast to make connections between sculpture and painting. Connor's found material assemblages, collages and experimental films make him an early cross-disciplinary pioneer.

Painter Wayne Thiebaud's paintings of commonplace products such as toys or gumball machines paralleled the pop influenced Funk style. Involving bright colors, humor and word-play, Funk is most often associated with the ceramic work of Robert Arneson, and the paintings of William T. Wiley. All three, along with Roy De Forest and Manuel Neri taught at UC Davis in the 60s and 70s. (Artist and educator Peter Voulkos set the stage for Funk by reengaging ceramics as part of contemporary studio practice.) Bruce Nauman, who is often credited with dissolving the medium specific practices of previous generations, went to UC Davis and studied under William Wiley.

By the end of the 1960s Conceptual Art and Minimal Art were reforming the aesthetics and values of visual art. Bay Area artists responded to the dominance of the white cube, and transitioned from an object-oriented to a systems-oriented practice inspired by Marcel Duchamp. In the Bay Area, starting in the 1970s, Artists such as Tom Marioni, Paul Kos, Howard Fried and Terry Fox, explored the intersection of performance and sculpture. Also picking up on conceptualism, with an added materialist strain, was David Ireland. Tony Labat brought a political dimension to Bay Area conceptualism, with video, performance and installation works that confronted issues of cultural identity, loss and displacement.

In 1967 The Experimental Television Project (later renamed the National Center for Experiments in Television), housed at KQED studios was one of the first programs in the nation to give artists access to television studios and equipment. Groups like Ant Farm, Video Free America, and T.R. Uthco working in the same moment were video recording "happening" performances, and experimenting with light sound and time.

== Public art ==
The San Francisco Bay Area has a variety of public art, with murals (and graffiti) in many locations, including most notably Clarion Alley, Balmy Alley, and 41 Ross (Ross Alley murals in San Francisco's Chinatown).

== Art spaces and groups ==
=== San Francisco active ===
- Acción Latina's Juan R. Fuentes Gallery
- Artists' Television Access
- Asian American Women Artists Association
- The Box Shop, San Francisco
- Chinese Culture Center
- CounterPulse
- Creativity Explored
- Galería de la Raza
- Gray Area Foundation for the Arts
- Intersection for the Arts
- Kadist
- The LAB
- The Laundry SF
- Luggage Store Gallery and 509 Cultural Center
- Metal Arts Guild of San Francisco
- Minnesota Street Project
- Mission Cultural Center for Latino Art
- Root Division
- Saint Joseph's Arts Society
- San Francisco Arts Commission
- SF Camerawork
- SOMArts Cultural Center
- Southern Exposure
- Yerba Buena Center for the Arts

=== East Bay active ===
- Arts Benicia
- Berkeley Art Center
- Creative Growth Art Center
- Firehouse Arts Center
- Firehouse Art Collective
- Kala Art Institute, Berkeley
- Richmond Art Center

=== North Bay active ===
- Gallery Route One, Pt Reyes Station
- Golden Gate Marin Artists, Marin County
- Headlands Center for the Arts, Marin County
- Marin Art and Garden Center, Ross
- Marin Society of Artists, San Rafael

=== South Bay and Peninsula active ===
- Institute of Contemporary Art San José
- Montalvo Arts Center, Saratoga
- Movimiento de Arte y Cultura Latino Americana, San Jose
- Pacific Art League, Palo Alto
- Pacifica Center for the Arts
- Palo Alto Art Center
- Sanchez Art Center, Pacifica
- WORKS San José

=== Defunct art spaces ===
- Femina Potens
- La Mamelle, Inc./Art Com
- Museum of Craft and Folk Art
- New Langton Arts
- The Rainbow Sign
- Savernack Street
- Walter and McBean Galleries

== Art schools and workshops ==
=== Active schools and workshops ===
- Academy of Art University
- California College of the Arts
- Creativity Explored (offering classes)
- Creative Growth Art Center
- Gray Area Foundation for the Arts (offering classes)
- Mission Cultural Center for Latino Arts (offering classes)
- NIAD Art Center
- Pacific Art League, Palo Alto (offering classes)
- Palo Alto Art Center (offering classes)
- Richmond Art Center (offering classes)
- Root Division (offering classes)
- Ruth Asawa San Francisco School of the Arts

=== Defunct schools and workshops ===
- Pond Farm (or Pond Farm Workshops; c. 1939–c. 1953)
- Rudolph Schaeffer School of Design (1924–1984)
- San Francisco Art Institute (1871–2022)

== See also ==
- Art in the San Francisco Bay Area, 1945-1980, a comprehensive history of the period, by Thomas Albright.
- Category:Artists from the San Francisco Bay Area
- Bolinas, an artists colony in Marin County
