= Disability in the United States =

People with disabilities in the United States are a significant minority group, that make up a fifth of the overall population and over half of Americans older than eighty. There is a complex history underlying the U.S. and its relationship with its disabled population, with great progress being made in the last century to improve the livelihood of disabled citizens through legislation providing protections and benefits. Most notably, the Americans with Disabilities Act is a comprehensive anti-discrimination policy that works to protect Americans with disabilities in public settings and the workplace. More than 1 in 4 adults in the U.S. have a disability, making up about 28.7 percent of the population.

== Definitions ==
According to the Social Security Advisory Board, when the federal government first began provisioning funds for state-run disability assistance programs, eligible beneficiaries were defined as needing to be "totally and permanently disabled". In 1956, this definition was expanded by the Disability Insurance Program to describe disability as the "inability to engage in any substantial gainful activity by reason of any medically determinable physical or mental impairment which can be expected to result in death or to be of long-continued and indefinite duration." Critics indicated that this language limited the concept of disability to an occupational scope, and more holistic definitions were adopted as time passed. The modern consensus on disability within governmental, medical, sociological realms in the United States is that it includes impairments that either physically or mentally incapacitate individuals from engaging in life activities, or the perception of possessing such an impairment. The World Health Organization(WHO) defines disability as any condition that affects the body, mind, and ability to express physical vitality and interact with the social world. Disabled populations are diverse and range in need, and some disabilities are often hard to notice. In a 2013 study, the Centers for Disease Control and Prevention (CDC) evaluated disability across five dimensions: vision, cognition, mobility, self-care, and independent living. Specific conditions that fall under this umbrella vary circumstantially, however it is broadly accepted that disability includes, but is not limited to the following:

- Autism
- Autoimmune conditions (ex. lupus, fibromyalgia, rheumatoid arthritis, HIV/AIDS)
- Blindness or poor vision
- Cancer
- Cardiovascular or heart disease
- Celiac disease
- Cerebral palsy
- Deaf or hard of hearing
- Depression or anxiety
- Diabetes
- Epilepsy
- Gastrointestinal disorders (ex. Crohn's disease, Irritable bowel syndrome)
- Intellectual disability
- Missing limbs or partially missing limbs
- Nervous system conditions (ex. migraine headaches, MS, Parkinson's disease)
- Psychiatric conditions (ex. bipolar disorder, major depressive disorder, post-traumatic stress disorder, schizophrenia)

== History ==
At a federal level, legislation pertaining to disability was limited in the 18th and 19th centuries, with notable laws at that time including an act for the relief of sick and disabled seamen, which was signed by John Adams in 1798. In the early 1900s eugenic sterilization laws were passed in several states, permitting governments to conduct forced sterilization on individuals with mental disorders. The 1927 Supreme Court case Buck v Bell upheld the constitutionality of such legislation, with such laws being banned nearly half a century later with the 1978 Federal Sterilization Legislation, although loopholes have been exploited with such sterilizations continuing into modern times. The burgeoning of disability rights legislation in the 1900s came after World War I with congress' establishment of the Rehabilitation Programs, which provided education and healthcare support to recovering veterans. Significant progress came in the 1930s with the presidential election of Franklin D. Roosevelt, who was physically disabled himself, and his signage of the Social Security Act.

One of the first prominent groups that formed together to advocate for Disability Rights in America, was the League of the Physically Handicapped. The League of the Physically Handicapped was organized in the early 1930s. This group was very outspoken against Franklin D. Roosevelt, and about how disabled people were being discriminated against in the workplace. As a result, The League of the Physically Handicapped were targeted by the Roosevelt administration. More progress towards disability justice came in hand with the civil rights movement in the latter half of the 20th century. In 1961 the American National Standards Institute published a document overviewing building accessibility limitations for physically disabled individuals, which supported the passage of the Architectural Barriers Act of 1968 and encouraged several states to adopt inclusive accessibility legislation in the '70s. Additionally in the 1960s, Medicaid and the Mental Retardation Facilities and Community Mental Health Centers Construction Act were passed, allocating funds towards healthcare and the developments of statewide councils, advocacy frameworks, and post-secondary education pathways for disabled citizens. In the 1970s major anti-discrimination legislation was enacted with the repeal of the last "Ugly law", which permitted law enforcement to incarcerate people for appearing disabled, as well as the 1973 Rehabilitation Act and Individuals with Disabilities Education Act (IDEA) which prevented institutions that received public funding from discriminating on disability status. The 1980s oversaw saw an additional movement towards accessibility with the passage of the Air Carrier Access Act, Fair Housing Amendments Act, and Technology-Related Assistance for Individuals with Disabilities Act and justice with the creation of the Civil Rights of Institutionalized Persons Act (CRIPA).

In 1990, the Americans with Disabilities Act (ADA) served as a landmark bill outlining more comprehensive protections and accommodations for the disabled community, with other legislation, introduced later that decade such as the 1996 Telecommunications Act and the Ticket to Work and Work Incentives Improvement Act (TWWIIA) expanding upon the ADA. The turn of the Millennium oversaw crucial Supreme Court cases such as Olmstead v. L.C. and Tennessee v. Lane which upheld federally outlined disability rights.

== Demographics ==
According to the Disability Status: 2019 - Census 2019 Brief approximately 20 percent of Americans have one or more diagnosed psychological or physical disability:

Census 2000 counted 49.7 million people with some type of long-lasting condition or disability. They represented 19.3 percent of the 257.2 million people who were aged 5 and older in the civilian non-institutionalized population – or nearly one person in five...

This percentage varies depending on how disabilities are defined. It may be helpful to note that disability in the United States is classified under different types of physical or mental impairments of which include one's ability to physically function, mental status, including decision skills and memory, the ability of sight, if they are self-sufficient, and finally, if they depend on anyone to help them do tasks. According to Census Brief 97-5, "About 1 in 5 Americans have some kind of disability, and 1 in 10 have a severe disability. Not only does this statistic affect those who are disabled, but individuals with disabilities not only endure disadvantages but so do their children or possibly grandchildren as they can potentially be left facing health care disadvantages as well as education."

The United States Census Bureau is legally charged with developing information on the type and prevalence of disability in the population. Statistics reveal the highest percentage of individuals with a disability reside in southern areas such as Texas, Florida, Mississippi, and anywhere along the southern coast. The states that include the fewest disabled individuals are western areas of which will include Wyoming, Colorado, and Utah. These disabled people are protected by three primary laws. They include the Americans with Disabilities Act, the Individuals with Disabilities Education Act, and Section 504 of the Rehabilitation Act. The primary purpose of collecting ACS data on disability is to help the U.S. Congress determine the allocation of federal funds and inform policies. It is also used to identify the characteristics of the disabled population of the United States. Determining the number and geographical location of people with disabilities is crucial for policies aimed at providing services like public transportation.

ACS does not directly measure disability There are other smaller survey studies that provide some insight on disability in the U.S. While studies like the National Health Interview Survey the Health and Retirement Study, the Behavioral Risk Factor Surveillance System, and the Health, Aging, and Body Composition (Health ABC) Study are used to infer valuable disability-related health characteristics in the U.S. population. While responses to these items are commonly refer to as "disability", it could be argued the —it uses self- and proxy-reports to evaluate perceived ability to perform functional tasks. Existing publications have delineated details on the U.S. population regarding disability by using information from the ACS. Publications have also outlined issues with disability data in the ACS. Research on disability continues to improve, and potential remedies are found for current methodological challenges. Because of the uniqueness, regarding federal funding and policy, researchers from various fields (e.g., sociology, epidemiology, and government) make wide use of ACS data to better understand disability in the U.S.

=== African Americans ===
According to the 2000 U.S. Census, the African American community has the highest rate of disability in the United States at 20.8 percent, slightly higher than the overall disability rate of 19.4 percent. Given these statistics, it can be suggested that African Americans with disabilities experience the most severe underemployment, unemployment, and under-education compared to other disability groups. For instance, the 2015 American Community Survey indicates that African Americans who have disabilities live in poverty at a rate of 1.5 to 2 times greater than other racial groups in America.

==== Criminal justice ====
Data obtained in the National Longitudinal Survey of Youth indicates that Black men with disabilities encounter the greatest cumulative probability of being arrested by age 28, in contrast to others with either different gender, disability, or race status. With respect to African American women re-entering society after serving time, a JHCPCU article identified disability, more specifically positive HIV/HCV status, as a major factor correlated with lowered usage of various modes of health care such as alternative and emergency care. Calls for civil rights and criminal justice reform with the Black Lives Matter movement have brought into public eye how Black individuals with disabilities disproportionately experience police violence. Instances cited as police brutality, such as the 2018 killing of Marcus-David Peters, an unarmed black man experiencing a mental health crisis, has motivated legislation such as Virginia's Mental Health Awareness Response and Community Understanding Services (MARCUS) alert bill, which would necessitate that cases of individual mental distress be attended to by both police and mental health professionals. Viral footage of the killing of Walter Wallace, a black man with a history of mental illness who was killed during a police encounter, has helped bring the Black Disabled Lives Matter movement into the public eye.

==== Education ====
Work published in the Journal of African American History suggest that the enduring consequences of segregation and separation of special education classrooms can potential have a negative compound effect on the quality of education for African American students with disabilities. An article in the Harvard Educational Review suggests that educational pedagogy designed to "cross-pollinate" across race and disability coalitions is an effective way to combat exclusion that particularly impacts Black disabled children.

==== Employment ====
In 2025, the employment-population ratio was 22.8 percent for people with a disability and 65.2 percent for people without a disability. Among people with a disability ages 16 to 64, the ratio was 38.1 percent. The unemployment rate was 8.3 percent for people with a disability, compared with 4.1 percent for those without a disability. Because the October 2025 Current Population Survey was not collected during a federal government shutdown, the 2025 annual estimates use 11-month averages and are not strictly comparable with annual averages for other years.

According to a study published in the Journal of Disability Policy, Black people with disabilities experience significantly higher unemployment and lower monthly wages compared to the overall disabled community and general population. A research paper in the Journal of Applied Rehabilitation Counseling reported that counseling professionals identified that disability status can limit employment prospects of Black and Latino offenders seeking work opportunities.

==== Healthcare ====
Disabled Black Americans face barriers to receiving comprehensive medical care to address their pre-existing health conditions. In studies published in the Journals of Applied Gerontology it was noted that elderly African American women face a greater likelihood of acquiring disability in comparison their white counterparts, and additionally are more likely to rely on medicaid for coverage. The same journal articles established a correlation between being uninsured or utilizing medicaid coverage with greater levels of disability. With respect to disabled youth, it was found that when controlling for socioeconomic and insurance status, Hispanic and Black children with disabilities were less likely to have received specialty medical care in comparison to children from other racial backgrounds according to research published in the journal PEDIATRICS.

== Disparities ==
=== Discrimination in employment ===
The Rehabilitation Act of 1973 requires all organizations that receive government funding to provide accessibility programs and services. A more recent law, the Americans with Disabilities Act of 1990 (ADA), which came into effect in 1992, prohibits private employers, state and local governments, employment agencies, and labor unions from discriminating against qualified individuals with disabilities in job application procedures, hiring, firing, advancement, compensation, job training, or in the terms, conditions, and privileges of employment. This includes organizations like retail businesses, movie theaters, and restaurants. They must make reasonable accommodation to people with different needs. Protection is extended to anyone with (A) a physical or mental impairment that substantially limits one or more of the major life activities of an individual, (B) a record of such an impairment, or (C) being regarded as having such an impairment. The second and third criteria are seen as ensuring protection from unjust discrimination based on a perception of risk, just because someone has a record of impairment or appears to have a disability or illness (e.g. features which may be erroneously taken as signs of an illness). Employment protection laws make discrimination against qualified individuals with a disability illegal and may also require the provision of reasonable accommodation. Reasonable accommodations includes changes in the physical environment like making facilities more accessible but also include increasing job flexibility like job restructuring, part-time or modified work schedules or reassignment to vacant position. Though many hold attitudes that are more enlightened and informed than past years, the word "disability" carries few positive connotations for most employers. Negative attitudes by employers toward potential employees with disabilities can lead to misunderstanding and discrimination.

=== Healthcare disparities ===
The disability paradox, a concept that recognizes the tendency for individuals without disabilities to perceive their disabled counterparts as having poorer livelihoods than disabled individuals would view themselves, is perpetuated in healthcare settings, with research published in the Handbook of Disability Studies identifying that practitioners award lower quality of life scores to disabled individuals than a member of the general population would. An article in the Kennedy Institute of Ethics Journal expresses that as a consequence physicians frequently go into consults with rigid, skewed perceptions of their patient's disabilities. Anita Ho, a bioethicist, argues that heightened practitioner confidence can harmfully impact disabled individuals in this regard as it increases the likelihood that patients may distrust their physicians or conversely place excessive faith in their care provider's insight into their condition. Disparate in healthcare access also impact disabled populations, for instance, most rural areas — especially in the Great Plains region — have little or no government-organized medical support infrastructure for the permanently disabled indigent population which results in disability in the United States not only affecting individuals physically and mentally but socioeconomically as well.

=== Poverty ===
Investigations on the "poverty and disability nexus" have consistently shown poverty and disability are correlated for all race-ethnic groups within the United States. Financial stability of people with disabilities would decrease the dependence on governmental support programs. Studies have been done with the U.S. Census Bureau data to examine the high prevalence of disabilities among welfare recipients. Thirteen percent of families with children under the age of 18, who are also receiving welfare benefits, had at least one child with a disability. Families with income below twice the poverty line were 50 percent more likely to have a child with a disability than those families with higher incomes. Children with disabilities from families with annual household incomes of higher than $50,000 were more likely to attend higher education.

Research suggests higher education does impact employment and income opportunities for people with disabilities. It is also noted near equivocal employment opportunities and salaries for people with disabilities to their peers without disabilities. While only one-fifth of people in the U.S. have at least a four-year college degree, some studies note possessing a four-year degree is the difference between absolute job security and joblessness.

=== Media representation ===
According to the United Nations, "Persons with disabilities are seldom covered in the media, and when they are featured, they are often negatively stereotyped and not appropriately represented. It is not uncommon to see persons with disabilities treated as objects of pity, charity or medical treatment that have to overcome a tragic and disabling condition or conversely, presented as superheroes who have accomplished great feats, so as to inspire the non-disabled."

The European Disability Forum elaborates, "The media is an important source of information and entertainment for many people. When persons with disabilities are presented accurately and respectfully, it educates the public about the reality of living with a disability. It leads to more empathy and understanding, reducing stigma and misconceptions."

From The State of Disability Representation on Television: An Analysis of Scripted TV Series from 2016-2023 at the Geena Davis Institute, key findings include, "Overall, just 3.9% of characters have a disability. The share of characters with disabilities on TV ranged from a low of 2.6% in 2020 to a high of 4.7% in 2021. Statistical analysis indicates that there is no positive or negative trend in disability representation on screen over the eight years analyzed."

== Public resources ==
=== Social Security Administration ===
The Social Security Administration (SSA), defines disability in terms of an individual's inability to perform substantial gainful activity (SGA), by which it means "work paying minimum wage or better". The agency pairs SGA with a list of medical conditions that qualify individuals for disability benefits. Individuals who are disabled will receive insurance and this ensures they will always be getting paid when they must take time off work or cannot work due to the severity of their illness. The SSDI and the SSI are both social security programs that will assist in payments.

The SSA makes available to disabled Americans two forms of disability benefits: Social Security Disability Insurance, (SSDI) and Supplemental Security Income (SSI). Briefly, the SSDI is a program that is useful in the sense that it is like welfare, but you must have been able to work enough hours throughout your life and you must have paid social security taxes in order to be approved. This benefit is most useful for those who do not have severe disabilities or illnesses because those who are immobile will not have been able to work. The good thing about this benefit is not only does it benefit the individual, but it will benefit their family members as well. To go more in-depth, Social Security pays disability benefits to citizens who have worked long enough and have a medical condition that has prevented them from working or is expected to prevent them from working for at least 12 months or end in death. Looking at the SSI, the SSI insurance, or the Social Security Insurance program, is there to pay individual benefits who could not have worked or have little capital. However, for both of these insurances, the same approval is required by the individual's disability.

Some assistance ends if the beneficiary starts working. If that assistance (such as personal care or transportation) is necessary for work, it creates a welfare trap where it is not possible to work despite potentially being willing and able. Some programs do provide incentives to work.

=== Education ===
==== K-12 ====
Before the Individuals with Disabilities Education Act was passed, children with disabilities were at-risk of not receiving a free, appropriate public education, but each act protecting the disabled individuals protects different criteria of which include differentiation in schools, the law by which schools must be up to date on the K-12 act, and equal service for the public who extend any services. For IDEA to apply, the child must first be determined to be able to benefit from public education. This benefit is not exclusively limited to school-aged children but applies to children with disabilities from infancy.

Due to the societal stigma of disability, children are sometimes treated like disabled children, and not included in activities in which other children were able to participate. However, for These individuals with any type of disablement such as learning disabilities or physical disabilities, the Americans with Disabilities Act covers them. This act ensures no one is discriminated against beyond their own home of which includes work, school, and anywhere in public. The places it does not cover will include sanctioned or private areas including one's home. Educators can hold students with disabilities to lower expectations, which impacts their future educational attainment. Although their future may be impaired the K-12 act is broad amongst education and Section 504 of the Rehabilitation Act will help clarify. This act ensures individuals who attended schools, play on school sports teams, or attend any off or on-campus events will be protected unless that school is not funded by the government. These students must be given compromises that other students may not receive due to their impairments.

Under the Individuals with Disabilities Education Act, the school district must provide every disabled child with an Individualized Education Plan (IEP). The IEP is compiled by a team of school administrators and guardians and may include a child advocate, counselors, occupational therapists, or other specialists. The Individuals with Disabilities Education Act ensures all fees for schooling are discharged, but these children must be approved under IDEA and must be in a certain category of disabilities. This act allows for any student or child to be assessed and is provided extra incentives that may apply to their condition. The IEP also evaluates the goals for the child and determines what needs to be done in order for those goals to be met. Children with disabilities who do not have a parent or guardian advocating on their behalf are not as well served in the education system as their peers with parent or guardian advocates.

Transition preparation from K-12 education to post-secondary education or career was initially written into IDEA to begin at age 12, but in the existing law, transition preparation does not begin until age 16. While this law provides a maximum age at which to begin transition preparation, students with disabilities have been known to receive transition preparation at a younger age, as the states might mandate a younger age, or the IEP team might determine a younger age is appropriate to begin the transition preparation of the student. Some students with disabilities have noted not receiving any transition preparation at all. The transition services are to be designed to be results-oriented rather than outcome-oriented. This is to ensure the transition services are designed for the student's success. Students are intended to attend their transition planning meetings with the IEP, yet not all students do. Some do attend, yet generally not take a leadership role - only fourteen percent do. This places the students with a disability in a passive role instead of an agentic role in their own life plans. In a 2007 study of a higher education institution located in the Midwestern United States, it was found that one-third of students with disabilities felt their transition preparation was lacking. Many in this group were unaware of laws that pertained to disability and higher education. This leaves them without an understanding of their learning needs and unable to advocate for themselves.

==== Higher Education ====
Self-advocacy plays an important role in the success of students with disabilities in higher education. While the examination of self-advocacy skills has been largely limited to the impact in academic settings, self-advocacy skills, or the lack thereof, do also impact non-academic situations. A 2004 study noted that only 3 percent of students with disabilities had self-advocacy training. Students with disabilities who are confident about their disability identity and self-advocacy skills are more likely to disclose their disabilities and advocate for their needs when interacting with faculty and staff. Advocacy service is also provided to students as staff from different programs help instructors in college, understand the needs of disabled students who are attending their classes. So much so that when disable students need extra time to complete their course then some arrangements are made to accommodate such students. Students with disabilities who were embarrassed of their disability identity and did not understand their needs as learners looked to faculty and staff for solutions to accommodation needs. Education helps students with disabilities learn self-advocacy skills that affect their ability to advocate for their health, insurance, and other needs.

In spite of IDEA and Section 504 providing support for the education of people with disabilities, the educational outcomes of people with disabilities vary significantly from the outcomes of people without disabilities. After high school, a 2005 study found students with disabilities enroll in postsecondary education, whether college, technical school or vocational school, at a rate of 46 percent compared to the rate of 63 percent for students without disabilities. This rate is up 23 percent since 1990, when the Americans with Disabilities Act of 1990 was passed. Specifically to four-year degree-granting higher education institutions, 27 percent of students with disabilities attend compared to 54 percent of students without disabilities. High school completion and postsecondary education enrollment vary per disability type.

Students with disabilities are responsible for advocating for their accommodations and needs as learners in higher education environments. Some higher education institutions have an office for managing disabilities and accommodations (e.g. the University of Pittsburgh's Disability Resources & Services). Many higher education institutions have staff to work with students with disabilities on their accommodation requests. Higher education institutions do vary in process to obtain accommodations and accommodations provided. The staff members at the higher education institutions can recommend accommodations. The faculty members, however, may choose to vary or not implement the accommodations at all based upon concerns of weakening the academic integrity of the course or risking the possibility of endless accommodation requests. When working with faculty members about accommodations, nearly half of the students with disabilities recalled receiving a negative response, while the other half felt their faculty members were accommodating.

For people with disabilities, having a four-year college degree provides significant employment and salary advantages.

=== Employment and minimum wage exemption ===
More than 56 million Americans are enrolled in Medicare. Disabled citizens in the United States receive Medicare insurance and social security benefits to varying degrees. For those that seek employment for therapeutic or economic reasons, the Fair Labor Standards Act of 1938 is applicable. This act was an attempt to facilitate the large number of disabled servicemen returning from the front lines "to the extent necessary to prevent curtailment of opportunities for employment". Section 14(c) provides the employers with a method of paying their disabled employees less than applicable federal minimum wage. The Secretary of Labor issues certificates that align wages with the employee's productivity.

As of 2012 there are 420,000 §14(c) employees being paid less than the minimum wage of $7.25 per hour. Administratively, the wage for disabled people was informally set at 75 percent. Those working in sheltered work centers have no minimum floor for their wage. The Fair Wages for Workers with Disabilities Act was proposed in 2013 to repeal §14(c) but was not passed.

=== Insurance ===
It is illegal for California insurers to refuse to provide car insurance to properly licensed drivers solely because they have a disability. It is also illegal for them to refuse to provide car insurance "on the basis that the owner of the motor vehicle to be insured is blind", but they are allowed to exclude coverage for injuries and damages incurred while a blind unlicensed owner is actually operating the vehicle (the law is apparently structured to allow blind people to buy and insure cars which their friends, family, and caretakers can drive for them).

== Policies and legislation ==
The Department of Labor's 2014 rules for federal contractors, defined as companies that make more than $50,000/year from the federal government, required them to have as a goal that 7 percent of their workforce must be disabled people. In schools, the ADA requires that all classrooms must be wheelchair accessible. The U.S. Architectural and Transportation Barriers Compliance Board, commonly known as the Access Board, created the Rehabilitation Act of 1973 to help offer guidelines for transportation and accessibility for physically disabled people.

About 12.6 percent of the U.S. population are individuals who have a mental or physical disability. Many are unemployed because of prejudiced assumptions that a person with disabilities is unable to complete tasks that are commonly required in the workforce. This became a major human rights issue because of the discrimination that this group faced when trying to apply for jobs in the U.S. Many advocacy groups protested against such discrimination, asking the federal government to implement laws and policies that would help individuals with disabilities.

=== Rehabilitation Act of 1973 ===
The Rehabilitation Act of 1973 was enacted with the purpose of protecting individuals with disabilities from prejudicial treatment by government-funded programs, employers, and agencies. The Rehabilitation Act of 1973 has not only helped protect U.S. citizens from being discriminated against but it has also created confidence amongst individuals to feel more comfortable with their disability. There are many sections within The Rehabilitation Act of 1973, that contains detailed information about what is covered in this policy.

Section 501
An employer must hire an individual who meets the qualifications of a job description despite any preexisting disabilities.
Section 503
Requires contractors or subcontractors, who receive more than $10,000 from the government to hire people with disabilities and to accommodate them with the needs that they need to achieve in the workforce.
Section 504
States that receive federal money may not discriminate against any person with disabilities who qualifies for a program or job.

On June 22, 1999, the United States Supreme Court issued a ruling in Olmstead vs. L. C. that said unjustified segregation of persons with disabilities constitutes discrimination in violation of title II of the Americans with Disabilities Act. This has been interpreted as meaning people with disabilities must be given all opportunities by the government to stay in their own homes as opposed to assisted living, nursing homes or worse, institutions for disabled people. It has been interpreted as meaning the government must make all reasonable efforts to allow people with disabilities to be included in their respective communities and enjoy family and friends, work if possible, get married, own homes and interact with nondisabled people.

=== The Americans with Disabilities Act of 1990 ===
The federal government enacted the Americans with Disabilities Act of 1990 (ADA), which was created to allow equal opportunity for jobs, access to private and government-funded facilities, and transportation for disabled people. This act was created with the purpose to ensure that employers would not discriminate against any individual despite their disability. In 1990, data was gathered to show the percentage of disabled people who worked in the U.S. Out of the 13 percent who filled out the survey, only 53 percent of individuals with disabilities worked while 90 percent of this group population did not, the government wanted to change this, they wanted Americans with disabilities to have the same opportunities as those who did not have a disability. The ADA required corporations to not only hire qualified disabled people but also accommodate them and their needs.

Title I
Employment
An employer must give a qualified individual with disabilities the same opportunities as any other employee despite their disability. The employer must offer equal work privileges to someone who has a disability including but not limited to pay, work hours, training, etc. The employer must also create accommodations suitable for the person and their physical or mental disabilities.
Title II
State and Local Government Activities
Requires that the government give disabled people the same opportunities involving work, programs, building access, and services. Title II also requires that buildings create easy access for disabled people and provide communicators who will be able to help those with hearing or speaking impairments. Public spaces are however not required to create accommodations that would, in turn, alter their services as long as the services proved that they did all they could to prevent discrimination against disabled people.
Title II
Transportation
Public transportation should be customized so that disabled people may have easy access to public transit. Paratransit is a service that provides transportation to people who are unable to get from one destination to another due to their mental or physical disability.
Title III
Public Accommodations
Public accommodations require that private businesses create accommodations that will allow disabled people easy access to buildings. Private businesses may not discriminate against disabled people and must provide accommodations that are reasonable, alterations may be made so that a person with disabilities can have equal access to facilities that are provided, communicators for the hearing impaired, devices for the visually impaired, and wheelchair access. Facilities must regulate with the ADA, when regulating the building's infrastructure so it meets the ADA regulations.
Title IV
Telecommunication Relay Services
Requires telephone companies to have TRS seven days a week, twenty-four hours a day. It requires telephone companies to create accommodations for deaf and hard-of-hearing people by providing a third party able to assist both parties in communicating with one another.

== Disability culture ==
=== Media ===
The National Center on Disability and Journalism (NCDJ) provides resources and support to journalists and communications professionals covering disability issues. The center is headquartered at the Walter Cronkite School of Journalism and Mass Communication at Arizona State University.

=== Arts ===
There are many government initiatives that support the participation of people with disabilities in arts and cultural programs. Most U.S. state governments include an accessibility coordinator with their state arts agency or regional arts organization. There are a variety of non-governmental organizations (NGOs) and non-profit groups that support initiatives for inclusive arts and culture.

- Office for Accessibility at the National Endowment for the Arts
- Media Access Group at WGBH WGBH is the Public Television broadcaster for the Boston region. It has three divisions: the Caption Center, Descriptive Video Services (DVS), and the Carl and Ruth Shapiro Family National Center for Accessible Media (NCAM). WGBH pioneered accessible television and video in the U.S.
- International Center on Deafness and the Arts provides education, training, and arts projects in areas such as theatre, arts festivals, museums, dance, distance learning, and children's programming.

The development of disability arts in the U.S. is also tied to several non-profit organizations such as Creative Growth in Oakland, California, that serves adult artists with developmental, mental and physical disabilities, providing a professional studio environment for artistic development, gallery exhibition and representation and a social atmosphere among peers. Organizations with similar mandates in the Bay Area include Creativity Explored in San Francisco, and NIAD Art Center in Richmond, California.

== See also ==
- American Association of People with Disabilities
- List of disability organizations
- Timeline of disability rights in the United States
- Disability in American slavery
- Disability treatments in the United States
