= Kellem =

Kellem or Kellems is a surname. Notable people with the surname include:

- Jeremy Kellem (born 1989), American football player
- Vivien Kellems (1896–1975), American inventor

== See also ==
- Suzy Kellems Dominik, American artist
