= Fontanive =

Fontanive is a surname. Notable people with the surname include:

- Juan Fontanive (born 1977), American artist
- Nicola Fontanive (born 1985), Italian ice hockey player
- Petra Fontanive (born 1988), Swiss hurdler
