= Marlon Mullen =

American artist

- Born: 1963 (age 62–63); United States
- Occupation: painter
- Organization: NIAD Art Center

Marlon Mullen (born 1963) is a painter who lives and works in Contra Costa County, California, maintaining a studio practice at NIAD Art Center. He achieved widespread acclaim for his work when it was displayed at the 2019 Whitney Biennial. In 2024, Mullen became the first developmentally disabled person to have a solo exhibition at the Museum of Modern Art (MoMA) in New York.

== Life ==
Born in 1963 in Richmond, California, Mullen is autistic and is primarily nonverbal.

== Artistic practice ==
Mullen has maintained his art practice at NIAD (Nurturing Independence through Artistic Development) Art Center in Richmond, CA, since 1993. Mullen makes text-inspired paintings, referencing the graphic design of art magazines such as Artforum.

=== Solo exhibitions ===
Mullen has exhibited throughout the United States.

- The Museum of Modern Art, New York (2024)
- Massimo De Carlo (2021)
- Adams & Ollman (2020)
- JTT (2019)
- NIAD (2017)
- Adams & Ollman (2016)
- Jack Fischer Gallery (2016)
- JTT (2015)
- White Columns (2012)
- Atlanta Contemporary (2015)

=== Group exhibitions ===
- After Shelly Duvall '72 at Maccarone (2011)
- Create at Berkeley Art Museum & Pacific Film Archive (2011)
- Color and Form at Jack Fischer Gallery in San Francisco (2013)
- Under Another Name, organized by Thomas J. Lax at the Studio Museum in Harlem (2014)
- NADA Art Fair in Miami with White Columns (2014)
- Way Bay 2 at Berkeley Art Museum & Pacific Film Archive (2018)
- Whitney Biennial (2019) - curated by Rujeko Hockley and Jane Panetta
- SECA 2019 at The San Francisco Museum of Modern Art (2020)
- Image Power at The Frans Hals Museum (2020)
- Into The Brightness at The Oakland Museum (2023)

=== Awards ===
- Wynn Newhouse Award (2015)
- SFMOMA SECA Award (2019)

=== Public collections ===
- Museum of Modern Art - New York, NY
- Whitney Museum of American Art - New York, NY
- Berkeley Art Museum - Berkeley, CA
- Portland Art Museum - Portland, OR
- Institute of Contemporary Art, Miami - Miami, FL
- High Museum of Art - Atlanta, GA
- MADMusée - Belgium
- RISD Museum - Providence, RI
- San Francisco Museum of Modern Art -San Francisco, CA
- Studio Museum in Harlem - New York, NY
