= Art in the San Francisco Bay Area (book) =

1985 nonfiction book

Art in the San Francisco Bay Area, 1945-1980
- Author: Thomas Albright
- Illustrator: Various
- Subject: Art history, the San Francisco Bay Area
- Publisher: University of California Press
- Publication date: 1985
- Media type: Hardcover
- ISBN: 978-0520051935

Art in the San Francisco Bay Area, 1945-1980: An Illustrated History is a 1985 nonfiction book by art critic Thomas Albright, about the modern history of art in the San Francisco Bay Area. It was published by the University of California Press.

== Subjects ==
Albright covers the movements in modern art in which the Bay Area were heavily involved, and their practitioners, including Clyfford Still and Abstract Expressionism, the Modernist school, Pop Art, Formalism, The Bay Area Figurative Movement, Conceptual art, Photorealism, and others. The book contains numerous reproductions of the works discussed.

== See also ==
- Art in the San Francisco Bay Area, article covering the subject, beyond the modern period
