= St. Joseph's Church and Complex =

Historic church in California, United States

- U.S. National Register of Historic Places
- San Francisco Designated Landmark
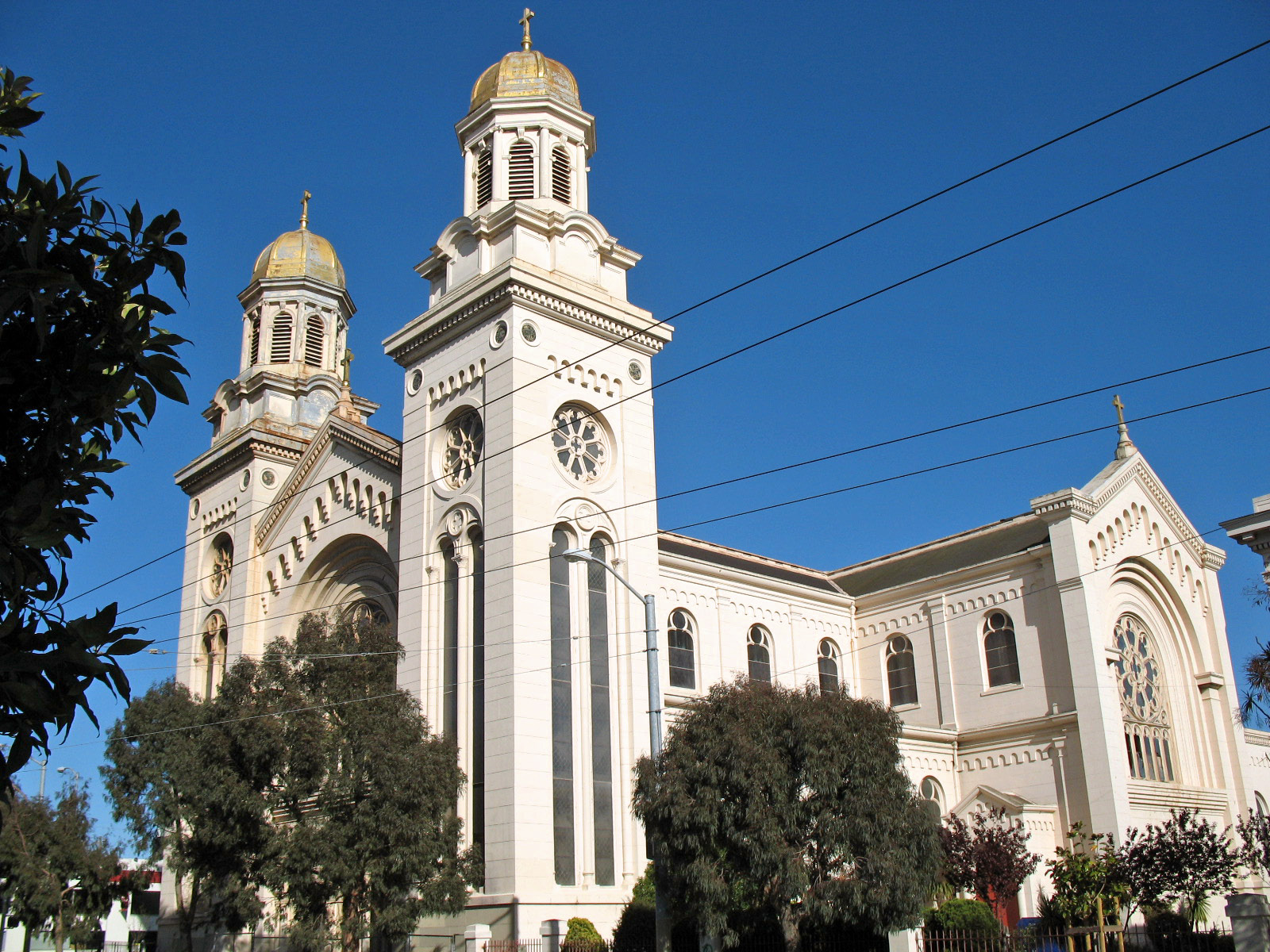

- Location within San Francisco County Location within California Location within the United States
- Location: 1401–1415 Howard St., San Francisco, California
- Coordinates: 37°46′25″N 122°24′47″W
- Area: 1.4 acres (0.57 ha)
- Built: 1914
- Architects: Foley, John J.
- Architectural style: Romanesque
- NRHP reference No.: 82002250
- SFDL No.: 120

Significant dates
- Added to NRHP: January 15, 1982
- Designated SFDL: October 5, 1980

St. Joseph's Church and Complex is a historic church built in 1906, and located at 1401–1415 Howard Street in the South of Market neighborhood of San Francisco, California, United States.

It was added to the National Register of Historic Places on January 15, 1982; and added to the list of San Francisco Designated Landmarks on October 5, 1980.

== History ==
The Romanesque Revival structure was built in 1906 and designed by architect John J. Foley; it once served as both the Catholic church and a school. Most of the parishioners at the time of founding were Irish, and by 1979, most of the parishioners were Filipino. The building was damaged after the 1989 Loma Prieta earthquake.

In 2018, the 22,000-square-foot building was renovated and re-imaged as the Saint Joseph's Arts Society run by the Saint Joseph's Arts Foundation, a nonprofit 501(c)(3) subscriber-based arts center led by Ken Fulk.
