= Disability in American slavery =

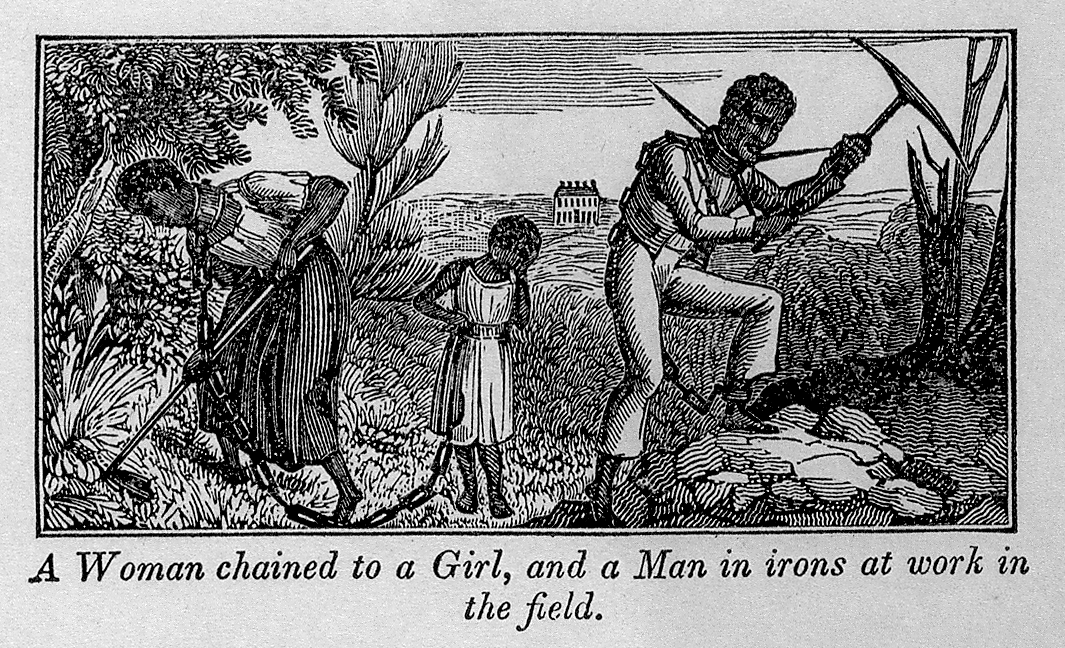

It is estimated that about 9 percent of American slaves were disabled on the eve of the Emancipation Proclamation due to some type of physical, sensory, psychological, neurological, or developmental condition. This means that roughly 360,000 to 540,000 American slaves had a disability. In the antebellum age, slaves were described as disabled if their injury or condition prevented them from performing labor, such as blindness, deafness, loss of limbs, and even infertility. Since disabled slaves could not fend for themselves or perform the normal types of slave labor, they usually depended on their masters and mothers to take care of them. In terms of labor, disabled slaves usually found themselves working in the kitchen or in nurseries. Since they could not work as fast as non-disabled slaves, disabled slaves were often subject to harsh treatment that included weapons. Often, slave owners would sell off their disabled slaves to doctors who would then perform medical experiments on them. After slavery ended, disabled slaves mostly remained on plantations until the government was able to set up hospitals and asylums to house them.

== Definition of disability in slaves ==
In the antebellum South, the term "disabled" did not just apply to African American slaves who had been born with a mental or physical disability. Rather, slaveholders usually referred to slaves who had been subject to lack of food, harsh penalties, harmful work conditions, or abuse as mentally or physically disabled. Slaveholders developed the idea of soundness; a slave's soundness depended upon their ability to perform manual labor, their value as a commodity, and lastly their actual health. Because of this, the term disability described many enslaved African Americans because of the multitude of injuries that left them unable to perform manual labor. These "injuries" included diseases, such as rickets, pellagra, and scurvy, which caused sight impairment and stunted growth. Injuries such as fractures, burns, loss of limbs, or head trauma left slaves unable to perform their manual labor which thus labelled them disabled. One of the most common forms of disability was blindness which could have been caused by birth defects, grueling days in the field, or severe beatings or whippings where the eyes were harmed. Infertility, or inability to reproduce, categorized women as disabled as they were unable to perform their most important duty. Along with these disabilities, psychological impairments, neurological problems like epilepsy, old age, and injuries from abuses such as whippings led to slaves being labelled as disabled.

== Life and labor ==
During childhood, disabled slaves challenged not only slave owners but also their own mothers. Doctors and mothers spent more time providing medical care or attending to their disabled children. Children were often sent away to doctors who performed surgeries to correct their disabilities; owners hoped that the disabled slaves would be restored to working capability. Many disabled children were subject to surgeries that attempted to fix conditions such as "clubbed feet" and blindness. When owners did not pay medical attention to child slaves with disabilities, the role of caretaker fell to their mothers. Along with taking care of disabled children, mothers had to take care of their other children, deal with their declining health caused by age and living conditions, as well as perform their work duties on the plantation. Mothers advocated for their children and often put their disabled child's needs ahead of their duties on the plantation which often resulted in punishment. Despite the struggles that went along with raising a disabled child on a plantation, mothers did not have as much fear of their child being sold or taken away. Sometimes, slaveholding families would even buy disabled children along with their enslaved mothers because they felt pity for the disabled children.

Slaves with disabilities were subjected to most of the same labor and punishments as other slaves. In terms of labor, slaves with disabilities were involved with cooking, sewing, gardening, and taking care of the children and livestock. Although their tasks were generally limited, it did not mean that their jobs were easier. When it came to cooking, disabled slaves did not avoid hard work as they were expected to wake up before their master and other slaves to cook meals; cooking meals often included the strenuous tasks of grinding meat and gathering wood for fires. Similarly, disabled slaves who worked in the nursery had to deal with little children throughout the day; this was usually too much for old, disabled slaves who were given that job. Despite these more common jobs and tasks, disabled slaves were sometimes given very odd tasks. For example, a blind slave was in charge of driving the breakfast cart out to the fields to feed the other slaves. Some slave owners sold their disabled slaves off to be tradesmen such as tailors or shoemakers. Most slaves regarded tradesmen's lifestyles to be safer than the average plantation slave's lifestyle.

== Treatment ==
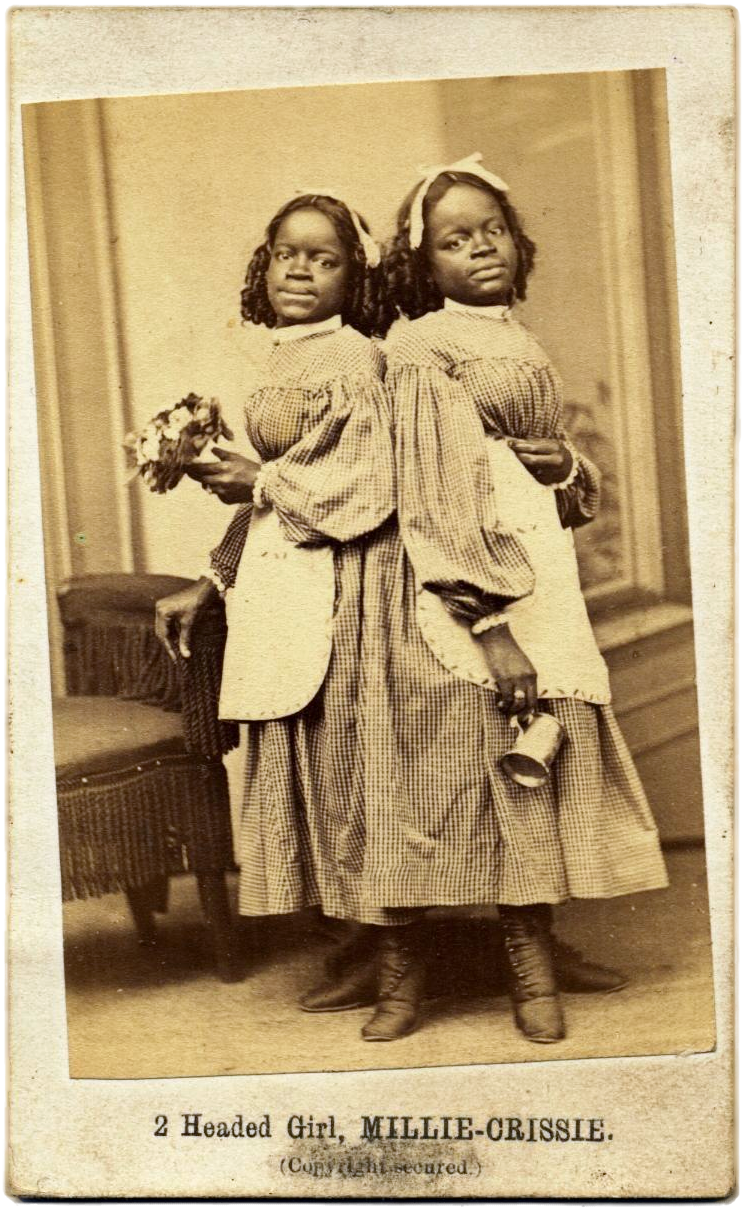
Christine and Millie McKoy

Often, disabled African American slaves were subject to punishments due to their inability to perform tasks. Usually hindered by physical or mental limitations, disabled slaves were incapable of working as fast as other slaves and struggled with the heavy workloads that accompanied slaves that worked in the fields. Not surprisingly, disabled slaves were subject to corporal punishment such as whippings. More commonly, slaves with disabilities were neglected rather than punished. Slave owners dealt with older disabled slaves in multiple ways. Slave owners would make sure that older disabled slaves would receive reduced rations. Sometimes, slave owners would just sell the disabled slaves. When disabled slaves became "too old", slave owners would often force the slaves to move to cabins or rooms out in the middle of the woods and forced them to fend for themselves.

Slave owners often sold away slaves with disabilities to doctors who were performing medical research. Doctors attempted new techniques as well as therapeutic interventions on these disabled slaves; the hope was that these doctors would be able to "fix" the slaves' disabilities which would allow them to help white people with similar disabilities. Along with general medical research, slaves with disabilities were used as subjects of surgical demonstrations. For example, Georgia physician Crawford Long discovered that sulfuric ether could be used as anesthesia by performing surgeries on disabled African American slaves that included the amputations of their fingers and toes. Similar to medical research, Long, and other doctors who experimented with disabled slaves, believed that their findings could be used to help white people with the same ailments. White doctors also studied African American slaves born with congenital birth defects.

An example of disabled slaves who were subjected to harsh treatment were Christine-Millie McKoy, twins that were born conjoined at the hip. Before they were two years old, they were sold to a Joseph P. Smith who showcased the girls in carnivals and other events while also allowing them to be evaluated by doctors. Medical officials were obsessed with the twins' reproductive organs and anuses which led to their "digital rape." Throughout their life, the McKoy twins would be showcased all across the United States as well as Europe, kidnapped multiple times, and medically mishandled by medical professionals.

== Civil War and aftermath ==
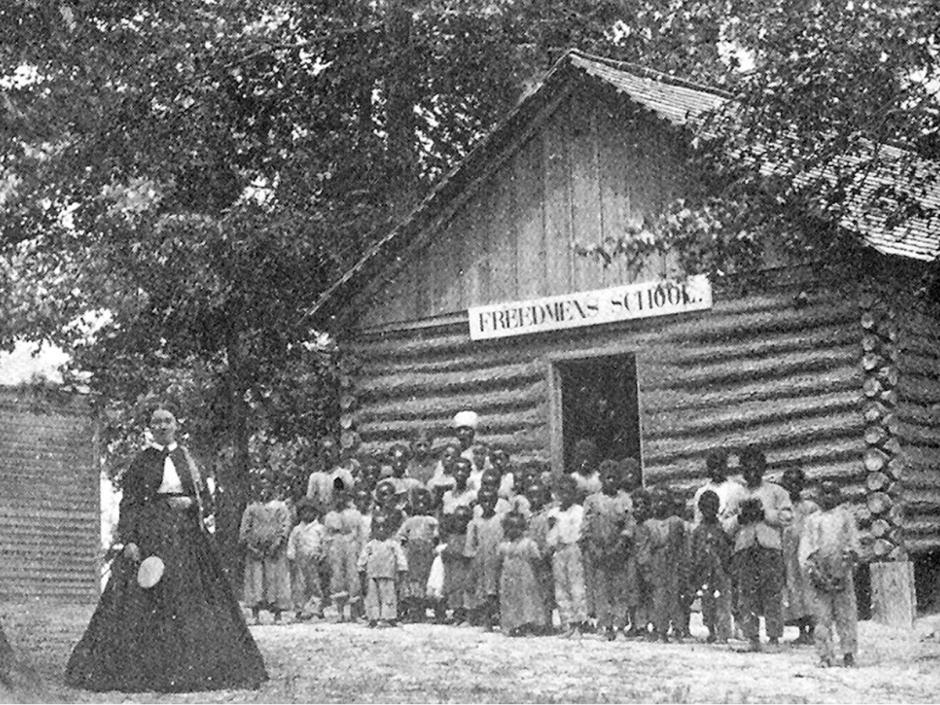
Along with schools such as these, the Freedmen's Bureau helped with the building of hospitals and asylums for African Americans.

During the Civil War, African American slaves, when hearing about Union advancement, abandoned their homes on the plantation to join the Union Army. However, the Union army sought out able-bodied slaves who could help dig ditches, launder uniforms, and cook meals. Therefore, disabled slaves who were unable to flee from their plantations were forced to stay enslaved. Even after the Civil War ended, disabled freed slaves who were unable to enter the workforce were forced to stay on their plantations and work for their masters. The government decided to focus some of their relief efforts towards those with disabilities which can be seen through Secretary of War E.M. Stanton's comments: "Under any circumstances, and in all large societies, even during a normal and peaceful condition of things, there will be found a certain amount of vagrancy and a certain number of indigent poor, disabled, or improvident, to whom it is a custom and a duty to extend relief." In March 1865, the US government established the Freedmen's Bureau to help freed African Americans, including disabled former slaves, adjust to freedom and what it entailed. The Freedmen's Bureau helped the government in terms of disabled persons in two ways: counting the number of disabled people in the South to estimate the amount of fiscal relief needed and setting up asylums and hospitals for disabled former slaves to reside in. In terms of their first responsibility, from "September 1, 1866 to September 1, 1867, the offices of the Bureau reported 1400 'blind' freed men, 414 'deaf and dumb',1,134 'idiotic or imbecile', 552 'insane', and 251 'club footed.'" However, these numbers represent the amount of former disabled slaves the Bureau actually saw when in reality, many more disabled slaves were still hung up in their plantations where the Freedmen's Bureau could never have found them. Secondly, due to the South's refusal to allow African American disabled people into the same asylums as white people, the Freedmen's Bureau set up asylums across the South. However, many times these asylums did not have enough funding so the Bureau was forced to have disabled African Americans perform tasks to help ends meet. For example, the Bureau had disabled African Americans work in vegetable gardens, clean laundry, and even join in the construction of facilities.

== See also ==
- Disability in the United States
