= The Laundry SF =

Art gallery in San Francisco, California, U.S.

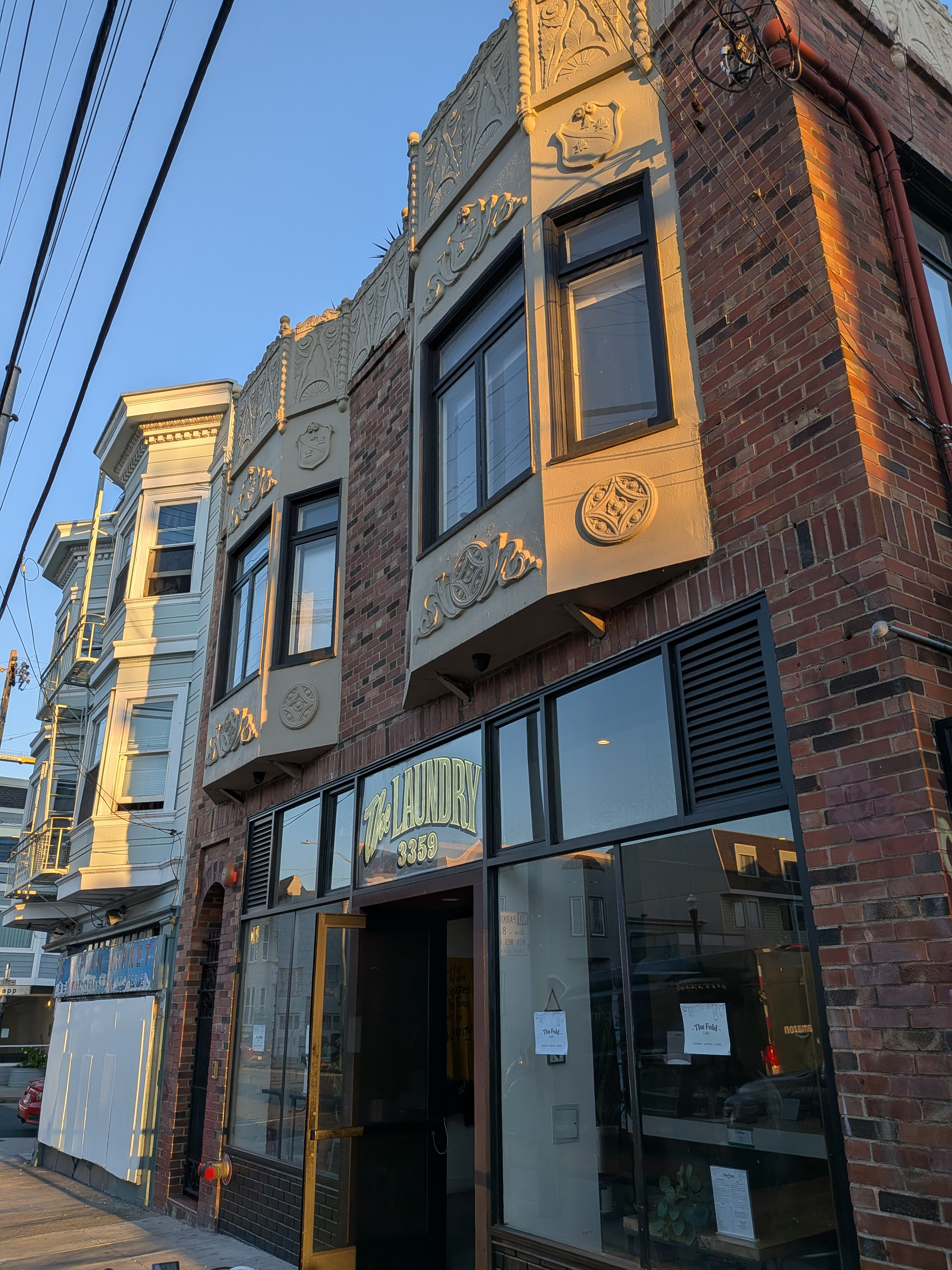
- Exterior of the Laundry SF
- Formation: 2015 (age 10–11)
- Founder: Sara Ahmadian, Andrew Swerdlow, Gianmatteo Costanza, Dan Fredinburg
- Location(s): 3359 26th Street, San Francisco, California
- Coordinates: 37°44′57″N 122°25′02.5″W
- Website: www.thelaundrysf.com

The Laundry SF, or simply The Laundry, is a contemporary art gallery, event space and cafe, founded in 2015 and located in San Francisco’s Mission District. The Laundry curates exhibitions, which includes public programming around civics, fine arts, music, comedy, and live performances. The Laundry hosts a mix of works by emerging and established Bay Area and global artists.

== History ==
It was founded in the year 2015 by Sara Ahmadian, Andrew Swerdlow, Gianmatteo Costanza and Dan Fredinburg. The name of the gallery was due to the historic nature of the building they occupy. The building was erected in the year 1932, where a French family procured the place during 1940's and opened a French laundry service, being first within the community.

The gallery is also known for its partnership with the restaurant Koomaj Kitchen, for bringing traditional Northern Iranian food to San Francisco. Several scenes from the Netflix documentary, The Social Dilemma were filmed at The Laundry.

== Artists ==
- Suzy Kellems Dominik
- Purin Phanichphant
- Adrien Segal
- Bruce Joel Rubin
- Anna Friz
- Dyanna Dimick
- Blanche Mallins Rubin
- Veronica DeJesus
- Lauren Tabak

== Exhibitions ==
- 2016 – Art of Dying, VR and AR group exhibition, curators were Lindsay Saunders and Kelly Vicars of Dream Logic.
- 2017 – I am an Immigrant, a pop-up exhibition and event.
- 2017 – Vanity ll,
- 2018 – Second Chance, was a VR-based a two-hour immersive experience for groups of ten people at a time.
- 2019 – Suzy Kellems Dominik and INVISIBLE, We the People, solo exhibition
- 2019 – Race, Identity and the New Great American Stories
