= Savernack Street =

Art Gallery in San Francisco

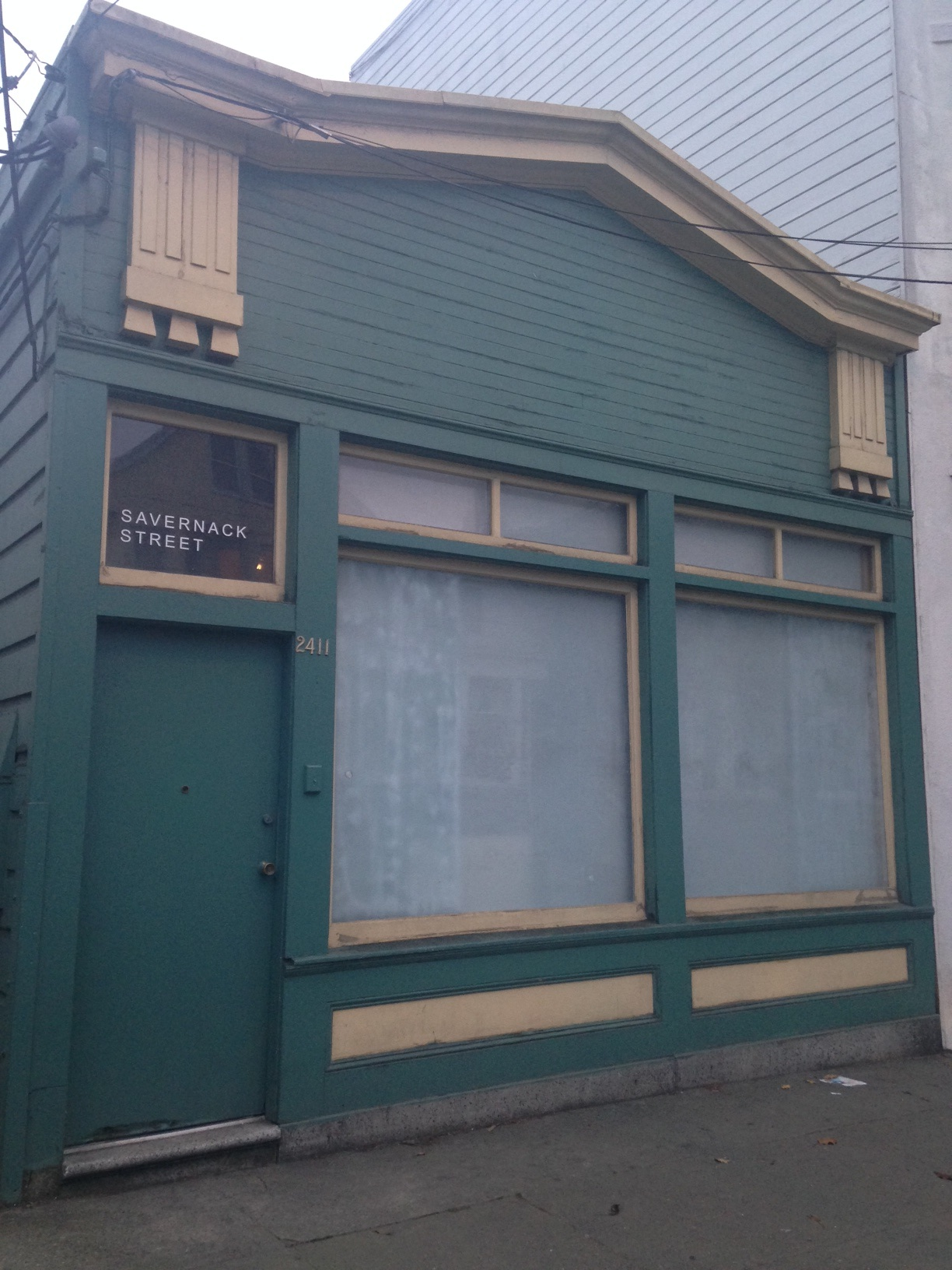
- Savernack Street in March 2015
- Founded: 2013
- Founder: Carrie Sinclair Katz
- Type: Independent Art Gallery
- Purpose: Peephole Art Exhibitions
- Location(s): 2411 24th Street; San Francisco, California
- Coordinates: 37.75306°N 122.40378°W
- Region served: San Francisco, Bay Area
- Website: savernackstreet.com

Savernack Street Gallery (2013–2016) was a small art gallery in the Mission District of San Francisco; founded in 2013 by artist Carrie Sinclair Katz. The gallery interior was inaccessible and visitors can only view artwork by looking through a reverse peephole located on the storefront. The monthly exhibitions at Savernack Street usually featured a single piece of artwork that appears larger or life size when viewed through the peephole. The name Savernack comes from a road in London, and is not an actual street in San Francisco.

== History ==
Savernack Street Gallery was founded in 2013 by artist Carrie Sinclair Katz shortly after receiving her MFA degree from the San Francisco Art Institute. The artist said her motivation was to comment on the difficulties an emerging artist faces when trying to crack into the art world and that the small size of the gallery and its limited access was “[..] a practical issue about how much square footage in San Francisco costs right now” and was all she could afford. In May 2015, Katz also stated a motivation for Savernack Street Gallery "[...]was trying to play with expectations and make people question why they had certain expectations [of an art viewing experience]”.

In June 2014, Katz was awarded an Alternative Exposure grant by Southern Exposure to support continued exhibitions at Savernack Street. The funding for Southern Exposure's Alternative Exposure award is provided by the Andy Warhol Foundation.

Exhibitors have included artists j.Frede, Jo Babcock, Juan Fontanive, Peggy Ingalls, and Lee Hunter.

Other Savernack Street projects: Founded in Spring 2014, Station Gallery is an art gallery curated by Carrie Sinclair Katz inside her 1940's wristwatch.
