= Marin Society of Artists =

Art nonprofit in San Rafael, California

- Formation: 1927; 99 years ago
- Founded at: Novato, Marin County, California, U.S.
- Type: Arts nonprofit
- Headquarters: 1515 3rd Street, San Rafael, Marin County, California, U.S.
- Website: www.marinsocietyofartists.org
- Formerly called: Marin Art Association, Marin Arts and Garden Center

The Marin Society of Artists (MSA) is an arts nonprofit 501(c)(3) organization founded in 1927, and located at 1515 3rd Street in San Rafael, California. It is the first and the oldest art organization in Marin County. Formerly known as the Marin Art Association, and formerly part of the Marin Arts and Garden Center.

== History ==
Starting around 1927, a group of around 50 artists, primarily from San Francisco, who would travel on the weekends to Marin County. They came together to form the "Marin Art Association", one of which was William Rauschnabel. In 1935, the name was changed to the Marin Society of Artists.

In 1944, the Marin Society of Artists joined together with seven other local organizations to purchased 11 acres of land from the former Kittle Estate at 30 Sir Francis Drake Blvd. in Ross, California. The groups incorporated the following year for loan purposes, under the name Marin Arts and Garden Center (MAGC). Eventually only three organizations remained on the land including the MSA, the Ross Valley Players, and the Marin Garden Society.

In 2015, membership was around 200 people. With the rising cost of rents in 2015, MSA decided to leave the Marin Arts and Garden Center in Ross and move to its present location in San Rafael.
