= Juan Fontanive =

American contemporary artist

Juan Fontanive (born 1977, in Cleveland) is a contemporary artist based in New York City.

== Education ==
Juan Fontanive studied at The Royal College of Art, London, 2003–2006 and at Syracuse University, 1995–1999.

== Career ==
In 2006 he debuted a series of his animated flip book machines in a solo show entitled "Paper Films" at Riflemaker Gallery, London. His work was part of the Indica show in London and New York in 2006 and 2007. His show Ornthology has been shown at Savernack Street in San Francisco in 2014.

Juan Fontanive is represented by Riflemaker in London, and Carbono Galeria in São Paulo.
