= Saint Joseph's Arts Society =

Arts nonprofit and organization in San Francisco

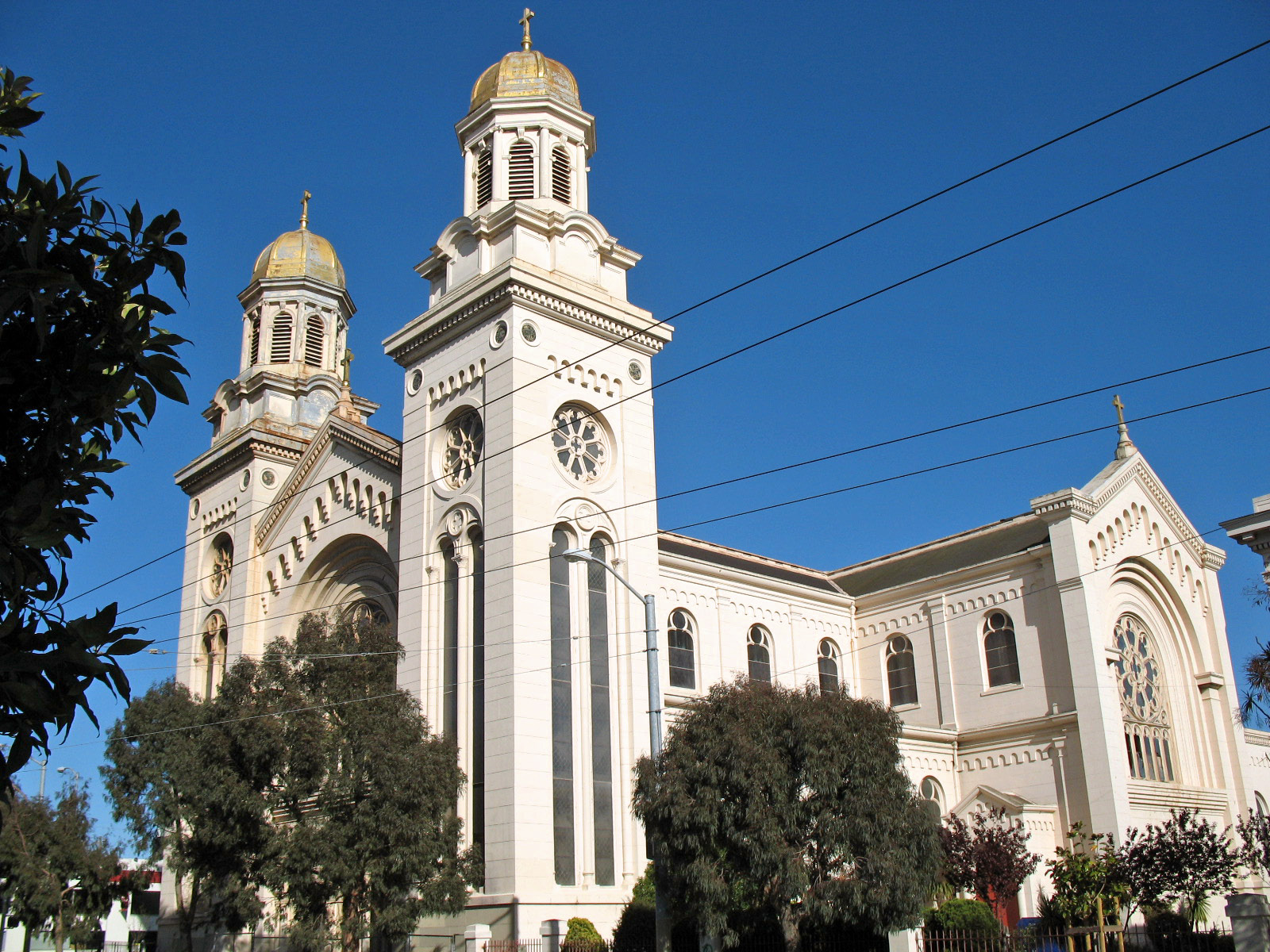
- Named after: St. Joseph's Art Foundation
- Founder: Ken Fulk
- Type: Arts nonprofit
- Headquarters: St. Joseph's Church, 1401 Howard Street, San Francisco, California, U.S.
- Coordinates: 37.7736°N 122.4143°W
- Website: Official website

Saint Joseph's Arts Society, run by the Saint Joseph's Arts Foundation, is an arts nonprofit 501(c)(3) organization and arts community located at 1401 Howard Street in the South of Market neighborhood of San Francisco, California.

== History ==
The Saint Joseph's Arts Society is largely subscription-based and was founded in 2018 by interior designer Ken Fulk. The organization is located in the restored, historic St. Joseph's Church, which is Romanesque in style and 22,000-square-feet. The building had seismic damaged after the 1989 San Francisco earthquake, and Fulk renovated the building.

The Saint Joseph's Arts Society works in collaboration with other arts nonprofits, and serves in many capacities including as a gallery, museum, event space, and an artist-in-residence space. It houses a branch of Carpenters Workshop Gallery. In 2021, Saint Joseph's Arts Society hosted Litquake, San Francisco's annual literary festival.
