= Creativity Explored =

Nonprofit in San Francisco, California

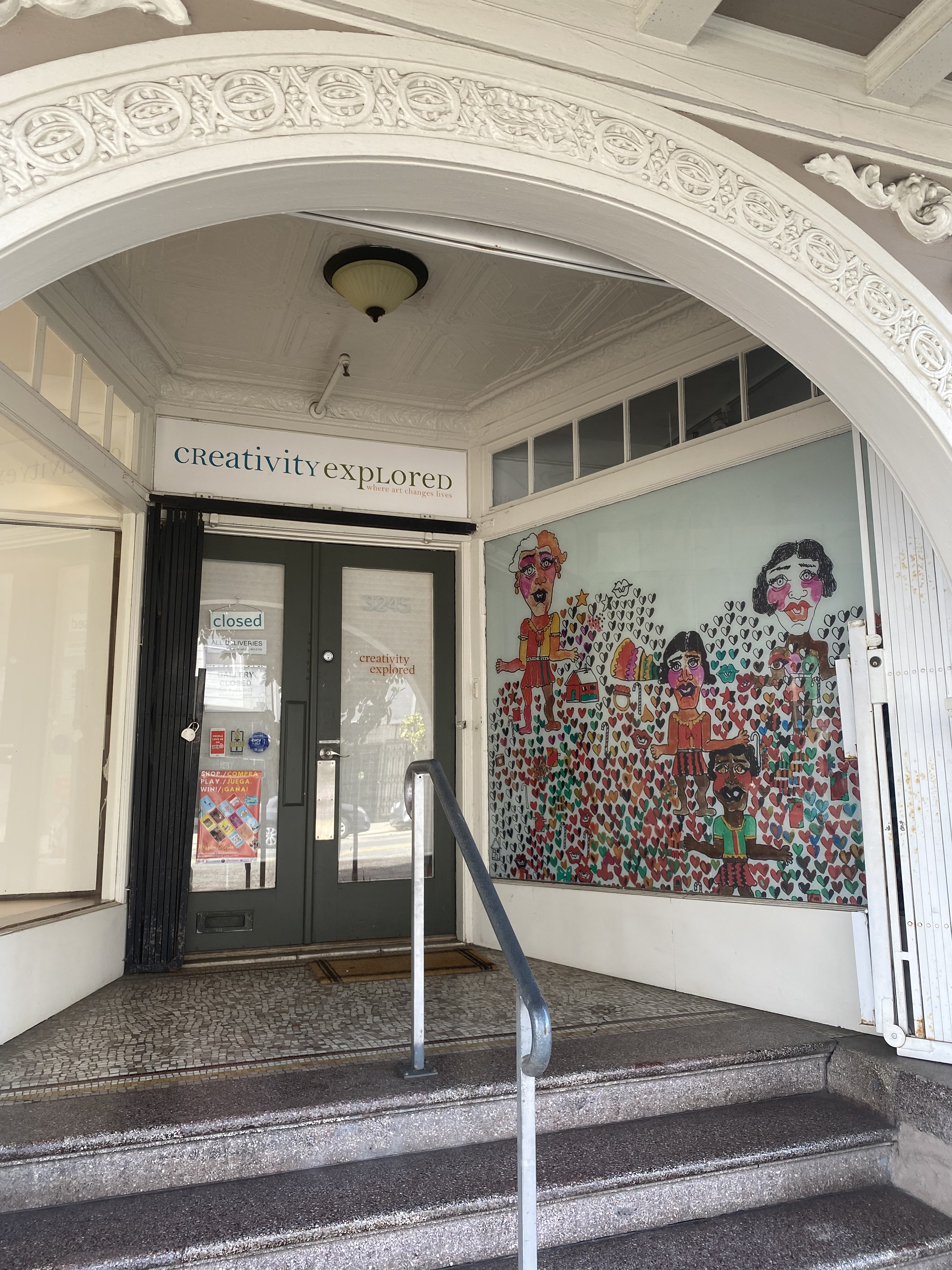
- CE in 2023
- Formation: 1983
- Founders: Florence Ludins and Elias Katz
- Type: Nonprofit
- Location: Studio 1: 3245 16th St, San Francisco, CA Studio 2: 1 Arkansas St, # E, San Francisco, CA
- Website: www.creativityexplored.org

Creativity Explored (CE) is a nonprofit organization in San Francisco that hosts a day program for developmentally disabled adult artists. Located in the Mission District and Potrero Hill, CE functions as a studio-based collective, offering, as of August 2023, over 130 artists art supplies, training, exhibition and sales opportunities. CE has a gallery in their Mission District location where they host shows and sell original artwork. The organization's motto is "Art Changes Lives". In 2018, the Legacy Business Program (of the City and County of San Francisco) recognized CE as a "San Francisco Legacy Business". In 2019, in the SF Bay Guardian’s Best of the Bay Awards, CE was awarded Best Nonprofit.

== Background ==
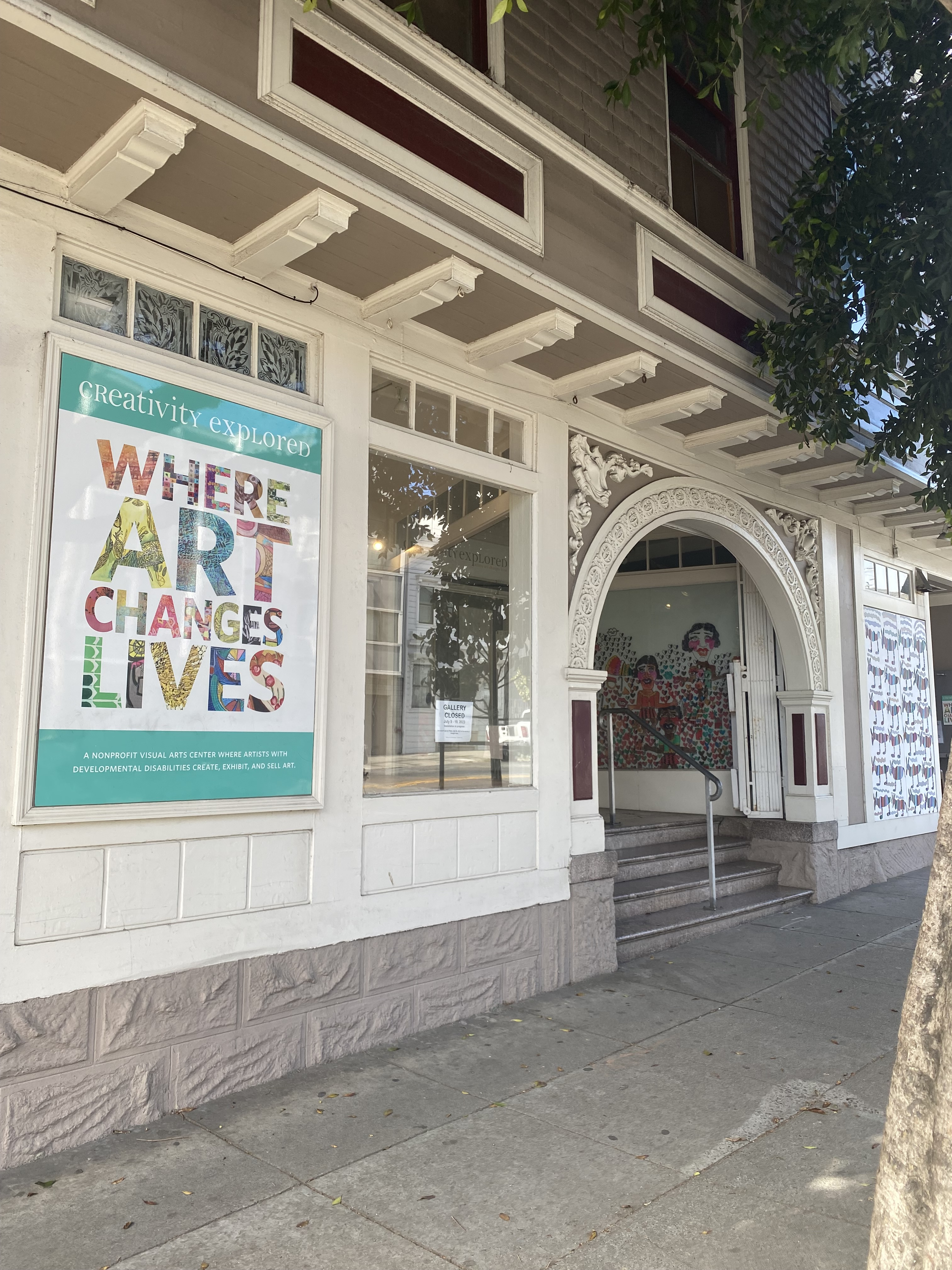
Creativity Explored in San Francisco's Mission District gallery front, 2023

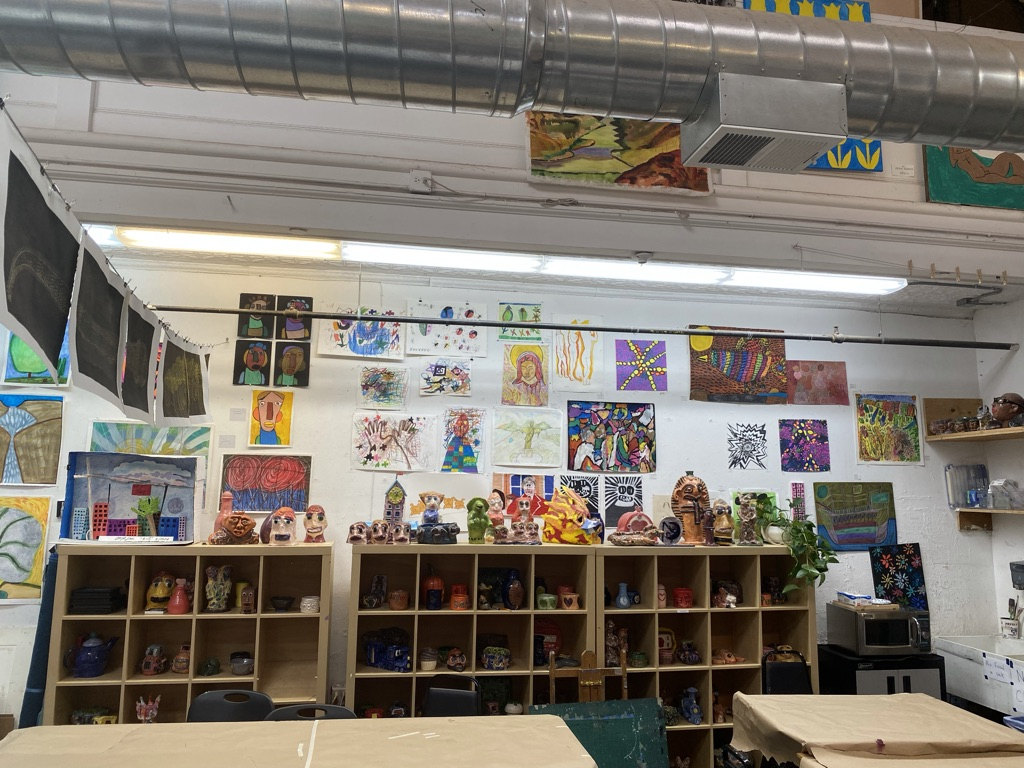
CE studio tables and storage/display area

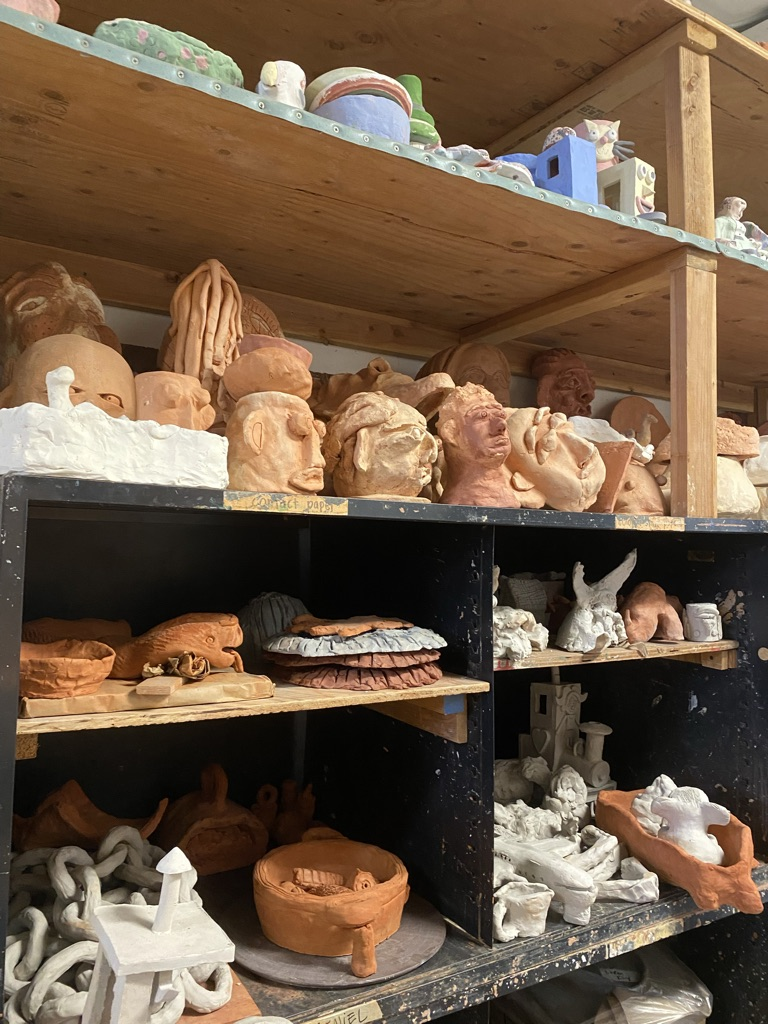
CE ceramic storage

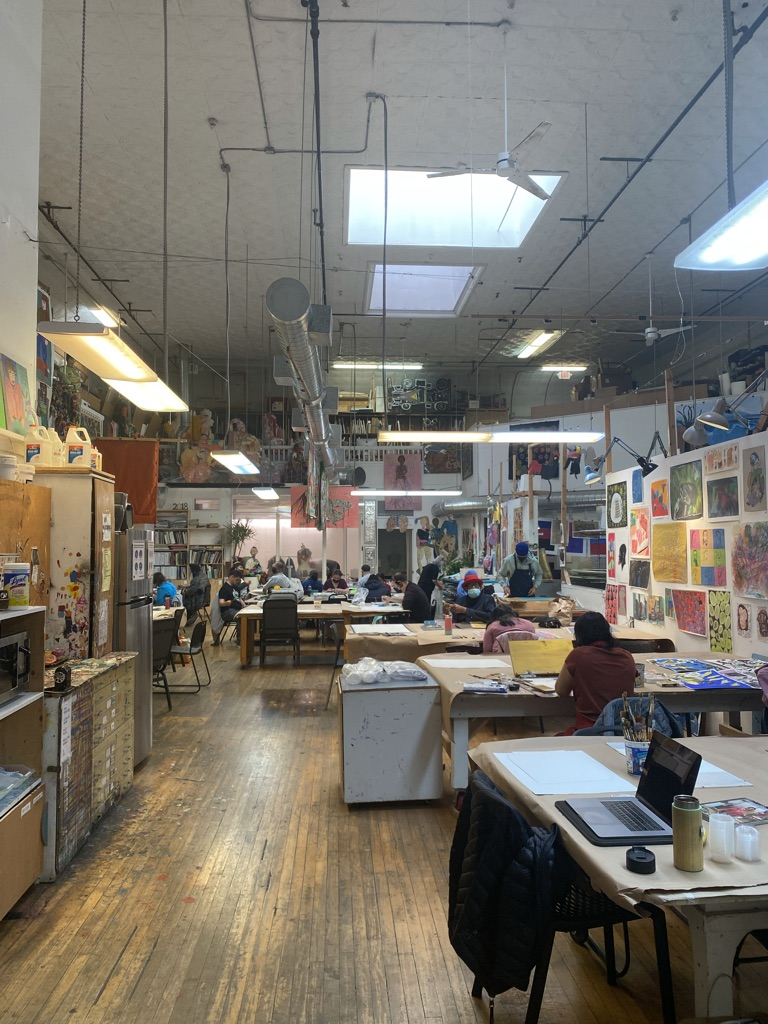
Studio during programming

Creativity Explored was founded in 1983 by artist Florence Ludins-Katz and psychologist Elias Katz who worked at the Sonoma Developmental Center. They also founded art center Creative Growth in Oakland, California, and NIAD (Nurturing Independence through Artistic Development) Art Center in Richmond, California. The three centers were intended to be independently operated although similar organizations in response to statewide cuts in services for disabled adults.

== Work ==
Creativity Explored is considered a progressive art studio, a fine arts studio where developmentally disabled adults can create art and community – this form of center differs from art therapy in that it is not a clinical practice. In a progressive art studio, a staff of teaching artists assist developmentally disabled artists through a variety of media, including oil pastels, painting, sculpture, digital media, textiles, printmaking, drawing, and collage.

Teachers at Creativity Explored assist artists with advice and art supplies on an individual basis; artists rotate through teachers, leaving uncompleted work with each teacher. Teachers at Creativity Explored generally have a background in fine arts, and often have individual studio practices. In 2020, Creativity Explored, along with Creative Growth and NIAD, switched its programs over to online art sessions due to the COVID-19 pandemic. The nonprofit hosts an annual gala, "Art Changes Lives", featuring a live and silent auction.

Creativity Explored has a gallery in its 16th Street location in the Mission District, where art is sold and exhibitions are curated, roughly five times a year. Creativity Explored artists have exhibited work in museums, galleries, and art fairs in over 14 countries and have earned over $2.2 million from their art. Creativity Explored also sells artwork online, both via its own website and art brokerage Artsy. The nonprofit also maintains a digital archive that is used for licensing projects.

Artists can also earn income through partnerships and grants that Creativity Explored manages on their behalf. Artists participating in the organization earn 50% of revenue generated by their artwork.

== Collaborations ==
=== Museum and gallery shows ===
- Oakland Museum of California: Beginning in May 2023 and on view through January 21, 2024, CE contributed art for Into the Brightness. This was the largest museum exhibition in over a decade featuring artists from the three Ludins-Katz-founded organizations. The show reflected disabled artists’ experiences of the world from their perspective.
- Recology: An exhibition on January 20, 21, and 24, 2023, at the Recology 503 Studio titled Become Like Life Golden: Creativity Explored at Recology displayed the work of 27 artists consisting of materials collected from the Recology Transfer Station. A condensed version was then displayed at the CE Gallery from January 26 to March 25, 2023, titled Relove: Creativity Explored at Recology.
- Museum of Craft and Design: From September 4, 2021, to January 23, 2022, the Museum of Craft and Design presented fashion designs by over 50 Creativity Explored artists in Mode Brut. The exhibition utilized recycled materials to reinforce a questioning of fashion. On display were textiles intended to propose shifting concepts of gender, accessibility, adaptive clothing, identity, and the role of the outsider in art.
- SFO Museum: From March 12 to December 4, 2016, in Terminal 3, Departures Level 2 of SFO, CE had an exhibit titled Celebrating a Vision: Art and Disability. This also included work from the sister organizations of Creative Growth and NIAD. Eight artists were chosen to represent their respective institutions, with work ranging from textiles to collage.
- Berkeley Art Museum & Pacific Film Archive: From May 11 to September 25, 2011, Create, a show displaying the work of CE artists, was on display at BAMPFA. It was curated by BAMPFA Director Lawrence Rinder, with Matthew Higgs, director of White Columns.

=== Published work ===
- Chronicle Books: In 2023, for the organization’s 40th anniversary, CE and Chronicle Books partnered to produce Art is Art: Collaborating with Neurodiverse Artists at Creativity Explored. The book includes hundreds of original artworks, ranging from paintings to sculptures, accompanied by quotes and stories from the artists themselves. It is organized into thematic chapters, including "Yes I Do Think About Sex", "Fears", and "Blackiful".
- Blackiful: June 2023, The Blackiful Collective and CE published Wonderful Blackiful People: Bay Area Changemakers from A to Z. Members include Adrianna Simeon, Alissa Bledsoe, Joseph "JD" Green, Joseph Omolayole, Laron Bickerstaff, and Vincent Jackson.

=== Partnerships ===
- San Francisco Public Library: From February to March 2023, more than 2,700 people voted for five CE artists' work to be turned into library cards. The voting took place online and in-person at the San Francisco Public Library Main Branch, where entries from 30 CE artists were displayed until April 30, 2023.
- Comme des Garçons: For the Autumn/Winter 2013–2014 show, founder Rei Kawakubo commissioned work by CE artist Dan Michiels. Kawakubo initially saw Michiel's work in Raw Vision, a magazine showcasing outsider art.
- Sakura of America: Sakura provides art supplies for CE. In their partnership with CE, Sakura posts interviews with CE artists to their website to highlight the use of their products in the studio.
- CB2: Beginning in 2008, CE and CB2 have collaborated on home goods, with CE's art first appearing on CB2 products in December of that year for an auction of six chairs, with 10% of sale proceeds going to CE.
