= Suzy Kellems Dominik =

American artist

- Born: 1961 (age 64–65)
- Occupation: Artist
- Website: https://www.suzykellemsdominik.com/

Suzy Kellems Dominik (born 1961) is an American multi-disciplinary artist known for exploring feminist themes. Her first major public art installation I Can Feel, exhibited during Art Basel Miami Beach 2017, is composed of a 12 feet (3.7 m) neon vagina sculpture and a brief choreographed light performance representing the female orgasm.

== Life and career ==
As a teenager, Kellems Dominik was a runner at the Junior Olympics level and a couple years later was named an All-American gymnast. She started to showcase her artwork when she was 50 years old, after being a stay-at-home mom for the past 20 years. She started her career as an artist in 2014. As of 2019, she lives and works between New York and Jackson, Wyoming.

Kellems Dominik is a board member of the Mark Morris Dance Group, and she has fund-raised for the group and hosted their performances. Her daughter Sophia Schneider has led Morris' youth dance group alongside Nicholas Ma.

== Selected works ==
=== I Can Feel ===
I Can Feel is a neon sculpture and choreographed light performance. Standing at 12 feet (3.7 m) tall, the 27.68-second neon performance represents the female orgasm. The work has been exhibited at the Nautilus Hotel during Art Basel Miami Beach in 2017. In 2019, I Can Feel made its New York debut at a Chashama gallery in Brooklyn Bridge Park, and it was organized in conjunction with an all-female panel discussion titled "Tracing Feminism".

=== Invisible ===
Invisible is an installation featuring five 11 feet (3.4 m) female sculpture totems of cotton-knit and wool. The sculpture is intended to pay homage to representations of the female body throughout art history. It was exhibited at the Nautilus Hotel during Art Basel Miami Beach in 2018, and with The Laundry SF (in San Francisco) in 2019 for the artist's solo exhibition "An Excavation".

=== Other work ===
San Francisco's Nob Hill Gazette in 2019 featured several works by Kellems Dominik, including:

- Beatrice — To Hell and Back, a 2015 installation
- Badassery, a poem series encompassing various mediums
- We the People – Stoned, a film exploring mob mentality.
