= Purin Phanichphant =

American contemporary artist

Purin Phanichphant (born 1984 in Crown Point, Indiana) is an American contemporary artist and designer who is known for his interactive installations. Phanichphant began his artistic career in product design in 2006 and then interactive art in 2014. Because of this unique background, his work combines buttons, knobs, screens, and a touch of code, which often result in interactive experiences for audiences. His work has been featured in museums, galleries and venues around the United States, Japan, and Iceland.

== Education ==
Phanichphant received a BFA in Industrial Design and Human-Computer Interaction from Carnegie Mellon University in 2006, and an MFA in Product Design from Stanford University in 2011.

== Teaching ==
Phanichphant has taught design courses on visual design and design thinking at UC Berkeley, Stanford University and General Assembly. Additionally, he has given talks at TEDxBangkok, Pecha Kucha Tokyo, Android Open Conference, and Web 2.0 Expo.
