= Disability treatments in the United States =

History of treatment for disability

Disability treatments have varied widely over time in the United States, and can vary widely between disabilities, and between individuals.

Throughout the Industrial Revolution many disabled people would still end up in asylums, especially if they were mentally disabled, as those were considered completely untreatable. Though during this time schools for the deaf and the blind would begin to open as people found ways to remedy physical disabilities. Eugenic movements during the late 1800s stalled treatment progress due to a "survival of the fittest" mindset taking place, going back to the same ideas held by the Romans and the Greeks.

During the 20th century, eugenic ideas began to fall out of fashion and progress towards understanding what caused disabilities was made. During this time the U.S. also expanded rehabilitation facilities and the independent living movement would begin, the independent living movement would advocate that rather than the person in question being considered a patient at the whims of an all-knowing doctor, the person would rather be considered a consumer, who is now instead presented with options instead of an option. Being informed of alternatives to choose what is best for them by themselves and ultimately in control of their welfare. The program advocates for ideas such as self-help and advocacy, peer counseling from others in a similar situation, and the removal of environmental obstacles and societal attitudes. This attitude would be considered radical during the mid-20th century when it was proposed, however over the decades and into the 21st century attitudes about this would also begin to change, leading to today where this is a much more normal thing and consumers are increasingly being consulted in their rehabilitation.

== 16th–17th centuries ==
In the Thirteen Colonies, people carried on the tradition of thinking that the disabled were witches, often being burned or hanged. Others viewed disabilities as God's disapproval of the colonists, and overall, people thought of disabled people as a disgrace to their families and communities. Once again holding on to the belief that disability was connected to God and administered as punishment. Disabled members of wealthy families were, if nonviolent, kept at home, if not they were sent to an asylum and treated as criminals.

Treatment progress would be made in the early United States upon the opening of the first colonial hospital in Philadelphia in 1752, though the quality of care was lacking. A second hospital would open in New York in 1791 and in addition, the first 3 medical schools in the United States would open between 1760 and 1780, training 3,000 doctors in the process.

== Industrial Revolution ==
During the Industrial Revolution, the changes in lives of those with disabilities changed due to urbanization and the growth of factories, more hospitals were built but due to the working conditions of factories requiring strong and able-bodied people, those with disabilities were often excluded from participating in factory work at all. The quality of life for disabled individuals continued to improve, with the first U.S. school for teaching the deaf opening in 1817 in Hartford, Connecticut. Though great progress was made in aiding those with physical disabilities, those afflicted with mental disabilities didn't fare as well, as many were still institutionalized with little to no treatment administered, as people during this period believed that mental disabilities couldn't be cured. However, thanks to the research of Dorothea Dix, light was shed on this mistreatment and more humane treatments would soon come into effect. During the industrial revolution, another school of thought started to form: eugenics. After Charles Darwin published his 1859 book "Origin of Species" a survival of the fittest type doctrine began to form, where people argued against any kind of welfare for not only the disabled but the poor should be forbidden to exterminate the "weaker" members of the human race, "saving" it as a result.

== 18th century ==
In 18th-century America, disabled individuals were frequently subject to similar marginalization as groups like criminals, which upheld the unfavorable public view of the developmentally as well as physically disabled. The 18th Century was a time of new understanding and philosophical curiosity of the disabled; and a shift of the public's common view of disability. This new approach paved the way for future medical treatments, scientific discovery, and new physiatric institutions which brought about beneficial as well as unethical medical treatment. These institutions of the developmentally disabled would continue to grow in popularity up to the present day, with many alterations and new understandings of how to treat disability. Before this period in time, the general public's opinion of Disability was often referred to as a "Time of confusion", reflecting the lack of understanding and scientific approaches to classifying and treating both mental and physical disabilities. Accurate classifications for Developmental disabilities at the time were limited, resulting in there being no distinction between what is considered to be mental illness in the 21st century and "intellectual disability" during the 18th century.

=== Mental and developmental disabilities ===
==== Institutions and asylums ====
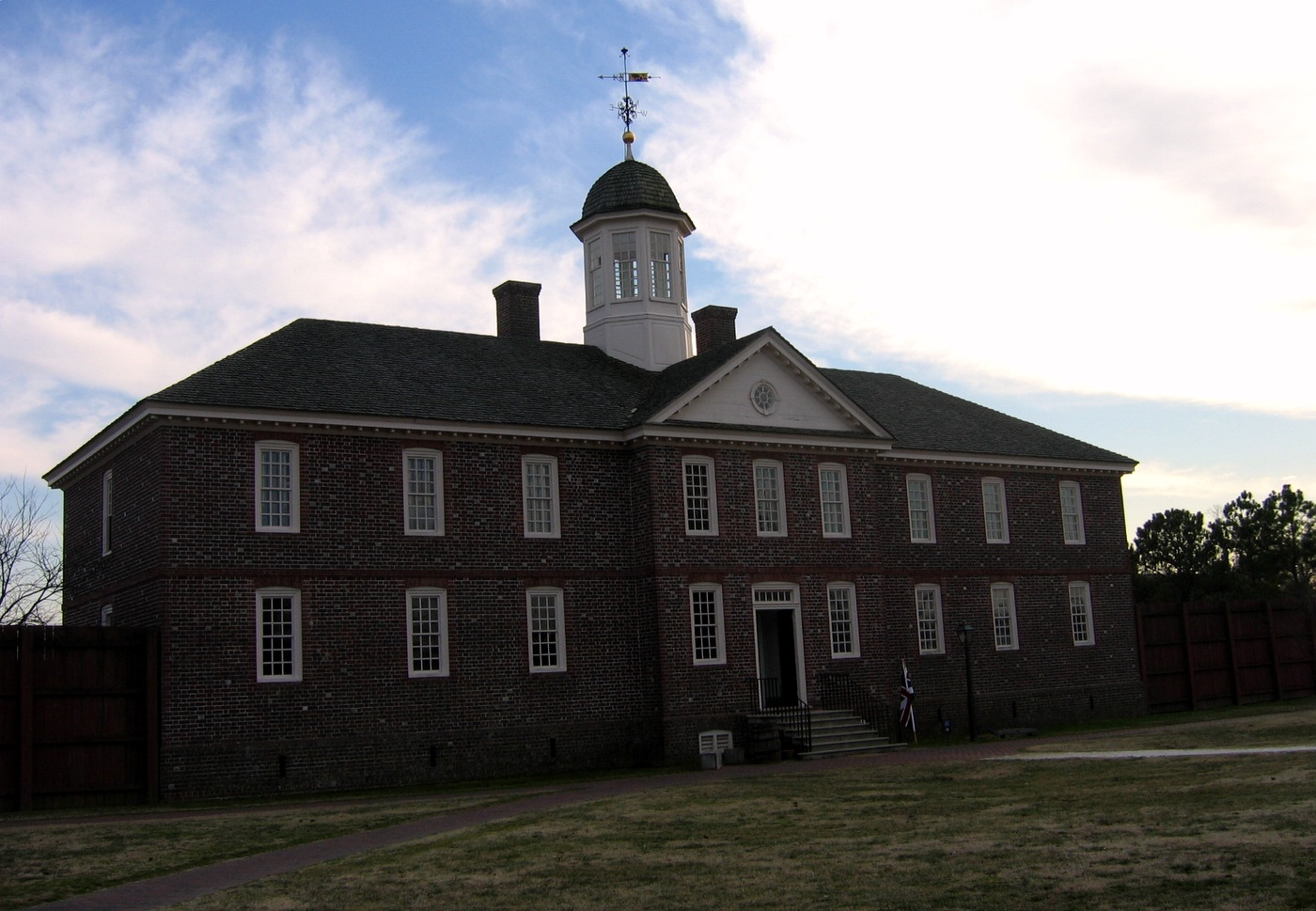
Eastern state hospital 1

In the period of Colonial America as well as the early Industrial Revolution, a new medical treatment for the "clinically insane" or "mentally retarded"; medical classifications that are not used in present-day psychiatry, emerged. During the 1760s–1780s, multiple medical schools were built; becoming the first medical schools in the United States. An increasing interest in medical treatments and medicine can be observed during this time. The Eastern State Hospital in Williamsburg, Virginia formed in 1773 was an example of this interest. This hospital is commemorated for being the First public Institution in the United States formed with the sole purpose of caring for the mentally disabled, and those facing what would be considered Mental illness in the Modern day. Before this hospital was built, institutions such as the Pennsylvania Hospital formed in 1751 by Dr. Thomas Bond and Benjamin Franklin, were further examples of psychiatric and medical progress in the United States. Most medical Institutions at the time for the "clinically insane" were lacking in proper medical care; reflecting the evolution of psychiatric care during the 18th century Terminology in the 18th and early 19th century

==== Hangings and persecution ====
Intellectually disabled people in the Early American Colonies were persecuted in most areas of life. The intellectually disabled who were born into wealthy families usually had a different experience in life than those who were not born into wealth, although it depended on their family's choices which affected their quality of life. For those born into wealth, most of the intellectually disabled or those with mental illness lived inside their homes almost exclusively. If a mentally ill or disabled person exhibited violent behaviors, they were generally treated the same way as criminals were, with imprisonment being a common punishment for this behavior. The average public opinion of disability at the time was that their mental challenges or disability was God's punishment, and disability was considered disgraceful if a family member exhibited such behaviors. Being burned or hung on a stake as "witches" had been in earlier times like the Salem witch trials in 1692, were common. In a similar fashion, exorcisms occurred mainly in the later centuries. Exorcisms which is the process of expelling demons from a person's body, became popular in later years. The lack of distinction between religious and scientific beliefs resulted in further persecution of disabled individuals.

==== Medical treatments ====
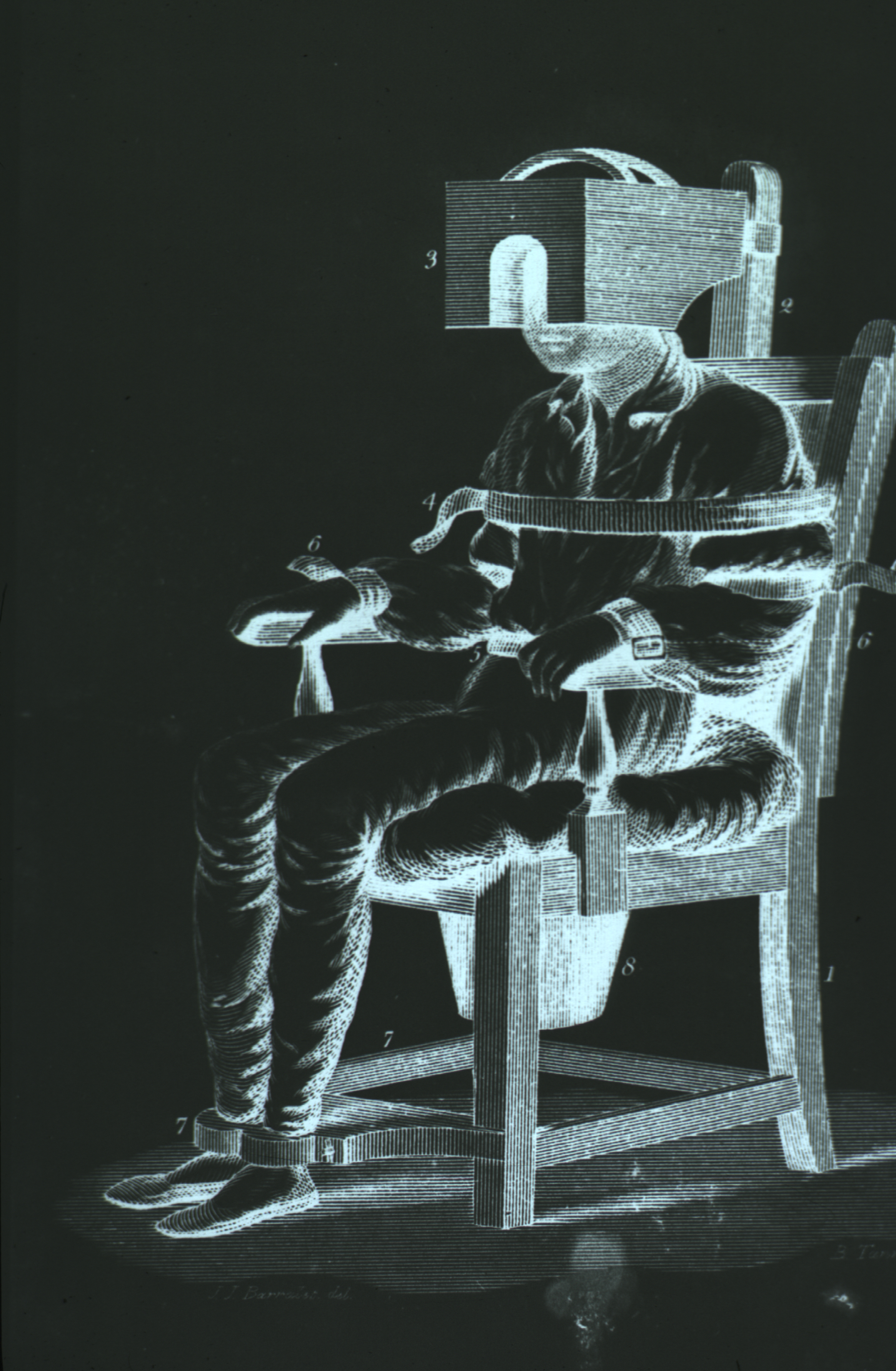
Tranquilizing Chair of Benjamin Rush

Although institutions for the mentally ill and intellectually disabled had started to gain popularity, continuing in the 19th century; there were also new innovative forms of treatment for those with disabilities during this time. Despite the medical innovation during the 18th century, a lot of medical professionals did not have adequate training; or were self-trained in their field of work. Because of this, medical procedures such as bloodletting, where a person was intentionally bled from a part of their body to cure illness or insanity, were common. Medical procedures such as bloodletting were typical in medieval Europe but were also evident in the 18th-century United States. The "Tranquilizing chair" invented by Dr. Benjamin Rush in the late 1700s was a new form of treatment for the "clinically insane." This chair was built to regulate blood circulation in the brain, which was believed to positively affect "insanity" levels in patients. Unlike previous scholars' beliefs that disability and demonic possession were connected, Dr. Benjamin Rush advocated for treating the intellectually disabled or mentally ill as disordered, rather than viewing the relationship through a superstitious and religious lens.

=== Physical disabilities ===
==== Injured workers ====
Beginning with the Industrial Revolution of 1760, the strenuous and long working hours resulted in many people becoming injured while working. Some of these injuries resulted in disability; or an inability in this case to effectively continue their job. Moreover, the majority of the now disabled "injured workers" were fired from their jobs. Workers compensation acts passed in the late 1900s provided compensation and assistance in returning to work if a person receives an injury at their place of employment. Without this act, newly disabled workers in the late 1700s to early 1800s did not receive any compensation for their employment-related injuries. In most cases, the employers would win if a lawsuit was filed because of the "contributory negligence" and "assumption of risk" laws that existed. These laws stated that a person was at fault for their injury because their negligence resulted in the injury, as well as that they knew the potential dangers of the working conditions.

==== Evolution of education ====
The American Enlightenment brought about new and innovative ideas regarding disability. Philosophers such as Jean Jacques Rousseau promoted the notion that children's education is most effective if they learn at their own pace, with minimal intervention. Along with these new ideas about education, was an emerging education for the deaf and blind. This trend would continue up until the present day, most notably in the 19th century with major educational reform for the deaf and blind. Although not much is known about education for the deaf and blind prior to the 1800s, instances of deaf and blind students learning to communicate through hand signs on their arms can be observed as early as the 15th century.

== 19th century ==
Attitudes toward disability in 19th-century America shifted due to a reclassification of criteria for a disability that began in Europe with Jean-Etienne Dominique Esquirol, as well as the effects of the Second Great Awakening, a Protestant religious revival that produced reforms on several fronts, which included the treatment of the disabled in America. Disability expanded in the public view in America during this time beyond its former visibility, leading to scrutiny of the treatment of the disabled and prompting the rise of "moral treatment," which involved more humane care and led to the rise of asylums.

=== Mental and developmental disabilities ===
The care of the disabled, typically taken on by poorhouses run by individual communities (which were often overcrowded and unhygienic) became the responsibility of the government starting in the early 1800s with the establishment of mental institutions. Although the first American asylum, the Eastern State Hospital, was founded in 1773, the popularization of institutions as treatments for mental disabilities rose in earnest in the mid-1800s along with the social reform brought by the Second Great Awakening.

==== Friends Asylum ====
Established in 1814 outside of Philadelphia by its Quaker community as the first privately run psychiatric hospital in the United States, the Friends Asylum was the first institution built specifically for the implementation of the program of moral treatment. It embodied this philosophy through its staff of volunteer citizens rather than limiting itself to medical professionals. The Friends Asylum's dedication to the philosophy of moral treatment was an influence on the culture of institutions for the mentally disabled throughout the 19th century, popularizing the idea of moral treatment in several other institutions of the time.

==== Kirkbride Plan ====
Many mental institutions during the mid-19th century followed the Kirkbride Plan, developed by Dr. Thomas Story Kirkbride. Kirkbride's hospital, the Institute of the Pennsylvania Hospital, was completed in 1859 and was constructed based on his philosophy about the treatment of the disabled. The plan served as a model for both the layout of the institutions and the treatments they should offer. Kirkbride's model includes a hospital that would house no more than 250 residents, with a main building with sprawling wings that contained lecture halls, classrooms, workshops and studios where residents could occupy their time. Kirkbride felt strongly that institutions should be located in serene, rural locations away from distressing environments and should be surrounded by gardens to further eliminate stress from the surroundings of the patients.

==== Blackwell's Island Asylum ====
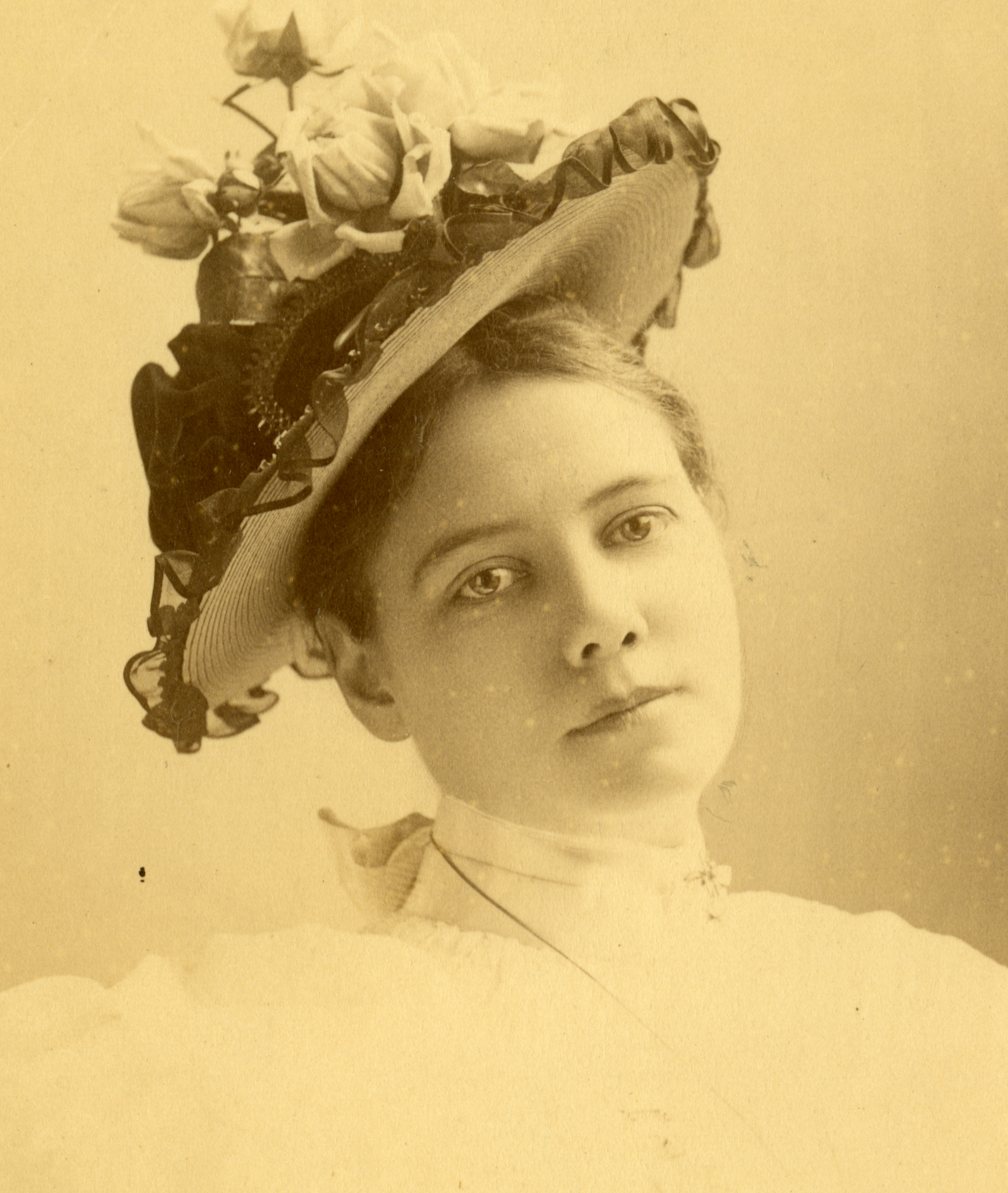
Elizabeth Cochrane (Nellie Bly)

Blackwell's Island, now Roosevelt Island in New York City, became home to the New York City Lunatic Asylum in 1839, after the island had operated a prison for seven years. The facility later received national attention due to the work of Nellie Bly (born Elizabeth Cochran Seaman), who committed herself to the women's ward in 1887 under the name Nellie Brown to expose the institution's inhumane conditions. Bly published her book, Ten Days in a Mad-House, in the same year, drawing severe scrutiny to Blackwell's Island due to Bly's description of her experience in unhygienic conditions, facing neglect and physical abuse at the hands of the nurses and medical professionals at Blackwell. Bly's work, in the decline of the Second Great Awakening's disability treatment reform movement, drew questions about the true state of treatment in the mental institutions across the United States that had become popularized since the early 1800s.

==== Willard Asylum of the Insane ====
Willard Asylum of the Insane was founded in 1869 in New York and closed in 1995. The institution housed many individuals with mental illnesses, epilepsy, intellectual disabilities, and cognitive delays, often for the rest of the person's life. While more negative reports exist of maltreatment of individuals, there is also documented interview evidence of the facility providing a caring environment through its healthcare professionals, supporting the notion that some benefit was derived for some patients while receiving care. The combination of identified neglect, abuse, and overall mistreatment of wards in state mental facilities, the push of deinstitutionalization, and the popularization of psychotropic medications, state mental wards such as Willard, began losing funding and shuttered.

=== Physical disabilities ===
==== Schools for the deaf and blind ====
The 19th century marked the spread of schools for the deaf and blind, as well as schools for children with other sensory issues or disabilities across the United States. These schools were often modeled after European systems, which included the Institution Nationale des Sourds-Moutes, a school for deaf children in Paris. In 1817, the Connecticut Asylum for the Education and Instruction of Deaf and Dumb Persons, which later became the American School for the Deaf, was founded by Dr. Mason Fitch Cogswell, Laurent Clerc, and Reverend Thomas H. Gallaudet, who had studied European teaching methods to instruct the blind and deaf. The formation of these schools for the blind and deaf in the 19th century shifted the public view of physical and sensory disabilities and implemented the first educational methods for children with disabilities that would form the foundation for the education of physically disabled children in the United States in the future.

=== Civil War ===
==== Amputations ====
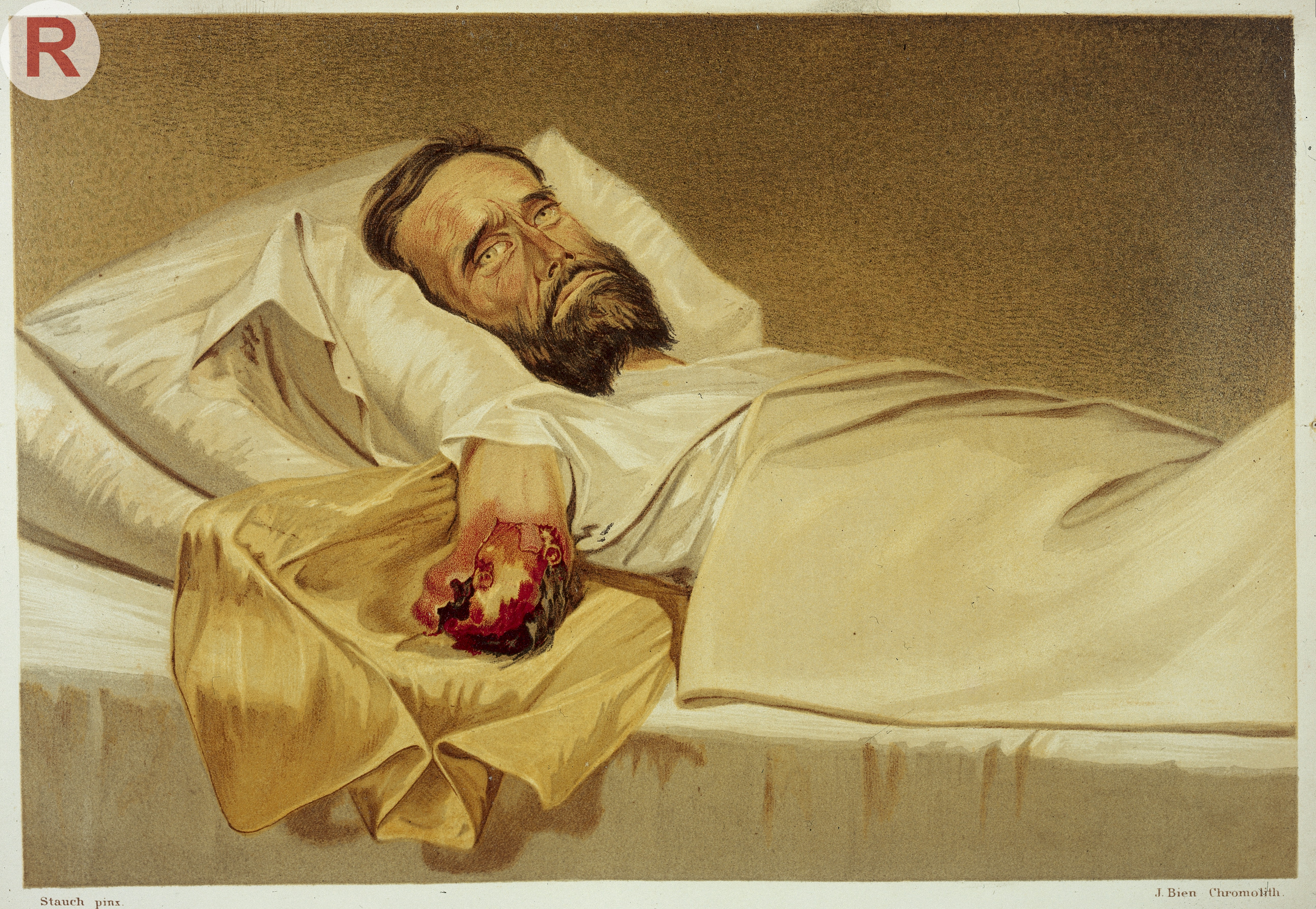
GANGRENE; Hospital gangrene of an arm stump Wellcome L0032206

The Civil War had a profound effect on the treatment of disability in the United States. Injuries sustained in battle required some 60,000 amputations to be performed on soldiers; amputations represented three-quarters of all surgical operations during wartime. By the war's end, the United States was home to more amputees than at any other time in its history, requiring an expansion of industry and society to accommodate veterans. James Edward Hanger, a Confederate soldier who lost his leg in battle, invented the first modern prosthetic, and his innovation led to the birth of the prosthetic industry. During the war, Union veterans were allowed $50 to purchase artificial arms and $75 to purchase artificial legs by the federal government in response to the amputation crisis, and later, in 1874, the Confederacy began making similar allowances for its own soldiers.

==== Effects of war on mental disabilities ====
In addition to physical disability, the Civil War's impact on the mental state of soldiers resulted in a nationwide increase in post-traumatic disorders and responses. Although medical professionals at the time were unable to link symptoms of post-traumatic stress disorder (PTSD), which was first published in the American Psychological Association's diagnostic manual in 1980, to the behavior of soldiers who fought in the Civil War, medical professionals today have noted the connection. Civil War veterans commonly experienced suicidal thoughts, which led over half of the residents of the Indiana Civil War veterans' home to take their lives, according to a study done by Eric T. Dean Jr. Civil War veterans were also common victims of paranoia and suffered from bouts of anxiety and violence. In the time after the Civil War, some doctors believed the suffering of veterans was linked to injuries affecting the heart, a condition they called "irritable heart" or "soldiers' heart," defined by anxiety, trouble breathing, and a rapid pulse. Though no accurate conclusions about the effects of war on soldiers were reached in the time after the Civil War, the chronicling of veterans' symptoms contributed to the future discovery that traumatic wartime experiences led to physical and mental symptoms.

== 20th century ==
The 20th century saw some of the most significant changes in how the disabled were treated medically. In the early 20th century, new inventions regarding treatment were integrated into United States treatment centers such as the lobotomy and hydrotherapy techniques. Towards the end of the century, reform movements regarding disability rights affected treatment plans and hospitals. The federal government got involved in funding and providing better access to varying treatments. The United States as a whole started moving towards more ethical treatments throughout the 20th century as psychiatrists and other medical positions specializing in specific disabilities became more integrated into hospitals and other treatment centers.

=== Mental and developmental disabilities ===
In the 20th century mental disabilities and mental illnesses were becoming more easily distinguished and treated differently. That said, some treatments covered were created to treat many different aspects of the brain. Lobotomy, Mental Hospitals, and PTSD treatment for veterans were popular ways to treat mental disabilities during the 20th century.

==== Lobotomy ====
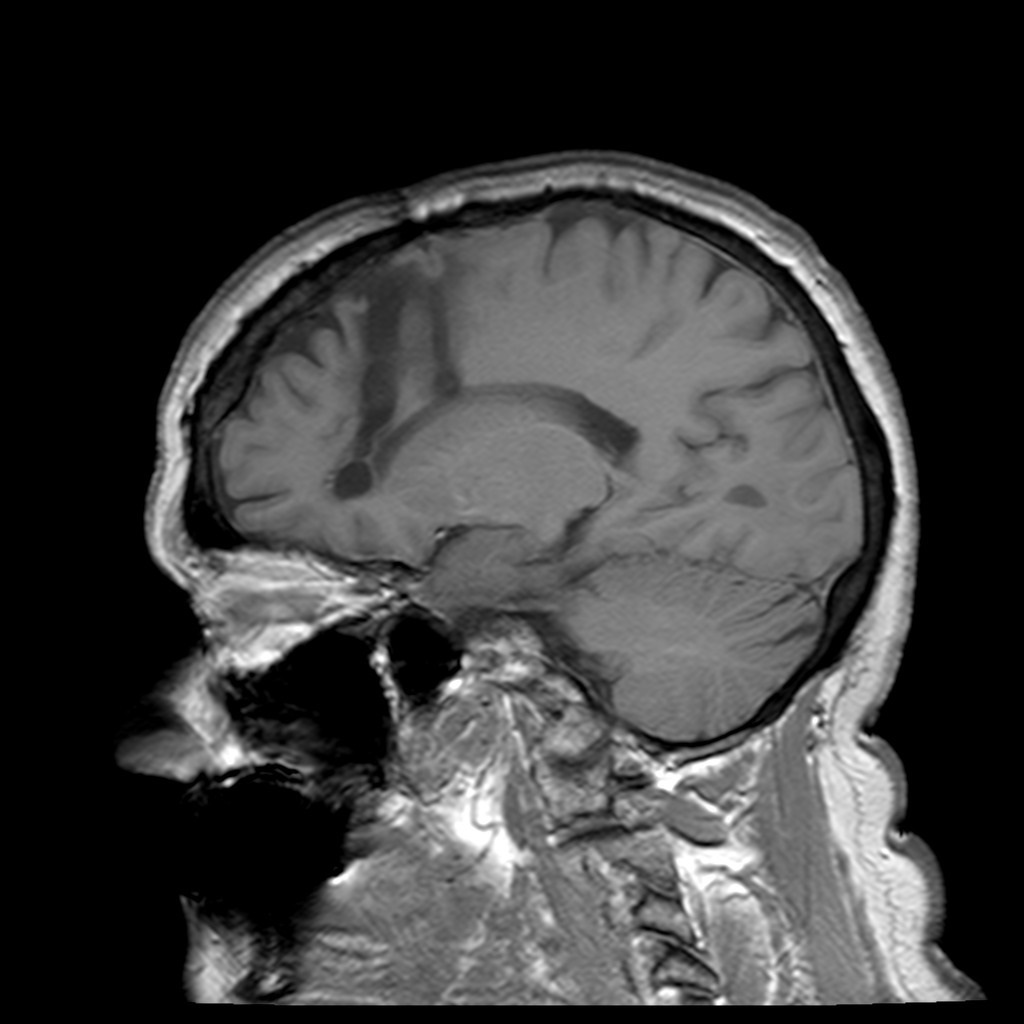
Frontal-leukotomy

One of the most notable treatments for the brain occurring in the 20th century was the lobotomy, which was invented in 1935 by Portuguese Neurologist Egas Moniz. The lobotomy was a surgical procedure performed on the brain that targeted the frontal lobe, which is the part of the human brain that controls emotional response. The reason the lobotomy targeted this particular lobe was to reduce stress and other negative emotions to cure disabilities.

==== Treatment for Veterans ====
During the 20th century, mental hospitals started transitioning away from broad treatment for those with diverse disabilities to more specific treatment for each patient. This more specialized treatment especially sparked post-World War II when veterans were left dealing with PTSD symptoms. An example of a place where veterans were treated for their mental disabilities was in a specialized section of the Massachusetts General Hospital called the Zander Room. The Zander Room included many new technologies to treat patients' physical and mental disabilities. Many veterans were sent there to be treated for their disabilities. They had access to physiotherapists and psychiatrists who treated them until they were rehabilitated and ready to emerge in society once again.

==== Electroconvulsive Therapy ====
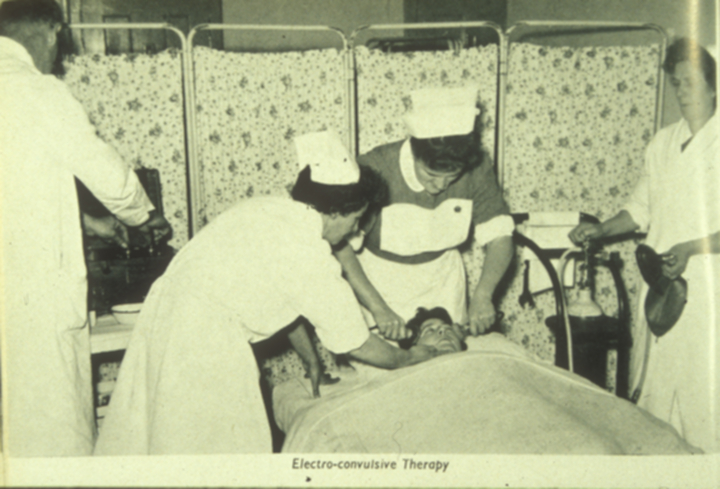
Winwick Hospital, Electroconvulsive therapy, 1957 (14466087218)

Electroconvulsive Therapy or ECT for short is a medical treatment that involves sending electrical currents through the brain. ECT was created by Italian neurologists Ugo Cerletti and Lucio Bini in 1938. Their invention quickly spread to North America and was a common practice in the United States in the late 20th century. ECT was often used to treat a wide range of mental disabilities. Autism, ADHD, OCD, and other mental disorders were often misunderstood during the 20th century, therefore, most doctors treated them all the same way through ECT. ECT was used as a broad treatment plan for those experiencing any mania. Specific treatments, therapy, and medications for each separate illness and disability wouldn't become used in the public until the 21st century.

=== Physical disabilities ===
Similar to the treatments of PTSD post World War II, many emerging physical disabilities were a result of World War II. many new inventions emerged to treat both veterans and other U.S. citizens struggling with physical disabilities including blindness, deafness, amputees, and more.

==== Hydrotherapy ====
Hydrotherapy became an emerging treatment in the 20th century because of its accessibility. The only factor involved in hydrotherapy was water. A patient with a physical disability would be completely submerged in water. The theory was the cold water drew the blood out of the diseased part of the body, curing the patient. This specific treatment was typically used to treat skin conditions as well as infected amputations

==== Epilepsy Treatment ====
A turning point for the treatment of epilepsy occurred in 1912, when Alfred Hauptmann, a German psychiatrist and neurologist, discovered anticonvulsant properties in phenobarbital. Phenobarbital is a drug that is now commonly used to prevent seizures in patients with epilepsy.

==== Treatments for the Deaf ====
Electronic hearing aids were invented early in the 19th century, but didn't become a common practice until the 20th century. Ideas for treating the deaf with hearing aids sparked from Thomas Edison's improvements to the design of the telephone in 1870. This inspired Miller Reese Hutchinson, an American inventor, to invent the first electronic hearing aid in 1898. By the 20th century, advancements had been made to this new technology, and became a popular way to treat the deaf.

=== Government effect of disability treatment ===
The reason disability treatments in the United States were able to have significant developments in the 20th century was due to government interference. The Disability Rights Movement became increasingly popular in the 19th century and as a result pressure on the government to support employment and rights for people with disabilities. The government responded to this by creating laws to support disabled citizens and to help develop treatments. Simultaneously, respect for World War II veterans and disabled citizens as a whole led to reforms in treatments. Still, many controversial treatments occurred during the 20th including sterilization and shock treatments.

==== Eugenic Sterilization Law (1907) ====
In Indiana, the state governor enacted a law in 1907 that called for involuntary sterilization. During the 20th century, it was a common opinion that people with significant mental and physical disabilities should not be allowed to reproduce. People receiving this involuntary sterilization included "criminals, idiots, imbeciles, and rapists.

==== The Rehabilitation Act (1973) ====
The Rehabilitation Act of 1973 was set in place by the federal government to end discrimination in programs that were funded by the federal government. This not only allowed for more opportunities for people with physical and mental limitations to join the workforce but also gave treatment centers more resources to rehabilitate individuals. From then on, advancements in treatments happened rapidly.

==== The Americans with Disabilities Act (1990) ====
The Americans with Disabilities Act of 1990 (ADA) is one of the most famous laws associated with the Disability Rights Movement because it was extremely influential. It covered many different aspects of disability rights including, employment, public accommodations, and even better access to disability services and treatments. Title II of the ADA included access to financial aid in regard to hospitals and clinics that provide treatments and other resources, especially to the deaf.

== 21st century ==
The 21st century has witnessed significant advancements in the treatment of disabilities, particularly looking into areas of larger and more widespread disabilities such as autism, ADHD, physical impairments and various other mental and physical disabilities. Additionally, social stigma surrounding these disabilities has decreased significantly over time, in part due to the spread of media surrounding disabilities.

=== Surgeries ===
Surgeries have played a significant role in addressing disabilities, particularly concerning physical impairments, whether genetic or as the result of a past situation. Since 2000, several innovative surgical procedures have been created for those with disabilities to improve mobility, alleviate pain, and increase functionality in disabled bodies.

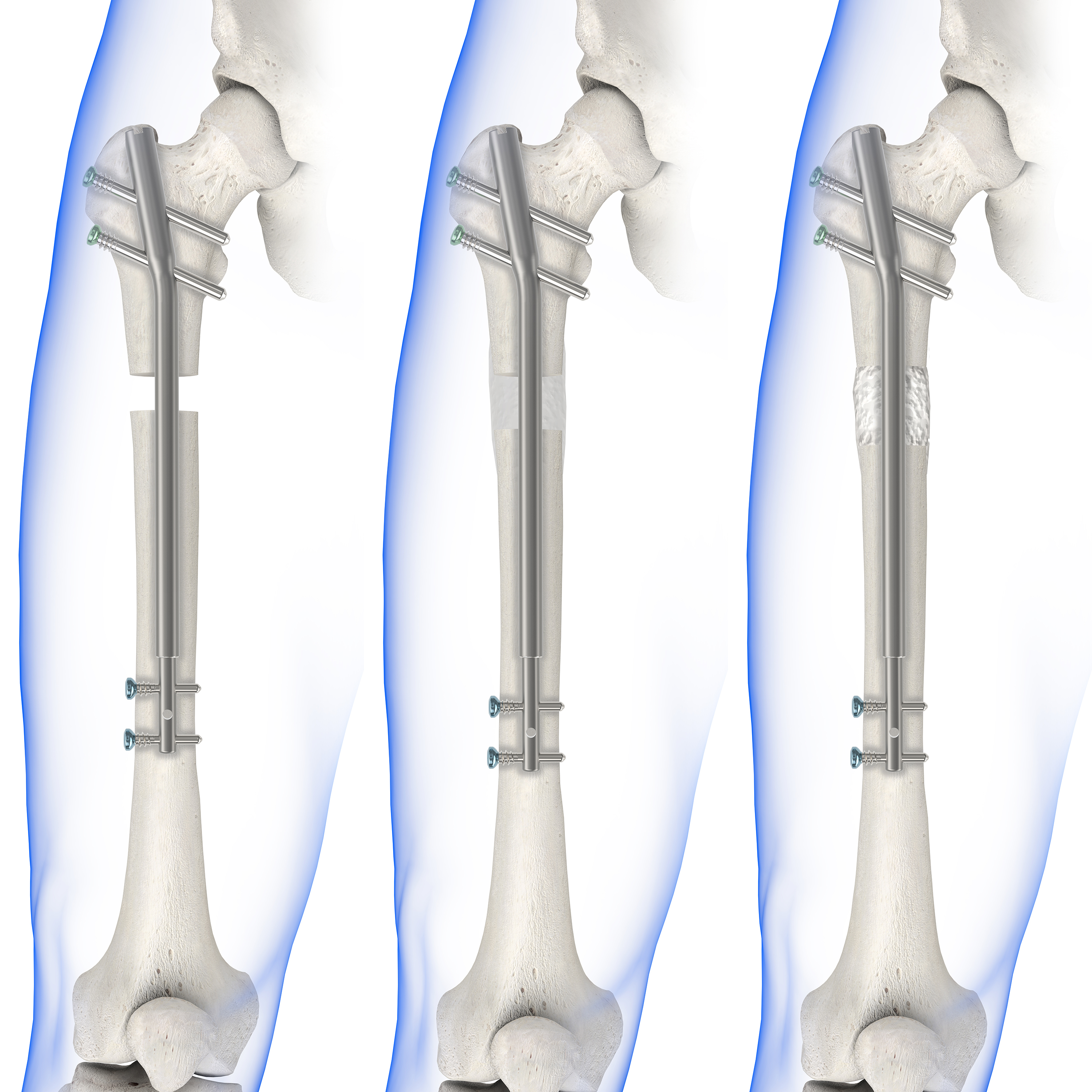
Limb lengthening procedures separate bones, before allowing them to regrow to be a longer length.

One notable advancement in the field of surgeries is in the field of orthopedic surgery. Techniques such as limb lengthening have been used for those who have conditions such as dwarfism. Limb lengthening involves gradual bone displacement to achieve a desired limb length, which offers those with conditions like dwarfism more mobility and independence.

Additionally, advancements in neurosurgery have enabled the treatment of certain neurological conditions associated with disabilities. Deep brain stimulation (DBS), for instance, has been increasingly used to manage symptoms of movement disorders like Parkinson's disease and dystonia. By implanting electrodes deep into specific brain regions and delivering controlled electrical impulses, DBS can help regulate abnormal neural activity, thereby improving motor function and reducing disability-related impairments.

=== Medications ===
The pharmaceutical landscape has witnessed vast developments in the treatment of disabilities through the introduction of novel medications and therapeutic approaches. From psychiatric disorders to neurological conditions, medications have been pivotal in managing symptoms and enhancing the overall well-being of individuals with disabilities.

In the realm of mental health and mental disabilities, the advent of psychotropic medications has revolutionized the treatment of conditions such as autism spectrum disorder (ASD) and attention-deficit/hyperactivity disorder (ADHD). Drugs like selective serotonin reuptake inhibitors (SSRIs) and atypical antipsychotics have been prescribed to alleviate symptoms of anxiety, depression, and behavioral disturbances commonly associated with these disorders.

On the same note, advancements in pharmacotherapy have expanded treatment options for neurological disabilities. Medications such as methylphenidate and amphetamines have been widely prescribed to mitigate symptoms of ADHD, improving attention span, impulse control, and hyperactivity in affected individuals. Additionally, drugs targeting neurotransmitter imbalances have shown promise in managing symptoms of mood disorders and cognitive impairments associated with certain disabilities. In 2002, another ADHD medication called Strattera, a non-stimulant treatment for ADHD, was developed.

==== Therapy, Counseling, and Related Options ====
Therapeutic interventions and counseling services have been integral components of disability treatment, offering individuals valuable support, skill development, and coping strategies to navigate daily challenges effectively.

Behavioral therapy, including applied behavior analysis (ABA), has emerged as an intervention for individuals with an autism spectrum disorder. By employing principles of reinforcement and behavior modification, ABA aims to enhance communication skills, social interactions, and adaptive behaviors, thereby fostering independence and autonomy in individuals with ASD. However, ABA is often criticized by autism rights advocacy groups such as the Autistic Self Advocacy Network for not being effective, being abusive in some cases and being unethical.

Furthermore, occupational therapy and physical therapy have played pivotal roles in addressing physical impairments and enhancing functional abilities among individuals with disabilities. Through targeted exercises, adaptive techniques, and assistive devices, these therapies aim to improve mobility, strength, and coordination, enabling individuals to engage in activities of daily living and participate more fully in society.

Moreover, counseling services and psychotherapy have been instrumental in addressing the psychological and emotional aspects of disability. Cognitive-behavioral therapy (CBT), for example, has been effective in helping individuals with disabilities manage stress, anxiety, and depression, fostering resilience and promoting mental well-being.

== Proposed and future treatments ==
=== Medication expansion ===
The future for those with disabilities when concerning medication lies in advancements in medicine, therapies, and using genetic therapy to optimize aid, minimize side effects, and address the specific and direct needs of each disabled individual using them. This is looked to be accomplished via more progression in the genetics field of science.

One very notable idea being looked into is the exploration of gene therapy and editing technology to target specific genetic mutations and lines of genetic code that are associated with certain disabilities. By delivering new genes or correcting previous genes, gene-based interventions are possible and hold the potential to stop disease progression and cure diseases. Technology such as CRISPR already is looking into ways to treat conditions such as cystic fibrosis.

The future of medications is also looking into advancements in drug delivery systems, that being things such as implantable devices that would allow the medication to go to specific parts of the brain, which would enhance therapeutic effects while also minimizing the side effects that would occur if the medication covered the entire body. If these systems worked properly, it would revolutionize modern medicine and allow those with mental and physical disabilities to live with a higher quality of life.

=== Surgical Expansions ===
The future of surgical interventions for those with disabilities is characterized by advancements in surgery that will be minimally invasive, while also using regenerative medicine. Using biotechnology and restorative biology, surgeons are looking to repair and regenerate tissues and organs, which will restore function and improve the quality of life for those with disabilities.

One futuristic approach being considered is using the technology of 3D printing and tissue engineering technology to make patient-specific implants and lab-made organs to restore functionality and reconstruct any disabled part of a human body. This would work especially well for those who have suffered traumatic injuries, or were born or developed degenerative disease. Working to either restore or fully repair these disabled limbs and parts of the body would give life back to someone who has a body denying a solid quality of life.

Using the ever-growing field of robotics would also aid significantly in surgery. Robots with precision beyond any human's capability would be able to aid in surgeries, significantly increasing the effectiveness of a procedure. On the same note, The growing fields of augmented reality would allow humans to have enhanced visualization of the surgery, and develop ways for those learning to be surgeons to effectively practice surgery in a safe environment, which in turn would create surgeons better equipped to aid in performing life-changing surgeries.
