= Walter and McBean Galleries =

The Walter and McBean Galleries were located at in Russian Hill, as part of the former San Francisco Art Institute's Chestnut campus. It has presented an influential program of exhibitions highlighting innovative work by emerging artists and experimental work by more established artists, from throughout the United States and abroad.

== Directors ==
- Philip E. Linhares (from 1967 to 1972, and 1973 to 1977) he curated "important and often experimental shows during his ten-year tenure, including [...] solo exhibitions of Wally Hedrick, Bruce Conner, William T. Wiley, Imogen Cunningham, Gladys Nilsson, Carlos Villa, and Bruce Nauman." Linhares went on to work with Mills College, and became Chief Curator at the Oakland Museum of California in 1990.
- Helene Fried (in the 1980s)
- Karen Moss (from 1999 to 2004)
- Hou Hanrou (from 2006 to 2012)
- Andrew McClintock (interim director from August 2012 to September 2013), he co-curated the Gutai exhibition in 2013.
- Hesse McGraw (from June 2013 to August 2017)
- Katie Hood Morgan (from 2017 to September 2018)
