= NIAD Art Center =

American nonprofit arts organization

- Formation: 1982; 44 years ago
- Type: 501(c)(3) arts organization
- Headquarters: Richmond, Contra Costa County, California, U.S.
- Website: niadart.org
- Formerly called: Nurturing Independence through Artistic Development

NIAD Art Center (Nurturing Independence through Artistic Development) is a nonprofit 501(c)(3) organization for artists with developmental and physical disabilities, founded in 1982 and based in Richmond, Contra Costa County, California. The organization provides studios, supplies, and gallery space.

== Organization ==
NIAD stands for Nurturing Independence Through Artistic Development. NIAD Art Center has a 4,000 sq. ft. art studio in Richmond, California. The organization works with 75 artists every week; COVID protocols limit the number of artists working on-site to 20, but there is no capacity limit to the number of artists served in NIAD's Virtual Studios. NIAD's Virtual Studio is open four days per week. NIAD's in-person studio is open five days per week. All enrolled artists have intellectual/developmental disabilities. Some of the artists have physical disabilities as well. The artists enrolled at NIAD work with facilitators, who support them in multiple mediums: painting, fiber, ceramics, drawing, sculpture, printmaking, mixed media, performance, sound recording, and digital media.

In addition to the studio space for artists, NIAD Art Center has an exhibition space where they present programming featuring the artists attending the center and non-NIAD artists.

NIAD Art Center has a budget of around $600,000, as of 2012, a third of which is raised through donations and sales.

== Artists associated (*alumni) ==
- Heather Edgar*
- Luis Estrada
- Karen May
- Arstanda Billy White
- Marlon Mullen
- Saul Alegria
- Mireya Betances*
- Lisa Blevens*
- Vanessa Bravo
- Eddie Braught*
- Jeremy Burleson
- Angela Campbell*
- Miguel Chacon*
- Deatra Colbert
- Heather Copus
- Evelyn Davis
- MiaMya Dawson*
- Julio Del Rio
- Carlos Fernandez*
- Sylvia Fragoso
- Jon Fukui*
- Felicia Griffin
- Raven Harper
- Shana Harper
- Peter Harris
- James Heartsill
- Shirley How*
- Julie MacDonald
- Jean McElvane
- Ann Meade
- Jason Powell-Smith
- Shantae Robinson
- Joseph Rux*
- Alice Sampson
- Danny Thach
- Jeffrey Thurston*
- Christian Vassell
- Susan Wise*

== Exhibitions ==
- Projects: Marlon Mullen (2024), The Museum of Modern Art, New York – curated by Ann Temkin
- Into the Brightness (2023), Oakland Museum of California Art
- The Genre Leaps (2018) – organized by curator Margaret Tedesco
- Virgins Virgining (2017) – organized by Micah Wood
- Avatar (2012) – curated by Justine Frischmann
