= Lucien Smith =

American artist (1989–2026)

- Smith in 2021
- Born: Lucien Marc Smith; April 15, 1989; Los Angeles, California, U.S.
- Died: September 7, 2026 (aged 37); New York City, New York, U.S.
- Education: Cooper Union (BFA)
- Known for: Painting
- Patrons: Jeanne Greenberg Rohatyn; Jose Mugrabi
- Website: Official website

Lucien Marc Smith (April 15, 1989 – September 7, 2026) was an American multidisciplinary artist best known for his abstract works and diverse projects. A graduate of the Cooper Union, he was twice featured in Forbes 30 Under 30 in the category of "Art & Style". Smith was called a "wunderkind" by The New York Times. He exhibited at galleries such as Skarstedt and Salon 94, and his work was the subject of solo exhibitions mounted at major museums. His collaborations spanned across creative fields, including partnerships with artists such as Virgil Abloh. He hosted a pop-up art show at which Travis Scott performed and directed a short film narrated by Glenn O'Brien, which was shown at Gagosian Gallery in New York City. Smith was the Inga Maren Otto Fellow in residence at The Watermill Center in 2019.

== Early life and education ==
Smith was born in Los Angeles on April 15, 1989. He was the son of African-American artist Terrence Sanders-Smith and Filipina fashion designer Vivien Ramsay. He attended Santa Monica High School, graduating in 2007. Smith later graduated with a BFA from the Cooper Union School of Art in 2011.

== Ventures ==
In 2017, Smith launched Serving the People (STP), an organization building the future of creativity, collaboration, and communication. Guided by a network of creatives and technologists, STP aims to rebuild the infrastructure for cultural participation.

Also in 2017, Smith turned his Los Angeles studio into a creative project space called Appointment Only. Appointment Only was designed to host garage rock musical performances and events. It also featured a dedicated residency program for guest artists to create and display exhibitions.

In 2021, Smith was appointed Director of the Cultural Innovation Lab at Lobus, an NFT-oriented equity management firm for artists and collectors. In this role, he pitched artists on using blockchain technology to manage their assets. Later in 2021, he released an NFT collection titled Seeds via Lobus.

In 2025, Smith opened a restaurant called FOOD, located in New York Chinatown. Styled as a modern reimagination of the 1970s FOOD, –"a living artwork; a messy, social, affordable place where artists could actually be together"– with canteen style dining and artists as servers, the restaurant closed indefinitely after his death following a memorial dinner service on September 8.

== Health issues and death ==
According to his father, Smith started drinking and doing drugs back in high school. Sanders-Smith remarked that while his son was at Cooper Union, Aurel Schmidt, who was Lucien's girlfriend at the time, called him to inform that Smith had been "doing a lot of heroin". Smith gave a TedTalk at Columbia College in 2014, in which he admitted to consuming PCP. In an interview with Kenny Schachter in 2021, Smith talked about his struggles with substance abuse: "I'm a chronic relapser. I shouldn't drink or do drugs. If you're reading this, don't give me drugs if you see me."

In the weeks preceding his death, Smith struggled with mental health. According to a friend, he described having “bad anxiety attacks” and being at a “low point.” He said that he was also feeling “burnt out” from his restaurant FOOD.

Smith died in New York on September 7, 2026, at the age of 37. At around 8 PM that day, police received a call for a wellness check at an address in Chinatown, Manhattan. Upon arrival, officers discovered Smith unconscious, unresponsive and lying face down. He was pronounced dead at the scene. The New York City medical examiner’s office determined that Smith had died of an accidental overdose of fentanyl and oxycodone.

== Art market ==
Artsy estimated in 2014 that Smith generated a total of $3.7 million at auction that year.

Smith was associated with other young painters, such as Oscar Murillo and Jacob Kassay, whose work appreciated rapidly and were favored by collectors for investment-ready fare. A work bought for $10,000 from Smith's 2011 Cooper Union graduate show was resold in November 2013 for $389,000. In February 2014, his work Two Sides of the Same Coin sold for £224,500 at a Sotheby's auction in London.

By 2015, the art market had cooled down and Smith's art's sale value fell from six-figure peaks down to as low as $17,600.

== Artworks ==
=== Rain Paintings ===
In 2011, Smith executed a suite of abstractions he called Rain Paintings, which he created by spraying fire extinguishers filled with paint. In 2014, an example of these works titled Two Sides of the Same Coin sold at Sotheby's Contemporary Art Evening Auction London's first lot for $372,000 against an estimate of $66,000–99,000.

=== Camo Paintings ===
In 2014, Smith produced Tigris, a show of 11 camouflage-patterned abstract paintings, inspired by the recollection of the first work of art that strongly impacted him—Hokusai's The Great Wave off Kanagawa. The critic Christian Viveros-Fauné described the exhibit as "undistinguished" and "a shrewd career move".

== Exhibitions ==
=== Solo exhibitions ===
- Delay of Game, Tripoli Gallery, Montauk, New York, 2026 (Note: Posthumous)
- Burn Down the House, Kearsey & Gold, London, UK, 2026
- A Day Above Ground is a Good One, Kapp Kapp, New York, 2024
- People are Strange, Willshott Gallery, New York, 2024
- Handyman, Lucien Smith Studio, New York, 2024
- Incidentals: A Brief Survey 2011–2021, Half Gallery, New York, 2021
- Secret Garden, Over the Influence, Hong Kong, 2021
- Southampton Suite, Parrish Art Museum, Southampton, New York, 2020
- Lucien Smith Curated by Bill Powers, Half Gallery, Paris, France, 2019
- Tulips!, The Fireplace Project, Amagansett, New York, 2018
- "Friends", Empty Gallery, New York, 2018
- Cosmas & Damian, Moran Bondaroff, Los Angeles, 2017
- Ship of Fools, Appointment Only, Los Angeles, 2017
- Allergic to Morning, Moran Bondaroff, Los Angeles, 2016
- Vicious Cycles, Surf Lodge, Montauk, 2016
- Tigris, Skarstedt, New York, 2014
- Nature is my Church, Salon 94, New York, 2013
- Scrap Metal, Bill Brady / KC, Kansas City, 2013
- A Clean Sweep, Suzanne Geiss, Co., New York, 2013
- Good Vibrations, Half Gallery, New York, 2012
- Seven Rain Paintings, OHWOW Gallery, Los Angeles, 2012
- Needle in the Hay and Cripple Creek, Ritter-Zamet, London, 2011
- Imagined Nostalgia, Cooper Union, New York, 2011

=== Group exhibitions ===
- 20th Annual Thanksgiving Collective: Breaking Bread, Tripoli Gallery, Wainscott, New York, 2024
- The Smiths, Marlborough Gallery, London, 2019
- Snarl of Twine, Magenta Plains, New York, 2018
- MIDTOWN, curated by Jeanne Greenberg and Michele Maccarone, Lever House, New York, 2017
- LA IntersecCons, Fabien Castanier Gallery, Los Angeles, California, 2017
- Fake News, CES Gallery, Los Angeles, California, 2017
- Family Dinner, Lep Field Gallery, San Luis Obispo, California, 2017
- Intimate Paintings, Half Gallery, New York, 2015
- Matters of Pattern, Skarstedt, New York, 2015
- Prospect New Orleans, curated by Franklin Sirmans, Contemporary Arts Center New Orleans, 2014
- Next, Arsenal, Montréal, Canada, 2014
- ANAMERICANA, curated by Vincenzo de Bellis, American Academy in Rome, Rome, 2013
- The Writing is on the Wall, Jonathan Viner, London, 2013
- Sunsets and Pussy, with Ed Ruscha, Betty Tompkins and Piotr Uklanksi, Marianne Boesky, New York, 2013
- Merci Mercy, curated by Christine Messineo, 980 Madison Avenue, New York, 2013
- Beyond the Object, Brand New Gallery, Milan, 2013
- It Ain't Fair 2012, OHWOW Gallery, Miami Beach, 2012
- Here Comes, Mark Fletcher, New York, 2012
- Homebody, The Stillhouse Group, Brooklyn, 2011
- It Ain't Fair: Materialism, OHWOW Gallery, Miami, 2011
- Black Eye, curated by Nicola Vassell, 54 Crosby St, New York, 2011
- Jack Siegel and Lucien Smith: Imagined Nostalgia, Cooper Union, New York, 2011
- Objects that Love You Back, curated by Grear Patterson, Stillhouse, New York, 2010
- It Ain't Fair 2010, OHWOW Gallery, Miami, 2010
- While It Lasts, The Still House Group, New York, 2010
- New Deal, curated by Kyle Thurman and Matt Moravec, Art Production Fund Gallery, New York, 2009
- May Flowers, curated by Scott Keightley, New York, 2009
- I want a little sugar in my bowl, curated by Terence Koh, ASS Gallery, New York, 2009
- Stillhouse, Seven Eleven Gallery, New York, 2008
