= Gorvy =

Gorvy is a surname. Notable people with the surname include:

- Brett Gorvy (born 1964), British art dealer
- Manfred Gorvy (born 1938), London-based South African investor
