= 303 Gallery =

Art gallery in New York City

- Location of 303 Gallery in New York City
- Established: 1984
- Location: 555 W 21st St, New York
- Coordinates: 40.7404°N 73.9860°W
- Type: Art gallery
- Director: Lisa Spellman
- Owner: Lisa Spellman
- Website: www.303gallery.com

303 Gallery is an art gallery in Manhattan, New York. It was established in 1984 by owner and director Lisa Spellman, described by art critic Jerry Saltz as "one of the greatest New York gallerists of our time". The gallery hosts contemporary works by contemporary American artists, including film, video, and painting.

== History ==
The 303 in the gallery's name references its original address, a fifth-floor, 2,500 sq ft (230 m^{2}) loft at 303 Park Avenue South, as well as Room 303 of the Anderson Galleries, the site of Alfred Stieglitz's "Intimate Gallery" artist collective.

In 1989, 303 Gallery moved to 89 Greene Street in Soho. By 1996, it relocated to West 22nd Street, making it one of the first galleries to do so. From 2008 until 2013, her the gallery was located at a former garage at 547 West 21st Street. In 2013, it temporarily occupied a space designed by StudioMDA on 24th Street.

In 2015, 303 Gallery moved again, this time into a high-rise building designed by Foster and Partners on a lot Spellman purchased at 555 W 21st Street, where it has since been occupying the first and second floor with a total of 12,000 sq ft (1,100 m^{2}) of exhibition space.

Also in 2015, 303 in Print was established by Fabiola Alondra as a publishing arm of the gallery. It publishes limited edition artist's books, ephemera and other printed matter in collaboration with 303 gallery artists.

== Major exhibitions ==
Robert Gober and Christopher Wool, April 15–May 8, 1988. A collaboration between the two artists, this exhibition displayed Christopher Wool's Apocalypse Now painting opposite Bob Gober's sculpture Three Urinals, the first time either work was exhibited.

Karen Kilimnik, April 4–April 25, 1991. Kilimnik's first solo show featured several separate installations in the space, with one leading into the next. They covered a variety of themes, ranging from suicide and drugs, to schoolyard massacres, to Napoleonic clashes.

Sue Williams, May 2–May 30, 1992. Williams' first solo show at the gallery addressed female representation and domestic violence.

Rodney Graham: Vexation Island, November 1–December 20, 1997. First exhibited at the Venice Biennale in the Canadian Pavilion, this piece was shown at 303 Gallery later the same year. The exhibit consists of a looping film where Graham, in character as a shipwrecked 18th-century sailor, is trapped in a cycle of getting knocked out by a fallen coconut, only to reawaken and begin shaking the tree all over again.

Doug Aitken: “100 YRS", February 1–March 30, 2013. The show centered on a "Sonic Fountain" where water dripped from 5 rods suspended from the ceiling, falling into a giant crater dug out of the gallery floor, with underwater microphones amplifying the sound of the droplets. The show had a second installment where performers staged a demolition of the space using saws and drills to cut apart the walls and pile up debris, altering the architecture even further.

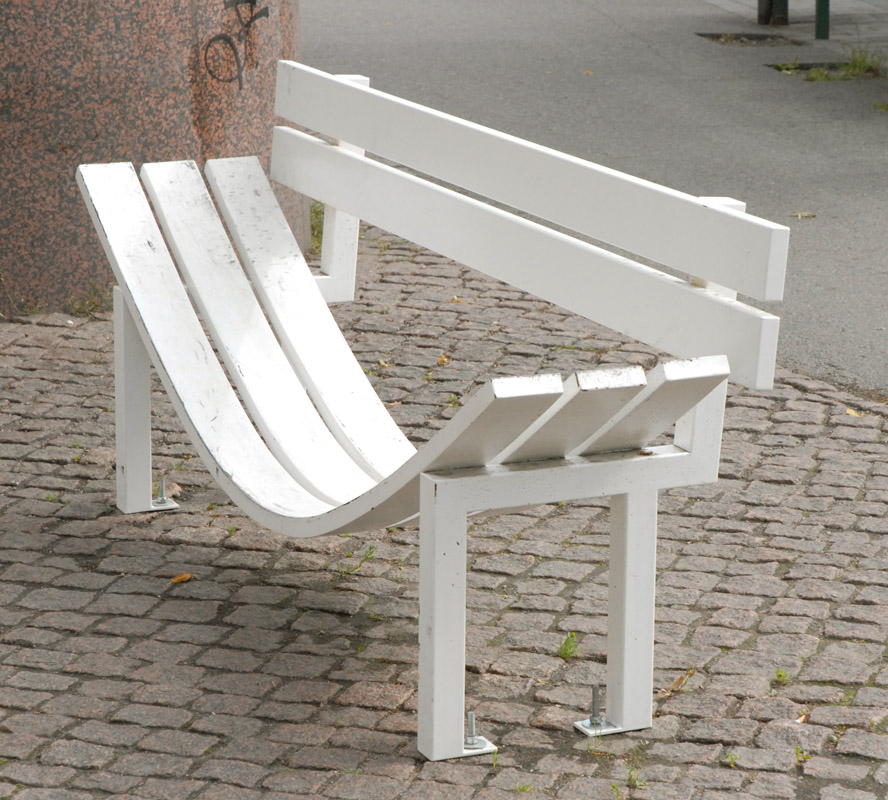
"Modified Social Benches", 2005, exhibited by Johann König and 303 Gallery at Kiasma, Helsinki.

Other notable exhibitions throughout 303 Gallery's history include:

- John Dogg, 1987
- Dan Flavin, Robert Gober, Yves Klein, 1988
- One Leading to Another, 1992
- Vito Acconci, 1993
- Paul Bloodgood, 1996
- Alicja Kwade: I Rise Again, Changed But The Same, 2016
- Tala Madani, 2017
- Karen Kilimnik, 2019

== Artists ==
Among others, 303 Gallery has been representing the following living artists:

- Doug Aitken
- Sam Falls (since 2018)
- Hans-Peter Feldmann
- Ceal Floyer
- Dominique Gonzalez-Foerster
- Kim Gordon (since 2019)
- Rodney Graham
- Mary Heilmann
- Jeppe Hein
- Matt Johnson (since 2012)
- Jacob Kassay
- Karen Kilimnik
- Alicja Kwade
- Elad Lassry
- Tala Madani (since 2017)
- Florian Maier-Aichen
- Nick Mauss
- Kristin Oppenheim
- Marina Pinsky (since 2016)
- Rob Pruitt (since 2020)
- Collier Schorr
- Stephen Shore
- Sue Williams
- Jane and Louise Wilson

In the past, 303 Gallery helped launch the careers of artists Christopher Wool, Robert Gober, Rirkrit Tiravanija and Karen Kilimnik. It also represented Thomas Demand, Andreas Gursky, Laylah Ali, Thomas Ruff, Inka Essenhigh and Laurie Simmons.
