= Brett Gorvy =

British art dealer (born 1964)

- Born: Brett Paul Gorvy; July 1964 (age 61); South Africa
- Occupations: Art dealer and gallerist
- Known for: Lévy Gorvy Dayan
- Spouse: Amy Gold
- Parent: Manfred Gorvy

Brett Paul Gorvy (born July 1964) is a British art dealer. He is a co-founder and partner (with Dominique Lévy and Amalia Dayan) of Lévy Gorvy Dayan, a gallery with offices in New York City, London, Paris, and Hong Kong.

== Early life ==
Brett Gorvy was born in South Africa, one of four children of billionaire financier Manfred Gorvy and his wife, Lydia.

== Career ==
In December 2016, Gorvy left his position as chairman and international head of post-war and contemporary art at Christie's after 23 years. It was then that he set up his gallery with Dominique Lévy. This led to the rebranding of Levy's Madison Avenue Gallery as Lévy Gorvy. In 2021, Lévy Gorvy announced plans to merge with Jeanne Greenberg Rohatyn and Amalia Dayan to form LGDR. In August 2023, LGDR announced it would continue operations under the banner of Lévy Gorvy Dayan. Jeanne Greenberg Rohatyn left the existing partnership to reopen Salon 94.

== Personal life ==
Gorvy is married to Amy Gold, an independent art dealer, who worked for Christie's for ten years, before becoming a senior director at the New York gallery L&M Arts, run by Dominique Lévy and Robert Mnuchin. They live on the Upper West Side in Manhattan and collect works on paper from the 1930s onwards. They have one daughter together.
