= George Cohen (disambiguation) =

George Cohen (1939–2022), England international footballer.

George Cohen may also refer to:

- George Cohen (artist) (1919–1999), American painter and art professor
- George Getzel Cohen (1927–2023), South African physician and politician
- George H. Cohen, director of the Federal Mediation and Conciliation Service in the United States
- George Cohen, Sons and Company, a scrap metal merchant in London
- George Washington Cohen, a 1928 American silent comedy drama film

== See also ==
- George M. Cohan (1878–1942), American entertainer, actor, singer and dancer
- George Cohon (1937–2023), American-born Canadian businessman
