= Rohatyn (surname) =

Rohatyn is a surname. Notable people with the surname include:

- Felix Rohatyn (1928–2019), American investment banker and diplomat
- Jeanne Greenberg Rohatyn (born c. 1967), American gallerist
