= Parktown Boys' High School =

Parktown Boys High School
- Parktown Boys High School school crest

Location
- 20 Wellington Road, Parktown; Johannesburg, Gauteng, 2193; South Africa; 26°11′6″S 28°2′6″E

Information
- School type: All-boys public school
- Motto: 'Arise'; English from the Latin 'Surgite'
- Established: 1923; 103 years ago
- Sister school: Parktown High School for Girls
- School number: +27 (011) 462 4531
- Headmaster: Mr. Kevin Stippel
- Staff: 50 (full-time)
- Grades: 8–12
- Gender: Male
- Age: 14 to 18
- Enrollment: >900 pupils
- Language: English
- Schedule: 07:30 - 14:00
- Campus: Urban Campus
- Campus type: Suburban
- Houses: Trojans; Romans; Spartans; Thebans; Tuscans; Vulcans
- Colours: Red; Black; White
- Rivals: Jeppe High School for Boys; King Edward VII School; St John's College, Johannesburg
- Publication: The Rampant; Surgite
- School fees: R90,000(boarding); R65,000(tuition)
- Former pupils: Old Parktonians; Old Boys
- Badges: Rampant Lion
- Website: http://www.parktownboys.com/

Parktown Boys' High School is a public English medium high school for boys situated in Parktown, a suburb of Johannesburg in the Gauteng province of South Africa. It is one of the oldest schools in Johannesburg. Parktown Boys' sister school is Parktown High School for Girls.

== History ==
The school was founded in 1920, and was originally known as North Western High School. The original school was based in disused wood and iron buildings which had previously been police barracks at the top of Canary Street in Auckland Park. There were eighty-seven pupils in five Form II classes, four for boys and one for girls, with acting Headmaster, C. Hare. The site is now occupied by the South African Broadcasting Corporation.

The Acting Director of Education, W.E.C. Clarke, the Inspector of High Schools, officially opened the new school with an address to the scholars and staff. He apologised for the lack of decent furniture and playing fields and promised that a new modern high school for boys would be built on the Parktown Ridge overlooking Milner Park and a new high school for girls near Zoo Lake.

The first Headmaster, P.M. Druce, arrived at the beginning of 1921. In February, the name of the school was changed to North Western High School, and in April, the first hatbands and ties arrived. The colours were purple and white.

On 1 September 1921, the school was divided into five houses: Romans, Spartans, Thebans, Trojans and Tuscans. On 19 September, the name was changed again, this time to Parktown Boys' High School, with the motto: Arise, and the school badge a rampant lion. When the Rand Revolt took place in 1922, the school, which was in no-man's-land, had to be evacuated for a short while.

At the beginning of 1923, the school boys moved to new buildings on Parktown Ridge. They took little with them except the school name, motto and badge, the names of the five houses and the traditions they had built up. When the school reopened in the new premises, there were 435 boys on the roll, and the school colours were changed to red and black. The girls remained at Auckland Park.

The Old Parktonian Association, which was formed in 1925, bought the grounds in Bedfordview but later moved to Craighall Park. Strong links with the school are maintained.

When Mr Druce retired in 1938, he was succeeded in turn by B.A. Logie, C.A. Yates, F.J. Marais, J.A. Cameron, N.A.M. Scheepers and T.P. Clarke, Parktown's previous Headmaster for a record 23 years, as well as Mr C. Niemand, and Mr D. Bradley.

In 1985, Druce Hall was opened to accommodate boarders and, following the school's tradition in the classics. In 1987, the name Vulcan was given to the sixth school house to which all boarders belong.

Parktown Boys' High School was among the first government schools to allow boys who were discriminated against because of their colour into a mainstream 'white' school in 1991.

Parktown Boys' High School was the first school in South Africa to install an international standard water-based Astroturf playing surface. This surface has hosted many national and international games. More recently, Parktown has built Surgite House overlooking the McCorkell Oval (named after Neil McCorkell the school's former cricket coach and former Hampshire county cricketer who became a centurion in March 2012) to incorporate the administration and entertainment needs of Old Parktonians, as well as the Sydney Klevansky Sports and Cultural Centre.

Parktown Boys' is consistently rated as among the best-performing schools in South Africa, as well as in Africa. Parktown Boys' also consistently ranks at least top 30 in the annual sports rankings, which shows the high quality of sports at Parktown Boys’.

Parktown Boys' has a history which includes the use of boaters (called 'bashers'), a distinctive red and black uniform, school songs, and particularly 'Parktonian' language which has evolved over the years. The school motto is 'Arise' ('Surgite' in Latin). The original school buildings have provincial heritage sites status.

Mr Kevin Stippel is the current headmaster at Parktown Boys'. Previous headmasters were (from 1920): Mr C. Hare (Acting), Mr P.M.Druce, Mr B.A. Logie, Mr C.A. Yates, Mr F.J. Marais, Mr J.A. Cameron, Mr N.A.M. Scheepers, Mr T.P. Clarke, Mr C. Niemand, Mr R. Pillay (Acting), Mr D. Bradley and Mr Malcolm Williams.

The school is divided from Grades 8 to 12 (Matric), and grades are referred to as 'Forms' at the school. Cultural activities refer to all extramural activities, excluding sporting activities. Cultural life also extends to visits to musical performances.

The Parktown Basher

Numerous summer sports are offered by the school.

== Druce Hall ==
The School's Mascot – The Rampant Lion, with members of the Cadet Band performing the school War Cry.

The school has a weekly boarding establishment (i.e. from Sunday evening to Friday afternoon), which is known as The Druce Hall. It was officially opened on 9 June 1985 and is named after P. M. Druce, the first headmaster.

The boarding is supervised with a ratio of one master to every 15 boys.

== Traditions ==
=== Orientation and initiation ===
As part of their orientation and initiation into the school, all 'formies' (Grade 8/Form I) receive a coloured button to wear on their blazer which indicates their 'formie' status as well as what house they belong to for the duration of their Form I year. At the end of their second week of school, all formies are assigned an 'Old Pot' who will help and guide that formie through their first few months at the school. The Old Pot/New Pot braai is held in the first term.

Harmful 'initiation' is banned throughout the school.

=== Cadets ===
Parktown Boys' High School is one of the few schools in South Africa that still continues with the tradition of Cadets and Cadet practice every week, which involves many push-ups and exercises for younger grades.

=== Memorial parade ===
Parktown conducts a Memorial Parade and Service on the Sunday nearest 11 November (Remembrance Day) every year for Old Parktonians and South Africans in general who have died in various conflicts around the world. It is compulsory for all Form Is and IVs to attend.

=== Third Cricket/Hockey v Teachers Matches ===
Every year, hockey and cricket matches are held between the staff and the Third teams.

== Old Parktonians ==
The Parktonian Foundation, Surgite House, the Parktown Waterpolo Club, a Facebook page, the annual Surgite publications and the Old Parktonian Sports Club, all aim to foster the Old Parktonian Community.

== Notable alumni ==
Past matriculants of the school have gone on to be leaders throughout South Africa: from leaders in commerce, Members of Parliament, renowned academics, Springboks rugby players, Protea cricket players, Bafana Bafana footballer/Soccer team and other internationally renowned sportsmen, musicians and artists.

Some of these include:

- Sir Henry Benson, President of the ICAEW, Member of the House of Lords
- Byron Bertram, South African professional tennis player
- John Burland, C.B.E., engineer and researcher
- Christo Coetzee, distinguished South African artist
- George Getzel Cohen, radiologist and anti-apartheid campaigner, Member of the Royal College of Physicians and Surgeons
- Ian Davidson, Member of Parliament and Chief Whip of the Democratic Alliance
- Wayne Ferreira, international tennis player and Olympic silver medalist
- Manfred Gorvy, businessman and founder of the Hanover Acceptances Group
- David Ipp, South African and Australian jurist
- Martin Israel, pathologist and priest
- Adam Kuper, anthropologist
- Brigadier General Dick Lord, pilot, winner of the Distinguished Service Cross
- Raymond Louw, journalist, editor and media commentator
- Jackie Mekler, long-distance runner. Three ultra marathon world records, five Comrades wins and ten Comrades gold medals amongst numerous other athletic feats
- Jack Penn, M.B.E., Fellow of the Royal College of Surgeons, author, and sculptor
- Eric Sturgess, international tennis player who reached the finals of three Grand Slam singles tournaments and won six Grand Slam doubles tournaments
- John Varty, wildlife conservationist and filmmaker
- Joseph Wolpe, psychologist and psychology theorist
- Robert Udwin, former President of the English Rugby Football Union

Academics include:

- Charles Feinstein, South African and British economic historian, Cambridge and Harvard Professor,
- Steven E. Aschheim, Professor of German Cultural History

=== Football/Soccer ===
- Bradley Carnell, is a former South African footballer and coach who played as a defender. During his playing career, he represented several clubs, including Wits University, Kaizier Chiefs, VfB Stuggart and Borussia Monchengladbach. As a coach, he has worked with several clubs, including New York City FC, St. Louis City and Philadelphia Union in the Major League Soccer.
- Michael Morton, is a former South African professional footballer who played as a defender. He spent more than 19 years as a professional footballer player, including a spell with Cape Town Spurs in the Premier Soccer League (PSL). Following his retirement from professional football, Morton became involved in football-related media, producing content across platforms including podcasts, YouTube and Instagram under the name "Mike Morton Talks Football".
- Lyle Foster, is a South African professional footballer who plays as a forward. He began his professional career with Orlando Pirates and subsequently played for clubs including Monaco and Victoria Guimaraes. He has also represented the South Africa National team and now plays for Premier League club Burnley.
- Thabiso Monyane, is a South African professional footballer who plays as a right-back for Kaizier Chiefs. He has also played for Orlando Pirates.
- Ethan Brooks, is a South African professional footballer who has played for clubs including TS Galaxy, Ama-Zulu FC, and Greek club Panserraikos F.C. He currently plays as a midfielder for Durban City.
- Wade Poole, is a South African professional footballer who plays as a centre back for Moroka Swallows. He has also spent time on loan with NB La Masia FC, which competes in the SAFA Second Division.
- Gopolang Taunyana, is a South African professional footballer who currently plays at Stellbenbosch FC. He came through the youth systems at Kazier Chiefs and was a member of the South African Under-20 team that won the 2025 U20 African Cup of Nations in Egypt.

The following Old Parktonians have represented the South African National Rugby Team (the Springboks). Parktown Boys’ has produced the second highest number of rugby provincial players in Johannesburg and the third highest number of SA schools rugby players in Johannesburg.

- Paul Campbell Robertson Bayvel: Scrumhalf played 10 tests between 1974 and 1976.
- Peter Arnold Cronjé: Outside centre playing 7 tests and scoring 3 tries between 1971 and 1974.
- James Dalton, he was part of the team that won the 1995 Rugby World Cup.
- Alan Menter: Came on for the Springboks on the tour matches to France in 1968
- Jake White: Coached the 2007 IRB World Cup winning Springboks and started his rugby coaching career at Parktown Boys' High School in 1982, as well as coaching the nearly unbeaten 1st XI team of the All Blacks(Parktown Boys’) somewhere in the 1980s.

=== Cricket ===
The following Old Parktonians have represented the South African national cricket team (The Proteas). However, there are over 40 other Old Parktownians who have played first-class cricket and county cricket, which are not listed here.

- Ronnie Grieveson
- David Ironside
- E.S. (Bob) Newson
- Douglas Neilson
- Tabraiz Shamsi

=== Hockey ===
Old Parktonians who have played for the national hockey side are:

- Neville Berman, Matthew Brown, Dylan Coombes, Miguel Da Graca, Noel Day, Keith Jones, Lance Louw, Brian Morton, Andre du Preez, Justin Rosenburg, Ricky West,

=== Music and Art ===
Some notable musicians and artists who attended Parktown Boys' High School are:

- Roland Brener, artist and sculptor.
- Pallance Dladla, actor
- Watkin Tudor Jones, rapper
- Trevor Rabin, guitarist, composer, vocalist and, more recently, noted film score composer.

== Controversies ==
In September 2018, the former water polo coach at Parktown, Collan Rex, pleaded guilty to 144 charges of sexual assault against multiple Parktown pupils and was subsequently sentenced to 23 years in prison.

On 15 January 2020, a 13-year-old pupil drowned while attending an orientation camp at the Nyati Bush and River Break lodge, near Pretoria. The principal was dismissed in October 2020 following an investigation. The principal was subsequently reinstated after being cleared of any wrongdoing with the latest investigations being focused on Nyathi Bush and River Break lodge.
