= Kilimnik =

Kilimnik is a surname. Notable people with the surname include:

- Karen Kilimnik (born 1955), American painter and installation artist
- Konstantin Kilimnik (born 1970), Russian-Ukrainian political consultant
