= Oksana Semenik =

Ukrainian art historian, journalist, and public figure

- Оксана Олексіївна Семенік
- Born: Kyiv
- Education: Taras Shevchenko National University of Kyiv,
- Occupations: Art historian, journalist, and public figure

Oksana Oleksiyivna Semenik (Ukrainian: Оксана Олексіївна Семенік) is a Ukrainian art historian, journalist, and public figure. She is known for her initiative to "decolonize" Ukrainian art in global museums and for popularizing the work of Ukrainian artists.

== Early life and education ==
Semenik was born in Kyiv.

She attended the "Yun-Pres" youth journalism club at the Kyiv Palace of Children and Youth. After graduating from Taras Shevchenko National University of Kyiv, she obtained a degree as a Spanish translator, and she studied art history at the Faculty of History of Taras Shevchenko National University of Kyiv and at Rutgers University (New Jersey, U.S.). In 2022, while studying in the US, she interned at the Zimmerli Museum.

== Career and research ==
In 2023, she was a non-resident fellow at the Munk School at the University of Toronto. Since 2024, she has been a researcher at the Ukrainian Museum in New York City.

She is active in journalism, having published articles on culture and art for various publications, including "Ukrainska Pravda", "LB.ua", "Korydor", "Vogue Ukraine", and "Chytomo".

She conducts research on 20th-century Ukrainian art and the Chornobyl disaster in art. She co-curated two exhibitions: "Colori Splenti" (2024, Milan, Italy; with Ilona Demchenko) and "Village to Modern" (2025, The Ukrainian Museum, New York, with Peter Doroshenko). She is a co-author of the books "Telegraf. Volia" (2023), "Alla Horska", "Oleksandra Ekster. The Stage is the World" (both 2024), "Tatlin: Kyiv", "Village to Modern" (both 2025), and the catalog "Maria Prymachenko. Slava Ukraini" (2023). Author of the book "Maria Prymachenko Bez Mifiv" (2025).

From November 2023, Semenik has been the author and host of the radio program "Ukrainian Art in Names" on "Radio Kultura", where she talks about the lives and works of prominent Ukrainian artists. Her work focuses on popularizing Ukrainian culture and fighting against Russian cultural imperialism. In July 2024, she launched the podcast "Our Art" on the same radio station.

She gained the most popularity for her campaign to "decolonize" Ukrainian art in global museum collections. She initiated this campaign in 2022. The campaign's goal was to persuade international museums to rename the works of Ukrainian artists that had long been labeled as "Russian". The main platform for communication was her English-language Twitter account "Ukrainian Art History", where she posted historical and biographical information about Ukrainian artists. The American historian Timothy Snyder follows her posts.

Together with Oleksandra Kovalchuk from the Odesa Art Museum and culturologist Mariam Naiem, she succeeded in getting several leading museums worldwide to correct the labels under paintings, including:

- The Metropolitan Museum of Art in New York recognized Ilya Repin and Arkhip Kuindzhi as Ukrainian artists, and the artist Ivan Aivazovsky as an Armenian artist.
- The Los Angeles County Museum of Art (LACMA) changed the labeling of Aivazovsky's work.
- The Brooklyn Museum renamed Repin's painting "Winter Scene in Ukraine" according to its true place of creation.
- The Metropolitan Museum and the National Gallery in London renamed Edgar Degas' ballerinas from "Russian dancers" to "dancers in traditional Ukrainian folk dress".
