= Sue Williams (painter) =

American artist

- Born: 1954 (age 71–72); Chicago, Illinois, U.S.
- Known for: Contemporary art
- Movement: Painting, feminism

Sue Williams is an American artist born in 1954. She came to prominence in the early 1980s, with works that echoed and argued with the dominant postmodern feminist aesthetic of the time. In the years since, her focus has never waned yet her aesthetic interests have moved toward abstraction along with her subject matter and memories. She lives and works in New York.

== Early life and education ==
Sue Williams was born in 1954 in Chicago Heights, Illinois. Williams started her education at Cooper Union in 1973. She later transferred to California Institute of the Arts and graduated with a B.F.A in 1976.

== Work ==
In the 1990s violence against women was one of the main themes of Sue Williams' work. She often represents women as sex objects, frequently adding sarcastic texts. In later work text is usually absent.

== Exhibitions ==
Sue Williams is represented by 303 Gallery, New York; Regen Projects, Los Angeles; Skarstedt, New York; and Galerie Eva Presenhuber, Zurich.

The following is a list of selected exhibitions:

- Whitney Biennial, New York (1993)
- Whitney Biennial, New York (1995)
- Whitney Biennial, New York (1997)
- Contemporary Art Project, Seattle Art Museum (2002)
- Art for the Institution and the Home, Secession, Vienna (2002)
- Defamation of Character, MoMA P.S.1 New York (2006)
- Comic Abstraction: Image Breaking, Image Making, MoMA, New York (2007)
- The Third Mind, Palais de Tokyo, Paris (2007)
- Project for the New American Century, David Zwirner, New York (2008)
- Rebelle: Art and Feminism 1969-2009, Museum voor Moderne Kunst Arnhem, Netherlands (2009)
- Visceral Bodies, Vancouver Art Gallery, Vancouver (2010)
- Figuring Color, Institute of Contemporary Art, Boston (2012)
- Comic Future, Ballroom Marfa, TX (2013)
- Take It or Leave It: Institution, Image, Ideology, Hammer Museum, Los Angeles (2014)
- America is Hard to See, Whitney Museum of American Art, New York (2015)
- Painting 2.0 Expression in the Information Age, Museum Brandhorst, Munich (2015)
- Greater New York, MoMA PS1, New York (2015)
- Better Than de Kooning, Villa Merkel, Esslingen (2015)
- Don't Look Back: The 1990s, MoCA, Los Angeles (2016)
- Zeitgeist, MAMCO, Geneva (2017)

== Collections ==
- Hirshhorn Museum, Washington DC
- Los Angeles Museum of Modern Art, CA
- Museum of Contemporary Art San Diego, CA
- Museum of Modern Art, New York, NY
- New Museum, New York, NY
- Santa Barbara Art Museum, Santa Barbara, CA
- Seattle Art Museum, Seattle, WA
- Whitney Museum, New York, NY

== Awards ==
- 1993 Guggenheim Fellowship

== Publications ==
- Sue Williams (2000), published by 303 Gallery.
- A Fine Line (2003), published by Palm Beach Institute of Contemporary Art.
- Art for the Institution and the Home (2003), published by Walther König.
- They Eat Shit (2010 edition), published to accompany the 1993 exhibition at the Walter/McBean Gallery of the Chicago Art Institute.
- They Eat Shit + Die (2010), published to accompany the 2010 exhibition at 303 Gallery.
- Sue Williams (2016), published by JRP-Ringier.
