= Jay Sae Jung Oh =

South Korean artist (born 1982)

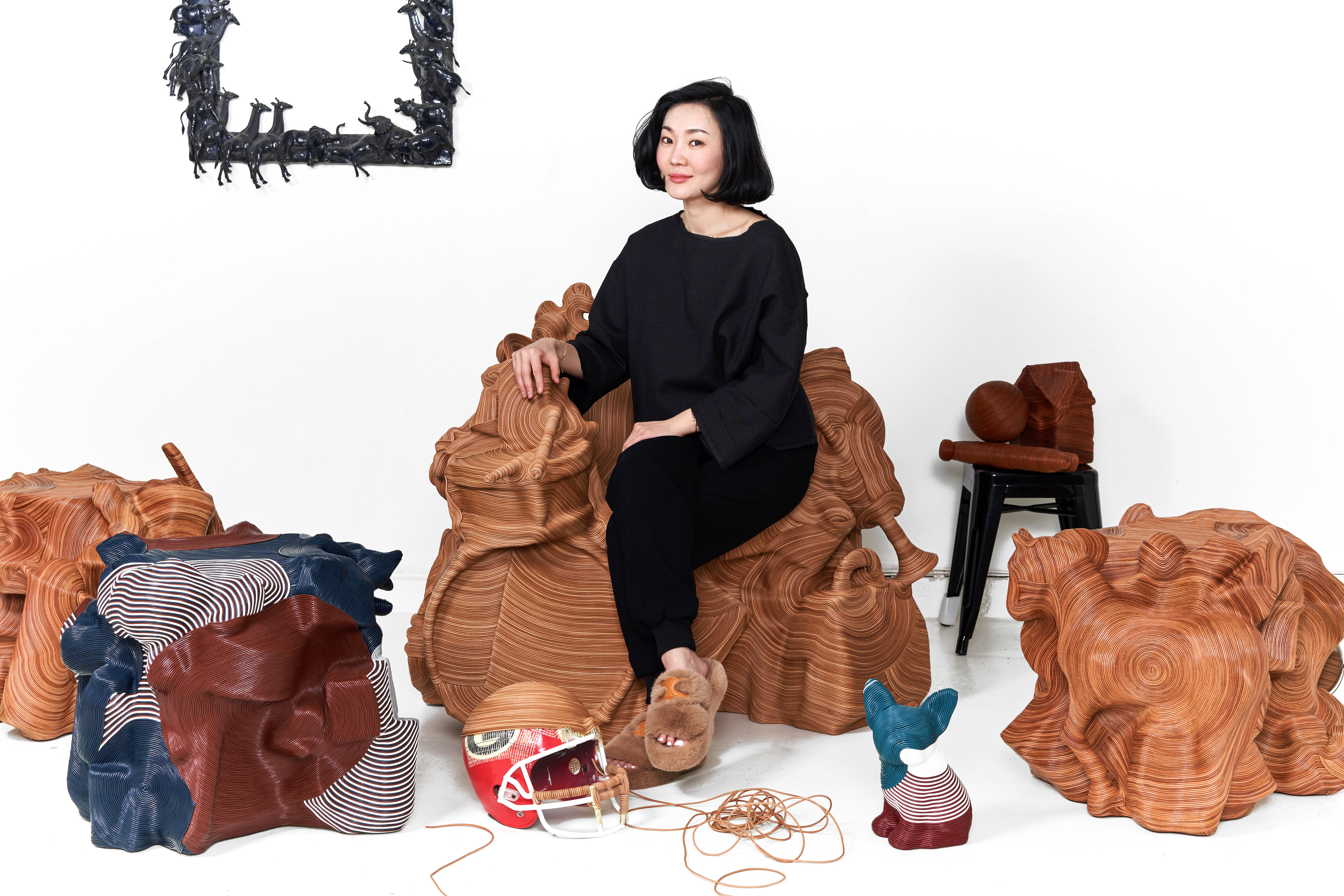
- Born: 1982 (age 43–44); Seoul
- Education: Kookmin University, Cranbrook Academy of Art
- Occupations: Artist, designer
- Website: www.saejungoh.com

Jay Sae Jung Oh (born 1982) is a South Korean-born, Seattle-based artist and designer. She is known for her sustainable and environmentally-friendly recycled plastic and leather cord furniture works notably, her Salvage Chair series made with everyday objects intricately hand wrapped in raw leather creating a unified a sculptural design object.

Oh has shown works internationally at the Chatsworth House in the U.K., San Francisco Museum of Modern Art in California, and Cooper Hewitt, Smithsonian Design Museum in New York. Her works are included in the collection of SFMOMA, the Carnegie Museum of Art, and Cranbrook Art Museum. She is the founder and designer behind the pet brand Boo Oh.

== Early life and education ==
Jay Sae Jung Oh was born in South Korea. She graduated from the Kookmin University in Seoul, South Korea with a Bachelor's in Fine Arts and a Master's in Fine Arts degree in Sculpture.

Oh graduated from the Cranbook Academy of Art in Michigan with a Master's of Fine Arts Degree in 3D Industrial Design.

== Work ==
In 2011, she won the Mercedes-Benz Emerging Artist Award and Design Quest 2011 Furniture Design Competition for her Jute Side Table. The work is an early rendition of her Savage Chair series and includes "discarded plastic objects, assembled them together, and wrapped them with a natural material."

From 2013-2016, Oh was a visiting professor at the University of Illinois at Chicago for industrial design.

She won the Best Contemporary Design Award at Design Miami in 2019. The works presented were an assortment of typical thrifted items arranged and wrapped in leather cord.

Oh's work was included in the 2023 exhibition Mirror Mirror: Reflections on Design at Chatsworth at Chatsworth House. Her work was also featured at Parall(elles): A History of Women in Design at the Montreal Museum of Fine Art, Montreal, Canada.

Oh's work has been featured in Architectural Digest, Elle Decor, The New York Times, Fast Company, Washington Post, and Vogue. Oh works with Salon 94 Design gallery in New York

=== Salvage series ===
Oh's most notable work includes a series of furniture part of her Salvage Chair series (née Savage Chair series). The works are made from cowhide leather, various discarded objects, jute, and discarded plastics. This series comes in the form of functional design objects such as chairs, sofas, wall organizers, stools and planters in shades of tanned leather or black. An assortment of identifiable objects can be found embedded into the exterior of works in the series. Parts of bicycles, guitars, purses and bags, a children's rocking horse, and more are visible on the chair's surface outside of the seating area.

== Public collections ==
- Cooper Hewitt, Smithsonian Design Museum, New York, NY
- San Francisco Museum of Modern Art, San Francisco, CA
- Carnegie Museum of Art, Pittsburgh, PA
- Cranbrook Museum, Bloomfield Hills, MI
- Kookmin University, Seoul, Korea
