= Peter Doroshenko =

American art curator (born 1962)

Peter Doroshenko (born 1962) is an American art historian, museum director, and writer.

== Life and career ==
Peter Doroshenko was born in 1962 in Chicago, Illinois, United States. He was the director at The Ukrainian Museum, New York, New York, United States. Before his arrival in New York, Doroshenko was the Executive Director at Dallas Contemporary, Dallas, Texas, United States. He has held director and curator positions over the past thirty years, including the Pinchuk Art Centre, Kyiv, Ukraine; Baltic Centre for Contemporary Art, Gateshead, England; SMAK - Stedelijk Museum voor Actuele Kunst, Ghent, Belgium; inova (Institute of Visual Arts), Milwaukee; Contemporary Arts Museum, Houston; and Everson Museum of Art, Syracuse.

In the last thirty-five years, Doroshenko has organized one-person exhibitions, including artists: Gretchen Bender, Michaël Borremans, Ross Bleckner, Candice Breitz, Maurizio Cattelan, Francesco Clemente, Dan Colen, Sam Durant, Eric Fischl, Tomoo Gokita, Dominique Gonzales-Foerster, Meschac Gaba, Kendell Geers, Loris Gréaud, Andreas Gursky, Peter Halley, Lonnie Holley, Peter Hujar, Pierre Huyghe, Ilya and Emilia Kabakov, Luisa Lambri, Ange Leccia, John McCracken, Boris Mikhailov, Renata Morales, Mariko Mori, Philippe Parreno, João Penalva, Richard Phillips, Bojan Sarcevic, Kimsooja, David Salle, Julian Schnabel, Pascal Marthine-Tayou, Juergen Teller, Barthélémy Toguo, Salla Tykka, Sam Taylor-Johnson, Piotr Uklanski, Erwin Wurm, Yelena Yemchuk, and Liu Xiaodong.

Doroshenko has written or contributed to several books and numerous exhibition catalogues on artists' work including: Carlos Rolon, FriendsWithYou, Dora Garcia, Joseph Havel, Peter Schuyff, Uri Tzaig, Adriana Varejão, and Liu Xiaodong. In 2010, he published a monograph on collectors who have constructed their own personal museums entitled, Private Spaces for Contemporary Art, with Rispoli Books, Brussels.

Doroshenko was a visiting lecturer at the Core Program at the Glassell School of Art, Houston, from 1998 to 2006, and at the Universität für Angewandte Kunst, Vienna, from 2004 to 2006. He has also lectured extensively at other post-graduate programs and residencies over the years including: de Ateliers, Amsterdam; Hoger Instituut voor Schone Kunsten, Antwerp; Jan van Eyck Academie, Maastricht; Pavillon/Palais de Tokyo, Paris; and the Whitney Independent Study Program, New York City.

From 1996 until 1998, Doroshenko was a board trustee at the Soros Center for Contemporary Art, Kyiv. In 2002, France awarded Doroshenko with the Chevalier of the Order of Arts and Letters for his work with French artists and post-structuralist theory. In 2007, 2009, and 2017, he was the commissioner for the Ukrainian Pavilion at the Venice Biennale, and in 2010, Doroshenko was co-curator of the Busan Biennale, South Korea. In 2012, Doroshenko was a Brown Foundation research fellow at Maison de Dora Maar, Ménerbes, France.

== Works ==
- Spank the Monkey. Ed. Peter Doroshenko and Pedro Alonzo. Berlin: Gestalten Verlag, 2007. ISBN 978-90-816091-0-4.
- Private Spaces for Contemporary Art. Ed. Peter Doroshenko. Brussels: Rispoli, 2010. ISBN 978-3-89955-174-7.
- Piotr Uklanski. Ed. Peter Doroshenko. Milan: Mousse Publishing, 2014. ISBN 978-88-67491-28-5.
- David Salle, Debris. Ed. Peter Doroshenko. New York: Karma, 2016. ISBN 978-1-942607-02-1.
- Boris Mikhailov, Parliament. Ed. Peter Doroshenko. Kyiv: Rodovid Press, 2017. ISBN 978-617-7482-05-4.
- Enoc Perez: Liberty and Restraint. Ed. Peter Doroshenko. Milan: Mousse Publishing, 2018. ISBN 978-88-6749-359-3.
- Eric Fischl, If Art Could Talk. Ed. Peter Doroshenko. Milan: Mousse Publishing, 2018. ISBN 978-88-6749-332-6.
- Ross Bleckner. Ed. Peter Doroshenko. Dallas: Dallas Contemporary, 2019. ISBN 978-1-7923-1216-8.
- Art in Unexpected Places 003. Ed. Peter Doroshenko. Aspen: Aspen Skiing Company, 2020. ISBN 978-0-578-87917-8.
- Francesco Clemente: Watchtowers, Keys, Threads, Gates. Ed. Peter Doroshenko. Milan: Mousse Publishing, 2020. ISBN 978-88-6749-413-2.
- Tommo Gokita: Get Down. Ed. Peter Doroshenko. Milan: Mousse Publishing, 2021. ISBN 978-88-6749-515-3.
- Ilya and Emilia Kabakov: Paintings about Paintings. Ed. Peter Doroshenko. Berlin: Kerber Verlag, 2021. ISBN 978-37-3560-819-2.
- Liu Xiaodong: Borders. Ed. Peter Doroshenko. Milan: Mousse Publishing, 2021. ISBN 978-88-6749-412-5.
- Paulo Roversi: Birds. Ed. Peter Doroshenko. Paris: Stromboli, 2021. ISBN 978-29-5465-062-3.
- Peter Halley: Cell Grids. Ed. Peter Doroshenko. Milan: Mousse Publishing, 2022. ISBN 978-88-6749-592-4.
- Joseph Havel: Parrot Architecture. Ed. Peter Doroshenko. Milan: Mousse Publishing, 2022. ISBN 978-88-6749-595-5.
- Maria Prymachenko: Glory to Ukraine. Ed. Peter Doroshenko. Kyiv: Rodovid Press, 2023. ISBN 978-617-7482-60-3.
- Janet Sobel: Wartime. Ed. Peter Doroshenko. Kyiv: Rodovid Press, 2023. ISBN 978-617-7482-56-6.
- Alexandra Exter: The World is a Stage. Ed. Peter Doroshenko. Kyiv: Rodovid Press, 2024. ISBN 978-617-7482-66-5.
- Peter Hujar: Rialto Ed. Peter Doroshenko. Kyiv: Rodovid Press, 2023. ISBN 978-617-7482-65-8.
- He and I Were Once Ukrainians. Ed. Peter Doroshenko. Kyiv: Rodovid Press, 2025. ISBN 978-617-7482-75-7.
- Village to Modern. Ed. Peter Doroshenko. Kyiv: Rodovid Press, 2025. ISBN 978-617-7482-73-3.
- Tatlin: Kyiv. Ed. Peter Doroshenko. Kyiv: Rodovid Press, 2025. ISBN 978-617-7482-69-6.
