= David Benjamin Sherry =

American photographer (born 1981)

David B. Sherry
- Born: 1981 (age 44–45); Stony Brook, New York, U.S.
- Education: Rhode Island School of Design, Yale University
- Known for: Landscape photography

David Benjamin Sherry (born in 1981) is an American artist. Sherry's work consists primarily of large format film photography, focusing on landscape and portraiture, as well as photograms and painting, and has been exhibited in New York, Los Angeles, London, Berlin, Aspen and Moscow. He is based in Los Angeles.

== Early life and education ==
David Benjamin Sherry was born January 14, 1981, in Stony Brook, New York on the North Shore of Long Island. At the age of five his family moved to Woodstock, New York, where he was raised. Sherry received his BFA degree in Photography from Rhode Island School of Design in 2003 and an MFA degree in Photography from Yale University in 2007.

== Work ==
His work has been featured in museum and gallery exhibitions such as MoMA PS1's "2010 Greater New York," the Aspen Art Museum's "The Anxiety of Photography" in 2011, Saatchi Gallery's "Out of Focus" in 2012, LACMA's "Lost Line" exhibition in 2013, "What is a Photograph?" at the International Center for Photography in 2014. Since 2011 he has presented numerous solo exhibitions at Salon 94 gallery in New York City and Moran Bondaroff gallery in Los Angeles, CA. In 2011 he was a recipient of Rema Hort Mann Foundation Visual Arts Grant.

Sherry's work varies from landscape and studio photography, to collage and sculpture, often with a heavy focus on color. Working with analogue film and printing techniques "the use of anachronistic, primitive methods reflects a concern with craft, introducing the hand of the artist into a medium most commonly associated with mechanical reproduction." Sherry's work often merges human and natural subjects, creating images in which landscapes take on anthropomorphic qualities and the humans in them become part of the landscape, as opposed to inhabitants.

Sherry's use of vibrant monochrome color began while studying for his MFA at Yale. Working closely with master printer and photographer Richard Benson, Sherry discovered that through analog printing techniques, he could manipulate color film to chromatic extremes. For Sherry, the vibrant colors he incorporates into the work are a conduit for his intense, sometimes mystical connections to the natural world. His exhibition "Astral Desert", at Salon 94 gallery in New York City explored the topography of the desert and American West through multiple processes pushing photography to a "chromatic extreme." In the exhibitions "Climate Vortex Sutra" and "Paradise Fire" Sherry's work continued to explore themes of queer landscape, as well as climate change and its effects on the American landscape.

Sherry's insertion of queer themes into the trajectory of modernist photography gives us space to stop and consider the erotic body of the image itself... In Deep Blue Sea Rising, Oregon, 2014, for example Sherry's vision of the American landscape breaks down into the tactile skin of the sea, only to be brought back together by swaths of pigment.

— William J. Simmons, Artforum

In the series American Monuments, Sherry used his signature colored images to depict the spirit and intrinsic value of America's threatened system of national monuments, not only conveying the beauty of these important and ecologically diverse sites, but also shedding light upon the plight of the perennially exploited landscape of the American West.

In the series Paradise Fire, Sherry presented works without the signature overlaid color of his previous landscapes, opting for the natural appearance of the scene, and often depicting the interaction of humans and the environment.

Perhaps this turn to a kind of “straight” photography stems from a realization that landscape indelibly bears the traces of human presence, mostly ruinous, and that this presence is deleterious enough to puncture the possibility of autonomy posited by Adams and other photographers of yesteryear. Adams avoided photographing people on the trails next to him and thus maintained a fantasy of natural preserve that he spent his later years defending as a form of social service. In Sherry’s photographs, people do appear, taking selfies in meadows or throwing themselves from bridges, tethered to bungee cords. In Swingarm City a.k.a. Caineville, Utah, June 2015, film crews work amid props and a green-screen ramp. Somewhat more elegantly, in what might also be his most potent rejoinder to Adams and the tradition he represents, Sherry shows Yosemite’s El Capitán dotted with climbers— specks on the enormous rock. In this new body of work, Sherry seems to veer toward a sort of humanism necessarily personal enough to incorporate identity but also capacious enough to allow for the possibility of exceeding it, the works offering themselves to a world that, soon enough, none of us will inhabit.

— Suzanne Hudson, Artforum

He has published three books of photographs, the first, titled "It's Time" in 2009 with Damiani, a second book titled "Quantum Light" released in 2012 with Damiani and Salon 94 and a third, titled "Earth Changes" released in 2015 with Mörel Books. His work is held in permanent collections at the Wexner Center of the Arts, Columbus, OH; Los Angeles County Museum of Art, Los Angeles, CA; and the Saatchi Collection, London, UK.

== Books ==
- It's Time, Damiani (2009), ISBN 978-8862080934
- Quantum Light, Damiani/Salon 94 (2012), ISBN 978-8862082136
- Earth Changes, Morel Books (2015), ISBN 978-1907071430
- American Monuments, Radius (2019), ISBN 978-1942185611
- Pink Genesis, Aperture (2022), ISBN 978-1683952428
