= Kristin Oppenheim =

American installation artist

- Born: 1959 (age 66–67); Honolulu, Hawaii
- Known for: Installation Art, Sound Art, Conceptual Art

Kristin Oppenheim (born 1959) is an American artist who lives and works in New York City. She is best known for her installation art based in sound, film, and performance. Oppenheim’s work explores connections between musical rounds, film loops, and choreography. Since the early 1990s, she has been making poetic works that often explore time and memory.

In 2021, she released her first vinyl LP anthology, “Night Run: Collected Sound Works 1992-1995”, followed by her second vinyl LP release, “Voices Fill My Head: Collected Sound Works 1993-1999”. Both compilation records were released on her Berlin based label, INFO.

== Early life and education ==
Kristin Oppenheim was born in 1959 in Honolulu, Hawaii to conceptual artist Dennis Oppenheim and painter Karen Marie Cackett. During the 1980s, Oppenheim was a member of the experimental post punk rock band, Minimal Man, where she first began her early work in performance and film while living in San Francisco. She received a BA from San Francisco State University in 1984, and moved to New York where she received an MFA from Hunter College in 1989.

== Work ==
Oppenheim’s work is often characterized as performative. Early in her career, she would present sound works in white rooms that were entirely empty except for the physical presence of the sound equipment itself. She sang fragments of pop songs a cappella, or recited poetry that she had written or found, and then presented recordings of them in these minimal settings. Eventually, her installations came to incorporate stage lighting, "as if to underscore the sense of a performance, yet one from which the artist/performer is physically removed."

Her first sound installation, Shake Me, was exhibited in the group show, One Leading To Another, at New York’s 303 Gallery in 1992. The work consisted of a twenty-two second tape recording, of the artist repeating the words “shake me,” rendered in a soft, warbling voice. A critic for Artforum described the work as emotionally massive. "With each repetition, the pair of words shift from command to plea, accusation to dare.” She gained international recognition in 1993 with her first solo exhibition, Shiver, at Studio Guenzani in Milan, and later that year, at the 45th Venice Biennale’s group exhibition, Aperto’93. Both sound works were recordings of her repetitive, half-sung and half-spoken a cappella vocals that Italian Flash Art critic Emanuela De Cecco characterized as “a vital, unfiltered expression of the soul and the story.”

Oppenheim’s debut solo show, Sail On Sailor at 303 Gallery followed in 1994. The New York Times critic Roberta Smith described her rendition of the Brian Wilson song as having a “soothing, almost hypnotic” effect on the audience. "There's the strange emotional pull of Ms. Oppenheim's voice, words and rhythms. They conjure an extreme kind of solitude, that of a teen-ager in her bedroom, or perhaps even an inmate in an asylum, a solitude in which the sound of one's own voice is the only comfort.”

Sail On Sailor has since been exhibited in multiple venues, including The New Museum, New York (2013), The International Biennial of Contemporary Art, Cartagena de Indias, Columbia (2014), The D Museum, Seoul, Korea (2020), and the Fondation Vincent van Gogh Arles, France (2021).

In an interview for Bomb magazine, Oppenheim described her interest in working with sound and choreography. “All my compositions are written with choreography in mind: how the audience moves through the space, and how they spend time in the space…It’s an immersive experience for the audience, and over time, as you listen, the composition becomes more and more spatial.”

In 1995 she premiered her film installation, Sally Go Round, in the group show, Threshold: Ten American Sculptors, curated by Dan Cameron. The exhibition was held at the Fundação de Serralves in Porto, Portugal, where each of the ten artists were asked to create a work for inside the villa and outside in the surrounding gardens. Oppenheim’s film was played in a loop, and featured the artist twisting and turning through an uneasy sleep. Her sound track, Sally Go Round, was played continuously, and her voice could be heard both inside the villa and outside in the garden. A critic for Artforum wrote, “The exquisite poetic sensitivity of Oppenheim’s work encourages us to wander through the house and the garden, to surrender to a place marked by that unmistakable saudade (yearning) that is the Portuguese form of melancholy.”

Sally Go Round has also been exhibited at Studio Guenzani, Milan (1995), and at the Vienna Secession (2015).

Oppenheim’s compositions often use the musical form of the round, giving her sound installations “a sense of hypnotic, circuitous motion." This idea is also reflected in her lyrical theme of Sally Go Round.

Oppenheim’s 1996 installation, Hey Joe, featured a dark room with a pair of moving theatrical spotlights and the sound of her singing a capella the opening lines of the classic Jimmy Hendrix’s song "Hey Joe" repeatedly. “Hey Joe, Where you going with that gun in your hand?” A critic for Time Out wrote that Oppenheim had “transformed the song from the glorification of a tragically wronged male outlaw into a kind of hymn to his female victim.”

Hey Joe was first exhibited at 303 Gallery in 1996. The installation has since been exhibited in multiple venues including Witte de With, Rotterdam (1998), The CCAC Institute, SanFrancisco (1999), MACBA, Barcelona (2011), Fundación “la Caixa”, Barcelona (2017), and the Museo de Valls, Tarragona, Spain (2022).

Oppenheim’s sound works often "have a somber or melancholic quality." They imply loss; as if the artist is singing about someone who has left. A critic for Soundohm characterized Hey Joe as deeply personal. “The artist's treatment of the song rides a striking line between a profound sense of intimacy, as though Joe was known to her, and a reduction toward abstraction.”

In 2022 Oppenheim premiered her film installation, Bang Bang, at 303 Gallery in New York. Also in 2022, she inaugurated her solo exhibition, She Had A Heavy Day, at greengrassi in London, featuring a rotating playlist of eight a cappella sound works that she recorded in the 1990s. Each day of the exhibition, a different work from the playlist was presented to the audience. A record release party for Oppenheim’s vinyl LP, Voices fill my head, was held at greengrassi on the opening night of the exhibition.

=== Vinyl Anthologies ===
Two double-LP vinyl anthologies of Oppenheim’s early sound works, Night Run: Collected Sound Works 1992-1995 (2021) and Voices Fill My Head: Collected Sound Works 1993-1999 (2022), were released on the Berlin-based record label INFO, founded by interdisciplinary artist Reece Cox. Both compilations included a number of songs that were originally introduced in her installation projects, including “Hey Joe,” “Tap Your Shoes,” “Sail on Sailor,” “Cry Me a River” and “She Had a Heavy Day.” A review in Artforum described Oppenheim’s singing on the eight tracks of Night Run as “hushed, hypnotic, and almost impossibly minimal, singing with herself, by herself", linking her long a capella rounds back to the musique concrète tape experiments of Halim El-Dabh and the electronic works of avant garde composer Robert Ashley. A critic for Soundohm commented that Night Run and Voices Fill My Head weave “a fascinating intersection between conceptual art practice, minimalism, tape music, and song, producing something as direct and innocent, as it is rigorous and clean, channeling a vast range of subjects that shift between the literal and the abstract.”

== Exhibitions ==
Oppenheim has exhibited her work internationally in such institutions as the Whitney Museum of American Art, New York; the MACBA Museu d’Art Contemporani de Barcelona; the San Francisco Museum of Modern Art; and the Centre Georges Pompidou in Paris. Her work was included in the exhibition Aperto ’93 at the 45th Venice Biennale, at the 46th Venice Biennale, and at the International Biennial of Contemporary Art, in Cartagena de Indias, Columbia in 2014. Among others, solo exhibitions of Oppenheim’s work include “She Had A Heavy Day” at greengrassi, London (2022), “Bang Bang” at 303 Gallery, New York (2022), “Kristin Oppenheim”, at MAMCO Musée d’Art Modern et Contemporain, in Geneva, (2019) and “Echo” at the Vienna Secession. (2015).

Oppenheim is represented by greengrassi, London, and 303 Gallery, New York.

== Collections ==
Kristin Oppenheim’s work is included in public collections of the Art Foundation Mallorca Collection; the Centre Georges Pompidou, Paris; the FRAC Des Pays de la Loire, Carquefou, France; the MACBA Museu d’Art Contemporani de Barcelona; MAMCO Museum d’art Modern et Contemporain, Geneva; the Museum of Modern Art, New York; the San Francisco Museum of Modern Art; and the Whitney Museum of American Art, in New York.
