= Pierre Soulages =

French painter, engraver and sculptor (1919–2022)

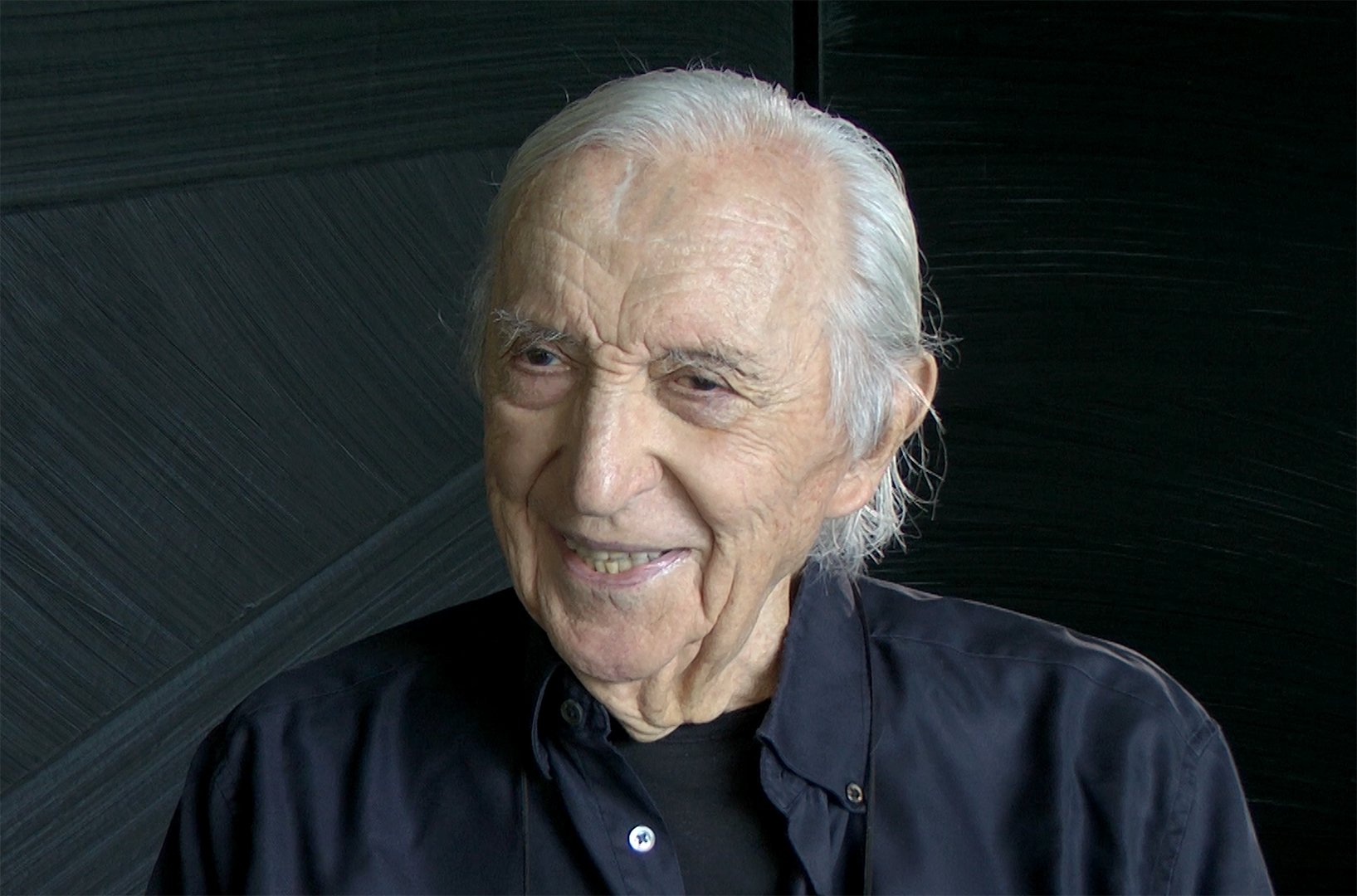
- Soulages in 2019
- Born: Pierre Jean Louis Germain Soulages; 24 December 1919; Rodez, France
- Died: 25 October 2022 (aged 102); Nîmes, France
- Occupation: Painter
- Spouse: Colette Llaurens (m. 1942)
- Awards: Carnegie Prize; Praemium Imperiale

Pierre Jean Louis Germain Soulages (French: [sulaʒ]; Occitan: Pèire Solatges; 24 December 1919 – 25 October 2022) was a French painter, printmaker, and sculptor. In 2014, President François Hollande of France described him as "the world's greatest living artist". His works are held by leading museums of the world, and there is a museum dedicated to his art in his hometown of Rodez.

Soulages is known as "the painter of black", owing to his interest in the colour "both as a colour and a non-colour. When light is reflected on black, it transforms and transmutes it. It opens a mental field all its own." He saw light as a work material; striations of the black surface of his paintings enable him to reflect light, allowing the black to come out of darkness and into brightness, thus becoming a luminous colour.

Soulages produced 104 stained-glass windows for the Romanesque architecture of the Abbey Church of Sainte-Foy in Conques from 1987 to 1994. He received international awards, and the Louvre in Paris held a retrospective of his works on the occasion of his centenary.

== Early life and family ==
Soulages was born in Rodez, Aveyron, on 24 December 1919. His father, Amans, was a carriage maker who ran a hunting and fishing shop. He died when Pierre was five years old. Pierre was raised by his older sister Antoinette and their mother, Aglaé Zoé Julie (Corp) Soulages. As a child, he was interested in the area's menhirs, in Celtic carvings in the local museum, and also in the Romanesque architecture of the Abbey Church of Sainte-Foy in Conques. He dressed in all black, and his mother disliked it.

== Early career ==
Inspired by the art of Paul Cézanne and Pablo Picasso, Soulages began studies at the École nationale supérieure des beaux-arts in Paris, but soon dropped out because he was disappointed by the traditional style.

After wartime military service, he studied further at the Fine Arts School of Montpellier. He opened a studio in Courbevoie, Paris, painting in "complete abstraction", with black as the dominant colour, and experimenting with walnut oil. His first exhibition was at the Salon des Indépendants in 1947. He also worked as a designer of stage sets. He exhibited at the Venice Biennale in 1954, and in New York City the same year, gaining recognition in the United States. Betty Parsons Gallery showed his work in New York in 1949. In 1950, Leo Castelli organized an exhibition at Sidney Janis. In 1954, Soulages began showing at Samuel Kootz. His works were included in the two major exhibitions of European artists, Younger European Painters at the Solomon R Guggenheim Museum (1953) and The New Decade: 22 European Painters and Sculptors at the Museum of Modern Art (1955) in New York. In 1979, Soulages was made a Foreign Honorary Member of the American Academy of Arts and Letters.

== Later career ==
From 1987 to 1994, he produced 104 stained-glass windows for the Abbey of Sainte-Foy in Conques, prepared by around 700 tests at a small factory near Münster, Germany. A gallerist reflected on the windows in the context of his paintings:

He studied the way that light wouldn't cross through the stained glass, but would be fractionally fragmented, exploded through the stained glass. So when you are in Conques and you see the light coming through these stained-glass panels, how the light hits the glass and then comes in and the harmonious explosion inside the church, it's beyond religious. And that's what he was trying to achieve with his black paintings, to capture whatever you give them, but they're reflected in a completely independent way. It puts you in front of the void, in front of fullness and emptiness, in front of strength and vulnerability. It has this tension, and that is what it was to know Soulages.

Soulages was the first living artist to have been invited to exhibit at the state Hermitage Museum of St. Petersburg and later with the Tretyakov Gallery of Moscow (2001).

In 2007, the Musée Fabre of Montpellier devoted an entire room to Soulages, presenting a donation he made to the city. It included twenty paintings dating from 1951 to 2006, among which were major works from the 1960s, two large "plus-black" works from the 1970s, and several large polyptychs. A retrospective was held at the Centre National d'Art et de Culture Georges Pompidou from October 2009 to March 2010. In 2010, the Museum of Mexico City presented a retrospective of paintings that also included an interview-video with the artist.

In 2014, the Musée Soulages opened in Soulages' hometown of Rodez, as a place to permanently display his works and to house temporary contemporary exhibitions. Soulages and his wife donated 900 works. The paintings represent all stages of his work, from post-war oils to a phase of work he calls Outrenoir. It was the most complete display of work from his first 30 years. Some space in the museum is always reserved for exhibitions of other contemporary artists, as Soulages had wished from the beginning.

In 2014, Soulages presented fourteen recent works in his first American exhibition in 10 years, at Dominique Lévy and Galerie Perrotin, New York. In September 2019, the Lévy Gorvy Gallery in New York held a major exhibition ahead of the retrospective at the Louvre Museum in December celebrating his 100th birthday.

On 17 November 2021, his Peinture 195 x 130 cm, 4 août 1961, was auctioned for $20.2M, an auction record for the artist.

== Artistic practice ==
17 December 1966 (1966), Honolulu Museum of Art

Soulages said, "My instrument is not black but the light reflected from the black." Naming his own practice Outrenoir (Beyond Black), the paintings he produces are known for their endless black depth, created by playing with the light reflected off of the texture of the paint. Knowing that he needed a new term to define the way that he worked, Soulages invented 'Outrenoir' to define his practice; in a 2014 interview he explained the definition of the term, "Outrenoir doesn't exist in English; the closest is "beyond black." In French, you say "outre-Manche," "beyond the Channel," to mean England or "outre-Rhin," "beyond the Rhine," to mean Germany. In other words, "beyond black" is a different country from black."

The infatuation Soulages had with black began long before his investigations with 'Outrenoir' at the age of 60. Initially inspired by his interest in the prehistoric and his desire to retreat to something more pure, primal, and deliberately stripped of any other connotations, he explains his fascination with the colour black: "During thousands of years, men went underground, in the absolute black of grottoes, to paint with black." "I made these because I found that the light reflected by the black surface elicits certain emotions in me. These aren't monochromes. The fact that light can come from the colour which is supposedly the absence of light is already quite moving, and it is interesting to see how this happens."

Applying the paint in thick layers, Soulages' painting technique includes using objects such as spoons, tiny rakes and bits of rubber to work away at the painting, often making scraping, digging or etching movements depending on whether he wants to evoke a smooth or rough surface. The texture that is then produced either absorbs or rejects light, breaking up the surface of the painting by disrupting the uniformity of the black. He often used bold cuts in vertical and horizontal lines, the crevasses and forms created by using angles and contours. In his recent work from 2013 to 2014, Soulages began to explicitly vary the pigment used in the paint, mixing matte and glossy types of black as well as hardened densities of black pigment. Preferring to suspend the paintings like walls, he uses wires to hang them in the middle of the room, "I always liked paintings to be walls rather than windows. When we see a painting on a wall, it's a window, so I often put my paintings in the middle of the space to make a wall. A window looks outside, but a painting should do the opposite—it should look inside of us".

Instead of having titles, Soulages' paintings are uniformly named as "Peinture" (transl.: Painting), followed by size and date of production. 17 December 1966 from 1966, in the collection of the Honolulu Museum of Art, demonstrates the artist's boldly brushed black-on-white canvases. His works had to be hung without frames in exhibitions.

== Personal life ==
While at the Fine Arts School of Montpellier, Soulages met Colette Llaurens (born 1921). They were married on 24 October 1942. The couple had no children. In 2017, they permanently moved to their summer retreat in Sète.

Soulages died in Nîmes on 25 October 2022, less than two months before his 103rd birthday, and was survived by his wife. He had marked their 80th wedding anniversary the day before his death.

== Collections ==
Collections of works by Soulages are held by many museums, including:

- Centre Georges Pompidou (Paris)
- Honolulu Museum of Art
- Montreal Museum of Fine Arts
- Musée d'Art Moderne de la Ville de Paris
- Musée Soulages (Rodez)
- Museum of Modern Art (New York)
- Museum of Modern Art (Rio de Janeiro)
- National Gallery of Art (Washington, D.C.)
- Solomon R. Guggenheim Museum (New York)
- Tate Gallery (London)
- Tehran Museum of Contemporary Art

== Publications and monographs ==
Exhibitions of art by Soulages were accompanied by publications including:

Year	Title (publisher or gallery)	Editors and contributors
2014	Soulages in America (Dominique Lévy Gallery, New York)	Texts by Philippe Ungar, Harry Cooper, Sean Sweeney, Dominique Lévy
2011	Soulages l'oeuvre imprimé (Bibliothèque Nationale de France/ Musée Soulages, Paris)	Edited by Pierre Encrevé, Marie-Cécile Miessner
2011	Pierre Soulages (Martin-Gropius-Bau, Berlin / Hirmer, Munich)	Essays by Hans Belting, Yve-Alain Bois, Pierre Encrevé, Alfred Pacquement, Serge Guilbaut, Bernard de Montferrand, Alain Seban, Joachim Sartorius, Gereon Sievernich, Hans-Ulrich Obrist; edited by Pierre Encrevé, Alfred Paquement
2010	Verre cartons des vitraux de Conques (Musée Fabre, Montpellier)	Essays by Pierre Soulages, Jean-Dominique Fleury, Benoît Decron
2010	Pierre Soulages (Bernard Jacobson Gallery, London)	Essays by John Yau and Mel Gooding
2009	Soulages, le temps du papier. (Cercle d'Art, Paris / Musée d'Art Moderne, Contemporain de Strasbourg)	Text by Michel Ragon, Estelle Pietrzyk, Gilbert Dupuis
2009	Soulages (Centre Pompidou, Paris)	Essays by Alain Seban, Alfred Pacquement, Pierre Encrevé, Serge Guilbaut, Yve-Alain Bois, Guitermie Maldonado, Annie Claustres, Harry Cooper, Hans Belting, Isabelle Ewig, Éric de Chassey, Hans Ulrich Obrist; Edited by Pierre Encrevé, Alfred Pacquement
2007	Pierre Soulages au Musée Fabre, Parcours d'un accrochage. (Interprint, Montpellier)	Photos by Vincent Cunillère; Essays by Georges Frêche, Michel Hilaire, Emmanuel Nebout, Laurence Javal, Olivier Brochet, Yves Larbiou, Dan McEnroe, Thierry Dieudonnat, Pierre Susini, Claude Cougnenc, Pierre Encrevé
2006	Pierre Soulages. Painting the light. (Sammlung Essl, Klosterneuburg / Vienna)	Essays by Karlheinz Essl, Andrea Rygg Karberg
2001	Soulages – Lumière du noir (Paris-Musées, Paris)	Essays by Mikhaïl Piotrovsky, Suzanne Pagé, Albert Kosténévitch, Pierre Encrevé, JeanClaude Marcadé; Preface by Vladimir Yakovlev, Bertrand Delanoë, mayor of Paris
1999	Pierre Soulages, Célébration de la lumière. (Skira-Le Seuil, Paris / Musée des Beaux-Arts, Berne)	Essays by Sandor Kuthy, Pierre Soulages
1998	Soulages, L'oeuvre complet, Peintures III, 1979–1997. (Seuil, Paris)	Text by Pierre Encrevé
1997	Pierre Soulages, Malerei als Farbe und Licht, Retrospektive 1946–1997. (Deichtorhallen, Hamburg)	Essays by Zdenek Felix, Robert Fleck, Charles Juliet
1996	Soulages, Noir lumière. (Musée d'Art Moderne de Paris)	Essays by Suzanne Pagé, Jean-Louis Andral, Pierre Encrevé, Robert Fleck, Donald Kuspit, William Rubin
1996	Soulages (Flammarion, Paris: pp. 87–149)	Interview with the artist by Bernard Ceysson
1994	Pierre Soulages: une retrospective (Taipei Fine Arts Museum / National Museum of China, Beijing)	Essays by Huang Kuang-nan, Alfred Pacquement, Jean-Paul Réau, François Marcel Plaisant
1994	Les vitraux de Soulages (Seuil, Paris)	Georges Duby, Christian Heck
1993	Pierre Soulages: une retrospective (Musée National d'Art Contemporain, Séoul)	Essays by Young-Bang Lim, Alfred Pacquement, Bernard Prague
1992	Pierre Soulages, polyptyques 1979–1991 (Maison des Arts Georges Pompidou, Cajarc)	Essays by Pierre Daix, Pierre Encrevé, Claire Stoullig
1991	Soulages, peintures récentes (Museum Moderner Kunst Stiftung Ludwig, Vienna)	Essays by Lorand Hegyi, Alfred Pacquement
1990	Polyptyques (Louvre, Paris)	Text by Isabelle Monod-Fontaine
1989	Soulages: 40 jahre Malerei (in German, Fridericianum, Kassel / Cantz Verlag, Stuttgart)	Text by Veit Loers, Bernard Ceysson
1989	Soulages: 40 ans de peinture (in French, Musée d'Arts de Nantes)	Essays by Henry-Claude Cousseau, Veit Loers
1989	Soulages: 40 anos de pintura (in Spanish, Institut Valencià d'Art Modern)	Essays by Bernard Ceysson, Veit Loers
1987	Nous avons visité le Musée d'Orsay avec Pierre Soulages (L'Evénement du Jeudi, Paris: pp. 82–84)	Interview with the artist by Jean-Louis Pradel
1987	Pierre Soulages (Musée Saint-Pierre Art Contemporain, Lyon / Hans Thoma-Gesellschaft, Reutlingen)	Essays by Georges Duby, Pierre Encrevé, Henri Meschonnic, Werner Meyer, Thierry Raspail, Clément Rosset
1984	Soulages (Seibu Museum of Art, Tokyo)	Essays by Taka Ashido Okada, Alfred Pacquement
1980	Soulages, peintures récentes (Musee National d´Art Moderne, Paris / Musée du Parc de la Boverie, Liège)	Essays by Pontus Hulten, Alfred Pacquement
1976	Soulages (Musée d'Art et d'Industrie, Saint-Etienne: p. 5–32, 42)	Interview with the artist by Bernard Ceysson
1975	L'aventure de l'art moderne (1): Pierre Soulages (Galerie Jardin des Arts, Paris: September, p. 150)	Interview with the artist by André Parinaud
1974	Soulages, peintures, gravures (Musée Dynamique, Dakar / Fundaçào Calouste Gulbenkian, Lisbon)	Text by Léopold Sédar Senghor

== Honours and awards ==
Awards that Soulages received included:

- Carnegie Prize (United States, 1964)
- Grand Prix for Painting (Paris, 1975)
- Rembrandt Award (Germany, 1976)
- Foreign Honorary Member of the American Academy of Arts and Letters (1979)
- Grand prix national de peinture (France, 1986)
- Praemium Imperiale for painting (Japan, 1992)
- Austrian Decoration for Science and Art (2006)
- Prix Julio González (Valencia, 2006)
- Grand Cross of the Legion of Honour (Paris, 2015)
- Grand prix du rayonnement français (France, 2019)
