= Lisa Brice =

South African artist

- Born: 1968 (age 57–58); Cape Town
- Occupation: Artist
- Known for: Between This and That (2017)

Lisa Brice (born 1968) is a South African painter and visual artist from Cape Town. She lives in London and cites some of her influences as her experiences growing up in South Africa during a time of political upheaval, and from time spent living and working in Trinidad.

== Biography ==
Brice was born and raised in Cape Town, South Africa and studied at Michaelis School of Fine Art in Cape Town, graduating in 1990. From 1988—1991 Brice worked as printmaking assistant to artist Sue Williamson. She came to London in 1998 to take up a residency at Gasworks Gallery and later settled in the capital. Her paintings are inspired by her early life in South Africa as well as her life in London and time spent in Trinidad over the past 20 years.

Brice started out working with printing, photography, video and other mixed media. After moving to the UK, she began to work predominantly in oils and canvas or paper and is now better known as a painter.

Also in the late 1990s Brice began spending time working and in residence in Port of Spain, Trinidad, where she met and collaborated with other artists such as Peter Doig and Chris Ofili. Together they set up CCA7 (Caribbean Contemporary Arts).

Duro Olowu has described her as one of the "quiet masters of composition and technique".

== Exhibitions ==
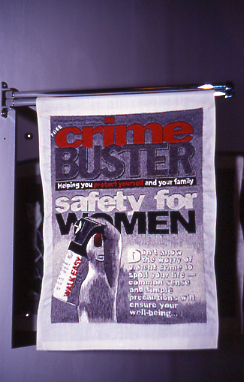
Lisa Brice, Dakar biennale 2002

Since 1993 Brice has had over 20 solo exhibitions in South Africa and around Europe, and almost 100 group exhibitions around the world.

After graduating, Brice's first show featured images drawn from Thailand's sex industry signage, which was taken up by the Frank Hanel Gallery in Germany and shown across Europe. Subsequent early mixed media exhibitions featured themes such as racial tension, violence and crime in South Africa.

In 2016 Duro Olowu included Brice in Making and Unmaking exhibition at the Camden Arts Centre in London. The following year Salon 94 gallery in New York exhibited Boundary Girl, an exhibition of large canvasses and small gouaches, the smaller works having been displayed earlier that year in London.

Brice had two solo exhibitions at Stephen Friedman Gallery, London. In 2017 her first exhibition was dedicated to paintings on paper. In 2019 Brice presented a solo exhibition of new paintings and works on paper following her highly acclaimed solo exhibition at Tate Britain in 2018. The exhibition was accompanied by a booklet and commissioned essay by Laura Smith, Curator at Whitechapel Gallery, London.

In 2018 Brice exhibited at Tate Britain as part of Art Now, exhibitions for new and emerging artists. The work featured "recast female subjects from art historical paintings, photographs and the media into new environments, imbuing them with a newfound sense of self possession." Many of the paintings show the women rendered in a rich blue paint which echoes Brice's Trinidadian experiences of carnival, in which revellers known as 'blue devils' paint themselves blue for anonymity. Art Now included two new paintings not previously exhibited, one based on John Everett Millais's Ophelia (Millais) with Ophelia standing upright holding a cigarette, the other based on Parting at Morning by William Rothenstein with the emaciated model repainted, filled out, also smoking a cigarette. The exhibition was well received by the British press who praised Brice for "an important reclamation of the female body". Brice's work was included in the 2022 exhibition Women Painting Women at the Modern Art Museum of Fort Worth.

Her work is held in collections around the world, including the Smithsonian National Museum of African Art, Johannesburg Art Gallery, The Whitworth, the High Commission of South Africa, London and the private collection of Sindika Dokolo.
