= Charles Feinstein =

South African and British economic historian

Charles Hilliard Feinstein, FBA (18 March 1932 – 27 November 2004) was a noted South African and British economic historian. He was born in Johannesburg, received his early education at Parktown Boys' High School and studied at Witwatersrand University and Cambridge University where he completed his doctorate. In 1958, he joined the Department of Applied Economics at Cambridge. During this period, other notable economic historians such as Phyllis Deane and W. A. Cole were hard at work, extending data series on the UK economy back into previous centuries. In 1972, Feinstein published his magnum opus, National Income, Expenditure and Output of the United Kingdom, 1855–1965, which has since come to be seen as the standard reference work on UK economic data for the period. The Times said of this book:

Although Feinstein undertook many more investigations, this was perhaps his crowning achievement. Of the several similar projects undertaken in different countries, for example the American, Canadian, Australian and German initiatives, it is fair to say that the one that Feinstein brought into being was the most elegantly reasoned, organised and presented. It was all the more remarkable for being the work largely of one man.

A fellow of Clare College, Cambridge, Feinstein was also associated with the universities of York, Harvard, Oxford and Cape Town in the course of a distinguished academic career. He was Chichele Professor of Economic History at All Souls College, Oxford for many years, and was instrumental in the creation of the Oxford Masters (MSc and MPhil) in Social and Economic History. The Feinstein Prize, endowed in his honour, is awarded each year to the student on these courses who writes the best thesis.

He is also the author of a history of South Africa entitled An economic history of South Africa: conquest, discrimination and development, published posthumously by Cambridge University Press in 2005.
