= Dick Lord =

Richard Stanley Lord
- Born: 20 June 1936; Johannesburg, South Africa
- Died: 26 October 2011 (aged 75)
- Military career
- Allegiance: South Africa
- Branch: Fleet Air Arm; South African Air Force
- Rank: Brigadier General
- Nickname: Dick
- Commands: 1 Squadron SAAF

Brigadier General Richard Stanley 'Dick' Lord (20 June 1936 – 26 October 2011) from Johannesburg, South Africa was a South African Air Force and Royal Navy Fleet Air Arm pilot.

He was born in Johannesburg and attended Parktown Boys' High School. He joined the Royal Navy in 1958 and trained as an engineer at RNEC Manadon, before he qualified as a fighter pilot in 1959. Whilst serving in the Royal Navy Fleet Air Arm, he flew Sea Venom and Sea Vixen aircraft and qualified as an Air Weapons Instructor.

In 1968 Lord did a two-year exchange tour with the US Navy at NAS Miramar flying A-4 Skyhawks and F-4 Phantoms. There he wrote the USN Air Combat Manoeuvring Manual and his training methods were instrumental in the creation of 'Top Gun' in 1969. His theory was put into practice by other British pilots on exchange, or lent from UK-based training units, such as 764 NAS Air Weapons Instructors (AWI) Course at RNAS Lossiemouth. He completed tours of air warfare instruction flying Hunters from the naval air stations at Lossiemouth, Scotland and Brawdy, Wales.

He returned to South Africa in the early 1970s and joined the South African Air Force, flying Impalas, Sabres and Mirage Ills. During the Border War, he commanded No 1 Squadron, flying Mirage F1AZs. His last tour of duty was as commander of the Air Force Command Post. He was mentioned in Dispatches and awarded a Distinguished Service Cross for his role in the very successful rescue of all 581 people from the ill-fated cruise-liner Oceanos in 1991. Before retiring in 1994, he was tasked to organise the fly-past at the inauguration of Nelson Mandela as President of South Africa.

Upon retiring he took up a very active and successful career in writing, documenting his military career in a number of popular books.

- Fire, Flood, and Ice: Search and Rescue Operations of the South African Air Force (1998)
- Vlamgat: The Story of the Mirage F1 in the South African Air Force (2000)
- From Tailhooker to Mudmover: An Aviation Career in the Royal Naval Fleet Air Arm, United States Navy and South African Air Force (2003)
- From Fledgling to Eagle: the South African Air Force during the Border War (2008)
- Standby! South African Air Force Search and Rescue (2010) (an updated edition of Fire, Flood and Ice).

Brigadier General Dick Lord died on 26 October 2011 after a long illness.
