= Salon 94 =

Art gallery in Manhattan, New York

- Established: 2003; 23 years ago
- Location: East 94th Street, New York City, and various other sites
- Coordinates: 40°47′10.2″N 73°57′21.69″W
- Type: Art gallery
- Owner: Jeanne Greenberg Rohatyn
- Website: salon94.com

Salon 94 is a New York-based contemporary art gallery owned by Jeanne Greenberg Rohatyn.

== History ==
=== East 94th Street ===
The gallery opened in 2003 in the Carnegie Hill neighborhood on New York City’s Upper East Side as an integral part of Jeanne Greenberg Rohatyn’s home. Designed by architect Rafael Viñoly, the gallery features a dedicated exhibition space on the first floor and a combination living/gallery space on the second. The inaugural exhibition presented a video work by gallery artist Aïda Ruilova. Subsequent exhibitions have featured work by Betty Woodman, Maya Lin, Wangechi Mutu, Hanna Liden and Nate Lowman.

=== Salon 94 Freemans ===
In 2007, the gallery opened an additional location on New York’s Lower East Side at Freemans Alley as a dedicated exhibition space. The first exhibition featured work by gallery artist Huma Bhabha and subsequent shows have featured Lorna Simpson, Carter, Barry X Ball, Kara Hamilton and Lynda Benglis.

=== Salon 94 Bowery ===
In October 2010, the gallery opened a third location on the Bowery on New York’s Lower East Side. Located two doors down from the New Museum, the space was also designed by architect Rafael Viñoly as a dedicated exhibition venue. A prominent feature of the gallery is a 20-foot (6.1 m) LCD video screen on the outside wall broadcasting video art content to the street.

The inaugural show presented work gallery artist Liz Cohen. Subsequent shows featured Marilyn Minter, Laurie Simmons, Jon Kessler, Francesca Dimattio, Lisa Brice and David Benjamin Sherry. During the construction phase, the gallery presented T-shirt paintings by Richard Prince.

=== Salon 94 Design ===
In 2015, Salon 94 started producing exhibitions that challenged the traditions of and boundaries between fine art, functional objects, and the decorative arts. The space ran parallel to Salon 94 and is called Salon 94 Design. Artists and designers in the program's roster include Jay Sae Jung Oh, Thomas Barger, Donald Judd, Max Lab, Kueng Caputo, Rick Owens, Kate Millet, Gaetano Pesce, Gloria Kisch, Tom Sachs, amongst others.

=== East 89th Street ===
In 2019, Greenberg Rohatyn acquired three buildings that made up the former National Academy Museum on East 89th Street – a 14,000 sq ft (1,300 m^{2}) property – which will be Salon 94's new headquarters.

== Artists ==
Artists that were represented by Salon 94 included:

- Derrick Adams
- Marina Adams
- Estate of Terry Adkins
- Estate of César Baldaccini
- Amy Bessone
- Huma Bhabha
- Judy Chicago (since 2016)
- Liu Chuang
- Liz Cohen
- Estate of Jimmy DeSana
- Francesca DiMattio
- Ibrahim El-Salahi
- Sylvie Fleury
- Natalie Frank (since 2019)
- Katy Grannan
- Lyle Ashton Harris (since 2017)
- Jon Kessler
- Takuro Kuwata
- Philippe Malouin
- Marilyn Minter
- Estate of Carlo Mollino
- Takeshi Murata
- Jayson Musson
- Ruby Neri (since 2018)
- Rick Owens
- Carlos Rolón/DZINE
- David Benjamin Sherry
- Warlimpirrnga Tjapaltjarri
- Betty Woodman
