= Dominique Lévy =

Swiss art dealer

- Born: Dominique Astrid Lévy; June 1967 (age 59)
- Education: University of Geneva
- Occupations: Art dealer and gallerist
- Known for: Lévy Gorvy Gallery, LGDR
- Partner: Dorothy Berwin (2001 - 2019)
- Children: 2

Dominique Astrid Lévy (born June 1967) is a Swiss art dealer, and co-founder and partner, with Brett Gorvy, of Lévy Gorvy Dayan, a gallery with offices in New York City, London, Switzerland, Hong Kong and Paris.

== Early life ==
Lévy was born in June 1967, in Lausanne, Switzerland. Her mother was born in Belgium and was an art collector. Her father, a cotton merchant, left Egypt in 1956 after Gamal Abdel Nasser came to power.

She attended Art Basel at the age of three and organized her first exhibition when she was 18.

Lévy studied art history and politics at the University of Geneva and received a BA in political science and an MA in sociology of art. During college, she worked as an actress and a clown, performing at parties.

== Career ==
In 1987, Lévy completed her first internship for Christie's in New York City. When she came back to Switzerland, she was hired by Simon de Pury to work at Sotheby's where she worked for four years. Afterwards, she worked with French art dealer Daniel Malingue on the opening of his gallery, and followed his co-director, Simon Studer, in the creation of an art curation business. Then she joined the team of London's art dealer Anthony d'Offay. In 1999, headhunted by François Pinault, Lévy founded and was the international director of the private sales department at Christie's in New York.

In 2003, Lévy founded Dominique Lévy Fine Art, an art advisory service with a focus on building long-term relationships with collectors.

=== L&M Arts, 2005–2013 ===
In August 2005, Lévy co-founded L&M Arts with Robert Mnuchin, which was based in New York and Los Angeles. The bi-coastal gallery provided client services and organized exhibitions of modern and postwar art, as well as new work by such artists as David Hammons and Paul McCarthy.

=== Dominique Lévy Gallery, 2013–2017 ===
In September 2013, Dominique Lévy Gallery opened its Manhattan space with the exhibition Audible Presence: Lucio Fontana, Yves Klein, Cy Twombly, which was accompanied by the first public performance in New York of Yves Klein's seminal Monotone Silence Symphony.

In October 2014, Dominique Lévy expanded to London, opening a location at historic 22 Old Bond Street, close to the Royal Academy of Arts in the city's Mayfair district. She co-curated an exhibition of Pierre Soulages in New York in collaboration with Emmanuel Perrotin.

In 2015, her galleries exhibited Gerhard Richter's color charts, miniatures of Alexander Calder, Gego's work.

=== Lévy Gorvy, 2017–2021 ===
In 2017, Lévy partnered with art dealer Brett Gorvy, former chairman and international head of post-war and contemporary art at Christie's and they co-founded Levy Gorvy with spaces in New York, London and Hong Kong. In 2020, the gallery added a Paris space.

In 2019, for the 100th birthday of Pierre Soulages, Lévy Gorvy notably organized an exhibition ahead of his retrospective at the Musee du Louvre.

The gallery currently represented the estates of Yves Klein, Roman Opalka, Germaine Richier and Carol Rama (since 2016) in the United States, as well as artists Enrico Castellani, Boris Mikhailov, Frank Stella, Pierre Soulages, and Günther Uecker. From 2017 until 2020, it also worked with the estate of François Morellet.

=== LGDR ===
In August 2021, Lévy Gorvy announced plans to join forces with Jeanne Greenberg Rohatyn and Amalia Dayan.

=== Lévy Gorvy Dayan ===
Two years later, in August 2023, Jeanne Greenberg Rohatyn announced that she would be leaving the partnership to reopen Salon 94. The gallery would continue operations under the banner of Lévy Gorvy Dayan.

=== Controversies ===
The three dealers wrote a response joint statement in Artforum to an open letter that a number of artists, writers, and other cultural producers made for the need of art institutions to speak out on Israel’s airstrikes on Gaza. The original letter did not mention Palestine's attack on October 7 that killed 1,200 Israelis. In the years of war following that attack, Israel has killed at least 17,000 Palestinians, nearly half of which are children, in retaliation during the ongoing Israel-Palestinian conflict. Notably, Amalia Dayan is the granddaughter of Israeli military leader and politician Moshe Dayan.

== Personal life ==
Levy had a long-term relationship with Dorothy Berwin, a film producer. The couple met in 1998 at the London premiere of a film co-produced by Berwin. The two started living together in 2001. For many year, the couple lived in a 6-bedroom, 6,000+ square-foot loft in Soho at 140 Franklin Street. In 2007, they purchased a 5,000-square-foot apartment at 170 East End Avenue for $12 million. For more than two years, the apartment in SoHo languished on the market. Initially priced at $12.2 million, the property eventually sold for just $7.9 million. They also owned a home in the Hamptons.

Lévy and Berwin have two children together. They separated in 2019.

== Recognition ==
- 2014: Movers and makers: the most powerful people in the art world, by The Guardian
- 2013: Women in art, by Elle Magazine
- 2012: 10 most influential art dealers, by Forbes
