= Amy Bessone =

American visual artist

- Born: 1970 (age 55–56); New York, USA
- Occupation: contemporary visual artist
- Known for: Painting
- Website: www.amybessone.com

Amy Bessone (born 1970) is an American contemporary visual artist based in Los Angeles. Bessone studied at De Ateliers in Amsterdam, Parsons Paris School of Art and Design in Paris, and Barnard College in New York City.

== Education ==
1995 De Ateliers, Amsterdam, the Netherlands 1993 BFA, Parsons Paris School of Design, Paris, France 1992 École Nationale Supérieure des Beaux-Arts, Paris, France 1989 Barnard College, New York, USA

== Awards ==
Guggenheim Fellowship 2026 Yaddo Residency 2002

== Exhibitions ==
Bessone has presented solo exhibitions at Salon 94 in New York, the Gavlak Gallery in Los Angeles, the David Kordansky Gallery in Los Angeles, Praz-Delavallade in Paris, and Veneklasen Werner in Berlin. Her work is included in the permanent collections of the Museum of Contemporary Art, Los Angeles, Frac Bretagne, Chateaugiron, the Saatchi Collection in London, the Rennie Collection in Vancouver, and the Rubell Family Collection in Miami. Bessone's work features in a number of museum collections including Museum of Contemporary Art, Los Angeles, and Frac Bretagne, Châteaugiron. Her work has also been acquired by foundations, including Rennie Museum, Vancouver, and Rubell Family Collection, Miami.
