= Skarstedt =

Contemporary art gallery

Skarstedt is a contemporary art gallery with locations in New York, London, and Paris.

== History ==
The gallery was founded in 1992 by art dealer Per Skarstedt. Skarstedt's first acquisition, at the age of 23, was a work by Richard Prince.

Skarstedt moved to New York and opened his first Upper East Side gallery at 1018 Madison Avenue in 1992. In 2007, the gallery moved into 20 East 79th Street, the former gallery of Paul Rosenberg & Co., designed by Francis d'Haene. By 2014, it took over the 560 square metres (6,000 square feet) gallery space formerly occupied by Haunch of Venison at 550 West 21st Street in Chelsea and had it redesigned by Annabelle Selldorf. In 2019, Skarstedt opened a second space in New York's Upper East Side, located in a 2,300 square metres (25,000 square feet) space at 19 East 64th Street.

In 2012, Skarstedt expanded with a gallery in London at 8 Bennett Street, designed by Thomas Croft. A second, 164.0 square metres (1,765 square feet) space opened in 2016.

Skarstedt opened a 140 square metres (1,500 square feet) gallery in 2020 at 66 Newtown Lane in East Hampton. That same year, Skarstedt opened an 74 square metres (800 square feet) pop-up in Palm Beach, exhibiting Richard Prince Nurses and new sculptures by KAWS.

The gallery also opened its first location in Paris in 2021, at 2 Avenue Matignon, designed by Jacques Grange.

In 2024, the gallery announced plans open an additional New York space in a 560 square metres (6,000 square feet) building at West 25th Street which was designed by architect Richard Gluckman and previously housed Cheim & Read.

== Artists ==
The gallery is known for its focus on contemporary artists such as:

- Cristina BanBan (since 2022)
- Georg Baselitz
- George Condo
- Eric Fischl (since 2015)
- KAWS
- Barbara Kruger
- Albert Oehlen
- Richard Prince
- Cindy Sherman
- Sue Williams

In addition, the gallery manages various artist estates, including:

- Martin Kippenberger (in collaboration with Galerie Gisela Capitain)
- Andy Warhol

In the past, the gallery has worked with several other artists, including:

- David Salle (2023)
