= George Getzel Cohen =

South African-Australian radiologist (1927–2023)

George Getzel Cohen (30 July 1927 – 9 December 2023) was a South African-Australian radiologist.

== Biography ==
Born on 30 July 1927 in Johannesburg, Cohen attended Parktown Boys' High School and the University of the Witwatersrand. After this, he founded Harry's Angels, an innovative flying doctors project which flew specialists from South Africa to Swaziland through the 1970s, bringing free specialist treatment to an impoverished country.

The kingdom of Swaziland had few specialists of its own at that time, relying on general practitioners for all medical work. Cohen, a Johannesburg radiologist, approached Harry Oppenheimer, a mining magnate with progressive views, to provide small airplanes to fly surgeons and other specialists from Johannesburg to Mbabane for weekends where they would donate their time to the local hospital. Before Cohen created the project, patients had to be flown to Johannesburg at considerable cost to receive specialist intervention. The project received considerable acclaim in South Africa and Swaziland.

The all-white South African government attempted to use Cohen to provide a similar scheme to one of its Bantustans — land tracts usually without mineral resources parcelled out to blacks — in an attempt to justify apartheid. The aim of involving Cohen was to validate the Bantustans as separate countries to which South Africa was providing help. But Cohen, strongly committed to a non-racist South Africa, refused. Instead, he drew attention to the poverty and malnourishment in these areas, pointing out basic needs which required attention to before specialist medical services could be of use. His refusal drew front-page national news coverage.

Cohen won a seat in the Johannesburg City Council representing the anti-apartheid Progressive Party.

Cohen handed over leadership of Harry's Angels to another doctor in 1978 when he migrated to Sydney, Australia, where he ran a highly successful radiology practice for nearly thirty years.

Cohen attended Parktown Boys' High School and the University of the Witwatersrand. He obtained his post-graduate degrees in London at the Royal College of Physicians and Surgeons. He was married his wife of 72 years, Vivian, and had three children, and four grandchildren. Cohen died in Sydney on 9 December 2023, at the age of 96.

Family:

Vivian Cohen, Mark Cohen, Dawn Cohen, Daniel Cohen, Carin Cohen, Gina Cohen, Jayden Cohen, Zac Cohen, Tyler Cohen, Riley Cohen, Andrew Cohen, Gina Cohen.
