= Hanover Acceptances =

Hanover Acceptances Limited
- Founded: 1974
- Founder: Manfred Gorvy
- Key people: Sean Gorvy (CEO)
- Website: hanoveracceptances.com

Hanover Acceptances Limited is a holding company founded 1974 by Manfred Gorvy.

Companies:

- Dorrington Plc
- Refresco Gerber
- African Realty Trust
- Fresh Capital
