= Carlos Rolón =

American painter (born 1970)

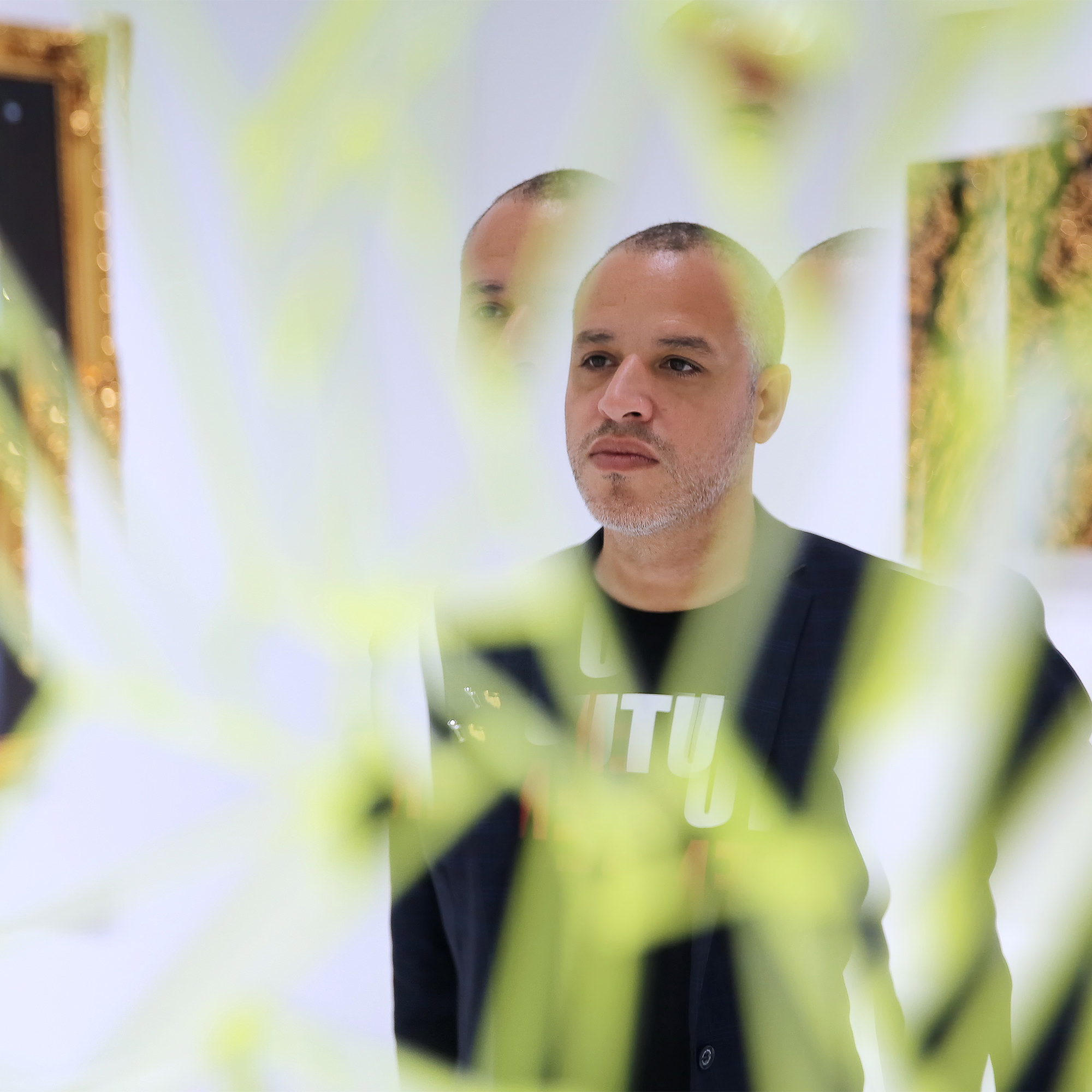
- Rolón in 2015
- Born: 1970 (age 55–56); Chicago, Illinois, U.S.
- Education: Columbia College Chicago
- Known for: Painting, Drawing, and Sculpture
- Website: carlosrolon.com

Carlos Rolón (born 1970), also known professionally under the pseudonym Dzine, is an American contemporary visual artist of Puerto Rican descent. Rolón's work has been shown at museums and galleries internationally, including the Bass Museum of Art, Miami, Marta Herford Museum, Germany, Museo de Arte de Ponce, Puerto Rico, New Orleans Museum of Art, and the 2007 Venice Biennale.

== Early life, education and career ==
Carlos Rolón was born and raised in Chicago, where he still lives and works. Rolón attended Columbia College Chicago in 1989, with a concentration in painting and drawing. His early career was heavily influenced by early New York City street, hip hop, disco and punk culture of the 1980s. He abandoned creating work as a street artist for abstract paintings in his early twenties. His travels to Europe in the early 1990s eventually led the artist to Paris's underground music and fashion worlds at artist space Hôpital éphémère (fr). A project for the now defunct French record label Yellow Productions brought the artist to Japan, where in 2003 he was introduced to Masami Shiraishi. The owner and director of Scai the Bathhouse, a contemporary art gallery known for introducing Japan's avant-garde artists to the world as well as for helping artists from abroad to establish a presence in Japan, he offered Rolón a solo exhibition, which sold out before the opening.

In 2005, the Contemporary Art Museum St. Louis held a solo exhibition of Rolon's work, curated by Shannon Fitzgerald and Paul Ha, titled "Punk Funk." His most significant exhibition in the US up to that point, the show included several new works created for the show, including a 14 by 42 foot site-specific installation. The exhibition was accompanied by a full color publication with audio.

Rolón was initially represented by Chicago gallerist Monique Meloche from 2001 to 2010 and his paintings appeared at the Museum of Contemporary Art, Chicago and Chicago Cultural Center during that time. A significant advance in Rolón's career came in 2007 when Jeffrey Deitch, owner of Deitch Projects, took note of his work at the 52nd Venice Biennale and offered him a solo exhibition and began representing him. Rolón has since had solo shows in Asia, Europe, Africa, and Puerto Rico.

== Work ==
For the Ukrainian Pavilion at the 2007 Venice Biennale, where Rolón was one of four non-Ukrainian artists invited to take part, the artist transformed an 18-foot speedboat into a multimedia installation and sculpture called "Dnipro." Following the success of Dnipro, Rolón continued to work with skilled fabricators to develop a fleet of customized vehicle and bicycle sculptures that drew on Kustom Kulture.

Beginning in 2011, Rolón started exploring nail art with intricate custom nail designs, exhibitions, events, and a book. In September 2011 in New York City, Rolón held a popup nail salon called "Get Nailed" at the New Museum, where visitors were invited to have elaborate designs painted on their nails by New York nail artists. This ran alongside an exhibition titled "Imperial Nail Salon" at Salon 94 Freemans nearby. To coincide with the exhibitions, Rolón published the book "Nailed: The History of Nail Culture," a geographically-organized extraordinary nail art and nail salon environments. In February 2012, Rolón continued to elaborate the nail art theme with a site-specific installation called "Imperial Nail Salon" at The Standard Hotel in Miami as part of Art Basel Miami Beach. The installation and interactive event, in which actress Tilda Swinton participated, was a recreation of the living room in the artist's childhood home where his mother operated a private nail salon. In 2013, a new version of "Imperial Nail Salon (My parents' living room)" was installed as part of the Homebodies exhibition at the Museum of Contemporary Art in Chicago.

While the exhibitions on nail art were inspired by his mother's home nail salon, Rolón's subsequent work was inspired by his father's love of boxing. In 2014, Rolón released the book Boxed: A Visual History and the Art of Boxing, a survey of art related to the sport, which the artist describes as an homage to his father. This coincided with a two-part exhibition titled "Born, Carlos Rolón, 1970" on view simultaneously in early 2014 at Paul Kasmin Gallery and Salon 94 in New York City. The exhibition was based on a recreation of his family's basement where Rolón's father and his friends watched boxing matches. The show traveled to Art Cologne in Germany in April 2014 under the name "Trophy Room".

Rolon's current studio practice, as noted by Dick Goody, director of the Oakland University Art Gallery and curator of the Oakland University Art Collection explains..... "Rolón operates as his own protagonist and is the author and conductor of various trajectories that result in art objects and environments that allow us to enter (and be welcomed) into his world. A quantum of his practice is deeply informed by a postcolonial vantage point, his sense of and relationship with the Afro-Caribbean diaspora, and a distinctive autobiography ... Rolón's promiscuous use of art history, personal connections and intimate histories, along with the materials and textures from periods of influence (often from the artist's own life). He is committed to re-imagining and aligning ideas and cultures to a level of timeless luxury available to everyone ... Rolón's multidisciplinary art is, by its nature, figurative and specific ... He modifies objects, at times showy rococo platforms of taste, via an extreme longing made manifest in his enthusiasm for childhood recollections, remembrances of (faux) luxury and a frank, unironic affectionate retelling of what it was like, for him, growing up."

Additionally, noted by artist and professor Theaster Gates, Jr.: "Carlos brings us to attention and focus – a lightning rod to the true art in this cruel world. Channeling ordinary materials into intricate constructions, he seeks hope and abundance in overlooked cultures, in the carts, the nail salons, in the everyday hustle."

In May 2019, Rolón installed 160 vinyl sheets around the glass atrium of the Chase Bank on the corner of Water Street and Wisconsin Avenue in downtown Milwaukee for Sculpture Milwaukee's 2019 exhibit. Meant to be a seasonal display, it remained in place through the COVID-19 pandemic and has become an iconic visual for the city.

== Exhibitions ==
Rolón has held the following solo exhibitions:

- "Punk Funk," Contemporary Art Museum, St. Louis (2005)
- "Beautiful Otherness," Museo de Arte de Puerto Rico, San Juan, Puerto Rico (2006)
- "Just Kidding," Baltic Centre for Contemporary Art, Gateshead, UK (2006)
- Bass Museum of Art, Miami (2009)
- La Pelanda - Centro di produzione culturale, Rome (2012)
- "Victory," The Dallas Contemporary, Dallas (2013)
- "Now and Then," Rockford Art Museum, Illinois (2015)
- "Commonwealth," Oakland University Art Gallery, Michigan (2016)
- "Vintage Voyages and Atomic Memories," Mike Kelley's Mobile Homestead, Museum of Contemporary Art Detroit, Michigan (2016)
- "I Tell You This Sincerely," Chicago Cultural Center, Illinois (2016)
- "Tropicalizia," Museum of Art of Ponce|Museo de Arte de Ponce, San Juan, Puerto Rico (2016)
- "50 Grand," Tube Factory artspace, Indianapolis, Indiana (2017)
- "Outside/ In," New Orleans Museum of Art 2018

His work has also been exhibited in group shows at:

- MARTa Herford Museum, Germany (2014)
- Zaçheta National Gallery of Art, Warsaw, Poland (2013)
- Museo del Barrio, New York and Centro Atlantico de Arte Moderno (CAAM), Canary Islands (2011)
- Museum of Contemporary Art, Chicago (2002, 2013)
- Museum of Contemporary Art, San Diego (2010)
- 52nd Venice Biennale, Venice, Italy (2007)
- Museum Het Domein, Sittard, The Netherlands (2007)
- Brooklyn Museum, Brooklyn, NY (2007)
- Baltic Centre for Contemporary Art, UK (2006)

== Awards and residencies ==
Rolón received the Joan Mitchell Foundation Award for Painting and Sculpture in 2006 and was awarded an artist residency in New Orleans in 2017. Rolón has been involved in many artist residencies including Instituto Buena Bista, Curaçao Centre for Contemporary Art, Netherlands Antilles; Baltic Centre for Contemporary Art, Gateshead, UK; and the City of Chicago's Sister Cities Program with The National Museum in Nairobi, Kenya.

== Collections ==
Rolón's work is included in the following public collections:

- Bass Museum of Art, Miami
- Brooklyn Museum, New York
- City of Chicago Public Art Collection
- Daegu Art Museum, Daegu, South Korea
- Joyce Foundation, Chicago
- Museo del Barrio, New York
- Museo de Arte de Ponce, Puerto Rico
- Museo de Arte de Puerto Rico, San Juan
- Museum Het Domein, Sittard, The Netherlands
- Museum of Contemporary Art, San Diego
- Nerman Museum of Contemporary Art, Kansas City
- Pinchuk Art Centre, Kyiv, Ukraine

== Publications ==
- Commonwealth: 2016 (Oakland University Art Gallery) Foreword by Dick Goody, essay by Theaster Gates. ISBN 978-0-925859-69-3.
- BOXED: 2014 (Damiani Editore) Foreword by Franklin Sirmans, text by Christopher Bedford, Brittany Reilly and Zoe Larkins. ISBN 978-88-6208-354-6 .
- NAILED (The History of Nail Culture and Dzine): 2011 (Damiani Editore), text by Brittany Reilly. ISBN 978-88-6208-205-1.
- Punk Funk: 2005 (Contemporary Art Museum, St. Louis) Text by Paul Ha and Shannon Fitzgerald. ISBN 0-9712195-7-5.
- Infinite Island: Contemporary Caribbean Art: 2007 (Brooklyn Museum of Art/Philip Wilson Publishers) Foreword by Tumelo Mosaka. ISBN 978-0-87273-158-5.
- None of the Above, Contemporary Work by Puerto Rican Artists: 2004 (Real Art Ways in collaboration with Museo de Arte de Puerto Rico) Text by Silvia Karman Cubiña, Deborah Cullen and Stephen Holmes. ISBN 9780971785915.
