= Manfred Gorvy =

South African businessman

- Born: Manfred Stanley Gorvy; 4 May 1938 (age 88); South Africa
- Education: University of the Witwatersrand
- Occupations: Investor, philanthropist
- Known for: founder and chairman of Hanover Acceptances
- Spouse: Lydia R. Gorvy
- Children: 4, including Brett Gorvy

Manfred S. Gorvy (born 4 May 1938) is a South African billionaire investor and philanthropist based in London. He is the founder and chairman of Hanover Acceptances.

== Early life ==
Manfred S. Gorvy was born on 4 May 1938 in South Africa. He attended Parktown Boys' High School and later received a Bachelor of Commerce from the University of the Witwatersrand in Johannesburg.

== Career ==
He founded Hanover Acceptances, a property, agribusiness and financial investment company, in 1974, and serves as chairman. The firm includes four subsidiaries: Dorrington; Refresco Gerber; African Realty Trust; Fresh Capital. The Blackstone Group tried to acquire Refresco Gerber in 2014; the offer was rejected by Gorvy.

He is a Fellow of the South African Institute of Chartered Accountants.

In 2008, Gorvy was the 312th richest person in the United Kingdom, with an estimated wealth of £260 million, according to the Sunday Times Rich List. Ten years later, he appeared on the Sunday Times Rich List 2018 as the 163rd richest person in the United Kingdom, with a reported fortune of £873 million.

== Personal life ==
He is married to Lydia R. Gorvy, who has served on the Board of Directors of Hanover Acceptances since 1991. They have four children.

== Philanthropy ==
In 2011, the Gorvys endowed the refurbishment of a lecture theatre at the Victoria and Albert Museum in London, which was then renamed The Lydia and Manfred Gorvy Lecture Theatre. The couple have also made substantial donations to the Royal National Theatre, the Tate, the Royal Shakespeare Company, and the Donmar Warehouse.
