= Liz Cohen =

American artist (born 1973)

- Born: 1973 (age 52–53); Phoenix, Arizona, U.S.
- Education: School of the Museum of Fine Arts, Tufts University, California College of the Arts
- Known for: performance art, photography, automotive design, educator
- Website: https://www.lizcohenstudio.com/

Liz Cohen (born 1973) is an American artist, known as a performance artist, photographer, educator, and automotive designer. She currently teaches at Arizona State University (ASU), and lives in Phoenix, Arizona.

== Early life and education ==
Cohen was born 1973 in Phoenix, Arizona and was raised there, a first-generation American of a Colombian Jewish family.

Cohen graduated with a dual major in 1996 with a BFA degree in studio art from the School of the Museum of Fine Arts and a BA degree in philosophy from Tufts University. At the School of the Museum of Fine Arts, Cohen studied with photographer Bill Burke. After graduating in 1996, she travelled to Panama and documented transgender sex workers. She eventually formed relationships with her subjects and started dressing up and performing, blurring the relationship between documentation and performance.

Cohen received an MFA in photography from California College of the Arts (formally known as California College of the Arts and Crafts) in 2000.

== Career ==
In 2002, she was a fellow at Akademie Schloss Solitude in Stuttgart, Germany. It was in Germany that she became interested in the Trabant, a common car in East Germany during the Cold War. This interest would go on to inform her work, including the Bodywork project. In 2004, Cohen moved to Phoenix, Arizona to be closer to her mother and to focus her efforts on learning about cars and car culture at Elwood Body Works, studying under mechanic Bill Cherry.

In 2011, Cohen appeared as a guest judge on the Bravo television show 'Work of Art: The Next Great Artist (season 2, episode 7).

Her work was included in the group exhibition Xican-a.o.x. Body at the Pérez Art Museum Miami, in 2024. The show is a scholarly presentation on the experiences and contributions of Chicano artists to contemporary culture with artworks from the 1960s to today. The exhibition was curated by feminist art historian Cecilia Fajardo-Hill, and curators Marissa Del Toro, and Gilbert Vicario. An accompanying catalog was published by the Chicago University Press.

=== Teaching ===
Between 2008 until 2017, Cohen was the Artist-in-Residence and Head of the Photography Department at Cranbrook Academy of Art. In 2017, she joined Arizona State University (ASU) as an Associate Professor of Photography in the School of Art, within Herberger Institute for Design and the Arts.

=== Bodywork project ===
Cohen is most notable for her Bodywork art project and the work Trabantamino (2002–2010) transforming an East German 1987 Trabant automobile into a 1973 Chevrolet El Camino using gears and hydraulics. As part of the project, Cohen transformed her body and hired a personal trainer and dieted so she could appear in a bikini to be the model for the car at lowrider shows and for a series of photographs used to promote and document the project. She had mentioned wanting to feel less like a performer and more like an "insider" of the masculine car subculture, and the female modeling aspect of the car photos were part of her membership.

Photographs from the project have been shown at solo shows at Fargfabriken in Stockholm and Galerie Laurent Godin in Paris as well as numerous publications, including the cover of German culture magazine Sleek (Winter 2006/2007 issue) and the November 2007 issue of The Believer. The car was outfitted with motion sensors, cameras and projectors to create an interactive exhibit. The project and its documentation was financed primarily through a 2005 grant from Creative Capital.

== Awards ==
- 2020: Guggenheim Fellowship from the John Simon Guggenheim Memorial Foundation. for photography.
