= Florian Maier-Aichen =

German landscape photographer

- Born: 1973 (age 52–53); Stuttgart, West Germany
- Education: University of California, Los Angeles; University of Essen; Hoegskolan for Fotografi och Film Gothenborg
- Style: landscape photography

Florian Maier-Aichen (born 1973 in Stuttgart, West Germany) is a landscape photographer based in Cologne, Germany and Los Angeles, US. He uses a combination of traditional photographic techniques and computer imaging.

Maier-Aichen studied at the University of California, Los Angeles, the University of Essen in Germany, and at the Hoegskolan for Fotografi och Film Gothenborg in Sweden.

His work features in several important public collections including the Denver Art Museum, the Los Angeles Museum of Contemporary Art in Los Angeles, the Walker Art Center in Minneapolis, the Whitney Museum of American Art in New York, and the Saatchi Gallery in London. He participated in the 2006 Whitney Biennial.
