= Robert Mnuchin =

American art dealer and banker (1933–2025)

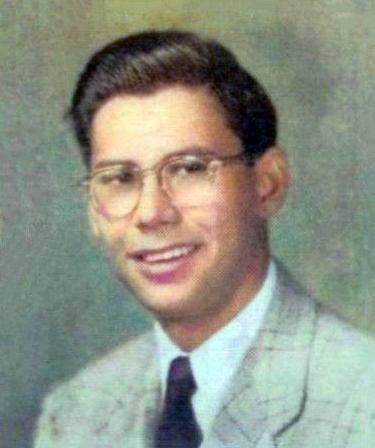
- High school yearbook portrait, 1951
- Born: Robert Eliot Mnuchin; September 5, 1933; New York City, U.S.
- Died: December 19, 2025 (aged 92); Bridgewater, Connecticut, U.S.
- Education: Yale University
- Occupations: Goldman Sachs partner, art dealer
- Known for: founder, Mnuchin Gallery
- Spouse(s): Elaine Terner Cooper (divorced); Adriana Mnuchin
- Children: 5, including Steven

Robert Eliot Mnuchin (/məˈnuːʃɪn/ mə-NOO-shin; September 5, 1933 – December 19, 2025) was an American art dealer and previously an investment banker. After a 33-year career with Goldman Sachs, he retired to found the Mnuchin Gallery in New York City.

As an art dealer, Mnuchin was particularly known for his long association with Dutch-American abstract painter Willem de Kooning. In 2019, he set a record for the most money paid for a work by a living artist by bidding $80 million for Jeff Koons's Rabbit.

== Early life ==
Mnuchin was born in Manhattan on September 5, 1933, and grew up in Scarsdale, New York. His parents, Harriet (Gevirtz) and Leon A. Mnuchin, were "modest collectors" of art, owning pieces by Franz Kline, Mark Rothko, and a piece by Henri Matisse later revealed as a fake. Mnuchin graduated from Yale University in 1955.

== Career ==
After graduating from Yale, Mnuchin served in the U.S. Army for two years as a private. He subsequently joined Goldman Sachs in 1957, staying there for 33 years. Mnuchin was named a general partner in 1967, headed the trading-and-arbitrage division in 1976, and joined the management committee in 1980. He, along with his co-worker at Goldman, Gus Levy, developed Goldman's block-trading business and ran the firm's equities division until his retirement in 1990 to pursue his interest in art. In his final year before retirement, he earned a reported $8.7 million salary.

In 1992, Mnuchin opened his gallery, C & M Arts, with James Corcoran, a Los Angeles-based dealer. Mnuchin became particularly known for his exhibitions of the work of Dutch-American abstract artist Willem de Kooning, including a 50-year retrospective. Among other shows, the gallery hosted an exhibition of Jeff Koons's work that, according to Koons's biographer, helped restore the sculptor to prominence after a previous failed show. His gallery has also exhibited work by Andy Warhol, Donald Judd, Frank Stella, John Chamberlain, Alexander Calder, Philip Guston, Damien Hirst, Julian Schnabel, David Hammons, Sam Gilliam, Ed Clark, Lynn Drexler, Joan Mitchell, Lynda Benglis, and Mary Lovelace O’Neal.

In 2005, the name of gallery was changed to L&M Arts when Mnuchin entered into partnership with Dominique Lévy; she left in 2013 to open her own gallery nearby. After Levy's departure, dealer Sukanya Rajaratnam was promoted to a partner at the again-renamed Mnuchin Gallery, remaining in the position until 2023. In February 2026, the Gallery announced it would close at the end of the month following Mnuchin's passing.

In 2019, Mnuchin set a new record for the highest amount paid for an artwork by a living artist when he bid $80 million ($91.1 million after fees) in a Christie's auction for Rabbit, a 1986 stainless steel sculpture by Jeff Koons, on behalf of an anonymous client later revealed to be hedge-fund manager Steve Cohen.

Mnuchin's personal collection included work by De Kooning, Jackson Pollock, and Mark Rothko.

== Personal life and death ==
Mnuchin married his first wife, Elaine Terner Cooper, in 1957. They had two children. One son, Alan G. Mnuchin, was a vice president at Goldman Sachs in 1995, when he married Kimberly E. Kassel. The second son, Steven Mnuchin, also became a banker with Goldman Sachs and later Secretary of the Treasury. In 1999 Cooper was a vice president of the Solomon R. Guggenheim Museum's international directors council, and a director of the Byrd Hoffman Foundation. She died on May 14, 2005.

Mnuchin married his second wife, Adriana, in 1963. Adriana Mnuchin founded retail enterprises Tennis Lady and Cashmere-Cashmere. In 1995, she co-founded The Shakespeare Society, and in 2009, Roundtable Cultural Seminars, an adult continuing education organization. Robert and Adriana Mnuchin had one child together: a daughter, Valerie Mnuchin. Robert and Valerie Mnuchin opened a restaurant together in Shelter Island, New York in 2023. His step-daughter, Lisa Abelow Hedley, was nominated for an Emmy award for documentary film, and is married to the writer of Flashdance, Tom Hedley, with whom she has four children.

In 1990, Mnuchin and his wife Adriana bought the Mayflower Inn, a country house hotel in Washington, Connecticut, which they turned into a Relais & Chateaux 30-room hotel, spa, and restaurant, before selling it in 2007. In 2011, they purchased a 5,850-square-foot (543 m^{2}) Upper East Side house at 14 East 95th Street from Solomon Asser for $14.25 million, using his company, Nuke Properties LLC. Initially listed in 2014 at $17 million, it sold in January 2016 to Alastair and Alisa Wood for a reported $13 million.

Mnuchin's son Steven served as the Secretary of the Treasury in the first Trump cabinet. The elder Mnuchin contributed to Democratic politicians in most election cycles and declined to discuss his son's politics with the press.

Mnuchin died in Bridgewater, Connecticut, on December 19, 2025, at the age of 92.
