= Jacob Kassay =

American painter

Jacob Kassay (born 1984 in Lewiston, New York) is a post-conceptual artist best known for his work in painting, filmmaking, and sculpture. Critics have noted the influence of minimalist music and composition on his work, which applies a structural approach to the biological mechanisms of sight and spatial recognition. Kassay currently lives in New York City and is represented by 303 Gallery.

== Early life ==
Kassay was born to Stephen and Rebecca Kassay. Both of his parents were government employees with Niagara County, New York. His father worked for the United States Postal Service and the department of Weights and Measures, and his mother worked in the county's probation office.

He attended college at the State University of New York at Buffalo, where he received a BFA in photography. As a student, Kassay studied with faculty such as Sylvie Belanger and Steve Kurtz of Critical Art Ensemble, who exposed him to semiotic and image theory, structuralism and post-structuralism, as well as the region's art historical significance to these ideas and artistic movements.

As a student, Kassay and fellow students at UB, founded Kitchen Distribution, a music center and art space. The organization was originally motivated by a class assignment, but would go one to become an important local venue. Burning Star Core, Tony Conrad, Japanther, and Pengo were among those that played there. Kitchen Distribution would also host Kassay's first solo exhibition, presenting the original series of paintings for which he would later become known.

Kassay eventually moved to New York, and early public exposure would come from the group exhibitions Cinema Zero: Bendover/Hangover organized by Amy Granat at White Flag Projects, St Louis and Neo-Integrity organized by Keith Meyerson at Derek Eller Gallery, New York. Early champions of the work were artists such as Ann Craven, Maurizio Cattelan, and Olivier Mosset, as well as curator Bob Nickas.

== Work ==
Kassay has described his work as the relationship between structured forms and the individuated body. According to him, he uses traditional media to amplify haptic phenomena, and expose the mechanics of how space is conditioned.

Jacob Kassay, Untitled, 2010, graphite and silver tape on paper, 11 x 14 inches (27.94 x 35.56 cm)

Kassay is known for his use of industrial processes and materials, which he often uses to create works resistant to widespread reproduction. His earliest series of paintings made use of electroplating to produce compositions that reflect and distort the environment in which they are displayed. Critic Alex Bacon has written that these paintings “actively pose the question—what does it mean to be represented?...This kind of aesthetic activity is suspended somewhere between the “real” world that is reflected, and the particular aesthetic world a painting inhabits as an...autonomous thing.” The curator Anthony Huberman described how their “surfaces perform a graceful bait-and-switch: while they’re clearly seductive, they also divert the eye and blur its focus.”

His use of alternative surface treatments also characterize his paintings as cultural objects, while his chosen materials tend to produce compositions that uncouple painting from any fixed viewpoint. Multi-spec, a type of wall treatment which contains pigments that deliberately never blend together, have been applied to canvases, or directly to gallery walls. The physical properties of the paint are integral to these paintings. Additionally, they reflect an archive of the labor involved in the studio: Kassay collects the canvas discarded from other paintings, and produces unique stretchers to match each remnant, now numbering in the hundreds.

Kassay often draws upon earlier movements such as institutional critique. One series involved library books, which were borrowed from a nearby library. These works contrast public and commercial contexts to foreground certain unspoken commercial standards that determine how people interact with an artwork. The byproducts of regulation also forms the basis of a series of freestanding aluminum sculptures. The airspace above a series of specific stairwells were reproduced in works the artist refers to as “gutted corridors”. They were produced using highly skilled techniques, and push the material to its representational limits.

Untitled (2015) at Basel Unlimited and II (2018) at Anthology Film Archive

His two films are based on the temporal interaction between the camera and a hovering helicopter. Exploiting an accident of industrial regulations, the relationship between the camera and its subject produces an uncanny image of a flying helicopter with stationary rotors. In Untitled a single-blade model is featured, and was originally screened at Basel Unlimited. For II, Kassay documented one with a double-rotor; the final film was screened at Anthology Film Archive, and toured as part of the exhibition Mechanisms, organized by Anthony Huberman.

== Writings ==
Kassay has written extensively on other artists. His writing has appeared in The Brooklyn Rail, Mousse, and L'Officiel Art among other publications.

In “On Demand”, an article about fellow Buffalonian Ad Reinhardt published by The Brooklyn Rail, Kassay draws attention to the late artist's canny understanding of mass media and its effect on painting. “The conglomeration of print technologies through which these paintings have passed have in turn yielded an excess of black surface,” Kassay observes. “This proliferation called into question the value of one surface’s equivalency to another and moved painting out of the singular. One could say that what was visible was less an object than a distributed effect.” In a later interview, Kassay spoke to Reinhardt's influence on him: “With Reinhardt, we’re not talking about a solely retinal experience; we’re talking about something that is also an absolutist schema on what a painting should be, which posits how it should function and how it should be understood.”

Kassay's writing is also attentive to art history from Buffalo, New York. In Mousse, he reconsiders the overlooked artist and filmmaker, Paul Sharits. The text is careful to make room for a broad, nuanced, and intimate portrait of his fellow artist. On Sharits’ film, Apparent Motion (1975), Kassay writes: “[It] lacks sound, as well as the diagrammatic studies Sharits usually produced as installation instructions, marking a more meandering, less programmatic approach to his films. The stroboscopic, random distribution of the film ‘grain’ is equally an explication of a medium's properties (i.e., film as the duration of a surface) while to some degree crossing into the territory of painting with fluctuating accelerations and stops.”

== Exhibitions ==
Solo exhibition at Institute of Contemporary Arts, London The Institute of Contemporary Art, London presented Kassay’s first solo museum exhibition in 2011. The exhibition featured several of Kassay’s chrome paintings, as well as a few shaped canvases, which “enact a...deflection, describing the negative space adjacent to them.” In an essay accompanying the exhibition, MoMA/PS1 curator Peter Eleey wrote, “In this desire for a kind of situational assimilation, they set themselves against their objecthood...His paintings deflect attention away from themselves; their reflective surfaces send light elsewhere….They try to play dead, deferring to their surroundings and those looking at them.”

At the opening of the exhibition, minimalist composer, Rhys Chatham was invited to perform Rêve Parisien. The composition was eventually released as “an audio catalogue” to Kassay's work at this time by Primary Information in 2011.

Untitled (disambiguation) at The Kitchen

The 2013 exhibition at The Kitchen in New York City, Untitled (disambiguation) displayed an early series of his remnant paintings. The exhibition was also unique for Kassay's interpretation of the performance venue's black box theater, as well his use of the institution's archive. Kassay said of the show: “I put work throughout the building in places where paintings rarely rest—such as in the video archive, or in the lobby—to emphasize their presentation as an almost momentary, contingent stage. The paintings were made so that they could be moved easily around the space and remain variable to the activity of the environment.” In a review of a later show, New York Times critic Roberta Smith called Untitled (disambiguation) “quietly beautiful”.

OTNY at the Albright Knox Art Gallery Kassay's first solo museum exhibition in the United States took place at the Albright Knox Art Gallery in Buffalo, New York in 2017. The show was based on how the “implicit habits shape the way we rationalize, navigate, and narrate our own movement through familiar spaces.” It featured Jerk (2017), a series of sculptures that recreate the arrangement of goods inside common home cabinetry. Actual foodstuffs and canned goods were included. Additionally, Kassay replaced the handrail on the stairs leading to the museum's new wing. Users were guided along a series of braille letterforms all of which depicted the letter “H”, a symbol that often stands in for a pause or breath.

=== Select solo and group exhibitions ===
==== Solo ====
- Alarmer 2, July 2-August 20, 2017 at Team (Bungalow), Los Angeles, 2017
- H-L, November 3-December 22, 2016 at 303 Gallery, New York, 2016
- HIJK, May 29-July 1, 2015 at Xavier Hufkens, Brussels, 2015
- IJK, November 1-December 20, 2013 at 303 Gallery, New York, 2013
- No Goal, April 11-July 13, 2012 at Power Station, Dallas, 2012

==== Group ====
- Other Mechanisms, June 29-September 2, 2018, organized by Anthony Huberman, Secession, Vienna
- Mechanisms, October 12, 2017 – February 24, 2018, organized by Anthony Huberman, CCA Wattis, San Francisco, 2017
- From Minimalism into Algorithm, January 8-April 2, 2016 at The Kitchen, New York<, 2016
- Mississippi, October 3, 2014 – January 15, 2015, organized by Sam Korman at GAMeC, Bergamo, 2014
- The Indiscipline of Painting Tate St Ives 8 October 2011 – 3 January 2012 touring to Warwick Art Centre (2011/12)
- Besides, With, Against, and Yet: Abstraction and the Ready-Made Gesture, November 13-December 31, 2009 at The Kitchen, New York, 2009
- Cinema Zero: Bendover/Hangover, May 10–17, 2008, organized by Amy Granat, White Flag Projects, St Louis, 2008

== Publications ==
- Standards, Surnames. Book. With contribution by Peter Eleey. Published by Mousse Publishing, Milan, 2015 ISBN 9788867491582
- ICA Facsimile. Catalog edition. Published by Gottlund Verlag, Kutztown, 2013
- ICA Redaction. Catalog edition. Published by Gottlund Verlag, Kutztown, 2013
- ICA Palimpsest. Catalog edition. Published by Gottlund Verlag, Kutztown, 2013
- No Goal. Exhibition catalog. With contribution by Ajay Kurian. Published by Power Station, Dallas, 2012
- Jacob Kassay. Exhibition catalog. With foreword by Gregror Muir; essay by Peter Eleey and conversation between Kassay & Matt Williams. Published by Institute for Contemporary Arts, London, 2011
- Jacob Kassay. Exhibition catalog. With contribution by Mario Diacono. Published by Gli Ori. Editori contemporanei, Pistoia, 2010
