= Karen Kilimnik =

American artist

- Born: 1955 (age 70–71); Philadelphia, Pennsylvania, US
- Education: Temple University, Philadelphia
- Known for: Painting, Installation art

Karen Kilimnik (born 1955) is an American painter and installation artist.

== Life and work ==
Karen traveled through much of the United States and Canada as a young child. She often spoke of Russell, Manitoba as being an inspiration for her later works. Karen Kilimnik studied at Temple University, Philadelphia.

Her installations reflected a young viewpoint of pop culture. An example of this work is her 1989 breakout The Hellfire Club Episode of the Avengers, which is composed of photocopied images, clothing, drawings, and other objects that reverentially embody the glamour, risk, and mod kitsch of the 1960s television show. The work exemplified the “scatter” style of her installations.

Kilimnik's paintings, characterised by loose brushwork, bold colors and "thrift shop paint-by-numbers awkwardness", are pastiches of the Old Masters and often incorporate portraits of celebrities. In contrast to the celebrity portraits of Elizabeth Peyton, Kilimnik, "blends together Conceptual and performance art and 1980's appropriation with the current interest in female psychology and identity."

Jonathan Jones described her portrait of Hugh Grant (1997) as "a nice example of a relatively new genre of painting, which we might call the iconic portrait, not commissioned by its sitter but based on photographs, magazine cuttings, film clips."

Her work is variously described as "sharp and witty...an interesting exercise in conceptual control" and as "wan and whimsical..."

== Collections ==
Kilimnik has work in the collection of the Museum of Modern Art, the Carnegie Museum of Art and the Whitney Museum of American Art.

== Bibliography ==
- Karen Kilimnik (ed. Lionel Bovier), Zurich: JRP/Ringier (2006).
