= Jeanne Greenberg Rohatyn =

American art dealer

- Born: 1967 (age 58–59); St Louis, Missouri
- Education: Vassar College
- Known for: Dealer

Jeanne Beth Greenberg Rohatyn (born c. 1967) is an American art dealer who is the owner of Salon 94, an art gallery with three locations in New York City.

== Early life and education ==
Greenberg Rohatyn was born in St Louis and is the daughter of author Jan Greenberg and Ronald K. Greenberg, the co-founder of art gallery Greenberg Van Doren in St Louis and New York City. She graduated from Vassar College.

== Career ==
=== Early beginnings ===
As a young curator, following a Greenberg Rohatyn stint at the New York University Institute of Fine Arts in the early nineties, she assisted then director Norman Rosenthal with American Art in the Twentieth Century: Painting and Sculpture. 1913-1933, a 1993 survey of American art from a European perspective at the Royal Academy of Arts in London and at Martin-Gropius-Bau in Berlin. She later became a partner of what was then the Artemis Greenberg Van Doren Gallery, a joint venture created in 2000 by Greenberg Van Doren and Artemis Fine Arts, a London gallery that specialized in old master and 19th-century paintings.

=== Salon 94 ===
The double-width Rafael Viñoly–designed townhouse on the Upper East Side, where Greenberg Rohatyn has lived since 2002 with her family also serves as her salon and gallery under the name Salon 94. Her personal collection includes pieces by David Hammons, Sarah Lucas, Julie Mehretu, Marilyn Minter, Richard Prince and Katy Grannan.

In 2006, Greenberg Rohatyn coproduced The Music of Regret, the first film directed by Laurie Simmons and starring Meryl Streep. She later appeared in the 2011 reality competition show Work of Art: The Next Great Artist alongside Jerry Saltz, Simon de Pury and China Chow.

Greenberg Rohatyn is known for her collaborations with celebrities outside of the art world. In 2011, she introduced baseball player Alex Rodriguez to New York artist Nate Lowman. Together, the two turned Rodriguez's personal batting cage into an art installation that was shown during the 2011 Art Basel Miami Beach. In 2014, she worked with rapper Jay Z and organized his music video for the single "Picasso Baby". The performance artist Marina Abramović, whose performance art piece was recreated in the video, spoke out to shame Jay Z for not making a donation to her performance art institute as he promised. Greenberg Rohatyn came to his defense, refuting the claims and producing receipts to a substantial donation Jay Z had made as promised.

=== LGDR ===
In August 2021, Greenberg Rohatyn announced plans to partner with Dominique Lévy, Brett Gorvy and Amalia Dayan on LGDR, a consortium to represent artists, organize exhibitions, advise collectors and broker auction sales.

== Other activities ==
Greenberg Rohatyn serves on the Boards of White Columns, the Art Dealer's Association of Art (ADAA) and Performae, the non-profit responsible for the international performance art biennial, and sits on the selection committee for the New York edition of Frieze Art Fair. She also serves on the national board of directors of the Contemporary Art Museum St. Louis. In 2014, she was named one of the top 25 most important women in the art world by Artnet.

== Personal life ==
Greenberg Rohatyn has been married to former JPMorgan Chase investment banker Nicolas Streit Rohatyn, the son of Ambassador Felix Rohatyn (1928-2019), since 1997. and is the mother of three children.
