= List of contemporary art galleries =

This is a list of contemporary art galleries, i.e., commercial galleries for-profit, privately owned businesses dealing in artworks by contemporary artists born after 1945.

Galleries on this list meet the following criteria:

- The gallery has played a major role in career of significant or well-known artists born after 1945
- The gallery has won significant critical attention
- The gallery is widely cited by peers

== List of contemporary art galleries ==
=== Intercontinental ===
==== From US ====
- Blum & Poe (Tim Blum and Jeff Poe), Los Angeles since 1994, New York since 2014, Tokyo since 2014
- Gavin Brown's Enterprise, New York since 1994, Roma since 2015
- Galerie Philia, since 2015: New York, Mexico, Geneva, New York and Singapore
- Gagosian Gallery, Los Angeles since 1979, New York since 1989, London since 2000, Roma since 2007, Athena since 2009, Paris and Geneva since 2010, Hong Kong since 2011, Le Bourget since 2012, San Francisco since 2016, Basel since 2019
- Barbara Gladstone Gallery, New York since 1979, Brussels since 2011
- Marian Goodman Gallery, New York since 1977, Paris since 1999, London since 2014
- Lehmann Maupin (Rachel Lehmann and David Maupin), New York since 1996, Hong Kong since 2013, Seoul since 2017, London since 2020
- Pace Gallery (Arne Glimcher et Marc Glimcher), New York since 1963, London since 2012, Hong Kong since 2014, Palo Alto since 2016, Seoul since 2017, Geneva since 2018
- Skarstedt Fine Art (Per Skarstedt), New York since 1994, London since 2012
- Von Lintel Gallery, Munich 1993, New York since 1999, Los Angeles since 2014
- David Zwirner Gallery, New York since 1993, London since 2012, Hong Kong since 2017, Paris since 2019

==== From Commonwealth ====
- Flowers Gallery (Angela Flowers), London since 1970, Los Angeles from 1998 to 2003, New York since 2003, Hong Kong since 2020
- Goodman Gallery, Johannesburg since 1966, Cape Town, London since 2019
- Haunch of Venison (Harry Blain and Graham Southern), London from 2002 to 2013, Zurich from 2005 to 2009, Berlin from 2007 to 2018, New York from 2008 to 2013
- Simon Lee Gallery, London since 2002, Hong Kong since 2012, New York since 2014
- Lisson Gallery, (Nicholas Logsdail), London since 1967, New York since 2016, Shanghai since 2019
- Marlborough Fine Art, London since 1946, New York since 1963, Madrid since 1992, Santiago since 1995, Barcelona since 2012
- Everard Read Gallery, Johannesburg since 1913, Cape Town since 1996, London since 2016
- White Cube, (Jay Jopling), London since 1993, Hong Kong since 2012

==== From Europe ====
- Galerie Buchholz (Daniel Buchholz & Christopher Müller), Cologne since 1986, Berlin since 2008, New York since 2015
- Galerie Ceysson & Bénétière (François Ceysson et Loïc Bénétière), Saint-Etienne since 2006, Luxembourg since 2008, Paris since 2009, Geneva since 2012, New York since 2017
- Galleria Continua, (Mario Cristiani, Lorenzo Fiaschi et Maurizio Rigillo), San Gimignano since 1990, Beijing since 2005, Les Moulins since 2007, La Havana since 2015, Roma since 2020
- Galleria Massimo De Carlo, Milan since 1987, London since 2009, Hong Kong since 2016
- Hauser & Wirth, (Iwan Wirth et Manuela Hauser), Zurich since 1992, London since 2003, New York since 2009, Somerset since 2014, Los Angeles since 2016, Hong Kong since 2018, Gstaad since 2019
- Marc Jancou Contemporary, Zurich from 1991 to 1996, London from 1996 to 2003, NYC since 2003, Geneva from 2011
- Yvon Lambert Gallery, Paris from 1966 to 2014, New York from 2003 to 2014
- Galerie Daniel Lelong (fr), Paris and Zurich since 1981, New York since 1985
- Galerie Nordenhake (Claes Nordenhake) (sv), Malmö from 1973 to 1986, Stockholm since 1986, Berlin since 2000, Mexico since 2018
- Galerie Emmanuel Perrotin, Paris since 1990, Hong Kong since 2012, New York since 2013, Seoul since 2016, Tokyo since 2017, Shanghai since 2018
- Galerie Almine Rech, Paris since 1997, Brussels since 2007, London since 2014, New York since 2016, Shanghai since 2019
- Sprüth Magers (Monika Sprüth et Philomene Magers), Cologne since 1983, London since 2003, Berlin since 2008, Los Angeles since 2016
- Galerie Eva Presenhuber, Zurich since 2003, New York since 2017
- Galerie Michael Werner, Berlin (1963-1969), Cologne (1969-1990), New York since 1990, Trebbin since 2009, London since 2012
- Anahita Sadighi Gallery, Berlin since 2023 (Neiriz – Non European Art Berlin since 1980, Anahita – Arts of Asia from 2015-2023, Anahita Contemporary from 2017-2023)

==== From MENA ====
- Dvir Gallery (Dvir Intrator), Tel Aviv since 1982, Brussels since 2016
- Gazelli Art House (Mila Askarova), Baku since 2003, London since 2012
- The Pill Gallery (Suela Cennet), Istanbul since 2016

==== From Asia ====
- HdM Gallery (Hadrien de Montferrand), Beijing since 2009, Hangzhou since 2013, London since 2018

=== United States ===
==== Transmetropolitan ====
- Marianne Boesky Gallery, New York since 1996, Aspen since 2017
- Tanya Bonakdar Gallery, New York since 1994, Los Angeles since 2018
- Richard Gray Gallery, Chicago since 1963, New York since 1997
- Phyllis Kind Gallery, Chicago from 1967 to 1998, New York from 1975 to 2009
- Michele Maccarone Gallery, New York since 2001, Los Angeles since 2015
- Team Gallery, (José Freire and Lisa Ruyter), New York since 1996, Los Angeles since 2014
- Pentimenti Gallery, (Christine Pfister), Philadelphia (since 2000)

==== Aspen, CO ====
- Baldwin Gallery, since 1994

==== Chicago ====
- Kavi Gupta Gallery, since 2000
- Serbian American Museum, established in 1952, defunct in 2016

==== Denver ====
- Robischon Gallery (Jim Robischon & Jennifer Doran), since 1976

==== Los Angeles ====
- Ace Gallery (Douglas Chrismas), since 1966
- Brockman Gallery (Dale Brockman Davis and Alonzo Davis), from 1967 to 1990
- Rosamund Felsen Gallery, since 1978
- Honor Fraser Gallery, since 2006
- David Kordansky Gallery, since 2003
- Margo Leavin Gallery from 1970 to 2013
- L.A. Louver Gallery, since 1976
- Maloney Fine Art, since 2006
- Patrick Painter Gallery, since 1997
- Regen Projects (Stuart Regen and Shaun Caley), since 1989
- Vielmetter Los Angeles Projects, since 2000

==== Miami ====
- Fredric Snitzer Gallery, since 1977

==== Montana ====
- Echo Arts, since 2020
- Eli Ridgway Gallery, since 2020

==== New York ====
- ACA Galleries since 1932
- Alexander and Bonin (Carolyn Alexander and Ted Bonin) since 1995
- Friedman Benda Gallery, since 2007
- Mary Boone Gallery, from 1977 to 2019
- Bykert Gallery, from 1966-1975, run by (Klaus Kertess, 1940-2016)
- Leo Castelli Gallery (died in 1999), since 1957
- Paula Cooper Gallery, since 1968
- Charles Cowles Gallery, from 1980 to 2009.
- Cheim & Read, since 1997
- James Cohan Gallery, since 1999
- CRG Gallery from 1990 to 2017
- D'Amelio Terras Gallery (Christopher D'Amelio and Lucien Terras), from 1996 to 2012
- Elizabeth Dee Gallery, from 1998 to 2018
- Eden Fine Art, (Cathia Klimovsky) since 1997
- Andre Emmerich Gallery (died in 2007), since 1959
- Wally Findlay Galleries from 1870 to the present.
- Green Gallery with Richard Bellamy (died in 1998), from 1960 to 1965.
- Francis Irv (2022–2026)
- Sidney Janis Gallery (died in 1989) since 1948
- Karma Gallery (Brendan Dugan), since 2011
- Kasmin Gallery, since 1989
- Sean Kelly Gallery, since 1991
- Anton Kern Gallery, since 1996
- Knoedler Gallery, from 1846 to 2011
- Koenig & Clinton Gallery (Leo Koenig and Margaret Liu Clinton) from 1999 to 2019
- Samuel M. Kootz Gallery from 1945-1966; Samuel Kootz (died 1982)
- Luhring Augustine Gallery, (Lawrence Luhring et Roland Augustine), since 1985
- Matthew Marks Gallery, since 1991
- Robert Miller Gallery (died in 2011), from 1977 to 2016
- Jason McCoy Gallery, since 1982
- Metro Pictures Gallery, (Janelle Reiring et Helene Winer), since 1980
- Greene Naftali Gallery (Carol Greene and Gloria Naftali), since 1995
- Nahmad Contemporary Gallery, (Joe Nahmad), since 2013
- Annina Nosei Gallery, from 1980 to 2006
- Pace Gallery, since 1960.
- Betty Parsons Gallery from 1946 to 1982, run by (Betty Parsons, 1900-1982)
- Salander-O'Reilly Galleries, from 1974 to 2007.
- Friederich Petzel Gallery, since 1994
- PPOW Gallery (Penny Pilkington & Wendy Olsoff), since 1983
- Andrea Rosen Gallery since 1990
- Salon 94 (Jeanne Greenberg Rohatyn), since 2002
- Tony Shafrazi Gallery from 1979 to 2014
- Jack Shainman Gallery, since 1984
- Holly Solomon Gallery (died in 2002), from 1975 to 2002
- Sonnabend Gallery (died in 2007), from 1970 to 2014
- Reena Spaulings Fine Art, since 2005
- Edward Thorp Gallery, since 1974
- Tibor de Nagy Gallery since 1950, (Tibor de Nagy died in 1993)
- Jack Tilton Gallery (died in 2017), since 1983
- Sperone Westwater, (Gian Enzo Sperone et Angela Westwater), since 1975
- Stephen Haller Gallery, from 1986 to 2013.
- Stux Gallery, Boston (1980-1988), New York since 1986
- The Project (Christian Haye), from 1998 to 2009
- Viana Art (André Viana), since 1996
- David Whitney Gallery, from 1969 to 1972
- Willard Gallery, from 1936 to 1987.
- Chase Contemporary, from 2017.

==== Saint Louis ====
- David Bruno Gallery, New York from 1983 to 2005; then Saint Louis, Missouri from 2005

==== San Francisco ====
- Anglim Trimble Gallery, formerly Gallery Paule Anglim, since 1972
- Berggruen Gallery, since 1970
- BlackMan's Art Gallery, from 1967 to 1974
- Catharine Clark Gallery, from 1991
- Don Soker Contemporary Art, from 1971
- Fraenkel Gallery, from 1979
- Gallery 16, from 1993
- Hosfelt Gallery, from 1996
- Jenkins Johnson Gallery, from 1996
- The McLoughlin Gallery, from 2010
- The Laundry SF, since 2015

==== Seattle ====
- Greg Kucera Gallery, since 1983
- Donald Young Gallery, from 1983 to 2014

=== Latin America ===
==== Brazil ====
- Baró Galeria, São Paulo since 2010
- Galeria Thomas Cohn, São Paulo from 1983 to 2011
- Galería Fortes D'Aloia & Gabriel, São Paulo since 1992
- Galería Luisa Strina, São Paulo since 1974

==== Colombia ====
- Alonso Garces Galeria (Alonso Garces and Aseneth Velázquez), Bogota since 1977

==== Mexico ====
- Kurimanzutto (Mónica Manzutto and José Kuri), Mexico City since 1999, New York since 2018
- Galería OMR (Patricia Ortiz Monasterio and Jaime Riestra), Mexico City since 1983

=== Commonwealth ===
==== Australia ====
- MARS (Melbourne Art Rooms) Gallery, Melbourne since 2004
- Christine Abrahams Gallery, Melbourne from 1980 to 2008
- Annandale Galleries (Bill and Anne Gregory), Sydney since 1991
- Philip Bacon Galleries, Fortitude Valley since 1974
- Michael Carr Gallery, Woollahra from 1994 to 2007
- Robin Gibson Gallery, Sydney since 1976
- Rex Irwin Gallery, Woollahra from 1976 to 2012
- King Street Gallery on William, Sydney since 1982
- Liverpool Street Gallery (James Erskine), Sydney since 2003
- Niagara Galleries (Peter Gant and William Nuttall), Melbourne since 1978
- Roslyn Oxley9 Gallery, Sydney since 1982
- Anna Schwartz Gallery, Melbourne since 1986
- Ames Yavuz, Singapore since 2010, Australia since 2019

==== New Zealand ====
- Peter McLeavey Gallery (died in 2015), Wellington from 1968 to 2015

==== South Africa ====
- Afronova Gallery (Henri Vergon and Emilie Démon), Johannesburg since 2005
- Stevenson Gallery (Michael Stevenson and David Brodie), Cape Town since 2003, Johannesburg since 2008

==== United Kingdom ====
- Sadie Coles HQ, London since 1997
- Pilar Corrias Gallery, London since 2008
- Corvi-Mora, London since 1996
- Cristea Roberts Gallery (Alan Cristea and David Cleaton-Roberts), London since 1995
- Laurent Delaye Gallery, London since 1996
- Faggionato Fine Arts (Anne Faggionato), London from 1994 to 2015
- Stephen Friedman Gallery, London since 1995
- Frith Street Gallery (Jane Hamlyn), London since 1989
- Michael Goedhuis Gallery, London since 2002
- Mica Gallery, London since 2007
- Greengrassi (Cornelia Grassi), London since 1997
- Grosvenor Vadehra Gallery, London since 2006
- Bernard Jacobson Gallery, London since 1969
- Modern Art (Stuart Shave), London since 1998
- The Modern Institute, Glasgow since 1997
- October Gallery (Chili Hawes), London since 1979
- Anthony d'Offay Gallery, London from 1965 to 2001
- Maureen Paley Gallery, London since 1984
- Piccadilly Gallery, London from 1953 to 2007
- Portland Gallery (Tom Hewlett), London since 1984
- Saatchi Gallery, London since 1985, turned into a museum in 2010
- Karsten Schubert Gallery (died en 2019), London since 1986
- The Sladmore Gallery, London since 1965
- Whitechapel Gallery, London since 1901 (not-for-profit educational charity)

=== Europe ===
==== European ====
- Thomas Dane Gallery, London since 2004, Naples since 2018
- Galerie Max Hetzler, Stuttgart (1974-1983), Cologne (1983-1993), Berlin since 1993, Paris since 2014, London since 2018
- Galerie Kamel Mennour, Paris since 1999, London since 2016
- Monitor, (Paola Capata), Roma since 2003, Lisbon since 2017, Pereto since 2019
- Victoria Miro Gallery, London since 1985, Venice since 2017
- Galerie Nathalie Obadia, Paris since 1993, Brussels since 2008
- Galerie Thaddaeus Ropac, Salzburg since 1983, Paris since 1990, Pantin since 2012, London since 2017
- Galerie Daniel Templon, Paris since 1966, Brussels since 2013
- Galerie Michel Rein, Tours from 1992 to 2000, Paris since 2000, Brussels since 2013
- Tornabuoni Art, (Roberto Casamonti), Florence since 1981, Crans Montana since 1993, Milan since 1995, Forte Dei Marmi since 2004, Paris since 2009, London since 2015
- Pastel Brush Gallery, Bucharest since 2023

==== Austria ====
- Galerie Meyer Kainer, Vienna since 1999
- Christine König Galerie, Vienna since 1990
- Galerie Ursula Krinzinger (de), Vienna since 1971
- Galerie Peter Pakesch, Vienna from 1981 to 1993

==== Belgium ====
- Galerie Aeroplastics contemporary (Jerome Jacobs), Brussels since 1998
- Galerie Fortlaan 17, Ghent, from 1989 to 2014
- Galerie Xavier Hufkens, Brussels since 1987
- Galerie Rodolphe Janssen, Brussels since 1991
- Galerie Greta Meert, Brussels since 1988
- Galerie Mulier Mulier, Knokke since 1988
- Guy Pieters Galleries, Knokke-Heist since 1981
- Galerie Micheline Szwajcer, Antwerp since 1981
- Zeno X Gallery (Frank Demaegd), Antwerp since 1981

==== Denmark ====
- Galleri Jens Faurschou, Copenhagen since 1986, turned into a foundation in 2011
- David Risley Gallery, Copenhagen from 2003 to 2018

==== France ====
- Galerie 1900-2000, (Marcel Fleiss), Paris since 1981 (joined by son David Fleiss since 1991)
- Galerie Art : Concept (fr) (Olivier Antoine), Nice frome 1992 to 1997, Paris since 1997
- Galerie Chantal Crousel (fr), Paris since 1980
- Galerie Farideh Cadot, Paris since 1976
- Galerie Pascal Cuisinier, Paris since 2006, decorative arts
- Galerie Gabrielle Maubrie (fr), Paris from 1977 to 2019
- Galerie Durand-Dessert, Paris from 1975 to 2002
- Galerie Laurent Godin, Paris, since 2005
- Galerie Hussenot, Paris since 1985
- Galerie kreo (fr) (Clémence and Didier Krzentowski), Paris since 1999
- Galerie Hervé Loevenbruck, Paris since 2001
- Galerie Loft (Jean-François Roudillon), Paris since 1985
- Galerie Magnin-A (André Magnin (fr)), Paris since 2009
- Galerie Gabrielle Maubrie (fr), Paris from 1977 to 2019
- Galerie mfc-Michèle Didier, Paris since 2012 (Brussels since 1987)
- Galerie Jérôme de Noirmont, Paris from 1994 to 2013
- Galerie Denise René (died in 2012), Paris since 1944
- Galerie Georges-Philippe et Nathalie Vallois, Paris since 1990
- Galerie Laurent Strouk (fr), Paris since 1986
- Galerie Suzanne Tarasiève, Paris since 2003
- Ricardo Fernandes Gallery, 132 - 140 Rue des Rosiers Marché Dauphine (galerie 95), 93400, Rue des Rosiers, 93400 Saint-Ouen-sur-Seine, Paris, France

==== Germany ====
- Arndt & Partner (Matthias Arndt), Berlin since 1994
- Berlinische Galerie, Berlin
- Galerie Isabella Bortolozzi, Berlin since 2004
- Galerie von Braunbehrens (Frank Molliné), Munich from 1978 to 2014, then Stuttgart since 2015
- Galerie Gisela Capitain (de), Cologne since 1986, Berlin since 2008
- Galerie Mehdi Chouakri, Berlin since 1996
- Contemporary Fine Arts (Bruno Brunnet and Nicole Hackert), Berlin since 1992
- Galerie Konrad Fischer, Dusseldorf since 1967, Berlin since 2007
- Barbara Gross Galerie (de), Munich from 1988 to 2020
- Jablonka Galerie (Rafael Jablonka) (de), Cologne since 1988
- Galerie Dennis Kimmerich, Düsseldorf from 2004 to 2010, NYC from 2010 to 2013, then Berlin since 2013
- Galerie Bernd Klüser (de), Munich since 1978
- Galerie Kraupa-Tuskany Zeidler (Amadeo Kraupa-Tuskany and Nadine Zeidler), Berlin since 2011
- Galerie Achim Kubinski, Stuttgart from 1979 to 1997
- Galerie Löhrl (de), Mönchengladbach since 1975
- Galerie Hans Mayer (de), Dusseldorf since 1971
- Galerie Nagel Draxler (de) (Christian Nagel & Saskia Draxler), Cologne since 1990, Berlin since 2002, Munich since 2019
- Galerie Neu (Alexander Schroeder and Thilo Wermke), Berlin since 1994
- Neugerriemschneider (Tim Neuger & Burkhard Riemschneider), Berlin since 1994
- Alexander Ochs Private, Berlin since 1997
- Produzentengalerie, Hamburg since 1973
- Galerie Aurel Scheibler, Cologne from 1991 to 2006, then Berlin since 2006

==== Greece ====
- Bernier-Eliades Gallery (Jean Bernier & Marina Eliades), Athens since 1977

==== Italy ====
- Galleria Alfonso Artiaco, Naples since 1986
- Galleria Cardi (Renato Cardi), Milan since 1972
- Galleria Raffaella Cortese, Milan since 1995
- Galleria Dep Art (Antonio Addamiano), Milan since 2006
- Galleria Emi Fontana, Milan from 1992 to 2009
- Galleria Paolo Gentili, Florence since 1991
- Galleria Giò Marconi, Milan since 1990
- Primo Marella Gallery, Milan since 2012
- Galleria Massimo Minini, Brescia since 1973
- Galleria Valentina Moncada, Rome since 1990
- Galleria Francesca Minini, Milan since 2006
- Galleria Lia Rumma, Naples since 1971, Milan since 1999
- Studio la Città (Hélène de Franchis), Verone since 1969
- Wizard Gallery (former Federico-Luger - FL Gallery), Milan since 2005

==== Luxembourg ====
- Zidoun-Bossuyt Gallery (Nordine Zidoun and Audrey Bossuyt), Luxembourg since 2008

==== Netherlands ====
- Andriesse & Eyck Gallery (Paul Andriesse & Zsa-Zsa Eyck), Amsterdam since 1984
- Art & Project (Geert van Beijeren & Adriaan van Ravesteijn), Amsterdam from 1968 to 2001

==== Portugal ====
- Galeria Presença, Porto since 1995

==== Spain ====
- ADN Galería (Miguel Angel Sánchez), Barcelona since 2003
- Galería Juana de Aizpuru, Madrid since 1983
- Galería Elba Benítez, Madrid since 1990
- Galería Javier Lopez & Fer Frances, Madrid since 1996
- Galería Angel Romero, Madrid from 1985 to 2011

==== Sweden ====
- Lars Bohman Gallery, Stockholm since 1982
- Galleri Magnus Karlsson (sv), Stockholm since 1997

==== Switzerland ====
- Thomas Ammann Fine Art, Zurich since 1977
- Galerie Bruno Bischofberger, Zurich since 1963
- Blondeau & Cie (Marc Blondeau), Geneva since 1987
- Galerie Andrea Caratsch, Zurich since 2006, St. Moritz since 2010
- Gowen Contemporary (Laura Gowen), Geneva since 2006
- Galerie Peter Kilchmann, Zurich since 1992
- Galerie Alice Pauli (fr), Lausanne since 1962
- Annemarie Verna Galerie, Zurich since 1969

=== Middle East and North Africa ===
==== Israël ====
- Zemack Contemporary Art (Shai Zemack), Tel Aviv since 2010

==== Turkey ====
- Arter since 2010
- Borusan Contemporary
- Dirimart (Hazer Özil), Istanbul since 2002
- İstanbul Modern since 2004
- Pera Museum
- Sakıp Sabancı Museum

=== Asia ===
==== Asian ====
- Pearl Lam Gallery, Hong Kong since 1992, Shanghai since 2005, Singapore since 2014
- ShanghART Gallery (Lorenz Helbling), Shanghai since 1996, Beijing since 2008, Singapore since 2012
- Ames Yavuz, Singapore since 2010, Australia since 2019

==== China ====
- Hanart TZ Gallery (Johnson Chang), Hong Kong since 1983
- Kwai Fung Hin Art Gallery (Catherine Kwai), Hong Kong since 1991
- Edouard Malingue Gallery, Hong Kong since 2010, Shanghai since 2016
- Schoeni Art Gallery (Manfred Schoeni and Nicole Schoeni), Hong Kong since 1992
- Soka Art Tainan (Hsiao Fuyuan), Tainan since 1992, Beijing since 2001, Taipei
- Spurs Gallery (Jia Wei and Sherry La), Beijing since 2005
- Yan Gallery (Fong Yuk Yan), Hong Kong since 2001

==== India ====
- Gallery Nature Morte (Peter Nagy (artist)), New Delhi since 1997, Calcutta from 2006 to 2009, Berlin from 2008 to 2014

==== Japan ====
- SCAI the Bathhouse (Masami Shiraishi), Tokyo since 1993
- Tomio Koyama Gallery, Tokyo since 1996
- Gallery Nomart (Satoshi Hayashi), Osaka since 1999
- Urano Gallery (Mutsumi Urano), Tokyo since 2007

==== Philippines ====
- Finale Art File (Vita Sarenas), Makati since 1982

==== Taiwan ====
- Michael Ku Gallery, Taipei since 2008
- Lin & Lin Gallery, Taipei since 1992

== See also ==
- Contemporary art gallery
- Art gallery
- List of contemporary art museums
