= Suela Cennet =

Turkish art gallerist (born 1985)

- Born: 1985 (age 40–41); Paris
- Education: literature and philosophy
- Occupations: literature and philosophy

Suela Cennet (born 1985, Paris) is the founder and executive director of The Pill, a contemporary art gallery based in Istanbul. Seen as a trailblazer gallerist, she debuted the careers and produced exhibitions of artists such as Apolonia Sokol, Soufiane Ababri, Eva Nielsen, Marion Verboom giving the gallery's program a strong connection with feminisms and notions of history, memory, displacement, domination, gender and race.

Besides her activities as an art dealer, Suela Cennet is a published author and curator.

== Career ==
Cennet was born and raised in Paris where she studied literature and philosophy at Hypokhâgne before shifting into International Relations and Political Science at Sciences Po Paris. Her family history is marked by a series of political exiles. She moved to Istanbul in 2013 to initiate The Pill.

Upon graduation, Suela Cennet was already developing her project of building a sustainable naval platform to showcase art when Parisian art dealer Daniel Templon hired her as director in charge of international development. There, she worked with artists such as Jim Dine, Wim Delvoye, Juliao Sarmento, Chiharu Shiota, Sudarshan Shetty, Jitish Kalat, Jean-Michel Alberola, Kehinde Wiley and Joel Shapiro; oversaw the gallery's expansion in Brussels and began preparing to open her own gallery.

In 2016, Cennet opened The Pill in Istanbul, Turkey, home to her father, due to the cosmopolitanism of the city "a very colorful and mysterious city where there is no end to exploration", and in order to "explore new territories where the relationship to art is different". Focusing on the emerging French, Turkish, Mediterranean and Latin American artists such as Eva Nielsen, Apolonia Sokol, Soufiane Ababri, Pablo Davila, Ozlem Altin and Leyla Gediz, the gallery quickly became celebrated for its curated program, its dynamic art fair participations across Europe, North and South America such as Arco Madrid, Material Mexico City, Expo Chicago, Untitled Miami, Art Basel Paris where her proposals often were awarded by prizes. In this timeframe, Suela Cennet established partnerships with leading cultural institutions such as AWARE Foundation for Women Artists, Bourse Emerige Révélations, SAHA and the French curators' association C-E-A to support the careers of the gallery's growing list of artists; and also private institutions such as Fondation Hermès, LVMH who sourced three of their first laureates for the Metiers d'Art Residency program Marion Verboom, Raphael Barontini and Eva Nielsen.

In 2022, following several pop-up exhibitions in Paris, the gallery and JBE books published a book celebrating the first six years of programming with contributions from Ingrid Luquet-Gad, Suela Cennet and represented artists.

In 2024, Cennet expanded the gallery to Paris. The new 300-sqm space — situated in the historic heart of the city — brought the gallery’s curatorial vision to this art capital. Its inaugural exhibition was Apolonia Sokol’s first monographic show in France; it was launched in parallel with T H E P I L L®’s debut at Art Basel Paris, where the gallery presented works by Golden Lion laureate Nil Yalter.

In 2025, Suela Cennet was listed amongst the most influential business leaders in the art world in the prestigious Apollo 40 ranking by the Apollo (magazine).
