= Christopher D'Arcangelo =

American artist

Christopher D’Arcangelo (23 January 1955 – 28 April 1979) was an American artist who worked in the 1970s until his death in 1979. He was the son of the American painter Allan D'Arcangelo.

== Career ==
=== Anarchy protests ===
In 1975, he performed a series of unauthorized actions in the major museums in New York City: the Whitney Museum, the Museum of Modern Art, the Guggenheim Museum, and the Metropolitan Museum. Each action was accompanied by a written statement stenciled on his back: "When I state that I am an anarchist I must also state that I am not an anarchist to be in keeping with the […] definition of anarchism. Long live anarchism." The word anarchism at the end of the first sentence and the entire second sentence were stenciled upside down.

The first action at the Whitney Museum, in February 1975, during the Whitney Biennial, consisted in chaining himself with a case-hardened chain and locks to the doors at the main entrance of the museum. D'Arcangelo remained shackled to the doors with his back exposed to visitors arriving on the museum's entrance ramp for around an hour, thus obstructing access to and from the museum. He performed two further illicit actions, in 1976, at the Norton Simon Museum in Pasadena, CA and, in 1978, at the Louvre in Paris.

=== Exhibitions ===
In January 1977, he published a proposal "LAICA as an Alternative to Museums" in the journal of the now defunct Los Angeles Institute of Contemporary Art. In the late 1970s, D'Arcangelo collaborated with the artist Peter Nadin, in a series of works (in the form of contracts and documentation) in which they presented their day labor refurbishing loft spaces, principally in Lower Manhattan, as "a means of surviving in a capitalist economy." Although the typewritten documentation, which the two artists sent out as circulars, included an invitation to view the finished work, no explicit claim was made that the results of their labor, what they termed "functional constructions", represented artworks as such.

The collaboration culminated in an evolving group exhibition at 84 West Broadway which opened on 9 November 1978. The exhibition began with a presentation of an empty exhibition space, entitled 30 Days Work, in reference to the amount of labor the two artists (along with fellow laborer Nick Lawson) had invested in refurbishing the space as a gallery. The first in a series of invitation cards announcing the exhibition was headed with the statement: "The work shown in this space is a response to the existing conditions and or work previously shown in the space."

The artists who subsequently added work to the evolving project included in the following order: Daniel Buren, Sean Scully, Jane Reynolds, Peter Fend, and Rhys Chatham (who premiered his recently composed Guitar Trio, with Glenn Branca and Nina Canal, from the no-wave group Ut). The exhibition culminated in a group work, following D'Arcangelo's death, in which Dan Graham, Louise Lawler, Peter Nadin, and Lawrence Weiner, stenciled their names on the gallery floor.

In September 1978, D'Arcangelo took part in a group exhibition, along with Louise Lawler, Adrian Piper and Cindy Sherman, curated by Janelle Reiring at Artists Space. This was the first exhibition to include Sherman's acclaimed Untitled Film Stills. D'Arcangelo's contribution took the form of a written statement, entitled "Four texts for Artists Space". The texts were printed on four pages following the layout of the exhibition catalog and displayed on the gallery walls. It included a detailed description and critique of the status of Artists Space as an independent gallery, or "artists' space" as its name implies. As a pendant to his critique, D'Arcangelo left his name off all promotional material destined to circulate outside the gallery. This included a blank space on the invitation card. Likewise, four blank pages were included in the catalog.

From 1976 until his death, he was working on an exhibition proposal for the Van Abbemuseum in Eindhoven.

In 1991, the artist Christopher Williams produced a work Bouquet for Bas Jan Ader and Christopher D'Arcangeo… 1991. Further references to D'Arcangelo have been included in recent works by the artists Ben Kinmont and Mario García Torres.

== After death acclaim ==
In recent years, D'Arcangelo's work has begun to be recognized as an important contribution to what has, in current art history, been termed institutional critique.

== Press ==
- "Fales Library and Special Collections, "Guide to the Christopher D'Arcangelo Papers 1965-2003." Guide to the Christopher D'Arcangelo Papers 1965-2003, August 2012"
- "Ochmanek, Annie, "Forcible Remove." Artforum, January 2012"
- "Hirsch, Faye, "Return to Anarchy: Christopher D'Arcangelo." Art in America, October 2011"
- "Cotter, Holland, "Art in Review: Christopher D’Arcangelo." The New York Times, October 2011"
