= Kvæsthusgade =

Street in Copenhagen, Denmark

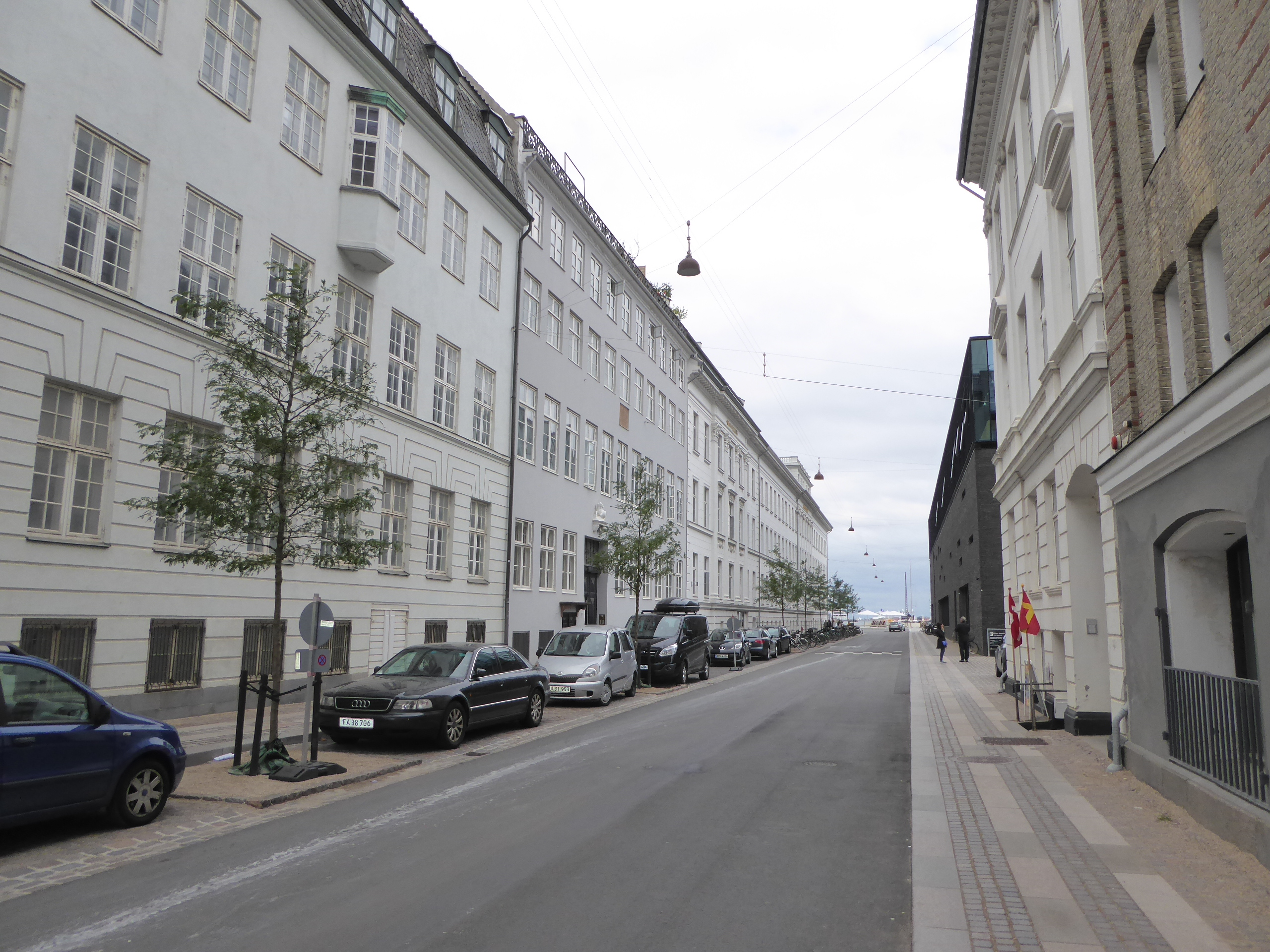
- Length: 159 m (522 ft)
- Location: Copenhagen, Denmark
- Quarter: City centre
- Nearest metro station: Kongens Nytorv
- Coordinates: 55°40′48.16″N 12°35′37.7″E
- Southwest end: Nyhavn
- Northeast end: Sankt Annæ Plads

Kvæsthusgade is a short street in the Nyhavn Quarter of central Copenhagen, Denmark. It runs from the mouth of the Nyhavn canal in the south to Ofelia Plads in the north. The rear side of the Royal Danish Playhouse dominates the east side of the street.

The Zinn House at No. 3 and the neighbouring building at No. 5 are both listed on the Danish registry of protected buildings and places.

== History ==
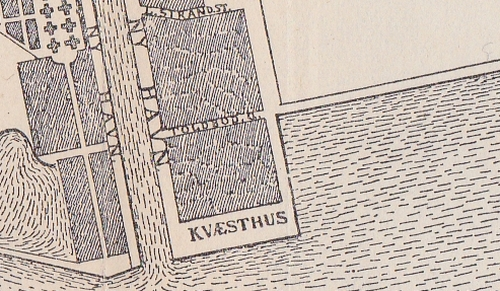
The location of the Kvæsthus seen on a map detail from the 1690s

The street takes its name after the Kvæsthus, a military hospital, which relocated to the site in 1680. It is known that a hospital for boatsmen was founded in 1618 and it was then most likely situated at the Church of Holmen. It was moved to Gothersgade in 1628 and again in 1658 to Sejlhuset at Bremerholm. In 1668, the hospital moved to Børnehuset in Christianshavn and in 1675 to Guldhuset in Rigensgade.

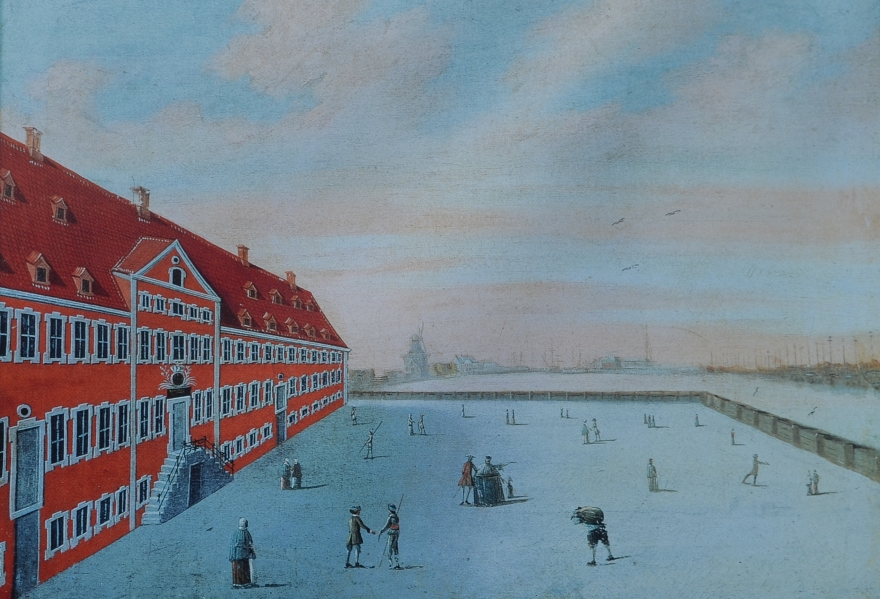
Kvæsthuset in c. 1750

The name Kvæsthus was introduced with the inauguration of the new building for the institution at the corner of present-day Kvæsthusgade and Sankt Annæ Plads in 1685. It was designed by Hans van Steenwinckel the Youngest. The institution was later split into a Søkvæsthus for the Navy which remained in the old building and a Landkvæsthus for the Army, which took over Københavns Ladegård, a former farm under Copenhagen Castle.

The naval hospital relocated to the so-called Søkvæsthuset building on Christianshavn in 1777. The building in Kvæsthusgade was then for a while used as a warehouse for textiles that arrived to Copenhagen by ship. In 1827, the building came into use as military barracks. In 1872, it was acquired by DFDS. An area on the east side of the street was reclaimed and the Kvæsthusbroen Pier was built to increase the quayside area and the number of ships that could dock at the site.

== Notable buildings ==
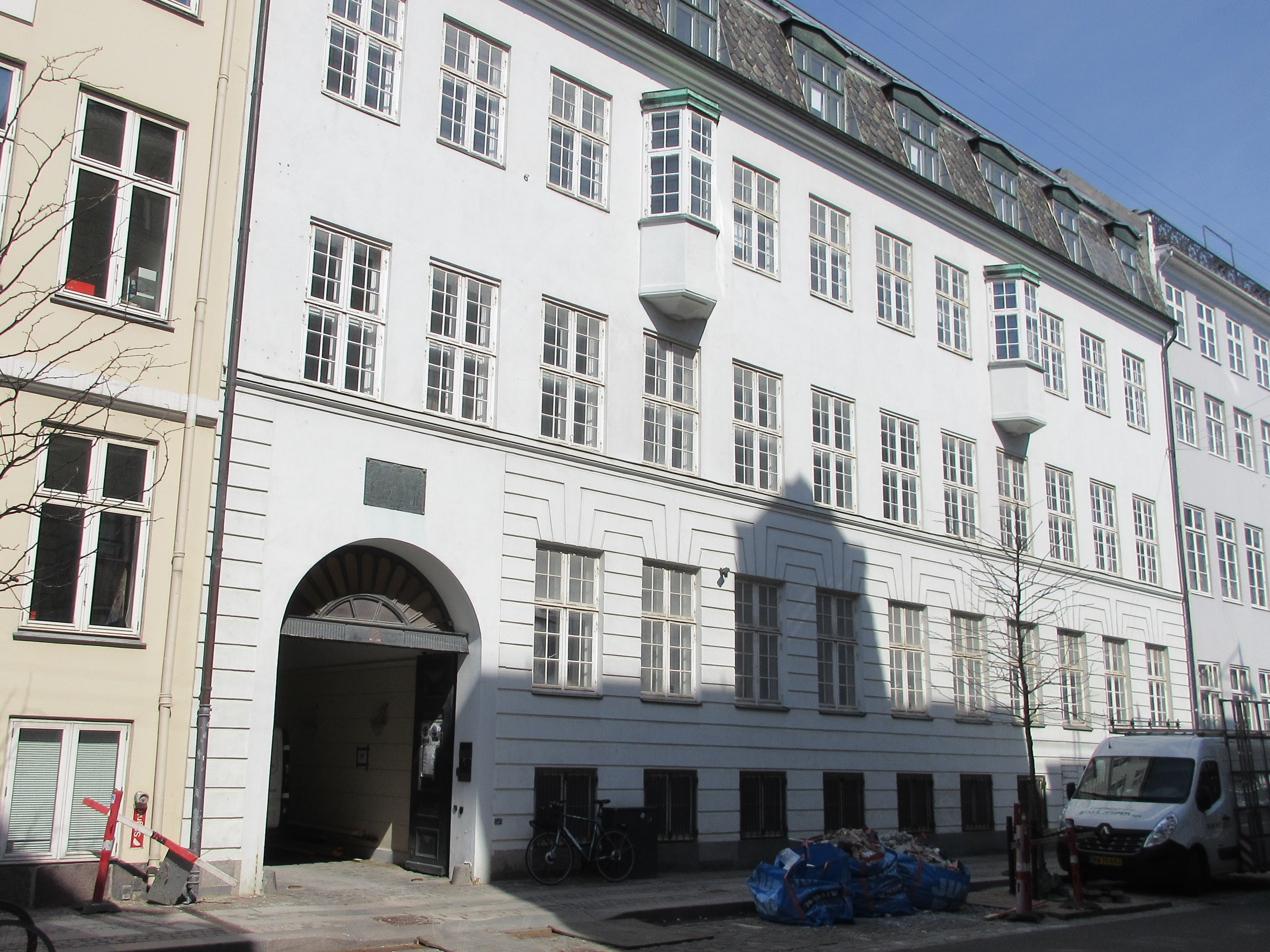
No. 3: The Zinn House

No. 1 was built in 1884–1886 with cellar og three storeys for J. P. von Osten. It was later used as headquarters for Em. Z. Svitzers Bjergningsenterprise.

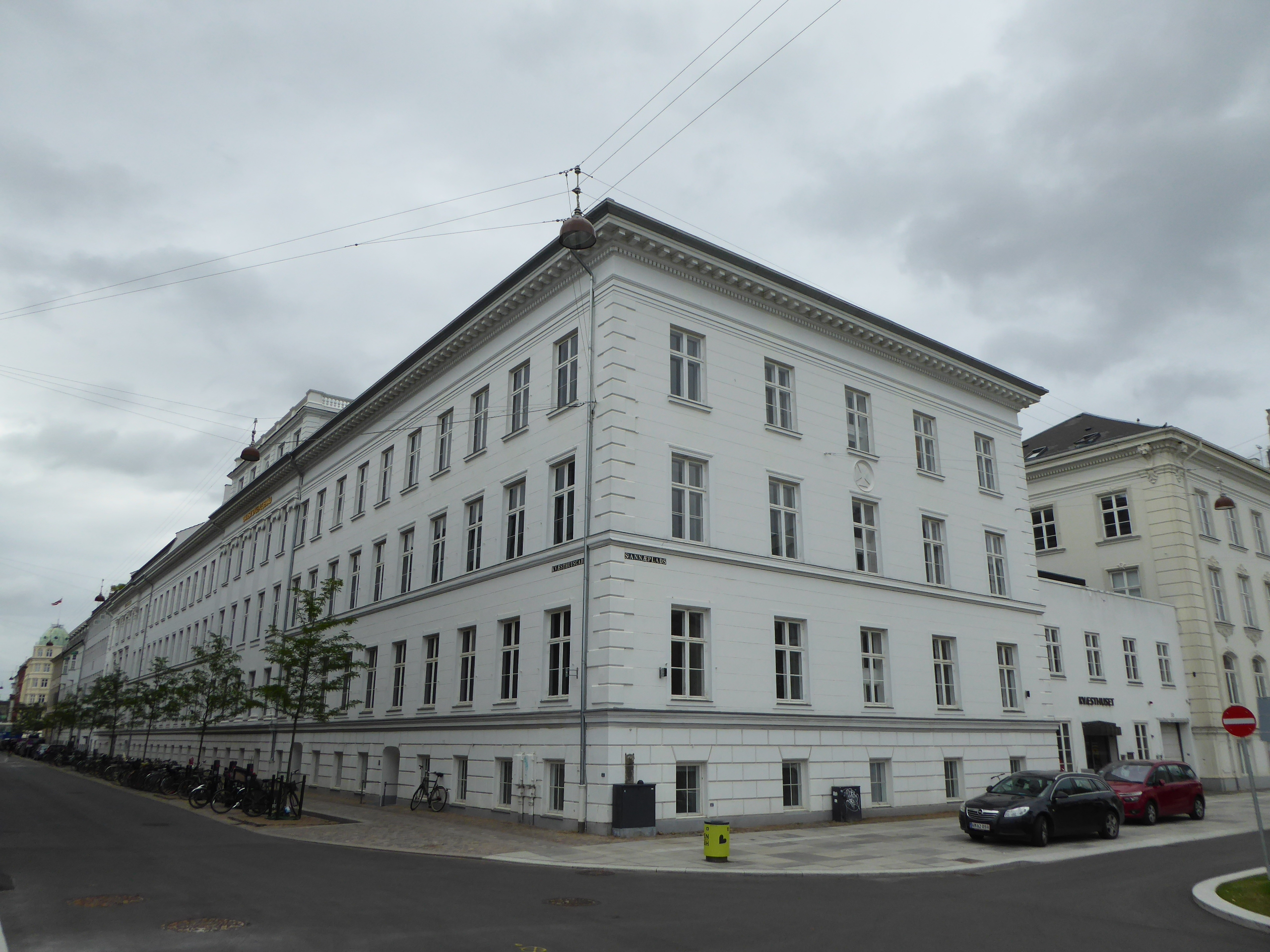
No.7-11: The Danish Nurses' Headquarters

The Zinn House (No. 3) is from 1751 and was owned by members of the wealthy Zinn family for more than 150 years. No. 5 is from 1736 and was built for royal cellar master Ph. Jacob Zalathe and later heightened by two storeys in 1845. Danish Documentary Production is based in the building. No. 3 and No. 5 are both listed on the Danish registry of protected buildings and places.

The former Kvæsthus Building (No. 7-11) is now home to the Danish Nurses' Organization. The building was adapted for DFDS in 1872.

== See also ==
- Em. Z. Svitzers Bjergningsenterprise
