= Ted Purves =

- Born: 1964; New York City
- Died: July 4, 2017 (aged 52–53); Berkeley, CA
- Known for: Art education, Contemporary Art,
- Notable work: Temescal Amity Works, Momentary Academy
- Movement: Social Practice
- Awards: Creative Capital Foundation, Evelyn and Walter Haas Foundation

Ted Purves (1964 – July 4, 2017) was an American artist, educator, and independent curator living in Oakland, California. He was the chair of the Social Practice graduate program at the California College of the Arts in San Francisco, California. Central to Purves' interests were the gift economy, and the distribution of free goods and services by artists.

== Publications ==
Purves edited What We Want Is Free: Generosity and Exchange in Recent Art, published by SUNY Press in 2005. It includes essays by curators Bill Arning, Kate Fowle and Lars Bang Larsen, Mary Jane Jacob and artists Ben Kinmont, Jörgen Svensson, Guy Overfelt, Jeanne van Heeswijk, and an interview with Cesare Pietroiusi by Shane Aslan Selzer. It also includes a Projects Histories section with short descriptions of dozens of related projects.

== The Momentary Academy ==
The Momentary Academy was a temporary school realized at the Yerba Buena Center for the Arts, during the Bay Area Now 4 exhibition. It offered free classes to the public led by artists in the exhibition. Classes involved practical as well as experimental subjects, and ranged from single workshop sessions to weekly meetings.

== Temescal Amity Works ==
Temescal Amity Works is a public project in Oakland, California involving the free distribution of locally grown fruit, and the exchange of information and services in a neighborhood diverse in race and class that is in the process of redefining itself amidst the pressures of gentrification and development.
