= MICA Gallery =

Islamic art gallery in the UK

Coordinates: 51°29′35″N 0°9′31″W

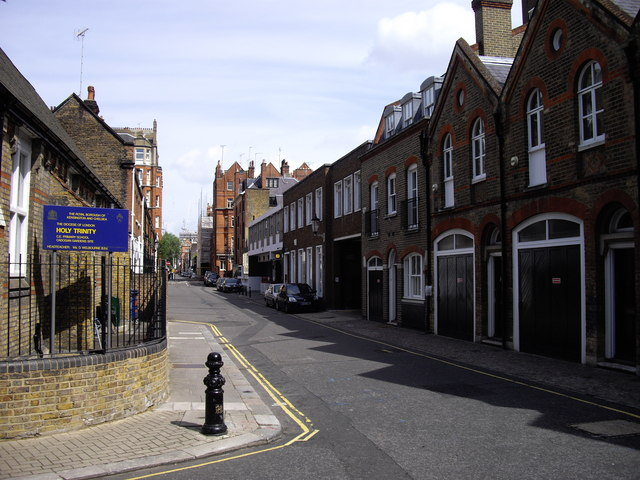
- Pavilion Road, MICA Gallery is on the right

- Location within Greater London
- Established: 2007
- Location: Pavilion Road, [ Knightsbridge, London, UK
- Founder: Reedah El-Saie

MICA Gallery is an art gallery located near the Cadogan Gardens junction on Pavilion Road, Knightsbridge, London, England.

It was the first gallery in the United Kingdom to focus on modern Islamic art.

== Description and nomenclature ==
MICA is an abbreviation of Modern Islamic and Contemporary Art.

The gallery is 1,500 square feet (140 m^{2}) in size and specialises in Modern Islamic and Contemporary art.

== History ==
The gallery was founded by Reedah El-Saie in 2007. It was the first gallery in the United Kingdom to focus on modern Islamic art.

El-Saie, is a British-Pakistani barrister married to an Egyptian in London, and has used the gallery to promote the work of young British-Pakistani artists such as Nurjan, Khaver Idrees, Maaida Noor, and Shafaq Ahmed.

== Exhibitions ==
In 2010, the gallery exhibited work by British visual artist Lateefa Spiker. In July 2011 the gallery hosted the recent Egyptian art exhibition From Facebook to Nassbook. The exhibition was dedicated to the memory of the Egyptian artist Ahmed Bassiony, who died in sniper fire during the 2011 Egyptian revolution. The same year, the gallery exhibited calligraphy by Iranian artist Hamid Ajami.

Ashraf Fodais's 2012 installation Stones from Tahrir Square was described as "quietly and majestically thought-provoking" by Ben East, writing in The National. Also in 2012, the gallery hosted The Brit Pak exhibition of emerging British Pakistan artists' work.
