= The Pill Gallery =

Contemporary art gallery in Istanbul, Turkey

The Pill Gallery is a contemporary art gallery based in the historical peninsula of Istanbul, Turkey. It was founded and is directed by Suela Cennet, operating as a platform that brings together local and international artists.

== History ==
The Pill was founded in January 2016 by Suela Cennet who had previously worked with Daniel Templon in Paris and Brussels. Its inaugural exhibition was a solo presentation by French artist Daniel Firman, followed by a solo presentation by Eva Nielsen.

Since its opening, the gallery has established itself as one of the "most influential" players in the region and a "reference to discover the emerging artistic scene". It was featured in the Istanbul City guides published by Phaidon for Wallpaper as well as Louis Vuitton as one of the most cutting-edge galleries in the city.

The Pill was among the institutional partners of Bourse Emerige Révélations in 2017 and 2018, a prize and long-term support mechanism for emerging French artists. It has participated in leading international art fairs such as ARCO Madrid, Material Art Fair Mexico City, Expo Chicago, Untitled Miami, 1:54 New York, Art-O-Rama Marseille, Paris Photo, FIAC Paris and Contemporary Istanbul. The Pill's art fair participation has been awarded multiple times, winning the Opening Award for best stand at ARCO Madrid 2021 and Best Booth Design Award for Contemporary Istanbul in 2016. Its participation at Future Fair 2021, New York, was deemed "standout" by multiple reviews.

In 2022, "New Art Scales", a book revisiting the gallery's first seven years of programming, was published by JBE Books with contributions by art critic Ingrid Luquet-Gad and Suela Cennet.

== Artists ==
The following artists have been exhibited at the gallery:

- Soufiane Ababri
- Ozlem Altin
- Mireille Blanc
- Pablo Davilá
- Berke Doganoglu
- Elif Erkan
- Louis Gary
- Leyla Gediz
- Irem Günaydin
- Eva Nielsen (artist)
- Elsa Sahal
- Ugo Schiavi
- Apolonia Sokol
- Marion Verboom
