= Apolonia, Apolonia =

2022 documentary film by Lea Glob

- Promotional poster
- Directed by: Lea Glob
- Written by: Lea Glob
- Produced by: Sidsel Lønvig Siersted; Malgorzata Staron
- Starring: Apolonia Sokol; Lea Glob
- Cinematography: Lea Glob; Maggie Olkuska; Magda Bojdo
- Edited by: Andreas Bøggild Monies; Thor Ochsner
- Music by: Jonas Struck
- Production companies: Danish Documentary Production; HBO Max Central Europe; Staron Film
- Release dates: November 2022 (IDFA); 23 March 2023 (Denmark)
- Running time: 116 minutes
- Countries: Denmark; Poland; France
- Languages: Danish; French; English; Polish; Russian
- Box office: US$$6,207

Apolonia, Apolonia is a 2022 documentary film directed by Lea Glob. The film is a coming-of-age story of a girl who finds her place in the art world, narrated through 13 years. The film, produced by Danish Documentary Production, HBO Max Central Europe and Staron Film, won the IDFA Award for Best Film at the 35th International Documentary Film Festival Amsterdam in international competition in November 2022. It was one of the 15 finalist films in the December shortlists for Best Documentary Feature at the 96th Academy Awards.

A Denmark, Poland and France co-production, the film was released in Denmark cinemas on 23 March 2023.

== Content ==
The film follows the journey of Apolonia Sokol, a gifted artist who was born in a Parisian underground theater and raised in a vibrant French artistic scene with a group of bohemians and hippies in the 1990s. She got into the Beaux-Arts de Paris when she was 21. Lea Glob, a Danish filmmaker, met her in France in 2009 and was intrigued by her adventurous life. Lea kept filming Apolonia over the years, as Apolonia tried to carve out her space in the art world and dealt with the challenges and pleasures of being a woman, relating to others, accepting her body and expressing her creativity. After thirteen years, the two women share their insights on each other's lives in this documentary film about art, love, motherhood, sexuality, representation and how to thrive as a woman in a world ruled by patriarchy, capitalism and war without losing one's identity.

== Cast ==
- Apolonia Sokol
- Lea Glob
- Oksana Shachko
- Aleksandra Tlolka
- Hervé Breuil

== Release ==
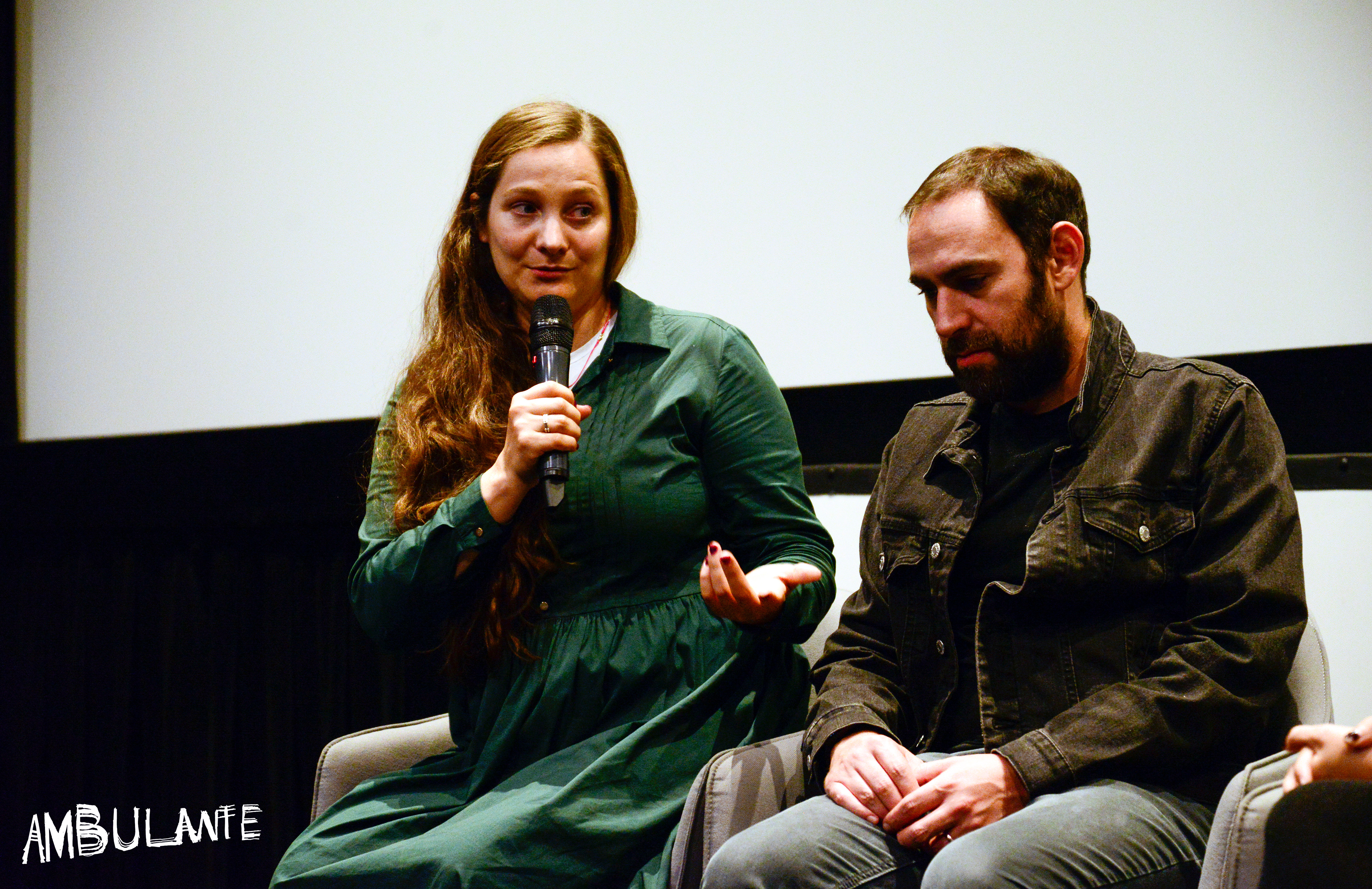
Director Lea Glob at a showing at Festival Ambulante

The film had its world premiere on 10 November 2022 at the 35th International Documentary Film Festival Amsterdam in international competition, where it won IDFA Award for Best Film. It was screened at Thessaloniki Documentary Festival in the first week of March 2023. On 19 March 2023, it was screened at the Sofia International Film Festival in International Documentary Competition section.

The film competed at the 47th Hong Kong International Film Festival in 'Documentary Competition' and won the Firebird Award in April 2023. The film was screened at the Tribeca Festival in Viewpoints section for its North American premiere on 8 June 2023.

The film was also screened at 2023 BFI London Film Festival in the 'Strand' section under the 'Create' theme on 6 October 2023.

In January 2024, the North American rights of the film were acquired by Grasshopper Film and Documentary+. The film was released in DCTV’s Firehouse Cinema in New York, and launched on streaming platform Documentary+ on January 12, 2024.

The film was released in French theaters on 27 March 2024.

== Reception ==
On the review aggregator Rotten Tomatoes website, the film has an approval rating of 88% based on 25 reviews, with an average rating of 7.1/10. On Metacritic, it has a weighted average score of 77 out of 100 based on 8 reviews, indicating "generally favorable reviews".

Guy Lodge, reviewing at IDFA (Competition) for Variety, wrote, "Sokol’s paintings, slightly distorted large-scale portraits of human subjects in eerie states of repose, are striking, but never quite as intriguing as their restless, endlessly self-doubting creator." Marta Bałaga's review in Cineuropa wrote, "Glob can’t take her eyes off this woman, whether she is celebrating, breaking down or cutting her own bangs, and the feeling is frankly contagious." Lovia Gyarkye for Hollywood Reporter described the film as "A heartfelt reflection on a fitful artistic journey." Gyarkye closing the review wrote, "Apolonia is no longer just a subject but a confidant, and she pulled not only Glob but us, too, into her orbit." Neil Young writing in Screen International felt that the film was "The absorbingly intimate portrait of an artist as a young woman over the transformative span of 13 years."

== Accolades ==
Award	Date of ceremony	Category	Recipient(s)	Result	Ref.
IDFA	17 November 2022	Best Feature Length documentary	Apolonia, Apolonia	Won	
Göteborg International Film Festival	5 February 2023	Dragon Award Best Nordic Documentary	Apolonia, Apolonia	Won	
Sofia International Film Festival	25 March 2023	Best Documentary Award	Apolonia, Apolonia	Won	
CPH:DOX	26 March 2023	Politiken DOX-Award	Apolonia, Apolonia	Won	
One World Film Festival	31 March 2023	Best Film	Apolonia, Apolonia	Won	
Hong Kong International Film Festival	9 April 2023	Firebird Award	Apolonia, Apolonia	Won	
Millennium Docs Against Gravity	1 June 2023	Grand Prix - Bank Millennium Award	Apolonia, Apolonia	Won	
Gotham Independent Film Awards	November 27, 2023	Best Documentary	Apolonia, Apolonia	Nominated	
European Film Awards	9 December 2023	Best European Documentary	Apolonia, Apolonia	Nominated	
IDA Documentary Awards	12 December 2023	Best Feature Documentary	Apolonia, Apolonia	Nominated	
IDA Documentary Awards	12 December 2023	Best Director	Lea Glob	Nominated	
IDA Documentary Awards	12 December 2023	Best Editing	Andreas Bøggild Monies, Thor Ochsner	Nominated	
IDA Documentary Awards	12 December 2023	Best Writing	Lea Glob, Andreas Bøggild Monies	Nominated	
Robert Award	3 February 2024	Best Documentary Feature	Apolonia, Apolonia	Won	
Robert Award	3 February 2024	Best Editing	Andreas Bøggild Monies, Thor Ochsner	Won	
Robert Award	3 February 2024	Best Score	Jonas Struck	Won	
Robert Award	3 February 2024	Best Director	Lea Glob	Won	
Robert Award	3 February 2024	Best Sound design	Anna Zarnecka-Wójcik, Jacques Pedersen	Won	
Bodil Awards	16 March 2024	Bodil Award for Best Documentary	Apolonia, Apolonia	Won	

=== Listicle ===
Publisher	Year	Listicle	Placement	Ref.
Variety	2023	Winner's Circle at Doc NYC	Included	
17th Cinema Eye Honors	2023	The Unforgettables	Included	

== See also ==
- Academy Award for Best Documentary Feature Film
- Submissions for the Academy Award for Best Documentary Feature
