= The Chelsea Townhouse =

Luxury hotel in London

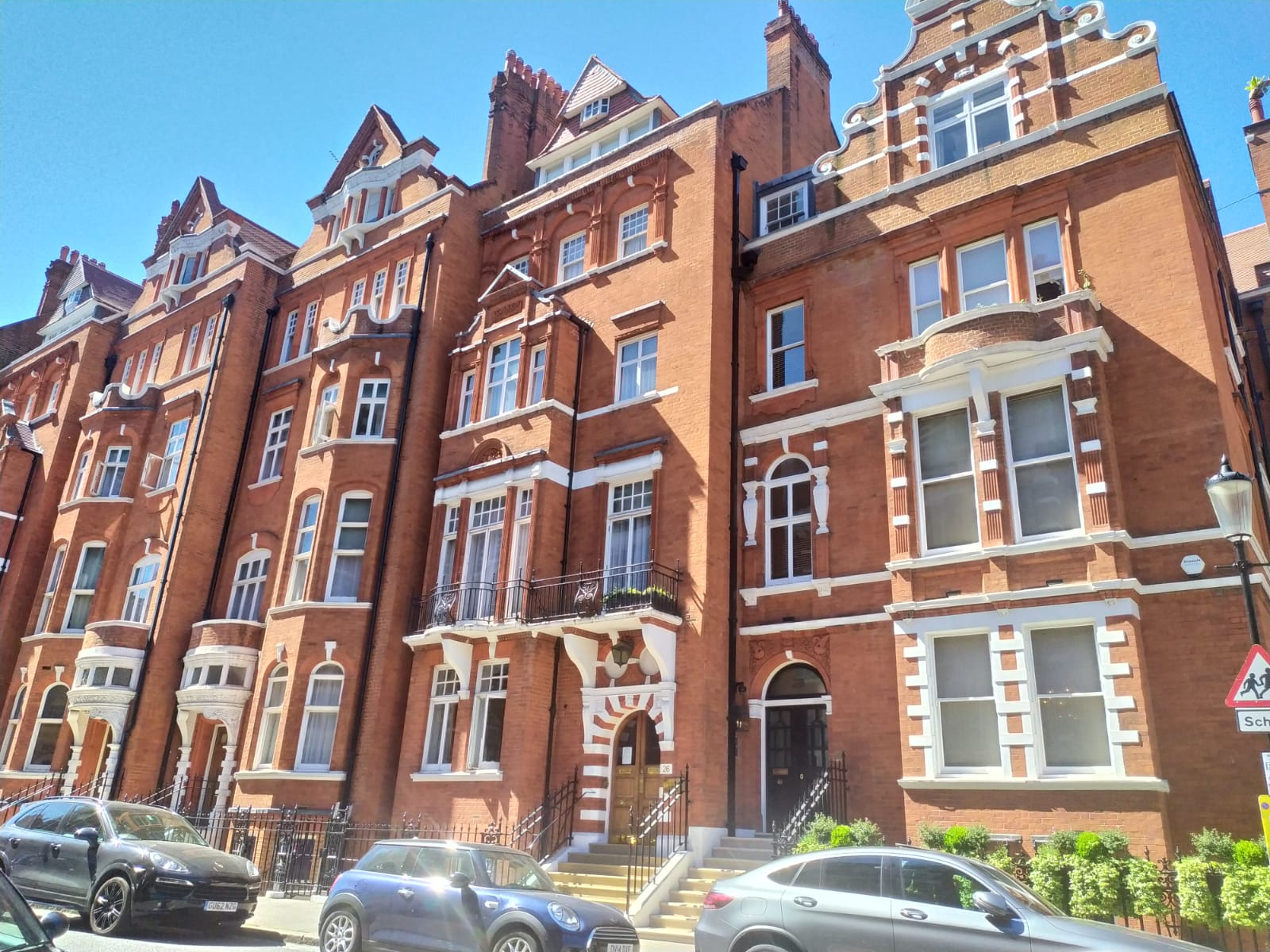
- The front façade on Cadogan Gardens

- Location within Central London
- Former names: Draycott Hotel
- Hotel chain: Iconic Hotels & Resorts

General information
- Location: 26 Cadogan Gardens; London, England
- Coordinates: 51°29′34.84″N 0°9′34.46″W
- Opened: September 2023
- Affiliation: Relais & Châteaux

Other information
- Number of rooms: 25
- Number of suites: 11
- Number of restaurants: 1

Website
- thechelseatownhouse.com

The Chelsea Townhouse is a 5-star boutique hotel in London, England. It was previously known as the Draycott Hotel before being refurbished to its present form starting in 2022. The current hotel opened in September 2023, and it is part of the Iconic Hotels & Resorts group.

== Location ==
The hotel is located in a group of three neighbouring townhouses that were originally built during the late 19th century. The hotel's main entrance is at 26 Cadogan Gardens in the Chelsea area of West London. It is situated near Sloane Square and the King's Road.

== Notable guests ==
Previous guests have included Queen Margrethe II of Denmark, Gary Oldman and Pierce Brosnan.
