= Kvæsthusgade 5 =

Historic property in Kvæsthusgade, Copenhagen, Denmark

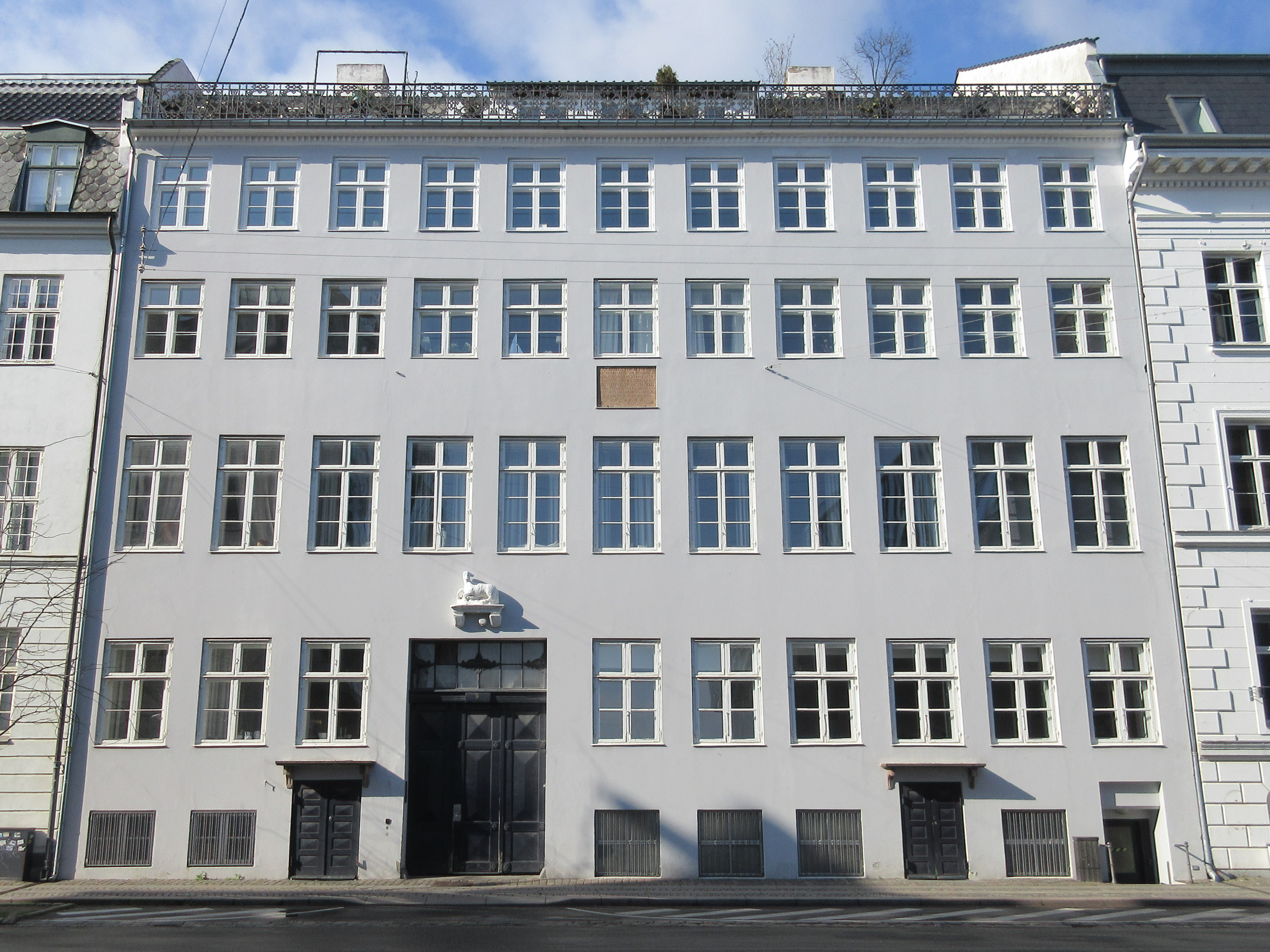
- Kvæsthusgade 5 in 2020
- Interactive map of the Kvæsthusgade 5 area

General information
- Location: Copenhagen, Denmark
- Coordinates: 55°40′47.57″N 12°35′36.6″E
- Completed: 1736
- Renovated: 1845

Kvæsthusgade 5 is a historic property in Kvæsthusgade, a short street between the Nyhavn canal and Sankt Annæ Plads, in central Copenhagen, Denmark. The building is listed in the Danish registry of protected buildings and places. Notable former residents include the military officer Christian de Meza, composer Niels Gade. painter Anna Petersen and art historian Troels Troels-Lund.

== History ==
=== 18th century ===
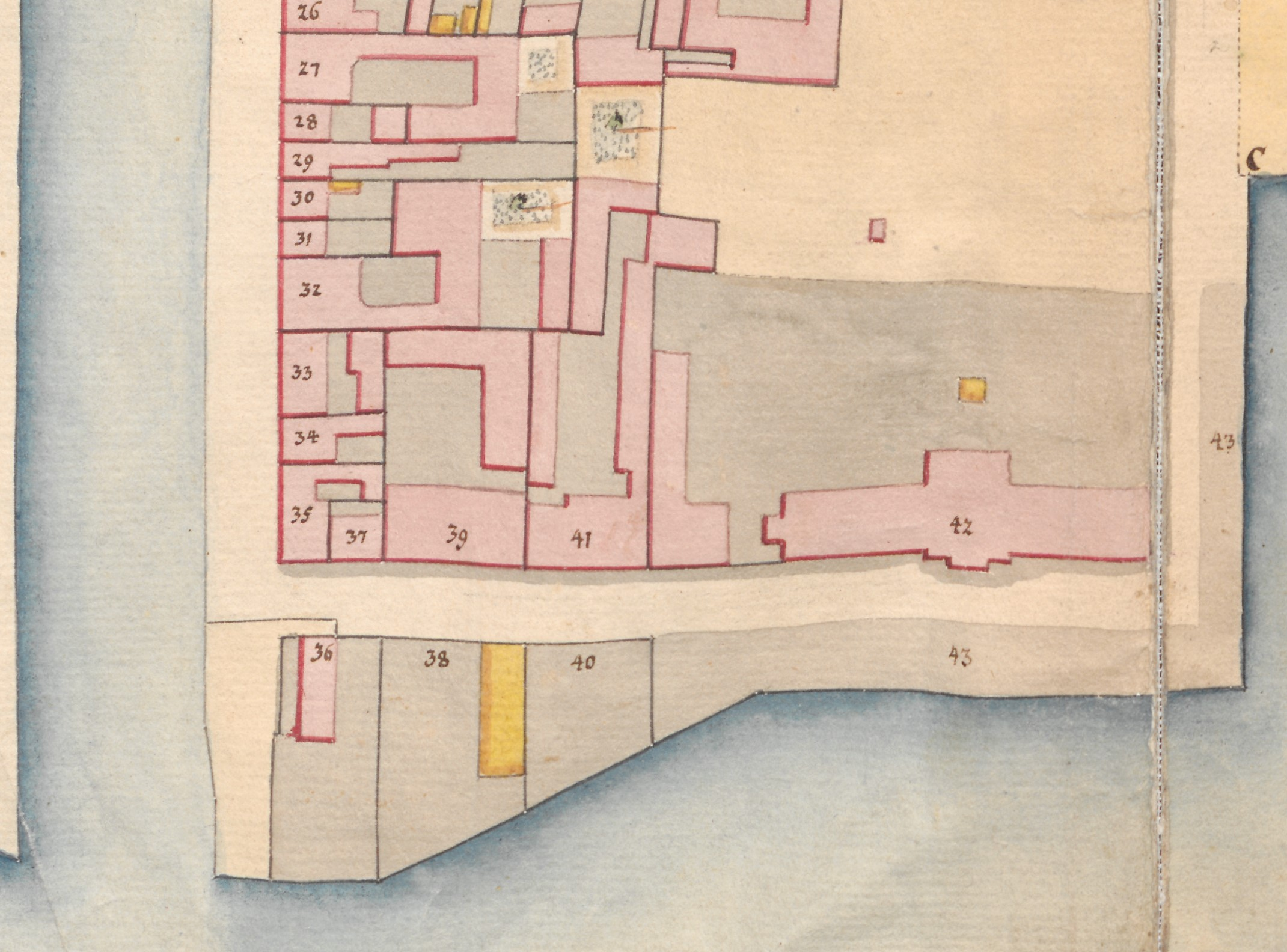
No. 39 seen in a detail from Christian Gedde's map of St. Ann's East Quarter, 1757

The site was part of a larger property in the late 17th century. This property was listed as No. 22 in St. Ann's East Quarter in Copenhagen's first cadastre of 1689. The present building on the site was constructed with two storeys over a walk-out basement in 1736 for royal cellarman (vinkyper) Ph. Jacob Zalathe. It was heightened by two floors in 1845. The property was listed as No. 41 in the new cadastre of 1756 and was then owned by one kommerceråd Courtenne.

=== Han Friis ===
The property was later acquired by wholesaler (grosserer) Hans Friis. His property was home to a total of 38 residents in four households at the time of the 1801 census. The owner resided in the building with his wife Lovise Haagensen, their eight children (aged two to 14), his mother Anne Friis, two lodgers, a caretaker, a male servant, three maids and a wet nurse. Christian Faber Birch (1769-1837), another merchant (grosserer), resided in the building with his wife Christiane Liebenberg, their two children (aged two and five), an office clerk, a caretaker and two maids. Casper Jochumsen, a sailor and barkeeper, resided in the building with his wife Anne Larsdattewr, their two daughters (aged one and four) and one maid. Jens Kragelund, another barkeeper, resided in the building with his wife Maren K. Schow and their four children (aged eight to 16).

The property was again listed as No. 41 in the new cadastre of 1806. It was at that time still owned by Hans Friis.

Peter Christian Knudtzon and his wife Marie (née Thomsen) had their first home together on the ground floor of the building. They moved in 1813 to the first-floor apartment at Amaliegade 4 (later known as Domus Medica).

=== 1834 census ===
The property was home to 42 residents in six households at the 1834 census. Caspar Johannes von Benzon, an army captain and director of the fire corps on Møn, resided on the ground flor with his wife Wilhelmine Conradine (née Giese), their two children (aged one to three) and one maid. The younger of the two daughters, Anna, would later marry the painter Carsten Henrichsen. Johan Gudmann (1786-1858), a merchant trading in Iceland, resided on the first floor with his wife Anna Cathrine (née Hyll), their four children (aged five to 17), his mother Ane Marie Gudmann and two maids. Jens Christian Lund, a merchant, resided on the first floor of the side wing with his wife Cathrine Elisabeth Ladensach and the lodger Fritz Welleius. Joachim Topp, a senior clerk (fuldmægtig) at Frederiksfeld Glassworks, resided on the second floor with his wife Elisabeth (née Nannestad), their four children (aged two to eight), his own sisters Nicoline and Caroline Topp, his wife's relative Lars Nannestad (customs officer) and three maids. Christian Wilhelm Lund, the proprietor of the tavern in the basement, resided in the associated dwelling with his wife Ane Marie født Sørensen, their 17-year-old daughter, one maid and one lodger. Peter Christian Svane, a skipper, resided in the right-hand side of the basement with his wife Ane Dorthea (née Køhler) and their six children (aged one to 18).

=== Fiedler family ===
The property was home to 39 residents in six households in 1840. William Eiler Fiedler, a merchant, resided on the ground floor with his wife Dorothea Fiedler, their 14-year-old son William Timotheus Fiedler (1826-), the wife's sisters Sophie and Kirstine Petersen, a lodger and two maids. Johan Daniel Jacobsen, a skipper, resided on the first floor of the side wing with his wife Marthe Jacobsen. Johan Gudmann still resided with his family on the second floor. Joachim Topp was now also living with his family on the second floor. Christian Wilhelm Lund was still managing the tavern in the basement. Jürgen Schou, a workman, resided in the other half of the basement with his wife Karen Schou and their three children (aged nine to 13).

=== 1850 census ===
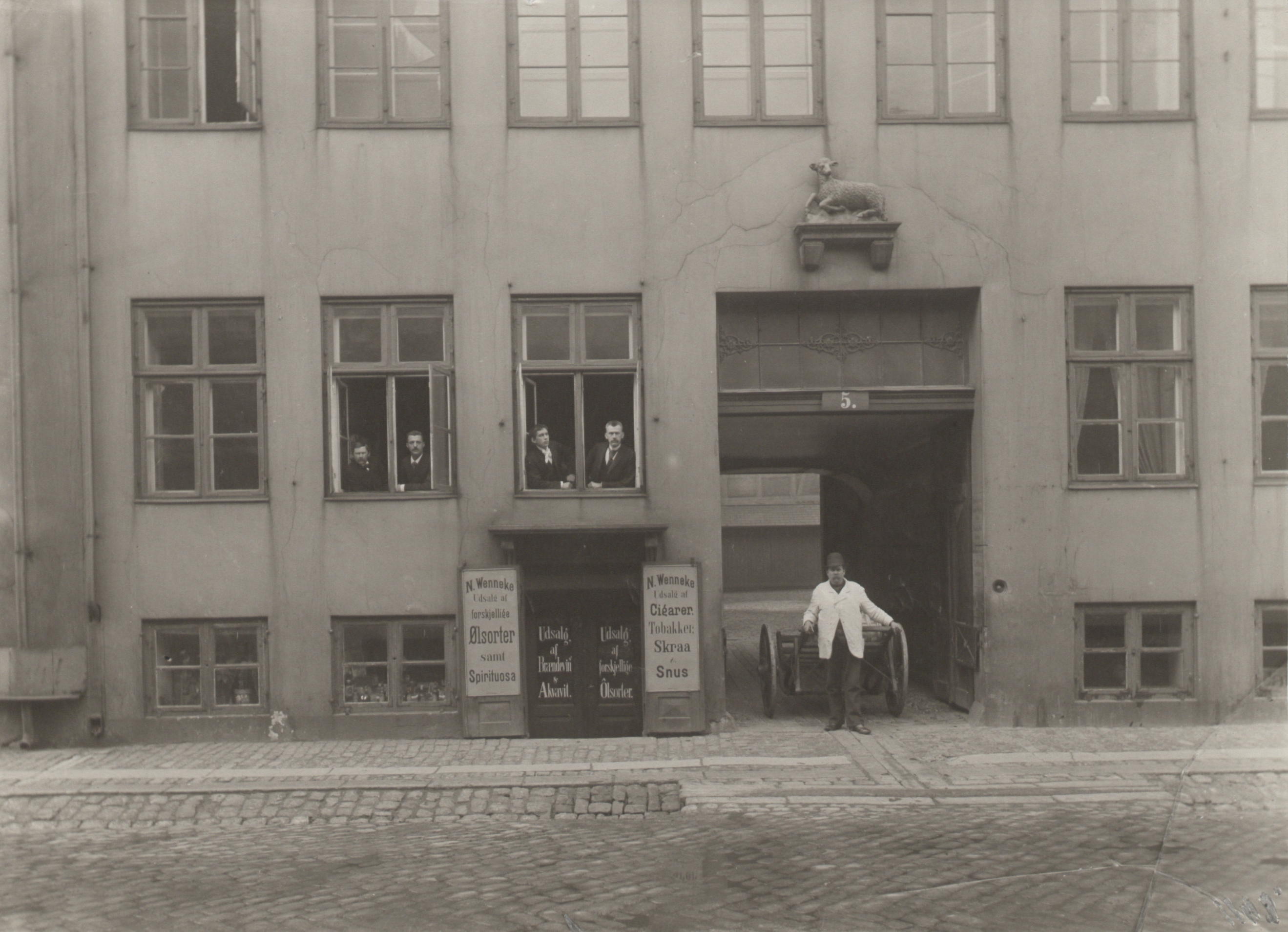
N. Wenneke's wine and tobacco store, c. 1895

The property was home to eight households in 1850. William E. Fiedler still resided in the ground floor apartment to the right with his sister-in-law and two maids. Elisabeth Topp, who had now become a widow, resided in the ground floor apartment to the left with five of her children. Annette Løwenskiold (1811-1890), wife of Carl Eggert Georg Løvenskiold (1806-1884) and the owner of Vrejlev Priory, resided on the first floor with her four children (aged nine to 14), two young unmarried women, one male servant and two maids. Johan Gudmann and his family still resided in the second floor apartment. Wilhelm Mathæus Moltke (1791-1864), a count, resided on the third floor with his wife Thusnelda Moltke (née von Reden, 1814-). Christine Louise Krøyer, widow of a justitsråd, was also residing on the third floor with her 14-year-old daughter Caroline Johanne Krøyer and one maid. Jens Jeppesen Olsen, the proprietor of the tavern in the basement, resided in the associated dwelling with his wife Emilie Holm and two maids.

The military officer Christian de Meza (1792–1865) was a resident of the building from 1851 to 1856. The composer Niels W. Gade lived in the building from 1855 to 1857. His next home was a residence in the new Royal Danish Music Academy's building at Vester Voldgade 11. The painter Anna Petersen (1845-1910) lived on the third floor in the early 1890s. The art historian Troels Troels-Lund (1840–1921) occupied the apartment on the first floor from 1886. He published Dagligliv i Norden from 1879 and was in 1896 appointed as royal ordenshistoriograf. He lived in the apartment until his death in 1921.

=== 20th century ===
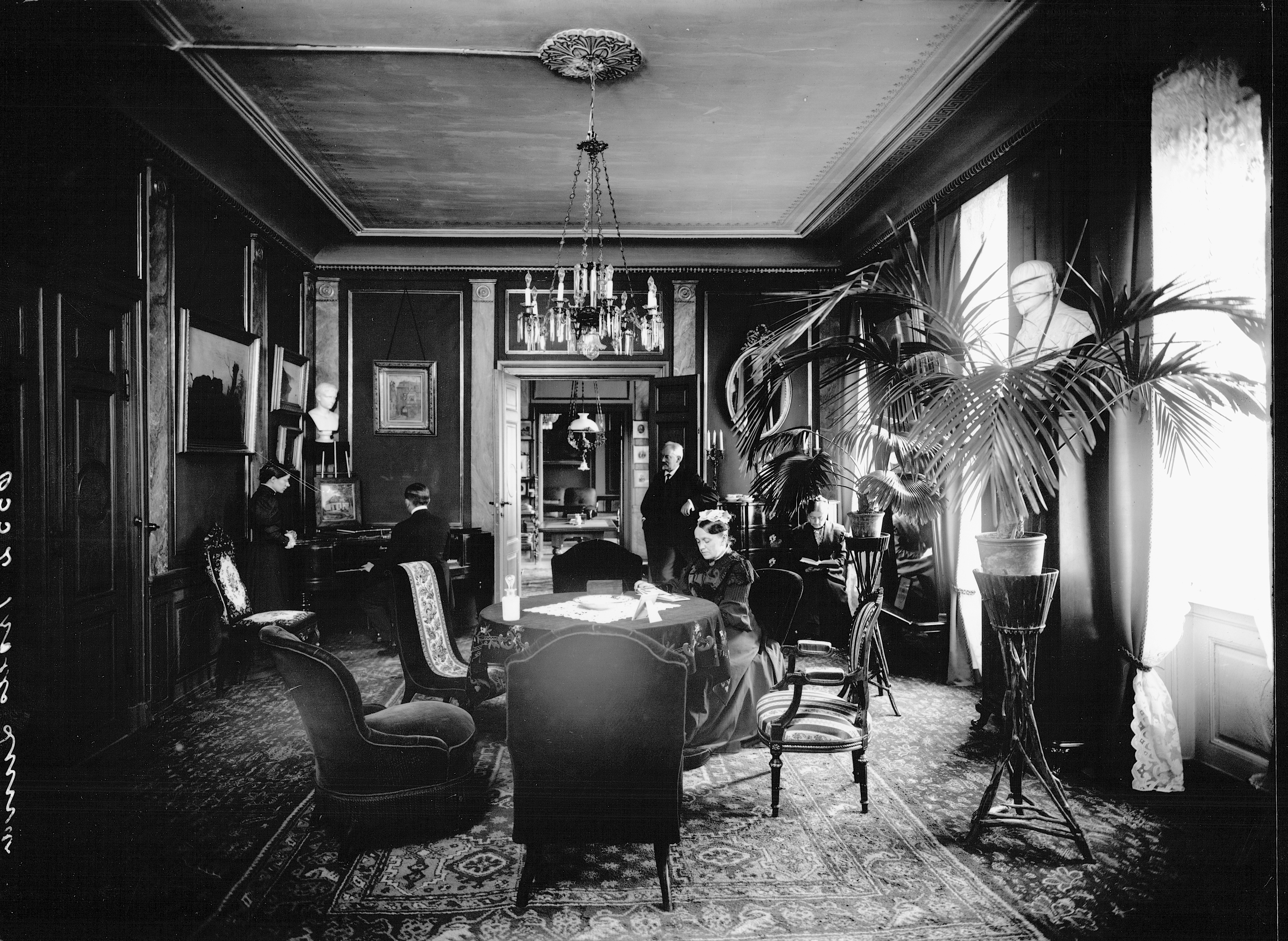
Troels Lund's living room, 1906

Troels Lund resided in one of the apartments in the 1900s.

== Architecture ==
The building consists of four floors over a raised cellar and is 11 bays wide. A gateway is located in the fourth bay and two entrances to the cellar are located at the third and ninth bays. An embedded sandstone plate with inscription between the second and third floor dates from the original building. Above the gateway is a sculpture of a reclining sheep supported by corbels. The cellar entrances are both topped by canopies in pinkish Nexø sandstone supported by corbels. A cornice decorated with dentils runs below the roof. Above the cornice is a decorative wrought-iron railing in the full length of the building.

== Today ==
The ground floor is used as office space while the upper floors each contain two apartments. The side wing is also used as office space. One of the companies based in the building is Danish Documentary Production.

== Gallery ==
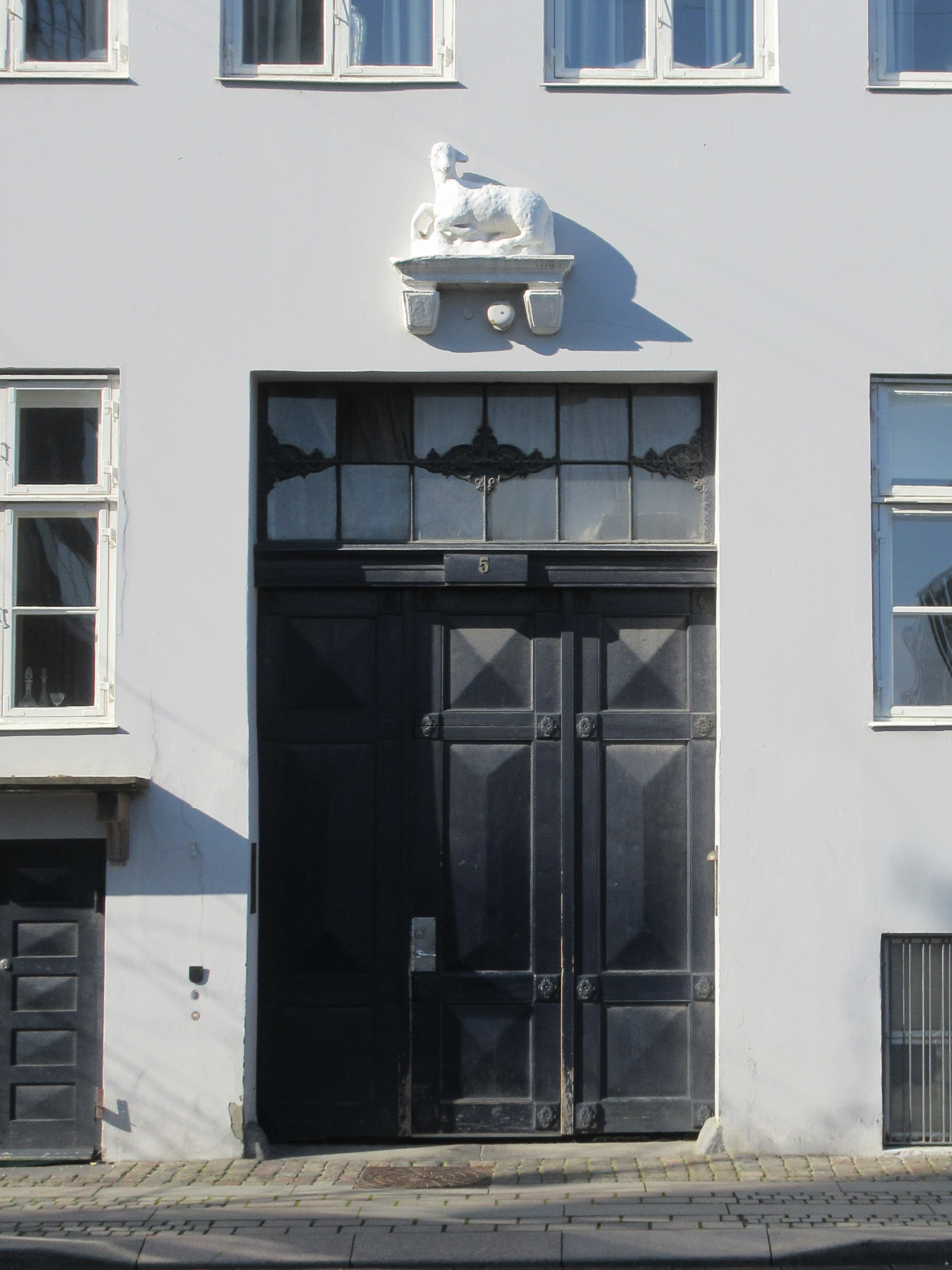
Main entrance

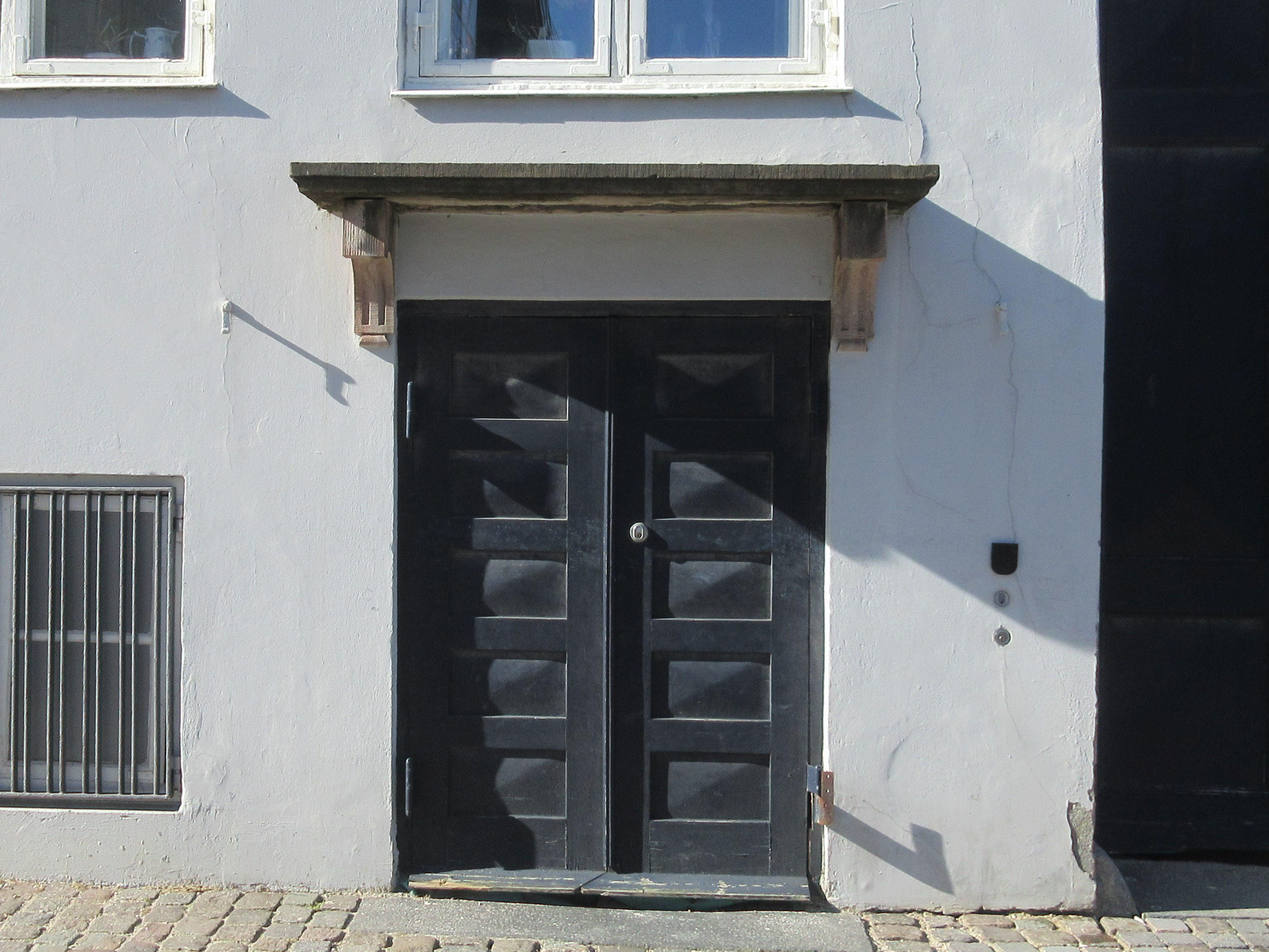

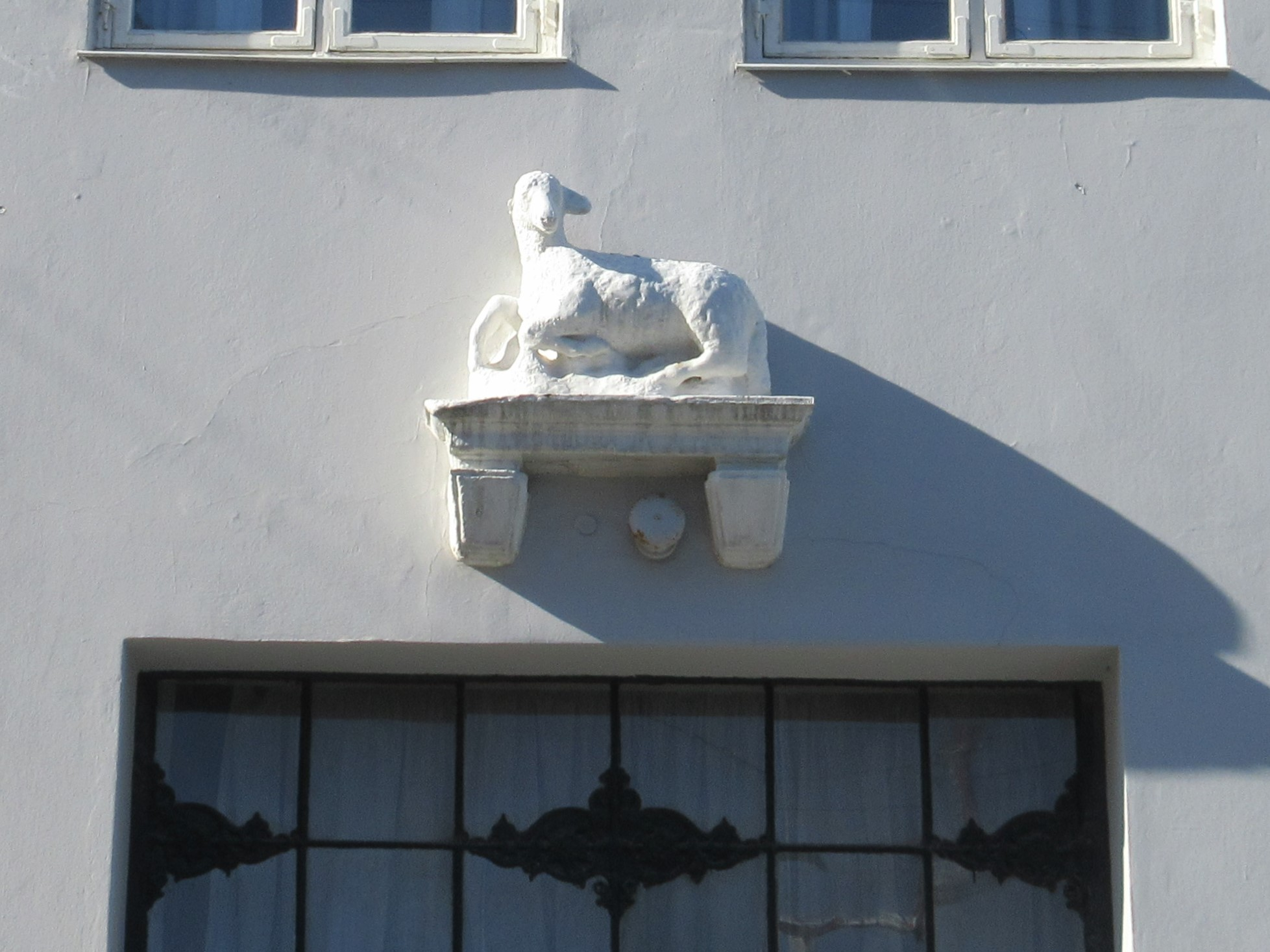
The lamb above the main entrance

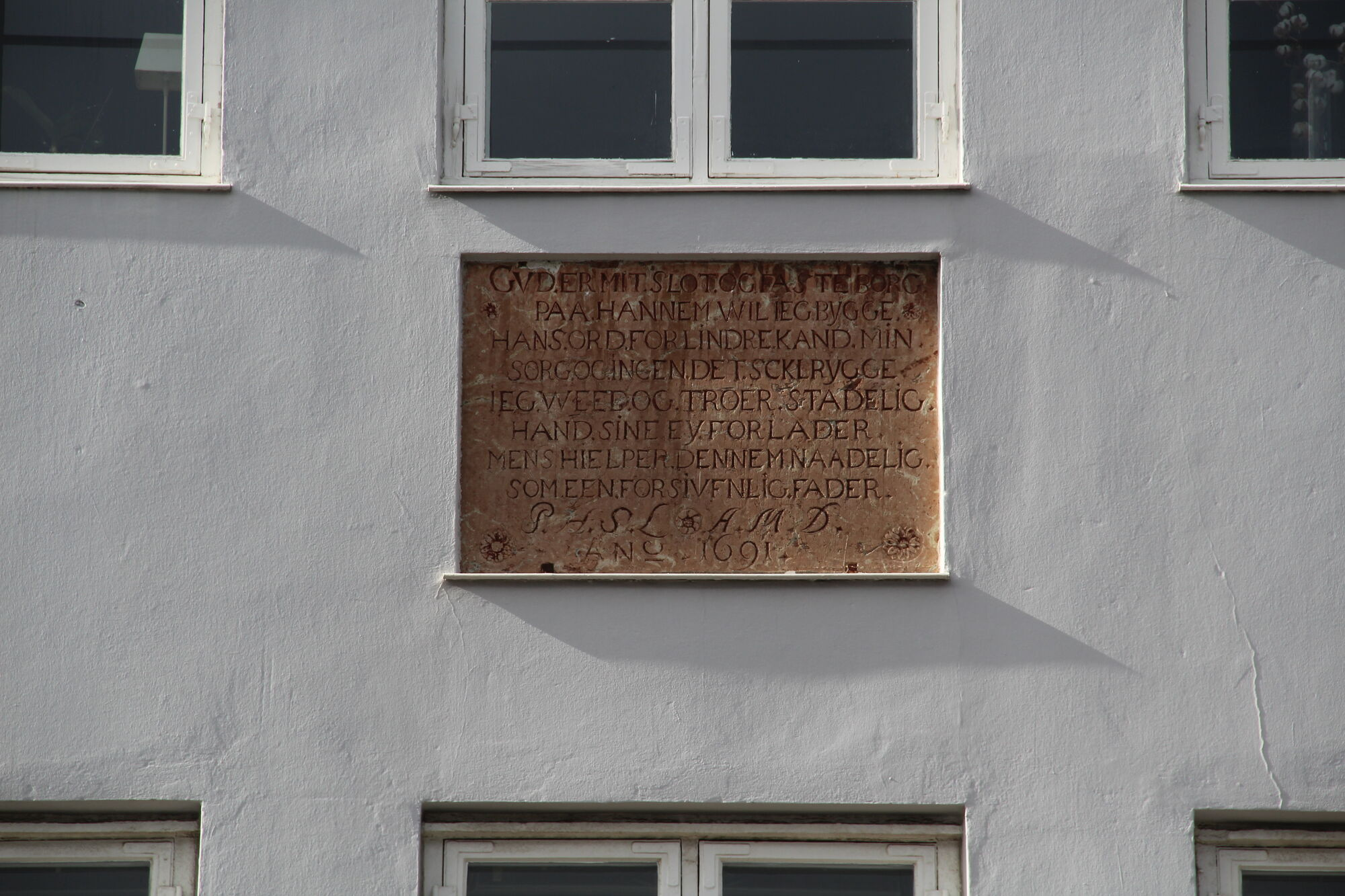
Commemorative plaque.
