= Peter Nadin =

American artist and farmer

Peter Nadin (born 1954) is a British-born American artist, poet, and farmer.

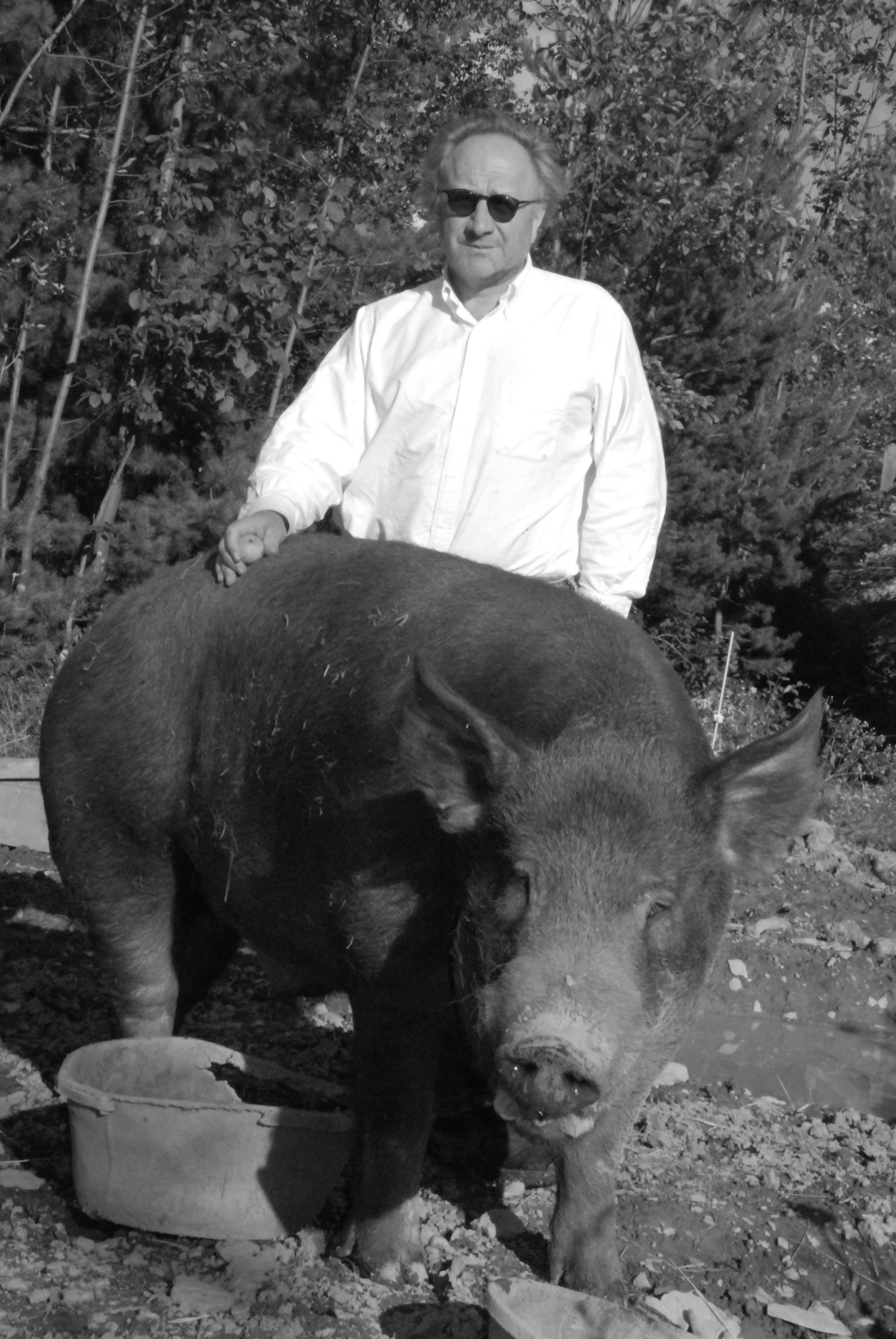
Peter Nadin with his boar, Abe, in 2011.

== Early career ==
Nadin was born in Bromborough, in northwest England He studied fine art at Newcastle University from 1972 to 1976, before moving to New York.

From 1977 to 1978 Nadin worked as a construction worker, along with the artist Christopher D’Arcangelo, with whom he began collaborating at the time. Together, they established a non-commercial gallery in Nadin’s Tribeca loft at 84 West Broadway, New York.

In this space, artists and musicians were invited to respond to the conditions they found in the gallery. Friends and guests were invited to stay and live there among work by artists such as Daniel Buren, Sean Scully and Dan Graham, with each new work responding to works installed earlier in the space; none of the work was for sale and everything remained in the gallery.

Nadin then began a consulting office offering practical aesthetic services in a short-lived artist consulting office collective with Jenny Holzer, Richard Prince, Peter Fend, Coleen Fitzgibbon, and Robin Winters. During this time he also worked collaboratively with Jenny Holzer publishing three books.

Nadin’s principal medium throughout the 1980s was painting, although he also produced sculpture and published poetry, including “Poetry Room,” a one-year installation at American Fine Art Gallery.

Although his work from this time passed through a variety of styles, its primary focus is the representation of consciousness through painterly marks—a theme that Nadin returned to throughout his career.

He had solo exhibitions at the Institute of Contemporary Art, Boston and the Yale Center for British Art in New Haven, and showed at Brooke Alexander Gallery in New York. He also participated in many group shows, including the 1988 Venice Biennale.

== Farming ==
In 1992, Nadin ceased to exhibit his art and turned to farming. He acquired Old Field Farm, a farm dating to the early 19th century in Cornwallville, a hamlet in the northern Catskills of New York.

Through the 1990s and 2000s Nadin expanded the farm, on which he raises pigs, chickens, ducks, cashmere goats, and bees. Nadin eventually founded Old Field Farm/Art & Agriculture, which provides meat, produce, honey and other farm products to local restaurants and markets.

Although he stopped exhibiting during this period, Nadin continued to make art, often influenced directly by his work as a farmer. His paintings included materials directly from the farm, such as cashmere from his goats or wax from his bees.

== First Mark ==
In 2006 Nadin published The First Mark: Unlearning How to Make Art, a book that combines cultural criticism with discursive takes on the process of art making and human behavior. That year Nadin traveled to Cuba, not as an artist, but as a delegate to the South American Beekeepers’ Conference. While in Havana he was invited to exhibit his art at the Wifredo Lam Center, and in 2007 he presented a show entitled First Mark. First Mark traveled to other Cuban cities—Pinar Del Río, Matanzas, Holguín, and San Antonio de los Baños—and later to Cuenca, Ecuador.

After an absence of almost 20 years, Nadin held his first exhibition in New York in 2011 at Gavin Brown’s enterprise in the West Village.
