= Fredric Snitzer =

American artist and art dealer

Fredric Snitzer is an art dealer and artist based in Miami, Florida. In 1977, he founded the eponymous Fredric Snitzer Gallery. His gallery exhibitions and artist group shows are considered instrumental in Miami as a respectable player on the global art scene.
