= Janelle Reiring =

Art gallerist, curator (born 1946)

Janelle Reiring (born 1946) is an American art dealer and gallerist. She is known as co-founder and co-director of Metro Pictures Gallery in New York City, alongside Helene Winer. Metro Pictures was a leading contemporary art gallery that played a central role in promoting artists of the Pictures Generation, and was part of the "boom" in the art market of the 1980s. Before starting Metro Pictures, Reiring had worked at Leo Castelli Gallery.

== Life ==
Janelle Reiring was born in 1946. Before founding Metro Pictures Gallery, Reiring worked at the Leo Castelli Gallery in New York, where she gained experience in contemporary art dealings. In 1978, She curated a show at Artists Space where future Metro Pictures co-founder Helene Winer was director; it featured work by Louise Lawler, Christopher D'Arcangelo, Adrian Piper, and Cindy Sherman.

In 1980, Reiring co-founded Metro Pictures Gallery in New York City with Helene Winer. The inaugural exhibition featured works by artists who would later be identified as central to the Pictures Generation as theorized by Douglas Crimp, including Cindy Sherman, Robert Longo, Troy Brauntuch, Jack Goldstein, Sherrie Levine, James Welling, and Richard Prince.
