= Cadogan Gardens =

Street in Chelsea, London

Coordinates: 51.49295°N 0.15943°W

Cadogan Gardens in Chelsea

Cadogan Gardens is a street in the Chelsea area of London, England. It is part of the Cadogan Estate.

== Layout ==
It forms a rough square, with arms leading off the east side to Sloane Street and Pavilion Road. It also connects with Cadogan Square, Cadogan Street, and Draycott Place. The layout of the street is complicated and the house-numbering system has been described as "mysterious".

== Buildings ==
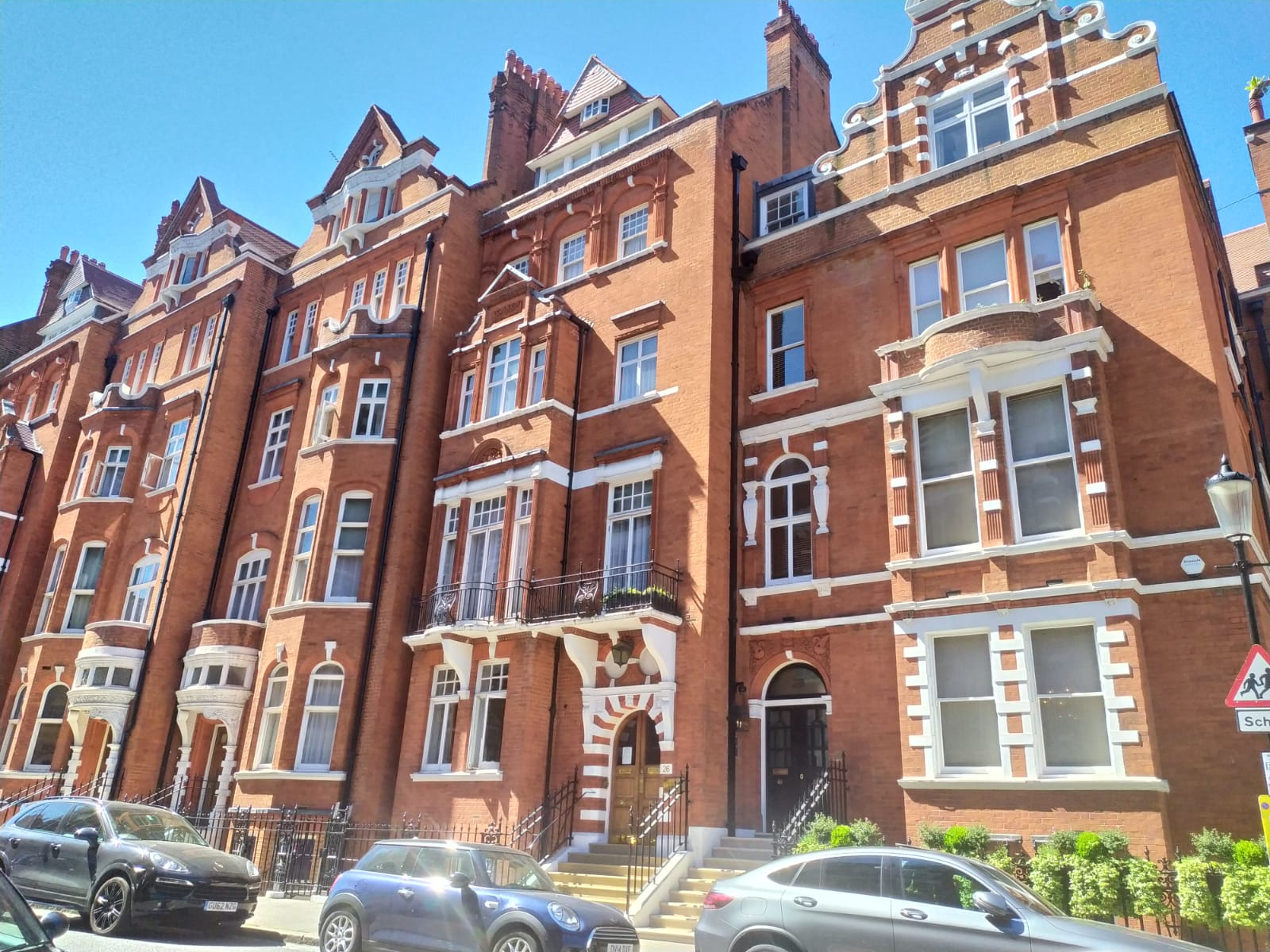
22–26 Cadogan Gardens in 2021

At number 26 is a 5-star hotel named The Chelsea Townhouse. It was previously called the Draycott Hotel.

At number 11 is another 5-star hotel, which is known as 11 Cadogan Gardens. It is a 56-bedroom hotel and consists of four large houses. It had been a private members' club until Lord Cadogan (as freeholder) acquired the leasehold in 2012 and had it converted into a hotel.

== Residents ==
The artist Mortimer Menpes lived at number 25 from 1892 in a Japanese-styled house designed by Arthur Mackmurdo.

In the 1960s, numbers 53 and 55 were the residences of diplomats from Czechoslovakia.

The actor and writer Dirk Bogarde lived at number 2 for the last decade of his life.
