= Danish Documentary Production =

- Company type: Private limited company
- Industry: Documentary Film
- Founded: 2007
- Headquarters: Copenhagen, Denmark
- Key people: Eva Mulvad, Pernille Rose Grønkjær and Mikala Krogh
- Products: Film

Danish Documentary Production, formerly Danish Documentary, is a documentary film production company based in Copenhagen, Denmark. The firm is based at Kvæsthusgade 5.

== History ==
Danish Documentary Production was founded in 2007 and is led by directors and executive producers Eva Mulvad, Pernille Rose Grønkjær and Mikala Krogh.

== Filmography ==
Danish Documentary/Danish Documentary Production has produced the following films:

- Cairo skrald (2009)
- Fever (2010)
- Hjemmefronten - fjenden bag hækken (2010)
- Love addict - historier om drømme, besættelse og længsel (2011)
- Ballroom Dancer (2011)
- Det gode liv (2011)
- Kongens foged (2012)
- Kongens foged - sat på gaden (2012)
- Kongens foged - sat på gaden (2012)
- En mors kamp for et normalt liv (2012)
- Free the mind (2012)
- Ai Weiwei The Fake Case (2013)
- Something Better to Come (2014)
- Ekstra Bladet: uden for citat (2014)
- Slottet (2014)
- Så meget godt i vente (2014)
- Mand falder (2015)
- Aquarela (2016)
- BUGS (2016)
- Amateurs in Space (2016)
- A Year of Hope (2017)
- Den anden side (2017)
- A Modern Man (2017)
- Auf Safari (2017)
- I Walk (2019)
- Love Child (2019)
- School of Seduction (2019)
- Hunting for Hedonia (2019)
- Kirsebæreventyret (2019)
- The Cave (2019)
- Apolonia, Apolonia (2020)
- The Missing Films (2020)
- The Heart is a Lonely Hunter (2020)
- Solutions (2020)
- Apolonia, Apolonia (2023)
