= Pavilion Road =

Street in Chelsea, London

Coordinates: 51°29′49″N 0°9′35″W

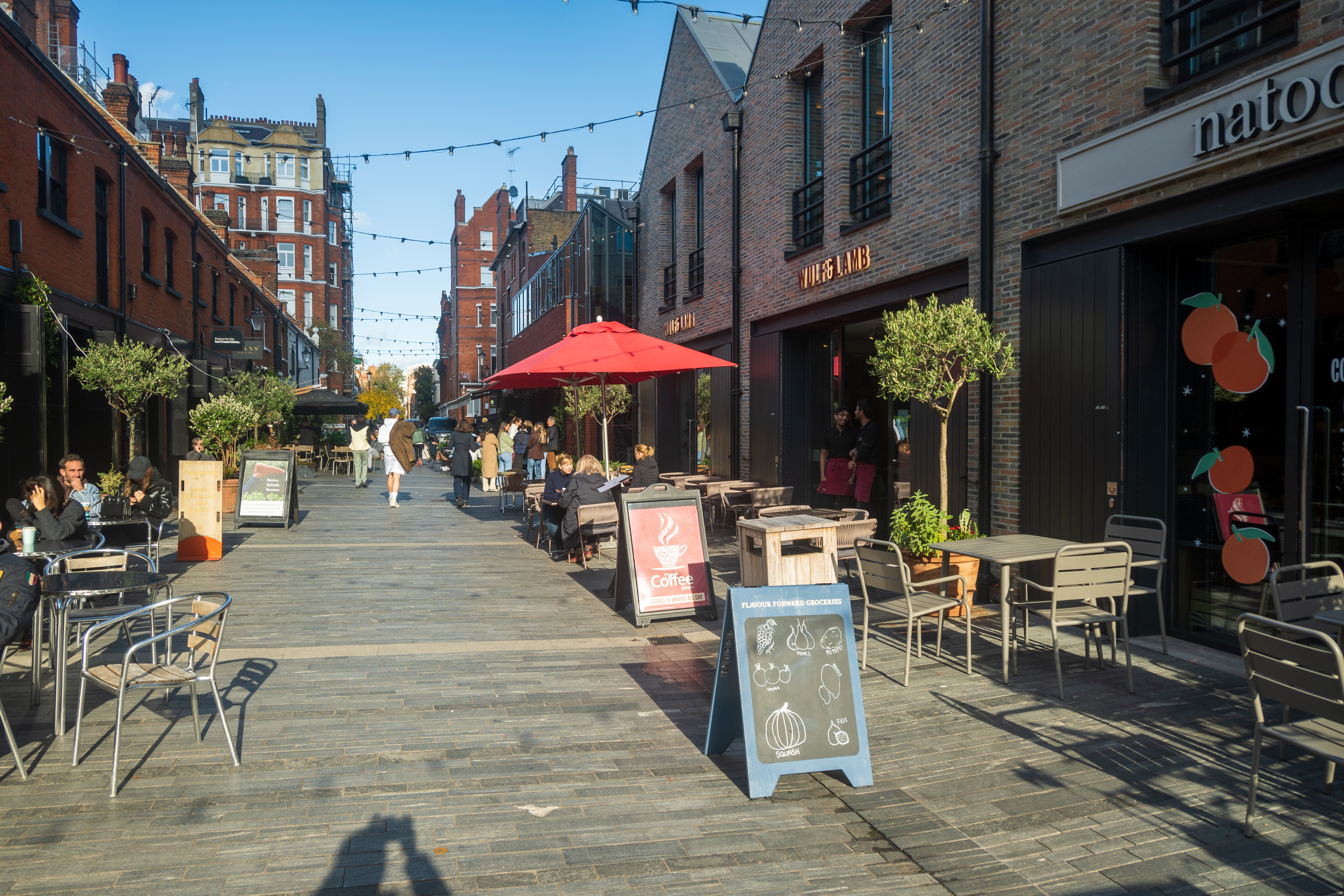
View of Pavilion Road near Cadogan Gardens

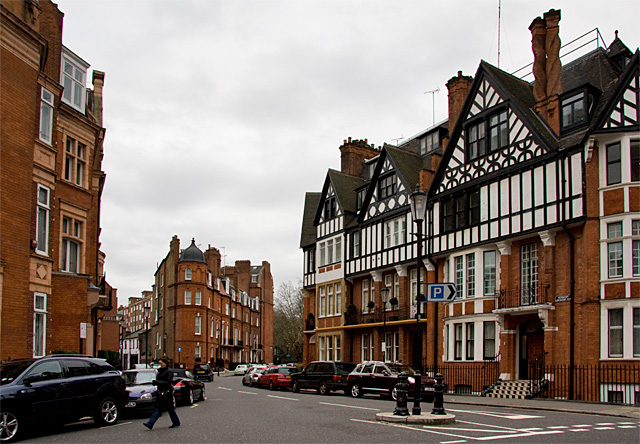
Pavilion Road at the Herbert Crescent intersection

Pavilion Road is a street in Chelsea in the Royal Borough of Kensington and Chelsea, London. It runs parallel to Sloane Street and is accessed from Sloane Square in the southern end and Basil Street in the northern end.

Following a consultation with the local community in the middle of 2015, Cadogan Estates pledged to create a destination for independent, artisan traders behind the new George House development on Sloane Street. Established fashion and beauty boutiques were joined by new artisan food shops in November 2016.
