= Leyla Gediz =

Turkish artist (born 1974)

Leyla Gediz (born 1974) is a Turkish artist. Gediz grew up in İstanbul. She studied at the Chelsea College of Art and Design, the Slade School of Fine Arts, and Goldsmiths College, University of London, receiving an MA in Visual Arts.

In 1995 and 1997 Gediz won 1st prize in the Slade School's Still Life Competition. In 2003 her work was included in the Where?, Here?, Turkish Art Today at The Museum of Modern Art, Saitama, Japan. In 2010 her work was included in the A Dream…but not yours: Contemporary Art from Turkey at the National Museum of Women in the Arts, Washington, DC.

Leyla Gediz developed a conceptual approach to painting over the years. Often creating installations for her solo shows, she extends her interrogation of figure and frame into the exhibition space.

In 2017 Gediz moved to Lisbon, Portugal where she took part in the research project the Women: Navigating Presence and Absence at the Gulbenkian Foundation in 2021.

Gediz is represented by The Pill Gallery, Istanbul.
