= Eva Nielsen (artist) =

French-Danish visual artist

Eva Nielsen (born 1983) is a French-Danish visual artist who currently lives and works in Paris. She is known for mixing screen-printing techniques with oil and ink on canvas to create large paintings of contemporary suburban landscapes.

== Biography ==
After a BA in Modern History and Literature, Eva Nielsen received her MFA from Beaux-Arts de Paris in 2009 with a one-year Socrates scholarship at Central Saint Martins, London (2008). Upon graduation she was the recipient of the Prix des Amis des Beaux-Arts / Thaddeus Ropac Prize (2009) offering support and exhibition opportunities to young artists, followed by the Art Collector Prize in 2014. Her work has been shown in institutions such as Mac/Val, BNKR München, Los Angeles Contemporary Exhibitions (LACE), Louis Vuitton Foundation, Kunsthal Charlottenburg. Her work was included in the 16th Lyon Biennale of Contemporary Art: Manifesto of Fragility.

In subsequent years, Eva Nielsen's work has been short-listed for AWARE and Meurice prizes in 2017 and nominated for the 23rd Foundation Pernod Ricard Prize in 2022. She was the recipient of LVMH Métiers d'Art Grant and Residency program in 2021, allowing her to work closely with artisanal silk and leather printing techniques. In 2023, she was the recipient of BMW Group's Art Makers Program with French curator Marianne Derrien to create a series of works with a focus on the Camargue territory, with solo exhibitions at Rencontres photographiques d'Arles and Paris Photo (2023).

Eva Nielsen teaches at Beaux-Arts de Paris since 2022 and has been represented by The Pill Gallery since 2015.

== Work ==
Eva Nielsen uses silk-screen printing in her paintings in order to fragment and rearrange imagery from built environment, abandoned suburbia and desolate infrastructures. The hybridity of her gesture has been described as both "human and mechanical, producing a sensitive complexity". French art critic Anaël Pigeat wrote in 2012 that this contributes to a fragmentation on the painting's surface that acts "literally and metaphorically as projection surfaces, windows on the world both concealing and revealing". In 2014 she was cited by Arts Magazine among the forerunners of the "new wave" in French painting centered around a shared "spectral quality". According to art ciritic Clément Dirié, by using screen-printing, emphasizing negative space and blur, "Eva Nielsen offers traps for the eye, receptacles to project yourself into cognitive instruments against which we measure ourselves". In her "Insolare" series, combining "optical and hydrogeological phenomena with exposure to light, a technique used in screen-printing", Nielsen references "the incredible complexity of loss in nature".

== Exhibitions ==
Eva Nielsen's solo exhibitions include:

- INSOLARE, BMW Art Makers Prize, Rencontres photographiques d'Arles & Paris Photo, Paris (2023)
- INTARSIA III, The Pill Gallery, Istanbul (2023)
- INTARSIA II, Jousse Entreprise, Paris (2022)
- INTARSIA I, LVMH Residency Exhibition, Forma, Paris (2022)
- Hypersurface, Le Point Commun, Annecy (2020)
- Evergreen Plaza, Maison Salvan, Labege (2019)
- Cosmovisions, The Pill Gallery, Istanbul (2018)
- Hard Sun, The Cabin, Los Angeles (2017)

Her work has been included in institutional group shows such as

- Voir en peinture, MASC, Sables d'olonne (2023)
- Immortelle, MO.CO, Montpellier (2023)
- Manifesto of Fragility, 16th Lyon Biennial, Lyon, (2022)
- Horizones, 23rd Pernod Ricard Foundation Prize, Paris (2022)
- 20 ans – 20 œuvres, les Abattoirs, Toulouse (2020)
- 10 ans de créations contemporaines, Musée Départementale de la Tapisserie, Aubusson (2020)
- Fragments Éphémères, Fondation Schneider, Wattwiller (2020)
- Persona Grata?, MAC/VAL, Val de Marne (2019)
- 16th International Triennial of Tapestry in Lodz, Central Museum of Textiles Lodz (2019)
- Some of us, Kunstwerk Carlhütte, Hamburg (2019)
- Recto-Verso #2, Fondation Louis Vuitton, Paris (2018)
- Plymouth Contemporary Biennial, Peninsula University & Karst (2017)
- Les épis Girardon, Moly Sabata, Albert Gleizes Foundation, Sablons (2017)
- Painting, She said, Museum of Rochechouart (2015)
