= Ozlem Altin =

German-Turkish visual artist

Özlem Altin (born 1977) is a German and Turkish visual artist living and working in Berlin, Germany

== Biography ==
Born in 1977 in Goch, Germany, Özlem Altin studied at the Hoogeschool voor de Kunsten, Arnhem and holds an MA degree from Piet Zwart Institute, both in the Netherlands. Upon completing her studies, she was the recipient of the Fonds BKVB, The Netherlands Foundation for Visual Arts, Design and Architecture for work and publishing, which helped Altin found the independent publishing platform Orient Press to publish and distribute artist books.

In 2020 her work was included in the New Photography 2020 online exhibition at MoMA.

Özlem Altin has served as a guest professor for photography at HBG Leipzig in 2020-2021 and a guest professor at UMPRUM Prague in 2023.

== Work ==
Özlem Altin constitutes an archive of her own photographs and found images, including other artists’ works and material from museum collections, the Internet and mass media, she then selectively activates imagery from this archive through collages, photographs and painting, creating multilayered constellations. Her research focuses on the body, inanimate body parts and the artefact in motion. According to curator Lucy Gallun, symbols, such as the mask, the heron, the mermaid, "embody something part human, part animal", "a state of in-between-ness, and they appear again and again in her work". In a 2010 interview with Mousse Magazine, the artist states that she is "interested in staging the human body in a zero condition, in a state of exhaustion and passivity". In a critical text, Vanessa Müller elaborates on this idea in contrast to "the spectactular": "a repertoire of frozen poses, mute gestures and inert people evolves, presenting themselves to the discriminating gaze as objects while noneteless slipping away again and again".

Özlem Altin was the recipient of the Villa Romana Prize, Florence, in 2020 and the Hannah-Hoch-Förderpreis from the State of Berlin in 2024.

== Exhibitions ==
Özlem Altin's work has been the subject of monographic exhibitions such as "Geometric Portrait", Museum voor Moderne Kunst, Arnhem (2008); "No story, no", Witte de With, Rotterdam, curated by Defne Ayas and Samuel Saelemakers (2015); "Untitled (touch or melancholy)", Lentos Kunstmuseum, Linz (2016) and "Processing" at Camera Austria, Graz (2017). Her work has been included in group exhibitions such as "The End of 20th Century: The Best is Yet To Come" curated by Eugen Blume and Catherine Nichols at the Hamburger Bahnhof, Berlin, 2013; "We Don't Need Another Hero", 10th Berlin Biennial curated by Gabi Ngcobo, 2018; "The Seventh Continent", 16th Istanbul Biennial curated by Nicolas Bourriaud, 2019; "Part of the Labyrinth", GIBCA Gothenburg Biennial, Sweden, curated by Lisa Rosendahl, 2019; "The Milk of Dreams", 59th International Art Exhibition of La Biennale di Venezia, curated by Cecilia Alemani and "Touch. Politics of Touch", EMOP Berlin curated by Maren Lübke-Tidow and Rebecca Wilton.
