= Apolonia Sokol =

French painter (born 1988)

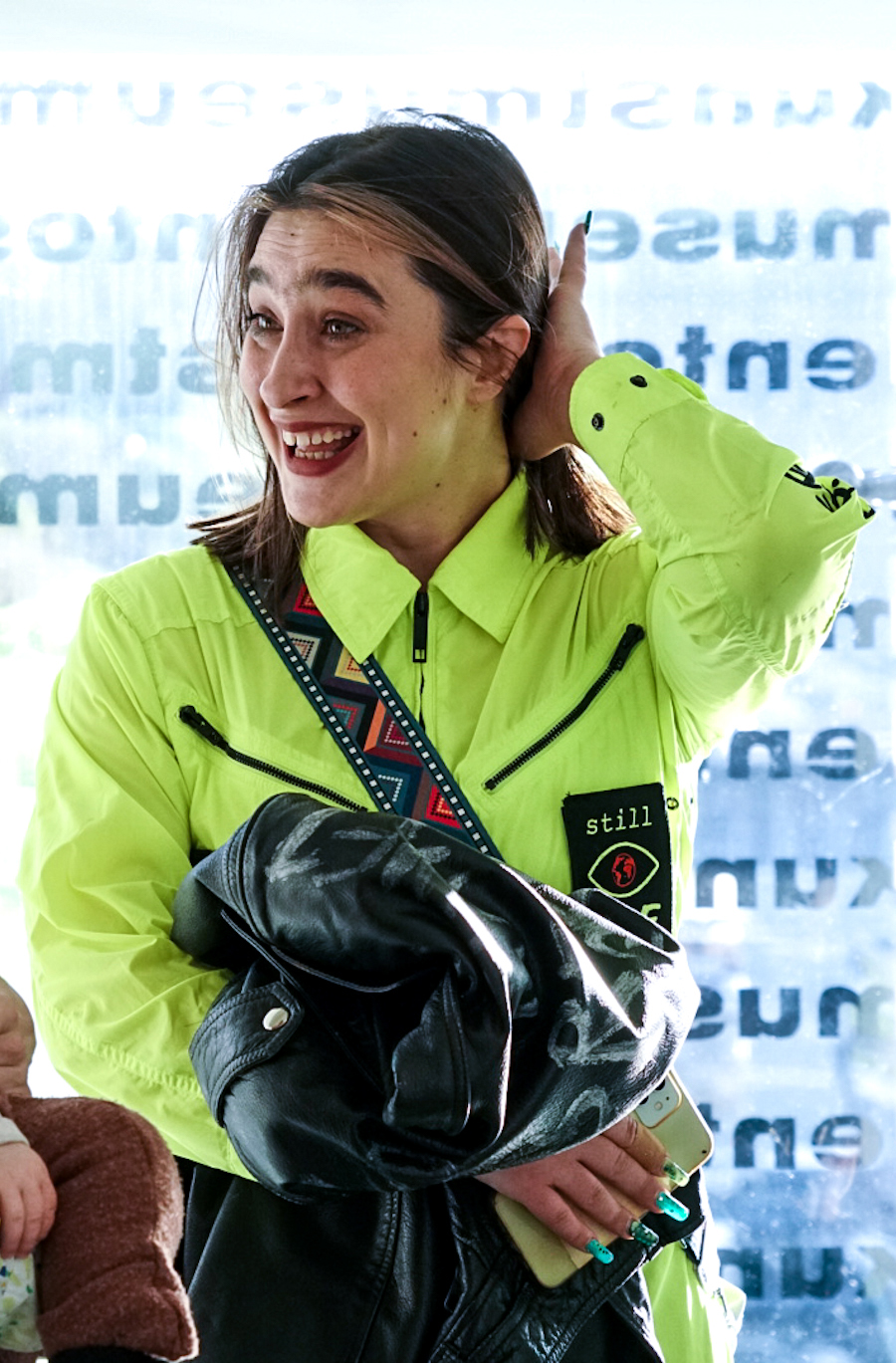
At Crossing Europe Film Festival

Apolonia Sokol (born 1988, Paris, France) is a French figurative painter. Her work has been widely exhibited in France, Denmark, Belgium and the USA. She is known for her autobiographical approach to painting, using the art of portraiture as a tool for political empowerment in paintings inspired by art historical canon, to address issues around feminism and queer culture.

A 2023 documentary film Apolonia, Apolonia by Lea Glob was made on her journey through 13 years of life.

== Biography ==
Sokol was born in Paris and is of Polish and French descent. She grew up in France and Denmark.

Sokol graduated from the Beaux-Arts de Paris with an MFA in 2015, after which she moved to New York where she worked in Dan Colen's studio. She then moved to Los Angeles where she found a community of artists to exchange around figurative painting.

Upon her return to Europe, she was nominated for the Révélations Emerige prize in 2018 and won the Antoine Marin prize in 2019. In 2020 she was the laureate of the prestigious Academy of France in Rome and won a residency at the Villa Medicis for 2020–2021.

In 2022, Danish Contemporary and HBO Max co-produced the documentary Apolonia, Apolonia directed by Léa Glob who followed Sokol's life and career for over a decade. The documentary film won Best Feature Length documentary at IDFA, Best Documentary at Hong Kong International Film Festival and Dragon Award Best Nordic Documentary at Gothenburg Film Festival. Touring festivals across the world throughout 2023, the film also won The International Documentary Grand Prix at Sofia International Film Festival, Best Film and Best Documentary on Music and Arts at Poland's Millenium Docs Against Gravity Festival and was selected as Unforgettable honoree by 17th Cinema Eye Honors Awards, USA.

== Work ==
Apolonia Sokol counts as one of the leading figures in New French Painting according to multiple reviews. Reflecting on gendered representation throughout history and on body politics, Apolonia Sokol's paintings are characterized by her close relationships and intimacy with the models she paints. She often depicts her friends, lovers and collaborators as icons of a radical subjectivity bound together by alternative kinships and an idea of "chosen family". French art critic Richard Leydier notes the theatricality of space in Sokol's paintings where the women depicted "inhabit an unusual space that contains them within an enclosed and angular geometry (...) The icon establishes the relationship between background and subject, such that it is a metaphor for the way a figure is transplanted into a place, a backdrop or a country".

While the artist references the influence of artists such as Suzanne Valadon, Alice Neel, Chantal Joffe and Tracey Emin as important influences, she also addresses through her work the omission of women from art history, by rehabilitating historical figures such as Artemisia Gentileschi or Elisabetta Sirani in contemporary interpretations of their works, and by appropriating and reversing iconographic elements from well-known paintings such as Boticelli's Primavera.

== Exhibitions ==
Apolonia Sokol's work was presented in a major solo exhibition at Arken Museum of Modern Art in Copenhagen, Denmark in 2023. She has participated in important survey exhibitions such as Women Painting Women at the Modern Art Museum of Fort Worth, Texas, US (2022); Women and Change at the Arken Museum of Modern Art, Copenhagen, Denmark (2022); L'Immortelle. Vitalité de la Jeune Peinture Figurative Française (2023) and Possessed (2020) at MO.CO Montpellier, France; She - Classicità at the Polana Institute, Warsaw, Poland (2021) and Entre tes yeux et les images que j'y vois (A Sentimental Choice) at the Pernod Ricard Foundation in Paris, France (2022).
