= Ben Kinmont =

American artist

- Born: 1963 (age 62–63); Burlington, Vermont, United States
- Education: Pomona College
- Known for: Artist and antiquarian bookseller
- Notable work: An exhibition in your mouth (2002–2011); On becoming something else (2009–2013)

Ben Kinmont (born 1963) is an artist, publisher, and antiquarian bookseller living in Sebastopol, California, United States. His work is concerned with the value structures surrounding an art practice and what happens when that practice is displaced into a non-art space. Since 1988 his work has been project-based with an interest in archiving and blurring the boundaries between artistic production, publishing, and curatorial practices.

In past years he taught courses in the Social Practices Program at the California College of Arts, as well as organized various workshops with students from the École des Beaux-Arts in France (Angers, Bordeaux, Bourges, and Valence), Cranbrook Academy in the US, and the Rietveld Academy in the Netherlands. Exhibitions include those at Air de Paris, Whitney Biennial 2014, ICA (London), CNEAI (Chatou), the 25th International Biennial of Graphic Arts (Ljubljana), the Frac Languedoc-Roussillon (Montpellier), Documenta 11 (Kassel), Les Abattoirs (Toulouse), the Pompidou, the San Francisco Museum of Modern Art, and a traveling survey show of Kinmont’s work entitled “Prospectus” (Amsterdam, Paris, New York, and San Francisco). He is also the founder of the Antinomian Press, a publishing enterprise which supports project art and ephemera.

In April 2015, Kinmont was profiled by Stett Holbrook in The North Bay Bohemian.
