= Andrei Kashperski =

Belarusian film director, screenwriter, editor, producer

- Андрэй Кашперскі
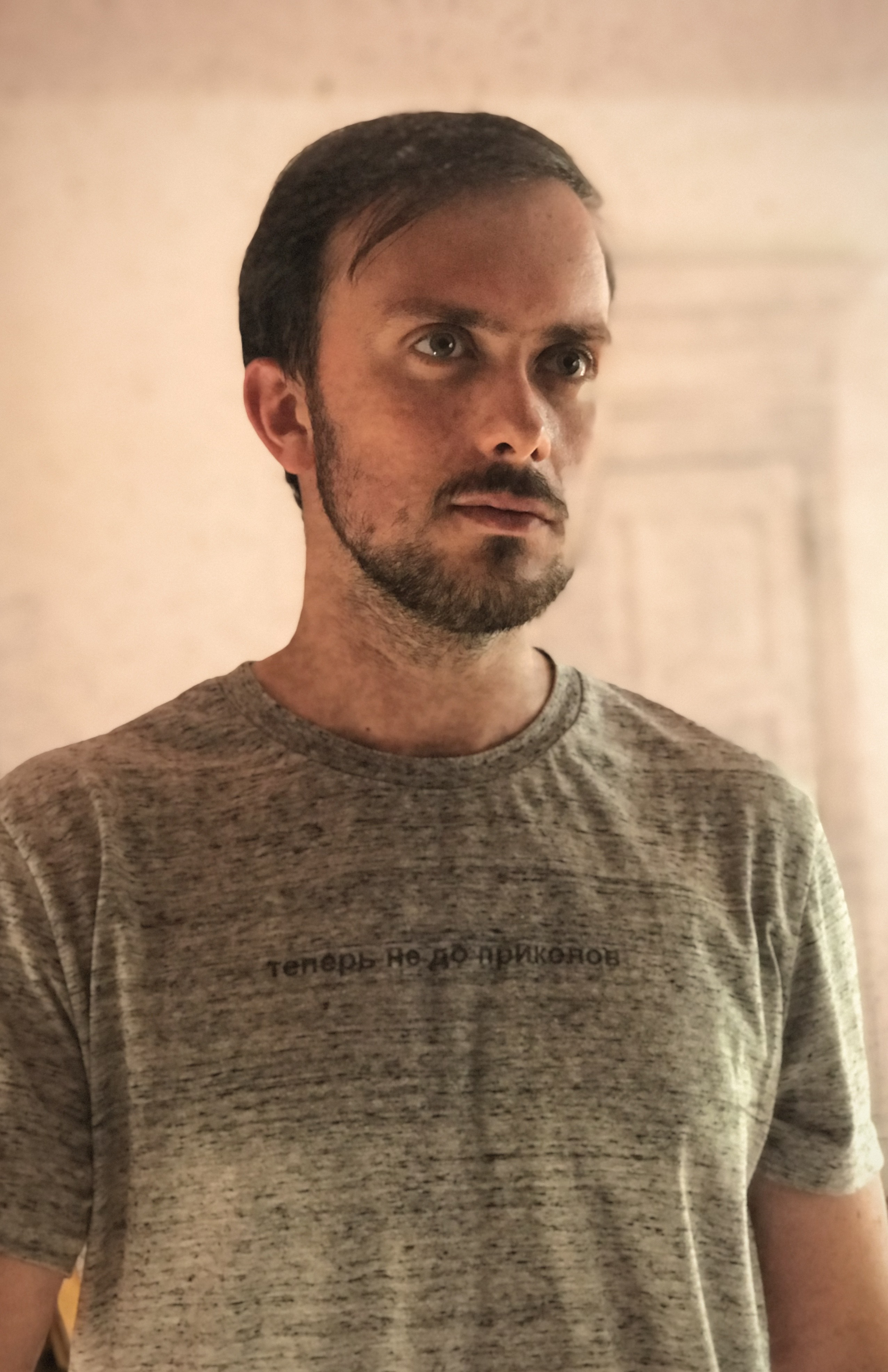
- Born: June 27, 1995 (age 30); Brest, Belarus
- Occupation(s): film director, screenwriter, editor, producer
- Years active: 2012–
- Notable work: "Processes"

Andrei Kashperski (Belarusian: Андрэй Кашперскі, Russian: Андрей Кашперский; born June 27, 1995) is a Belarusian film director, screenwriter, editor and producer.

== Early life ==
He was born on June 27, 1995 in Brest, Belarus. He started making his first amateur films with his friends from the playground at the age of 12. Two years later he founded a 17-person creative group A&B Films, which made short films in Brest. At the age of 16 he took part in the film festivals "Smartfilm" and "Tvori Gora". In 2017 he graduated from the Belarusian State Academy of Arts with a specialty "directing". During his studies he received a presidential scholarship for talented youth. By the time he graduated he had made 11 short films, including several that were distinguished and awarded at international festivals. After graduation he worked for a short time at the Belarusian state film studio Belarusfilm.

== Career ==
In 2018, he joined the team of a popular Belarusian YouTube channel "Gusin". He prepared for it a season of a series about a goose named Harvey living in a city apartment. In 2020, together with actors of the Janka Kupala National Theatre Mikhail Zuy and Dzmitry Yesianevich, he founded a YouTube channel "ChinChinChannel", where he serves as film director and showrunner. The channel ridicules Belarusian government propaganda of the Lukashenka era and stereotypical state officials, the so-called chinovniks. Kashperski produces satirical materials, clips and short films for the channel, such as "Shchuchinshchyna", which had over 1.1 million views in 2025. At the end of 2020, he produced a full-length comedy New Year's musical "ChynChyny u krainie cudau" (English: ChinChins in Wonderland), which was broadcast on Belsat TV.

In 2021, together with the "ChinChinChannel" team, he went to Ukraine, where he made the satirical series "Tut byu Lenin" (English: Here was Lenin). After shooting about 1/3 of the material, the work was interrupted by the Russian invasion of Ukraine in 2022. In March 2022, he left for Poland, where he lives and works as a film director. He is a member of the Belarusian Independent Film Academy. In 2023 he made the four-episode series "Processes", which was broadcast on the YouTube channel "Vot tak" which is part of Belsat TV. The series received numerous awards at festivals in Europe and the United States. In 2025, he made the short horror film "Sud miortwych" (English: Judgment of the Dead) with Zoya Belachwoscik in the main role.

== Awards ==
- Nomination for the main prize in the category "Best Film" for the film "There Was Sasha" in the "Koroche" competition (2017);
- Special Prize for Episode 1 and nomination for the main prize for Episode 2 of the series "Processes" in the Belarusian Competition at the Northern Lights Nordic-Baltic Film Festival (2023);
- Honorary mention for Episode 1 of the series "Processes" in the "Fantastic Shorts" category at the Fantastic Fest festival in Austin, Texas (September 2023);
- Victory for the series "Processes" in the "Quick Killer" nomination at the International Festival "Serial Killer" in Brno, Czech Republic (2024).

== Works ==
Filmography
Title	Language	Length	Year	Role
Processes	Belarusian, Russian	series	2023	Director, screenwriter
Cukar	Belarusian, Russian	4 min.	2023	Director, screenwriter
ChinChins go nuts	Belarusian, Russian	21 min.	2023	Director, screenwriter, actor, cameraman
COOL (News from Belarus)	Russian		2023	Director, screenwriter, editor, actor
ChinChins in uniforms	Russian	series	since 2023	Director, screenwriter
Dietski film	Russian		2021	Actor
ChinChins in Wonderland	Belarusian, Russian	56 min.	2020	Director, screenwriter, editor
Sluchaynyi kadr	Russian	series		Actor
Gusin	Russian	series	2018 or 2019	Director, screenwriter, editor, producer, cameraman
Hasta La Vista, Baby	Russian	5 min.	2017	Director, screenwriter, editor, producer
Druzya po perepiske	Russian	short	2017	Producer
Akuaka	Russian	11 min.	2017	Director, producer, cameraman, artist
Samyi vkusnyi kofe	Russian	short	2017	Screenwriter, editor, producer, cameraman
There Was Sasha	Belarusian, Russian	6 min.	2016	Director, screenwriter, editor, producer
Cactus	Russian	17 min.	2016	Director, screenwriter, editor, producer
Vozvrashcheniye Mukhtara 10	Russian	series	2015	Actor
Muzyka vnutri	Russian	15 min.	2015	Director, screenwriter, editor, producer, actor
Nie vozvrashchaisya	Russian	8 min.	2013 or 2014	Director, screenwriter, editor
Knopka	Russian	35 min.	2014	Director, screenwriter, editor
V kino	Russian	8 min.	2014	Director, screenwriter, editor, actor
Pod dozhdiom	Russian	short	2013	Director
Indijskoe filmo	Russian	8 min.	2012	Director, screenwriter
