= Baltic Centre for Contemporary Art =

Art gallery in Gateshead, Tyne and Wear, England

Coordinates: 54°58′09″N 1°35′52″W

BALTIC Centre for Contemporary Art

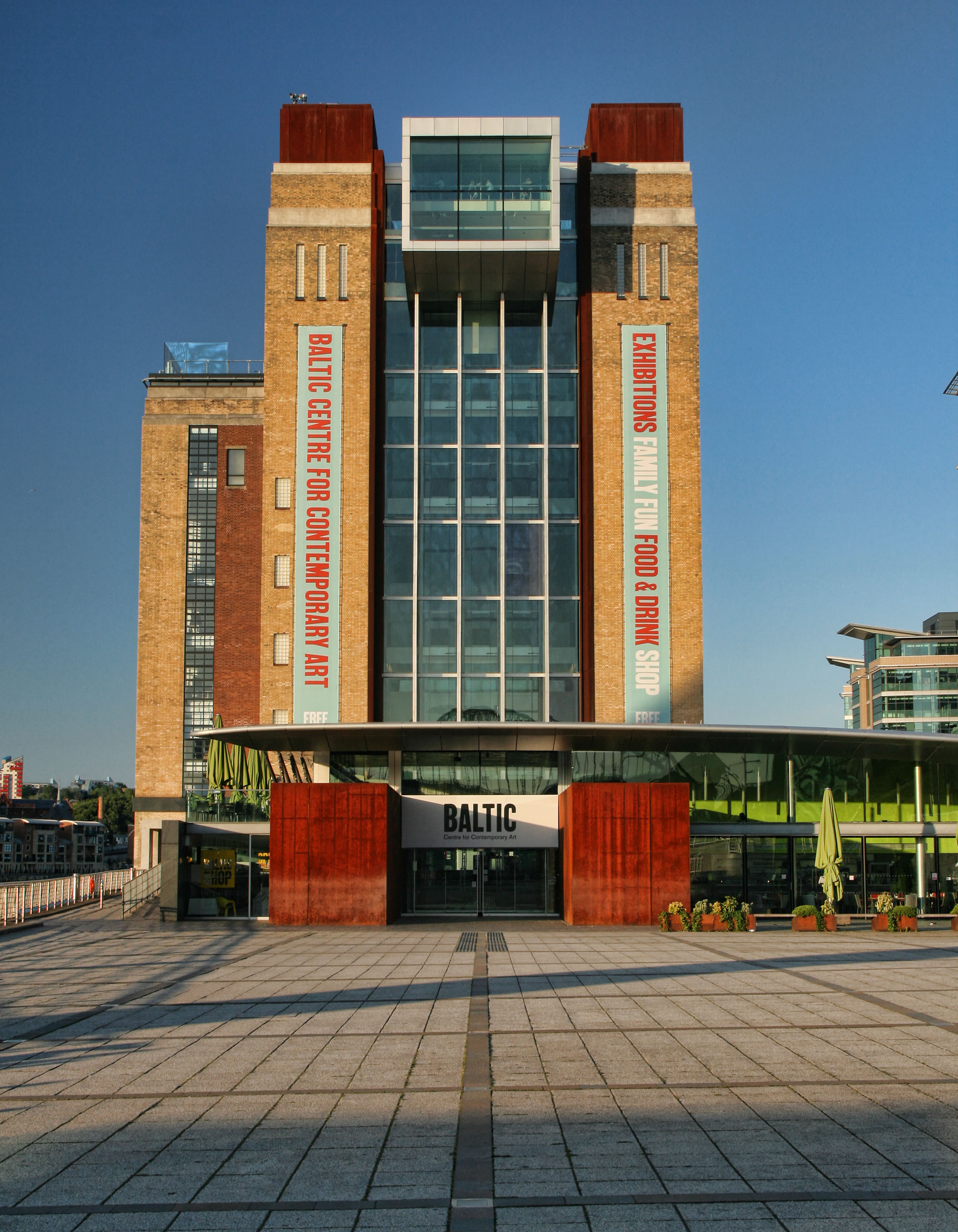
- BALTIC Centre for Contemporary Art entrance

- Location within Tyne and Wear
- Established: 2002
- Location: Gateshead, Tyne and Wear, England
- Type: Contemporary art gallery
- Visitors: 8,000,000 (November 2020)
- Director: Sarah Munro
- Website: baltic.art

Baltic Centre for Contemporary Art (also known simply as (the) Baltic, stylised as BALTIC) is a centre for contemporary art located on the south bank of the River Tyne in Gateshead, Tyne and Wear, England. It hosts a frequently changing variety of exhibitions, events, and educational programmes with no permanent exhibition. The idea to open a centre for contemporary arts in Gateshead was developed in the 1990s, which was a time of regeneration for the local area—the Sage and Gateshead Millennium Bridge was also being conceived of in this period.

Baltic opened in July 2002 in a converted flour mill, which had operated in various capacities from 1950 to 1984. The architectural design of Baltic was devised by Dominic Williams of Ellis Williams Architects, who won a competition to design the new contemporary arts centre in 1994. The building features exhibition spaces, a visitor centre, a rooftop restaurant and external viewing platforms which offer views of the River Tyne. Baltic's current director, the centre's fifth, is Sarah Munro, who joined in November 2015. As of January 2022, Baltic had welcomed over 8 million visitors.

== Development ==
=== Baltic Flour Mills ===
The Flour Mills building viewed from Newcastle in 2026

Baltic Flour Mills was built by Joseph Rank of Rank Hovis to a late-1930s design by Hull-based architects Gelder and Kitchen. The first foundations were laid in the late 1930s, and although construction ceased during the Second World War, the mill was completed and started operating in 1950. Known locally as "the pride of Tyneside", 300 people were employed by the mill at its height. The building was composed of two parallel brick façades running east to west, sandwiched between a foundation of concrete silos. The structure could store 22,000 tons of grain. The design of the building also featured a larger silo in which to store and clean wheat. The site was extended in 1957 by the addition of Blue Cross Mill which processed animal feed. In 1976, a fire forced both mills to close, but the silos remained in operation until 1984 to store a portion of the grain owned by the European Economic Community. Baltic Flour Mills was one of a number of mills located along the banks of the Tyne, all of which, due to their size, were prominent local landmarks. The Spillers mill just downstream from Baltic on the north bank of the river was demolished in 2011. Another large mill was owned by the CWS and was located just upstream of Dunston Staiths.

=== Arts centre inception ===
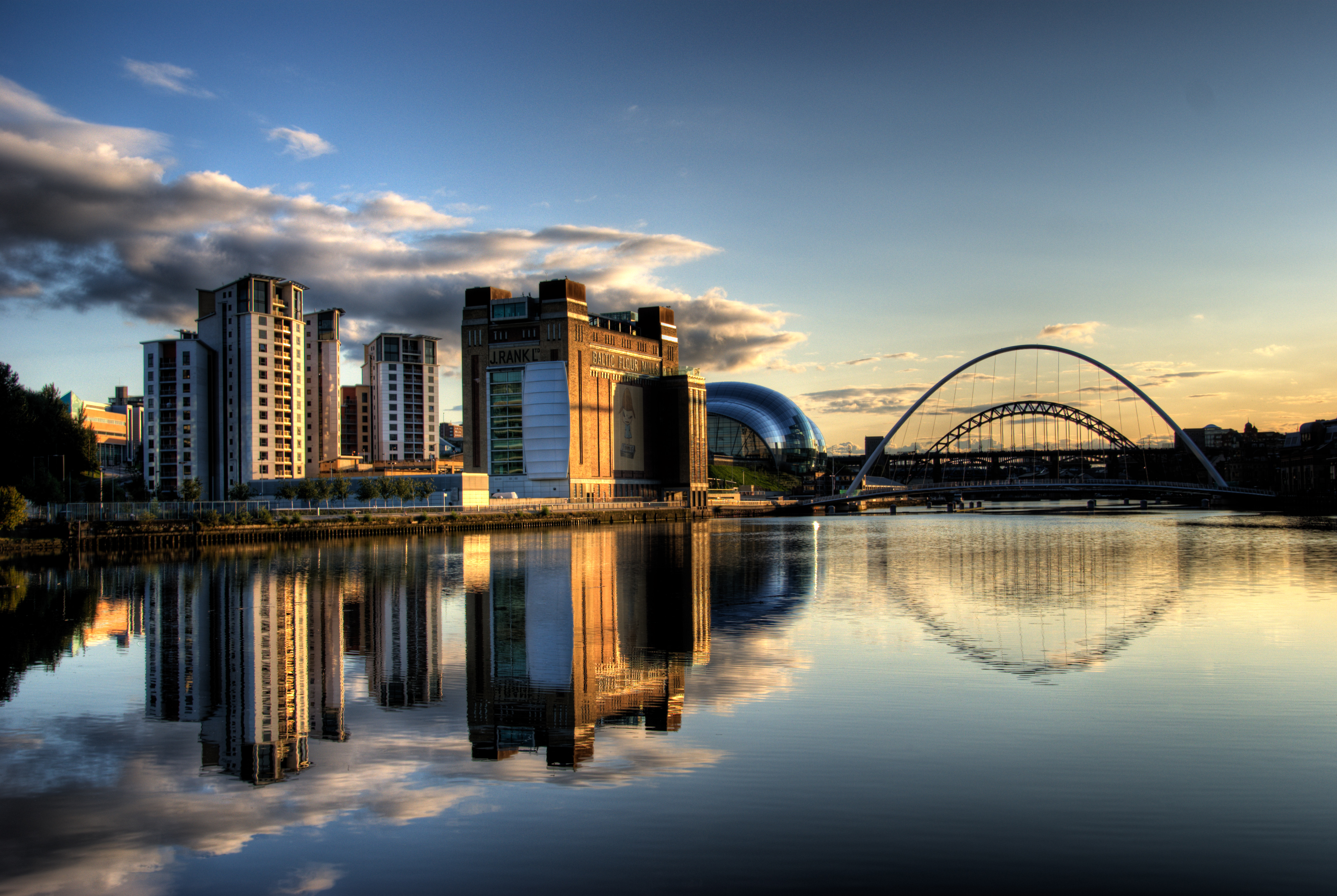
Newcastle and Gateshead Quayside. The conversion of the Baltic Flour Mills was part of the wider regeneration of Gateshead in the 1990s.

The opening of Baltic as a designated centre for contemporary art was part of the revitalisation and post-industrial regeneration of Gateshead's riverside. The regeneration began in the early 1990s and transformed the Quayside into a centre of modern architecture, including the Sage and Millennium Bridge. In 1991, Northern Arts (now part of Arts Council England) released a five-year plan in which it stated its intention to create "major new capital facilities for the Contemporary Visual Arts and Music in Central Tyneside". Northern Arts were keen to convert an old building into a centre for art, rather than build a new one, and the Labour-run Gateshead Council expressed interest in converting the old Flour Mills. Gateshead Council purchased the Baltic Flour Mills silo building, and in 1994 they invited the Royal Institute of British Architects to open a competition which would find an architect to design the new arts centre.

The BALTIC and the Millennium Bridge viewed from Newcastle in 2026

== Architecture ==
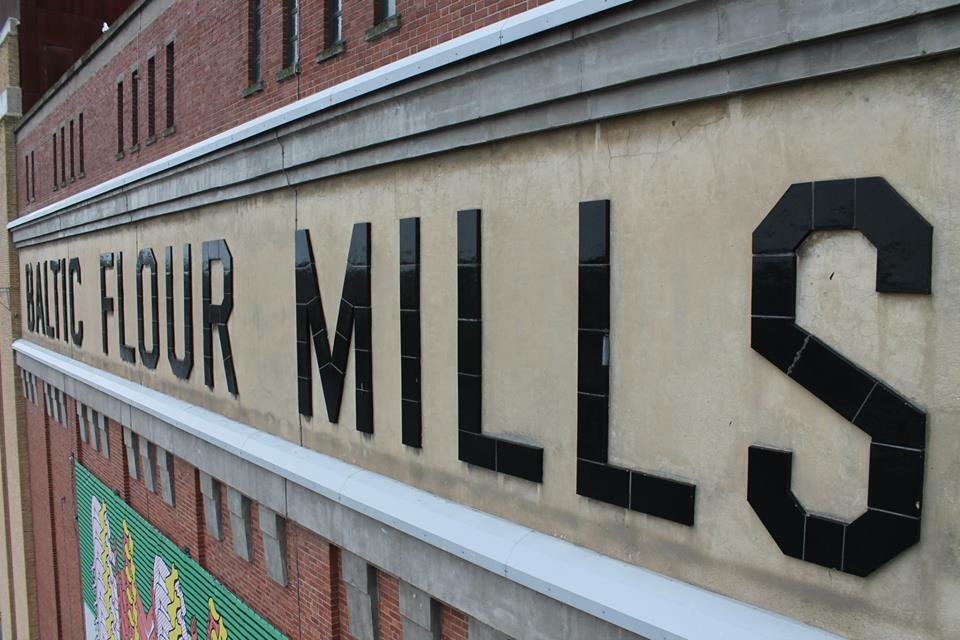
Side-view of the BALTIC FLOUR MILLS lettering. The preservation of the original lettering signifies the building's relationship to its history.

In 1994, Gateshead Council invited the Royal Institute of British Architects to hold a competition to select a design for the conversion of the Baltic Flour Mills. The objective of the competition was to "provide a national and international Centre for Contemporary visual arts". The brief cited a number of similar examples of old buildings which had been converted into arts centres around the world, including a converted flour mill in Porto, Portugal and the Bankside Power Station in London (now the site of the Tate Modern). After evaluating a total of 140 entries, Dominic Williams – a relatively unknown architect who had only been working for three years – won the competition. He entered the competition with Ellis Williams Architects, his father's firm. Andrew Guest remarks that this "simple, honest, industrial" design was an example of architecture which recognised the designs and context of the past. Williams and Ellis Williams Architects stated their intention to "retain as much of the existing character and fabric of the building as possible" while also clearly presenting the structure's new purpose as an art gallery.

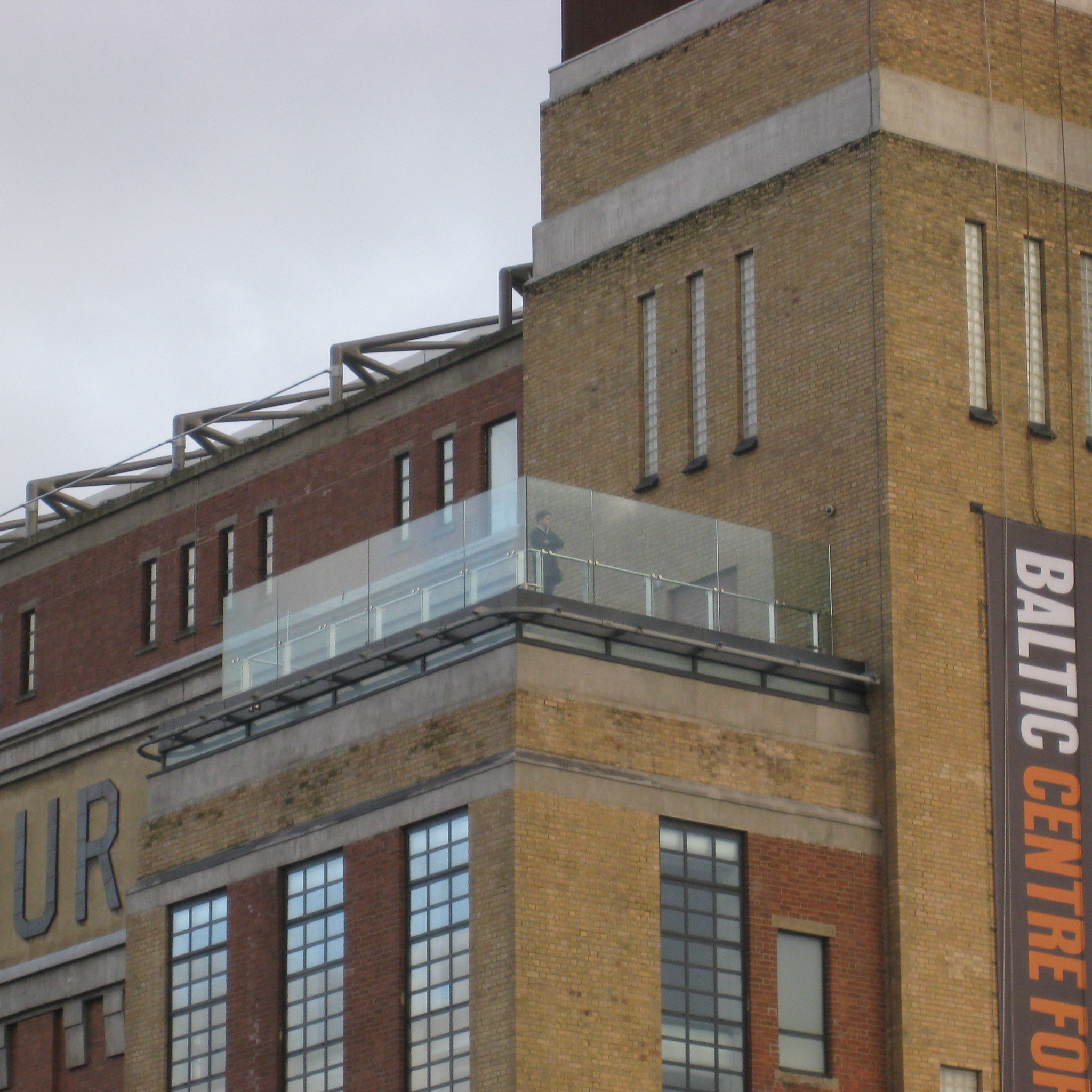
The exterior viewing platform at Baltic.

The conversion of the flour mills was a complex and technically challenging task. The grain silos were removed, leaving the brick façades unsupported, and a 1,000 tonne steel frame was required to support the remaining building. Four new main floors were inserted into the building supported by a row of pillars. Intermediary floors made out of steel frames and thin concrete were also inserted. These were designed to be removable as to adapt the building and create variable spaces for art. With 13 separate levels in total, Williams claimed he purposefully wanted to create a sense of disorientation for visitors within the building and allow an element of discovery. A spiral staircase winds up the building towards an open-plan office for staff. An efficient ductwork system was installed within the beams which carries heated or chilled air throughout the building. Such a design, conceived of by environmental engineers Atelier Ten, was uncommon for the time. The north and south elevations of the original building were retained along with the original BALTIC FLOUR MILLS lettering and red and yellow bricks. The east and west sides were fully glazed, capturing natural light and allowing views of the River Tyne. Additionally, service towers in the corners of the building, a rooftop viewing box, and a low-rise visitor centre were completed—these now comprise part of the building's major elements. The building stands at 138 feet (42 m) tall. Glass elevators situated close to the exterior offer views of Newcastle, Gateshead and the River Tyne. A restaurant sits at the top of the building, built in a manner which still allows natural light to reach the top gallery floor. The building's interior largely features glass, concrete, aluminium, Welsh Slate, 'Cor-Ten' steel, and Swedish pine. The furniture, purposely built to be flexible and adaptable, was designed by Swedish designer Åke Axelsson.

=== Awards ===
Baltic won a RIBA award in 2003, a Civic Trust Award in 2004, and in 2006 was selected as one of the top 10 most outstanding arts and culture schemes in the UK as part of the Gulbenkian Prize. In 2012, it won the National Lottery Awards prize for Best Arts Project.

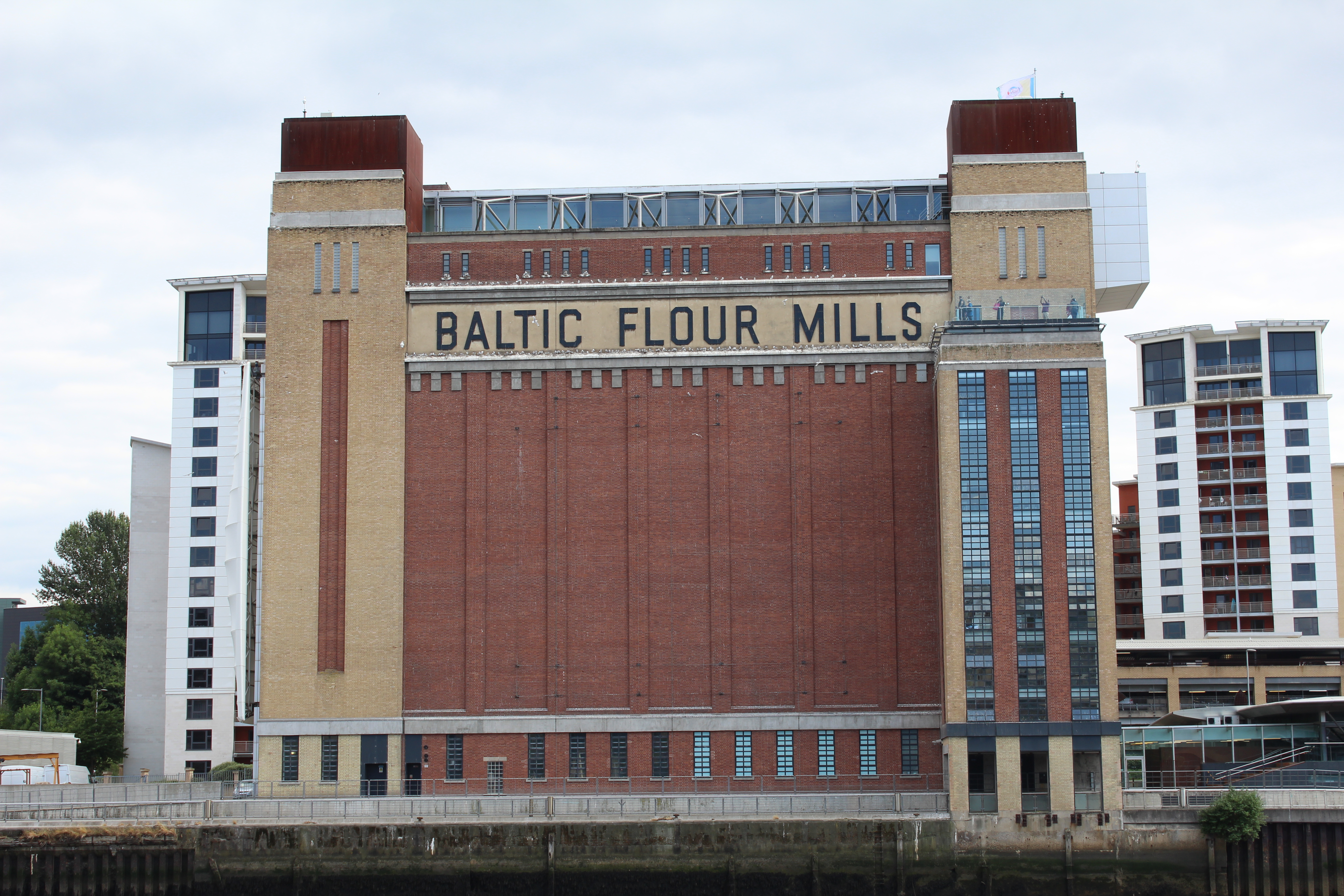
The brick façade of Baltic with its distinctive red and yellow bricks and original lettering.

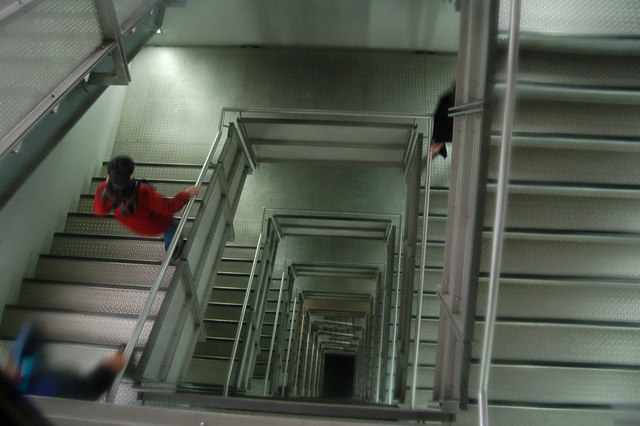
Looking down the stairwell of Baltic. The building has five main levels and 13 floors in total.

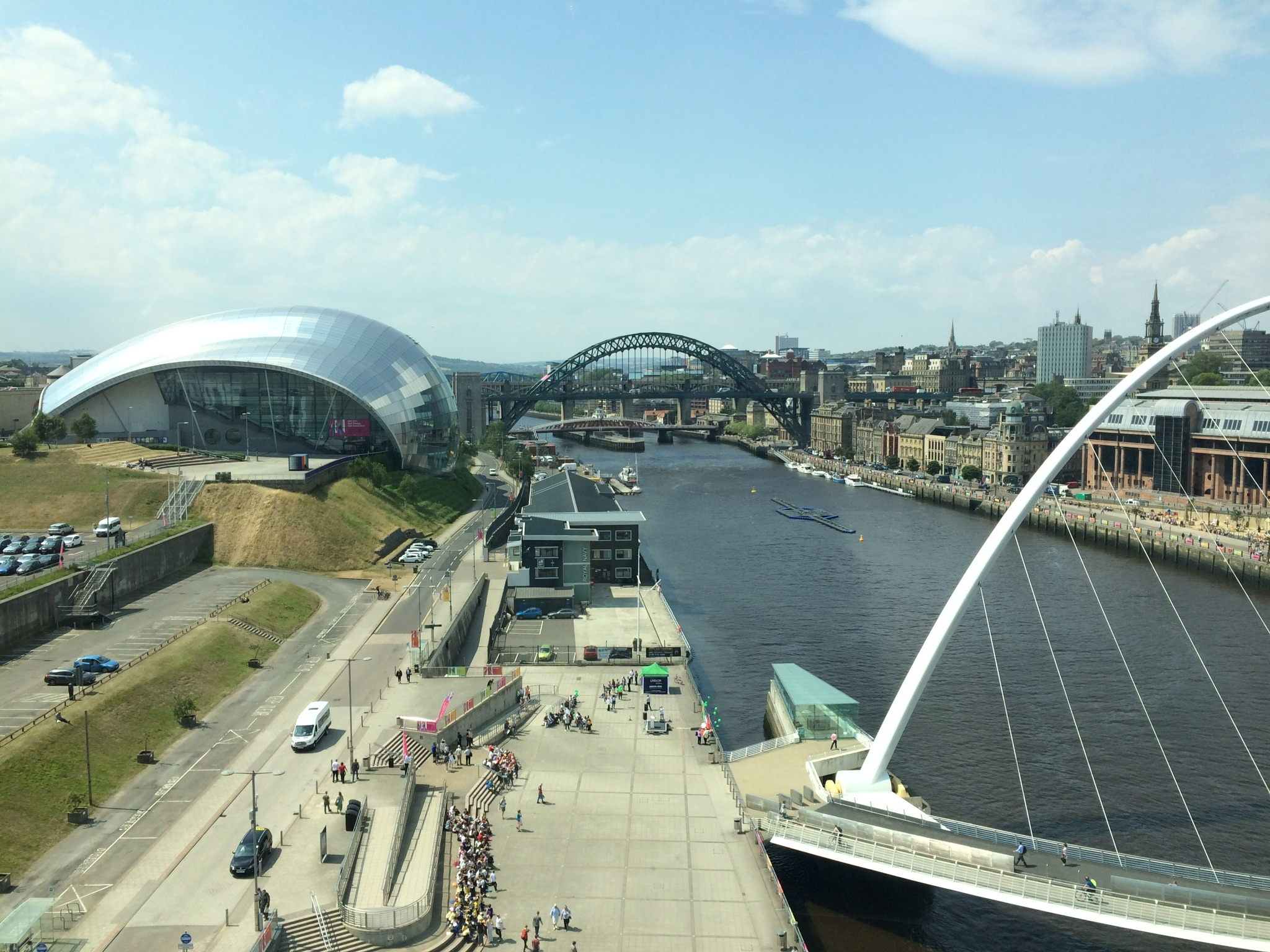
View from the west-facing window of Baltic. The Sage, Gateshead Millennium Bridge, and Tyne Bridge are all visible.

== Management ==
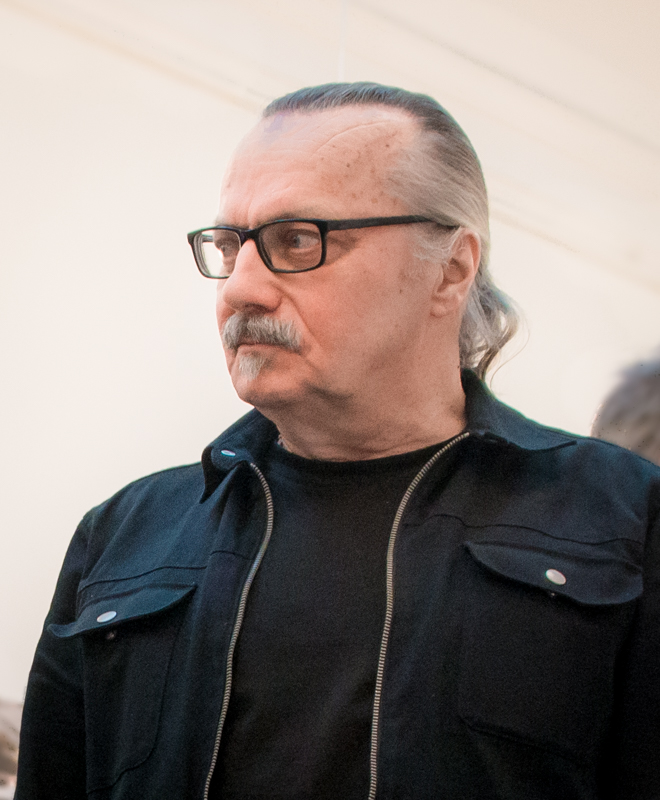
Sune Nordgren, founding director of Baltic. He remained in this position until 2003.

The founding director, Sune Nordgren, was appointed in 1997. He oversaw the period prior to Baltic's opening, including the construction of the gallery. After almost six years, Nordgren left to take up a new post as founding director of the National Museum for Art, Architecture and Design, Oslo, Norway. At this time, Baltic was facing financial problems. After Nordgren's departure, a former Baltic chairman accused the centre of overspending on commissions during Nordgren's tenure. Baltic's situation was described by Arts Council England as having "serious inadequacies in financial procedures". Nordgren was briefly succeeded by Stephen Snoddy, who had previously run a new gallery in Milton Keynes. Snoddy only remained with the organisation for 11 months, citing difficulties in leaving his family behind in Manchester while working at Baltic. He was succeeded as director by Peter Doroshenko in 2005. Doroshenko's previous institutions included the Stedelijk Museum voor Actuele Kunst and the Institute of Visual Arts in Milwaukee. He was brought to Baltic to increase visitor numbers and resolve the centre's financial situation, which was criticised by Arts Council England and an insider as being chaotic. Doroshenko organised several exhibitions during his time at Baltic, including Spank the Monkey.

In November 2007, Doroshenko left the gallery to head up the PinchukArtCentre in Kyiv, Ukraine. He stated that he believed he had made Baltic a more "approachable and visitor friendly place." However, Design Week reported that there were claims that Doroshenko did not deliver the expected "international programme of artistic excellence." Additionally, staff at the centre had complained about his "intolerable" and "bullying" management style. Godfrey Worsdale, founding director of the Middlesbrough Institute of Modern Art, was appointed as director of Baltic in 2008. Worsdale oversaw the 10 year anniversary of Baltic and the hosting of the Turner Prize in 2011. He was awarded an honorary degree from Northumbria University in 2012 in recognition for his work on contemporary art after being on the judging panel for the Turner Prize. He departed in 2015 to take up a new post as director of the Henry Moore Foundation. Sarah Munro became director in November 2015. She was previously artistic director of Tramway in Glasgow and head of arts for Glasgow Life.

== History as arts centre ==
=== Pre-opening events ===
During the four-year construction of Baltic, the new organisation arranged a series of events, publications, and artists in residence in anticipation of the centre's opening. In 1999, after the silos had been removed and before the new floors were inserted, the shell of the building was used to house an art installation by Anish Kapoor. Taratantara was a trumpet-shaped installation of PVC 50 metres (160 ft) long and was situated within the centre of the mill. This installation drew 16,000 visitors and marked a turning point between the building's old purpose and its new life as a centre for art. In October 2000, Jenny Holzer's Truisms – a series of aphorisms and slogans – were projected onto the side of the building. Kapoor and Holtzer's works were intended to engage casual passers-by in an artistic dialogue. The identity of Baltic was also solidified by the publication of 16 newsletters between October 1998 and July 2002 when the centre opened to the public. A significant part of this branding was the use of the now registered typeface BALTIC Affisch, designed by Swedish designers Ulf Greger Nilsson and Henrik Nygren and based on the BALTIC FLOUR MILLS lettering on the building's brick façade.

=== Opening ===
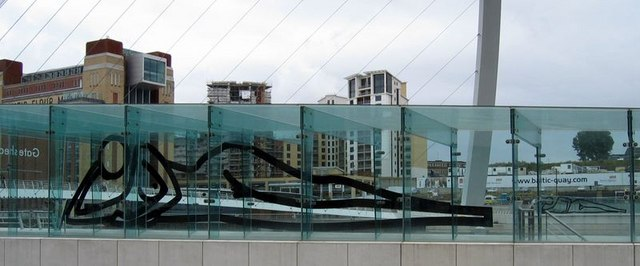
A reclining nude on the Gateshead Millennium Bridge by Julian Opie. Similar designs were used in the B.OPEN event in Baltic.

After ten years in the planning and a capital investment of £50m, including £33.4m from the Arts Council Lottery Fund, Baltic opened to the public at midnight on Saturday 13 July 2002. The novelty of opening the new building at midnight was intentional: founding director Sune Nordgren sought a dramatic gesture to herald the beginning of the new centre for arts. The inaugural exhibition, B.OPEN, had work by Chris Burden, Carsten Höller, Julian Opie, Jaume Plensa and Jane and Louise Wilson. Opie, who had previously assisted Dominic Williams with aspects of the building's conversion design, contributed an installation consisting of nude outlines on the walls of floor of the gallery. Plensa's installation featured a room filled with gongs which were available for the audience to play. Plensa also contributed Blake in Gateshead – a beam of light which stretched around 2 kilometres (6,600 ft) into the sky. The installation was placed through the glass doorway of the ground floor. Burden constructed a 1/20th scale replica of the Tyne Bridge out of Meccano. Jane and Louise Wilson created Dreamtime, a video of a rocket launch. An early exhibit by the Japanese artist Yoshitomo Nara was also included. The B.OPEN event attracted over 35,000 visitors in the first week. A live art performance, including Tatsumi Orimito's Bread Man and Anne Bjerge Hansen's Moving Bakery, took place during the opening weekend, in which bread was handed out to passers-by in memory of the Baltic Flour Mill's history. When BALTIC opened, there was a target set for 250,000 visitors a year. It achieved one million visitors in its first year, and by its 10-year anniversary in 2012, 4 million people had visited.

=== Notable events ===
==== Thanksgiving ====
On 20 September 2007, Baltic management contacted Northumbria Police for advice regarding whether or not a photograph should be displayed as part of the Thanksgiving installation, a forthcoming exhibition by American photographer Nan Goldin. The photograph, along with the rest of the installation, is part of the Sir Elton John Photography Collection. Entitled Klara and Edda belly-dancing features two naked young girls and had previously been exhibited around the world without objections. The installation, which had been scheduled for a four-month exhibition, opened with the remaining photographs whilst Klara and Edda belly-dancing was in possession of the police. However, it closed after just nine days at the request of Elton John. Although this had a detrimental effect on Baltic's reputation in the short-term, Graham Whitham argues in Understand Contemporary Art that it may have given it a higher profile and greater publicity in the long-run.

==== Beryl Cook ====
In 2007, the largest survey of artist Beryl Cook's work to date was featured in an exhibition at Baltic. Cook enjoyed widespread recognition of her art towards the end of her life; the exhibition at Baltic took place one year before her death. Her paintings depict everyday and familiar social situations in a playful, colourful, and "portly" style. Peter Doreshenko, the director of Baltic at the time of the exhibition, was keen for the gallery to reject the seriousness audiences may associate with it. The exhibition of Cook's work was part of this populist effort to attract new audiences to the then financially-struggling gallery, whose visitor numbers had dropped to less than 500,000 and whose reputation was decreasing. Adrian Searle of The Guardian reviewed the exhibition and, whilst acknowledging that fans would enjoy it, commented "look too long and you may feel a bit queasy".

==== Turner Prize ====
In 2011, Baltic was the venue for the Turner Prize. This was the first time the event had been held outside of London or Liverpool Tate. The Turner Prize exhibition at Baltic attracted 149,770 visitors to the gallery – almost double the average attendance in London. The event at Baltic was also free, whilst Turner exhibitions at Tate Britain had always previously charged for entry. The winning exhibit was by Martin Boyce with the runners-up being Karla Black, Hilary Lloyd and George Shaw.

==== Judy Chicago ====
The first major retrospective of American artist Judy Chicago's work was exhibited in Baltic from November 2019 to April 2020. The exhibition included her abstract paintings, records of performance pieces, and began and ended with a four-metre tapestry which portrayed the creation the world from a woman's perspective. At the time of the exhibition, Chicago was in her 80s. Hannah Clugston of The Guardian noted that the more recent featured works embraced the theme of death, particularly End: A Meditation on Death and Extinction, which is based on the stages of grief.

==== Baltic Open Submission ====
In March 2020, Baltic announced it would be closing due to the COVID-19 pandemic until further notice. In May 2021, it reopened to visitors with four exhibitions. Baltic Open Submission featured works created during lockdown by 158 artists from the North East. The 158 artists were chosen from over 540 original submissions and selected by a panel of three North East-based artists. The final pieces included paintings, drawings, and sound and video installations.

== Community and cultural impact ==
At the opening of Baltic, director Sune Nordgren outlined the role of the arts centre within the public sphere. He stated that Baltic should be "a meeting place, a site for connections and confrontation between artists and the public." In an October 2002 lecture at the Power Plant Gallery in Toronto, Nordgren reaffirmed the importance of local outreach and explained his intention for Baltic to regard the local history and culture, comparing his intention to examples of modern art museums where this was not considered, such as the Guggenheim Museum in Bilbao (designed in Los Angeles and placed in Spain). From its inception, Baltic emphasised the importance of artist-public relationships and its role as a community hub. "Participate" initiatives encouraged people in the local community to interact with resident artists. A media learning centre in a local library was set up as an extension of Baltic's community resources.

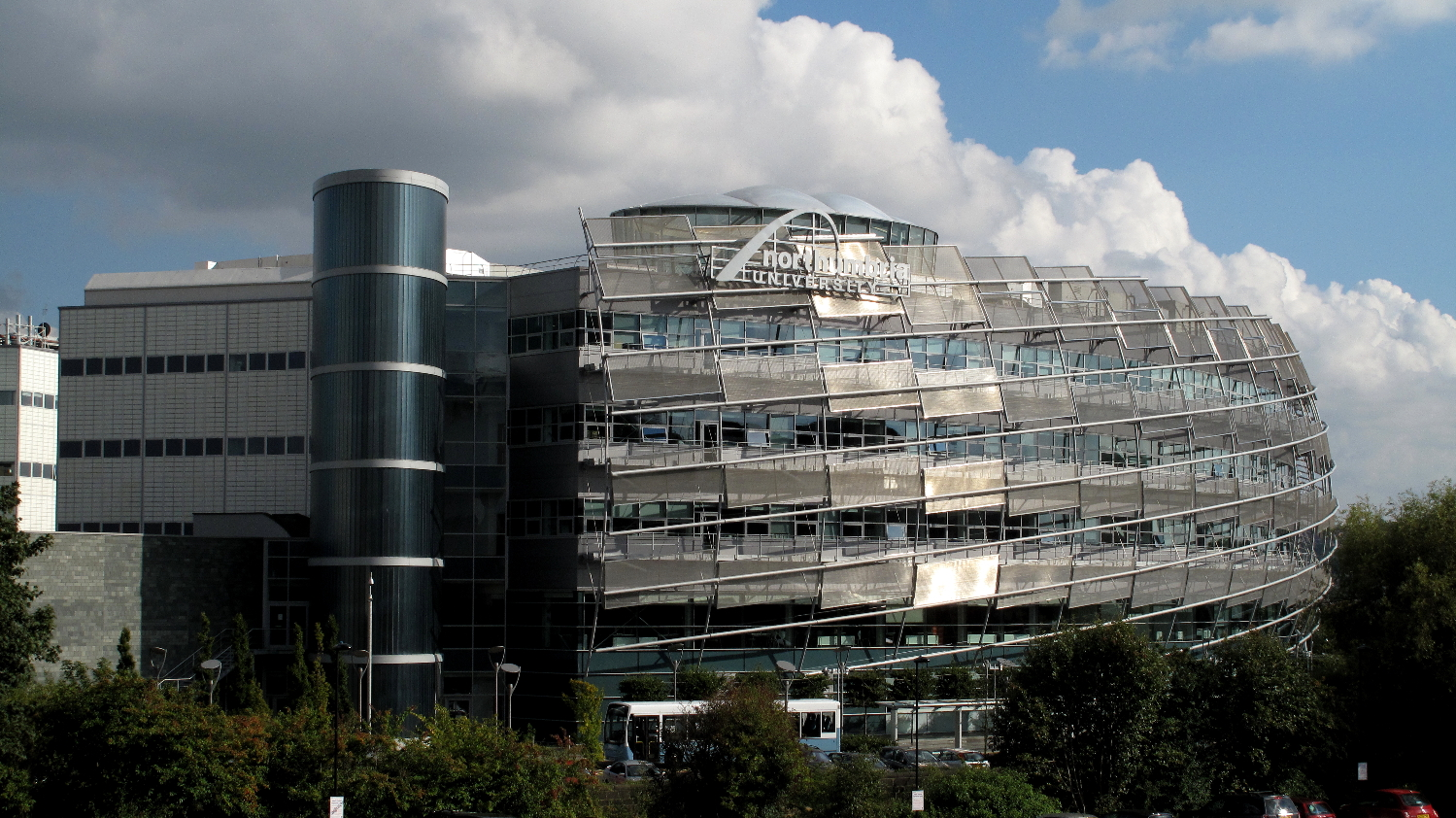
The BxNU Institute is a collaboration between Northumbria University (pictured) and Baltic.

In a 2016 talk on Baltic's 10-year strategic plan (officially named Untitled), the current director of Baltic – Sarah Munro – emphasised that the North East of England "has always led, not followed" the agenda for contemporary arts, and that Baltic had been a big part of this trend. She argued that the visual arts can be used to further the economic and social growth of the area, even amidst the backdrop of political issues and austerity. Baltic also launched an international award for emerging artists in 2016, which offered a £30,000 commission and an accompanying exhibition to four recipients. It was the first such competition in the UK to be judged entirely by artists: in 2017, they were Monica Bonvicini, Lorna Simpson, Pedro Cabrita Reis and Mike Nelson. Munro commented that the award was to foster "a dialogue with our audiences at a local, national and international level."

Local university partnerships and graduate internships are also important to Baltic's community and cultural influence. In 2011, Baltic and Northumbria University established an artistic partnership through the BxNU Institute of Contemporary Art, a centre for artistic and curatorial research. Christine Borland was appointed as Baltic Professor. A designated gallery space, known as Baltic 39, was established on the top floor of refurbished Edwardian warehouses at 31-39 High Bridge in Newcastle. It was designed by Viennese architects Jabornegg & Palffy and housed artwork from students at the university. Baltic 39 was based at High Bridge from 2012 to 2021.

Their annual Self-Publishing Artists' Market (aka S.P.A.M.) takes the form of a lively programme exploring print culture and practice through talks and workshops with over 50 stalls selling zines and artists' books. S.P.A.M. Spreads reimagines the market in printed form and has included contributions by artists, activists, illustrators, zine-makers, writers and curators including Vanessa Murrell, Melody Sproates, Okocha Obasi, Stephanie Francis-Shanahan.

== See also ==
- The Big Pitch
- Sage Gateshead
- Gateshead Millennium Bridge
