= The Big Pitch =

The Big Pitch is a competition run by the north-east UK based studio Moxie Makers. Competitors pitch their feature film ideas, to win with the UK's highest production fund prize - production finance from Moxie Makers for their film (a minimum of £150,000) together with a post-production deal with Molinare, guaranteed UK distribution with Soda Makers and international sales representation with Moxiehouse Entertainment.

== Background ==
The Big Pitch was launched on 6 December 2007 and was open for 10 weeks. Over 200 projects applied for the scheme including multi-award-winning filmmakers from around the UK. After thorough assessment of the applications a longlist of 30 was drawn up before 12 teams were invited for interview. After interviews the Moxie Panel selected 8 projects to enter The Big Pitch Training Programme based on talent, experience, marketability and quality.

The Big Pitch Training Programme kicked off with an intensive four-day induction and development workshop at the end of April. The workshop gave a structured overview of micro-budget feature film development and production with recognized industry experts speaking on their relevant areas of expertise. Whilst the eight teams were at the workshop to learn, they were also competing for just six places on the four-month development programme.

Following the workshop the teams then had three weeks to devise and deliver their project development plans in advance of the next elimination meeting in Cannes Film Festival on 16 May 2008. The Panel reconvened to eliminate two projects based on the strength of the projects and their progress during and after the workshop. The panel consisted of Christine Alderson and Hayley Manning (Moxie Makers), Lorianne Hall (Ipso Facto Films), Eve Gabereau (Soda Pictures), Mark Vennis (Moviehouse Entertainment) and Denise Parkinson (Bauer Media).

The six selected projects then spent four-months working to perfect their project and presentation as a whole. They worked with feedback from: a project mentor, a script editor, a poster/marketing pack designer, a casting director, a UK distributor and an international sales agent.

On 17 October 2008, the panel convened and made the final selection based on script quality, marketing plan, poster concept, UK Box Office potential, International potential, Awards Prospects and the applicants ability to deliver.

== The Finalists ==
Four teams reached the final. Audiences were encouraged to vote online for their favourite project by visiting The Big Pitch website. Voting opened on Wednesday 19 November 2008 and closed on the day of the final.

== The Final ==
The competition final took place in conjunction with Northern Lights Film Festival, which is held annually in Newcastle-upon-Tyne, UK.

On 6 December 2008, at the BALTIC Centre for Contemporary Art, the four finalists appeared on stage and had fifteen minutes to convince a live audience that their film should be made. The footage was filmed and available to download after the event.

Once the final team presented the audience votes were counted and the winner was announced at the awards ceremony that same evening. After all the votes were counted it was announced that there were literally just a few votes separating first and second place. Second place went to Derek Boyes' neo-noir thriller Blackout but the winners of The Big Pitch 08/09 with their psychological thriller Different Shades of Graham were Keith Lynch, David Lynch, Brad Watson and Simon Thomas.

Different Shades of Graham was produced during 2009 and premiered at the Northern Lights Film Festival 2009.
