= Volia Chajkouskaya =

Belarusian producer and film director

- Born: December 20, 1987 (age 38)
- Occupations: Film director, producer

Volia Chajkouskaya is a producer, film director and film festival manager of Belarusian origin. She studied directing and producing documentary films at the Baltic Film and Media School. In 2016, she founded a production company Volia Films. Her debut as a producer was Dmitrii Kalashnikov's The Road Movie (2016). Her credits as a producer include: Yoyogi (2022), Prazdnik (2019), 72 Hours (2019), My Granny from Mars (2018), etc.

Chajkouskaya is a voting member of the European Film Academy and a member of the Emerging Producers Network 2018.

Chajkouskaya is the founder and program director of the Belarusian Northern Lights Film Festival and one of the founders of the Belarusian Film Academy (BIFA).

In 2018, Chajkouskaya emigrated to Estonia and started working as a producer at AllFilm.

Her directorial debut, Common Language short, premiered at Jihlava IDFF in 2014.

As of 2024, Chajkouskaya is working on her feature debut The Wife of....

== Filmography ==
=== Producer ===
- 72 Hours (2024)
- Yoyogi (2022)
- Prazdnik (2019)
- Pure Art (2019)
- My Granny from Mars (2018)
- Test-730 (2017)
- The Road Movie (2016)

=== Director ===
- My Idea of Myself (2020)
- Common Language (2014, short)
