= Jenny Holzer =

American conceptual artist

- Born: July 29, 1950 (age 76); Gallipolis, Ohio, U.S.
- Education: Duke University; University of Chicago; Ohio University (BFA); Whitney Museum Independent Study Program; Rhode Island School of Design (MFA)
- Notable work: Truisms (1977–79); Texts on Times Square Spectacolor board (1982 & 1985); Installation for the Solomon R. Guggenheim Museum (1989 & 2024); The Venice Installation (1990); Light projections on Louvre Pyramid (2001 & 2009)
- Movement: Conceptual art; Public art; Word art; Light art
- Website: jennyholzer.com

Jenny Holzer (born July 29, 1950) is an American neo-conceptual artist based in Hoosick, New York and New York City. Her work focuses on the delivery of words and ideas in public spaces and includes large-scale installations, advertising billboards, projections on buildings and other structures, and electronic visual displays.

Holzer belongs to the feminist branch of a generation of artists who emerged around 1980. She was an active member of Colab during this time, participating in The Times Square Show.

Among the most notable honors she has received for her contributions to the arts are the Leone d'Oro (1990), the World Economic Forum's Crystal Award (1996), the rank of Officier des Arts et des Lettres (2016), the U.S. State Department's International Medal of Arts (2017), and the Time 100 Award (2024), as well as honorary doctorates from Williams College, the Rhode Island School of Design, the New School, and Smith College.

== Early life and education ==
Holzer was born on July 29, 1950, in Gallipolis, Ohio and grew up in Lancaster, Ohio, where her father owned a Ford Motor Company dealership. Originally aspiring to become an abstract painter, she took general art courses at Duke University (1968–70) and then studied painting, printmaking, and drawing at the University of Chicago before completing her BFA at Ohio University in 1972. After taking summer courses at the Rhode Island School of Design in 1974, she entered its MFA program in 1975. She moved to Manhattan in 1976, joined the Whitney Museum's Independent Study Program, and began her first work with language, installation and public art. She received her MFA from RISD in 1977 and was an active member of Colab from 1977 to around 1981, participating in The Times Square Show and other Colab projects. Holzer worked as a typesetter for Laundry News, a laundromat-industry trade newspaper, to pay the bills at the beginning of her career, and this work influenced her artistic practice.

== Style, form and media ==
Holzer is known as a neo-conceptual artist. Most of her work is presented in public spaces and includes words and ideas, in the form of word art (also known as text art.). The public dimension is integral to Holzer's work. Her large-scale installations have included advertising billboards, projections on buildings and other architectural structures, and illuminated electronic displays. LED signs have become her most visible medium, although her diverse practice incorporates a wide array of media including street posters, painted signs, stone benches, paintings, photographs, sound, video, projections, the Internet, t-shirts for Willi Smith, and a race car for BMW. Text-based light projections have been central to Holzer's practice since 1996. From 2010, her LED signs started becoming more sculptural. Holzer is no longer the author of her texts, and in the ensuing years, she returned to her roots by painting. Holzer’s LED works are often time-based, with texts programmed to scroll, flash, or repeat over extended durations. This use of movement and repetition aligns her work with systems of public information such as news tickers and advertising displays, emphasizing the relationship between language, technology, and public space. Scholars and curators have noted that the temporal nature of these electronic texts affects how viewers encounter and interpret the messages, as the phrases unfold gradually rather than being read all at once.

Holzer only uses capital letters in her work and frequently words or phrases are italicized. She has stated that this is because she wants to "show some sense of urgency and to speak a bit loudly".

Holzer belongs to the feminist branch of a generation of artists that emerged around 1980, looking for new ways to make narrative or commentary an implicit part of visual objects. Other female contemporaries include Barbara Kruger, Cindy Sherman, Sarah Charlesworth, and Louise Lawler.

The subject of Holzer's work often relates to feminism and sexism. Her work discusses heavy subjects such as sexual assault against women. She has said that she gravitates towards subjects such as this due to family dysfunction she has experienced and because she claims "we don't need work on joy."

== Works ==
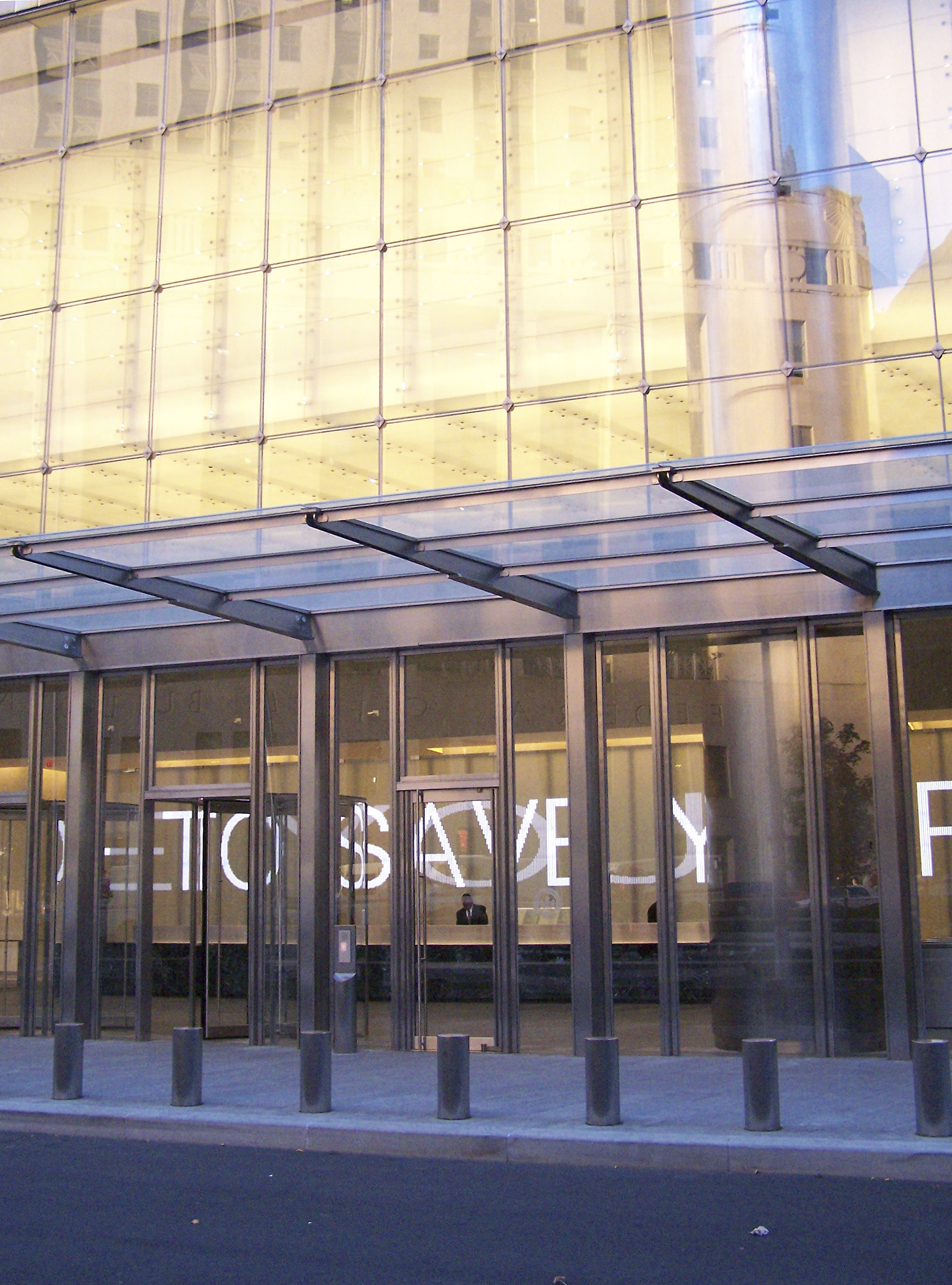
Installation in lobby at 7 WTC

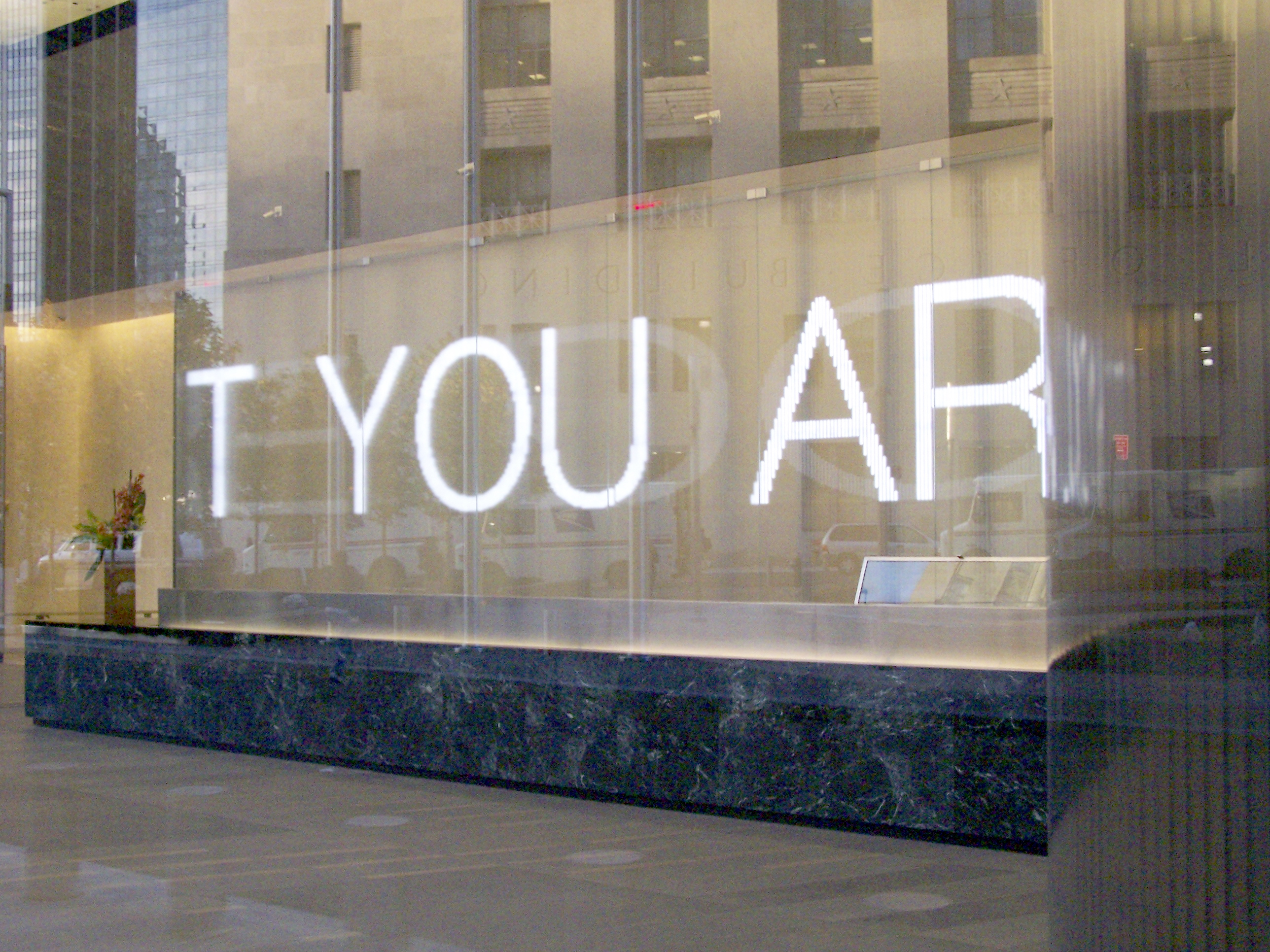
Detail of 7 WTC installation

Holzer's initial public works, Truisms (1977–79), are among her best-known. They first appeared as anonymous broadsheets that she printed in black italic script in capital letters on white paper and wheat-pasted to buildings, walls and fences in and around Manhattan. Holzer developed Truisms by condensing complex theoretical texts into brief statements that she distributed on public posters in Manhattan. The project invited viewers to question commonly accepted ideas through simple but provocative phrases. These one-liners are a distillation of an erudite reading list from the Whitney Independent Study Program, where she was a student. She printed other Truisms on posters, T-shirts and stickers, and carved them into stone benches. In late 1980, Holzer's mail art and street leaflets were included in the exhibition Social Strategies by Women Artists at London's Institute of Contemporary Arts, curated by Lucy Lippard.

In 1981, Holzer initiated the Living series, printed on aluminum and bronze plaques, the presentation format used by medical and government buildings. The Living series addressed the necessities of daily life: eating, breathing, sleeping, and human relationships. Her bland, short instructions were accompanied by paintings by American artist Peter Nadin, whose portraits of men and women attached to metal posts further articulated the emptiness of both life and message in the information age.

Inflammatory Essays was a work consisting of posters Holzer created from 1979 to 1982 and put up throughout New York. The statements on the posters were influenced by political figures including Emma Goldman, Vladimir Lenin, and Mao Tse-tung. In 2018 an excerpt from that work was printed on a card stitched onto the back of the dress Lorde wore to the Grammys; the excerpt read, "Rejoice! Our times are intolerable. Take courage, for the worst is a harbinger of the best. Only dire circumstance can precipitate the overthrow of oppressors. The old & corrupt must be laid to waste before the just can triumph. Contradiction will be heightened. The reckoning will be hastened by the staging of seed disturbances. The apocalypse will blossom." Others at the Grammys wore white roses or all-white clothes to express solidarity with the Time's Up movement; Lorde wrote, "My version of a white rose — THE APOCALYPSE WILL BLOSSOM — an excerpt from the greatest of all time, jenny holzer."

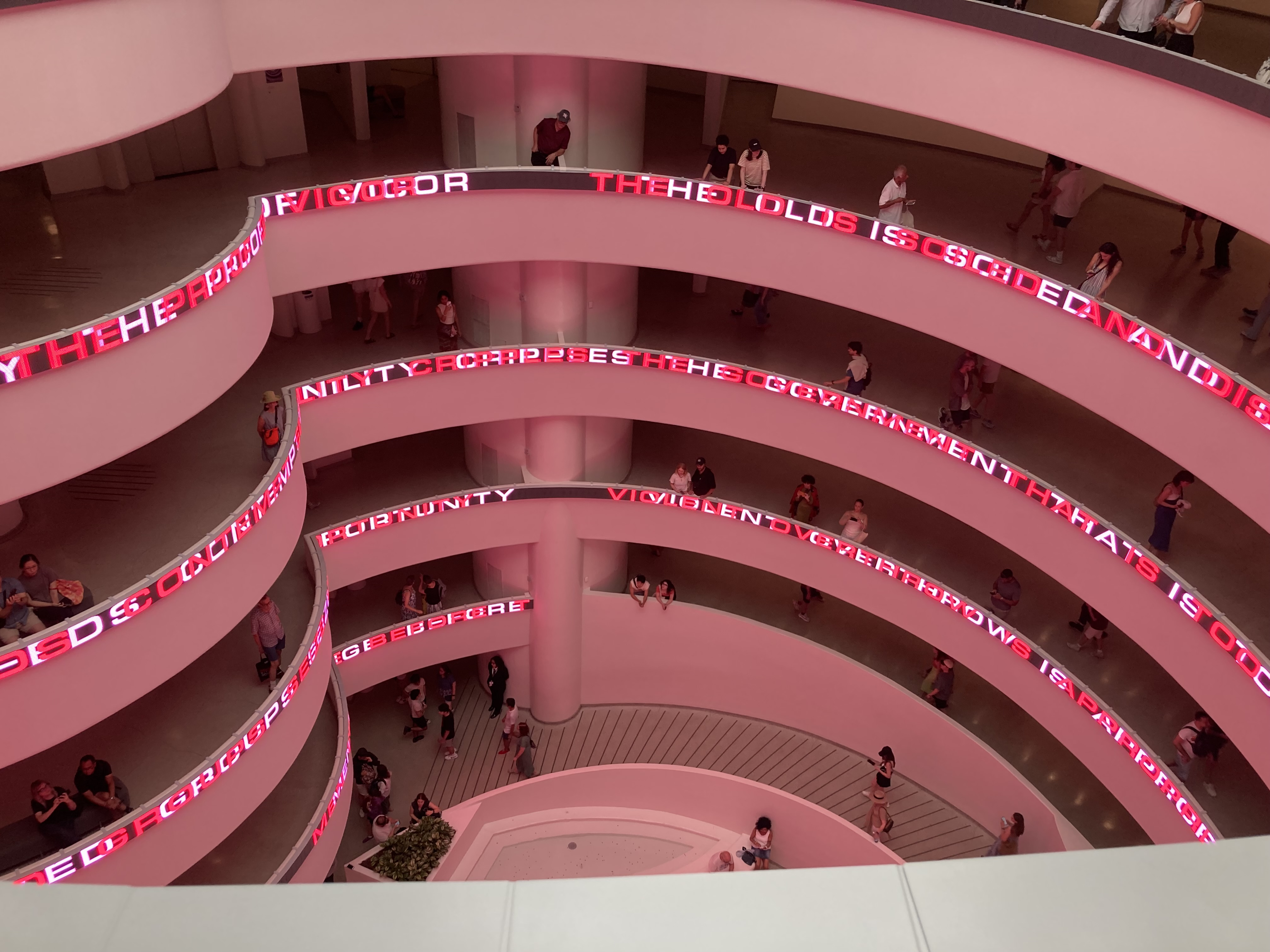
Light Lines at the Guggenheim Museum in 2024.

The medium of modern computer systems became an important component in Holzer's work in 1982, when the artist installed her first large electronic sign on the Spectacolor board in New York's Times Square. Sponsored by the Public Art Fund program, the use of light-emitting diodes (LEDs) allowed Holzer to reach a larger audience. The texts in her subsequent Survival series, compiled in 1983–85, speak to the great pain, delight, and ridiculousness of living in contemporary society. She began working with stone in 1986; for her exhibition that year at the Barbara Gladstone Gallery in New York, Holzer introduced a total environment where viewers were confronted with the relentless visual buzz of a horizontal LED sign and stone benches leading up to an electronic altar. Continuing this practice, her installation at the Guggenheim Museum in 1989 featured a 163-meter-long sign forming a continuous circle spiraling up a parapet wall. This installation was re-imagined by the Guggenheim in 2024 for her show, Light Line.

In 1989, Jenny Holzer released the Laments series to the Dia Art Foundation in New York; this installation consisted of columns of colored lights and carved marble and granite tops that made up the laments. Holzer uses the passages she had read while being a part of the Whitney Independent Study Program by simplifying them for public consumption and applying them to her phrases. This series not only provokes thought in her audience through the constant reminder of death and sorrow but also exposes them to sources they normally wouldn't come across. In an interview Holzer mentions that she uses the first person "I" simply to give the impression that a dead person is speaking and therefore make the installation more interesting to her audience. In Laments Jenny gave a voice to 13 different dead individuals, to say everything they might not have gotten the opportunity to while alive. She touches on topics like motherhood, violation, pain, torture, and even death on a personal level to these 13 individuals . Although Laments focuses mostly on the darkness of humanity and the tragedies we face daily there is also hidden optimism in the 13 laments.

In 1989, Holzer became the second female artist chosen to represent the United States at the Venice Biennale in Italy (Diane Arbus was the first, shown posthumously in 1972). At the 44th Biennale in 1990, her LED signboards and marble benches occupied a solemn and austere exhibition space in the American Pavilion; she also designed posters, hats, and T-shirts to be sold in the streets of Venice. The installation, Mother and Child, won Holzer the Leone D'Oro for best pavilion. The original installation is retained in its entirety in the collection of the Albright-Knox Art Gallery in Buffalo, the organizing institution for the American Pavilion at the 1990 Biennale.

After taking a break from the art world, Holzer returned with controversy in 1993. Holzer came out with her Lustmord series, taking the title from the German word meaning "sex murder". Holzer created the series as a response of the Bosnian War, specifically the widespread rape and murder of women. The work feature three poems that retell sex crimes from the perspective of the victim, the observer, and the perpetrator. Lustmord has taken many different forms from texts written in blue, black, and red ink on the skin, to the Lustmord Table, a series of different bones of the body laid on a wooden table, with silver bands wrapped around them, engraved with the text of the three poems.

While Holzer wrote the texts for the bulk of her work between 1977 and 2001, since 1993, she has mainly been using texts written by others, including literary texts from such authors as Polish Nobel laureate Wislawa Szymborska, Henri Cole (USA), Elfriede Jelinek (Austria), Fadhil Al Azzawi (Iraq), Yehuda Amichai (Israel), Mahmoud Darwish (Palestine), Khawla Dunia (Syria), and Mohja Kahf (Syrian American). As of 2010, Holzer's work has been focused on government documents, concerning Iraq and the Middle East. Using texts from a very different context, more recent projects have involved the use of redacted government documents and passages from declassified U.S. Army documents from the war in Iraq. For example, a large LED work presents excerpts from the minutes of interrogations of American soldiers accused of committing human rights violations and war crimes in Abu Ghraib prison — making what was once secret public and exposing the "military-commercial-entertainment complex".

Holzer's work often concerns violence, oppression, sexuality, feminism, power, war and death; the artist often utilizes the rhetoric of modern information systems to address the politics of discourse. Her main aim is to enlighten, illuminating something thought in silence and meant to remain hidden.

Critic Samito Jalbuena has written that the artist's public use of language and ideas often creates shocking juxtapositions — commenting on sexual identity and gender relations ("Sex Differences Are Here To Stay") on an unassuming New York movie theater marquee, for example — and sometimes extends to flights of formal outrage (such as "Abuse Of Power Comes As No Surprise" in lights over Times Square).

=== Selected works ===
- Inflammatory Essays (1979–82), an installation comprising texts and manifestos, which were originally printed on colored paper and wheat-pasted around the streets of New York City in the late 1970s and early 1980s. Inflammatory Essays is included in the permanent collections of Pérez Art Museum Miami.
- Living Series (early 1980s), using monumental media such as bronze plaques and billboards.
- Under a Rock (1986), a series juxtaposing electronic messages with poetic phrases etched on stone benches and sarcophagi.
- Laments (1989), a multi-media installation at the Dia Art Foundation featuring 13 stone sarcophagi.
- Da wo Frauen sterben, bin ich hellwach (1993), cover photograph and portfolio in edition number 46 of Süddeutsche Zeitung Magazin.
- Please Change Beliefs (1995), an interactive work created for the internet art gallery adaweb, incorporating several of the artist's Truisms.
- Protect Me From What I Want, the 15th work commissioned for the BMW Art Car Project. Painted on a BMW V12 LMR, the titular refrain is written in metal foil and outlined with phosphorescent paint. Phrases written on the car's side-pods are "You are so complex, you don't respond to danger" and "The unattainable is invariably attractive". The car's rear wing reads "Lack of charisma can be fatal" and "Monomania is a prerequisite of success". The car was withdrawn from the 1999 24 Hours of Le Mans race, but saw active competition in the 2000 Petit Le Mans in the U.S., finishing fifth overall.
- Xenon for Bordeaux and Paris (2001 & 2009), text projections on various landmarks, most notably the Louvre Pyramid, originally created for the 2001 Festival d'Automne. The Louvre projection was repeated in 2009 in honor of the pyramid's 20th anniversary.
- Terminal 5 — In October 2004, the dormant Eero Saarinen-designed TWA Flight Center (now Jetblue T5) at John F. Kennedy International Airport hosted an art exhibition called Terminal 5, curated by Rachel K. Ward and featuring the work of 18 artists. Holzer's work was displayed electronically on the terminal's original departures-arrivals board. She had wanted the work projected onto the building's exterior, but airport officials denied the request, saying the projection could interfere with runway operations.
- For the City (2005), nighttime projections of declassified government documents on the exterior of New York University's Bobst Library, and poetry on the exteriors of Rockefeller Center and the New York Public Library Main Branch in Manhattan This work has been cited as a significant example of word art.
- For Singapore (2006), projection on City Hall, Singapore on the occasion of the Singapore Biennale in 2006
- For the Capitol (2007), nighttime projections of quotes by Presidents John F. Kennedy and Theodore Roosevelt about the role of art and culture in American society. Projected from the Kennedy Center for the Performing Arts onto the Potomac River and Roosevelt Island in Washington, D.C.
- I Was In Baghdad Ochre Fade*, (2007), Oil-on-linen transcriptions of torture documents from the Iraq War; part of the Renaissance Society 2007 group show, "Meanwhile, In Baghdad..."
- For SAAM (2007), Holzer's first cylindrical column of light and text, created from white electronic LEDs and featuring texts from four of the artist's series — Truisms, Living (selections), Survival (selections) and Arno; commissioned by the Smithsonian American Art Museum.
- Redaction Paintings (2008), reproducing declassified memos, with much of the text blacked out by censors.
- For Leonard Cohen (2017), a series of large-scale light projections on Silo no 5, one of Montréal's most iconic architectural structures, created in conjunction with the Montreal Museum of Contemporary Art's exhibition Leonard Cohen – A Crack in Everything. The installation featured phrases from Leonard Cohen's poems and songs, projected in both French and English for five nights only, starting on November 7, the first anniversary of Cohen's death, through November 11, 2017.

=== Permanent displays ===
- IT TAKES A WHILE BEFORE YOU CAN STEP OVER INERT BODIES AND GO AHEAD WITH WHAT YOU WERE TRYING TO DO. From The Living Series (1989), twenty-eight white granite benches with inscriptions, part of the Minneapolis Sculpture Garden
- Installation for Aachen (Selections from the Truisms and other series) (1991), Ludwig Forum für Internationale Kunst, Aachen, Germany
- Green Table (1992), a large granite picnic table with inscriptions, part of the Stuart Collection of public art on the campus of the University of California, San Diego
- Installation for Schiphol (1995), permanent installation at Amsterdam Airport Schiphol, Amsterdam, the Netherlands
- Erlauf Peace Monument (1995), outdoor installation with texts memorializing lives lost and peace gained in World War II in Erlauf, Austria
- Allentown Benches (Selections from the Truisms and Survival series) (1995), United States Courthouse, Allentown
- Installation for the Guggenheim Museum Bilbao (1997) Permanent Installation, located off the main room of the Guggenheim Bilbao, with tall LED columns of text in English (red, on the front side) and Basque (blue, on the back side)
- Oskar Maria Graf Memorial (1997), Literaturhaus, Munich
- Ceiling Snake (1997), 138 electronic LED signs with red diodes over 47.6 meters, permanently installed at the Hamburger Kunsthalle
- Bench (From the Survival Series of 8 benches) (1997), bench made of green marble at the Faulconer Gallery, Grinnell College; Portuguese inscription: NUM SONHO VOCE ENCONTROU UM JEITO DE SOBREVIVER E SE ENCHEU DE ALEGRIA. (IN A DREAM YOU SAW A WAY TO SURVIVE AND YOU WERE FULL OF JOY.)
- Truisms selections on permanent LED displays and carved into stone benches outside of Gordy Hall on the campus of Ohio University, Athens, Ohio, installed 1998
- There is a permanent LED sign along the top of the Telenor building in Oslo, Norway, installed in 2002.
- Untitled (1999), installation for Isla de Esculturas, Pontevedra, Spain
- Blacklist (1999), permanent installation composed of 10 stone benches with engraved quotes from The Hollywood Ten located in front of the University of Southern California's Fisher Museum of Art
- Historical Speeches (1999), 4-sided electronic LED sign with amber diodes, permanently installed at the Reichstag, Berlin; the piece displays a selection of speeches given in the Reichstag and Bundestag, and plays for 12 days without repeating itself
- The Black Garden of Nordhorn, the artist was commissioned to redesign a memorial to the fallen of Germany's three previous wars, including World War II. Next to the existing monolithic monument, she designed a circular garden consisting of concentric rings of plantings and pathways.
- Installation for the U.S. Courthouse and Federal Building, Sacramento (1999), a collection of statements on law, justice, and truth gathered from various sources and inscribed on 99 paving stones on the ground floor of the Robert T. Matsui United States Courthouse in Sacramento, CA.
- Wanås Wall (2002), inscriptions on stones on the grounds of Wanås Castle, Knislinge, Sweden
- Serpentine (2002), electronic LED sign with blue diodes, permanently installed at the Toray Building, Osaka
- Untitled (2002), installation at University of Agder, Gimlemoen, Norway
- 125 Years (2003), a site work at the University of Pennsylvania, celebrating 125 years of women at University of Pennsylvania
- For Pittsburgh (2005), Holzer's largest LED project in the United States boasting 688 feet of blue LED tubes attached to two edges of the roof of the David L. Lawrence Convention Center, Pittsburgh
- For Elizabeth (2006), permanent outdoor work for the Vassar College campus consisting of twenty backless and armless granite benches, inscribed with the poetry of alumna and Pulitzer Prize-winner Elizabeth Bishop
- For 7 World Trade (2006), permanent LED installation in the 65-foot-wide, 14-foot-high wall in the lobby of 7 World Trade Center
- For Novartis (2006–07), permanent LED installation at Novartis HQ, Basel, Switzerland
- For MCASD (2007), permanent LED installation on the façade of the Copley Building at Museum of Contemporary Art San Diego Downtown
- VEGAS (2009), LED installation commissioned for the parking lot of Aria Resort & Casino, Las Vegas
- Bench (2011), marble bench at Barnard College.
- 715 Molecules (2011), commissioned installation at Williams College consisting of a 16 ½ -foot long and 4-foot wide stone table and four benches, the surfaces of which have been sandblasted with 715 unique molecules
- New York City AIDS Memorial (2016), granite pavers with lines from Walt Whitman's "Song of Myself"
- For Philadelphia (2018), permanent installation at the Comcast Technology Center, Philadelphia, PA

=== Mixed media screen prints ===
At the Massachusetts Museum of Contemporary Art in 2007, Holzer presented a series of mixed media silk-screen prints; each of the 15 same-size, medium-large canvases, stained purple or brown, bears an all-black, silk-screened reproduction of a PowerPoint diagram used in 2002 to brief President Bush, Donald Rumsfeld and others on the United States Central Command's plan for invading Iraq. Holzer found these documents at the Web site of the independent, nongovernmental National Security Archive (nsarchive.org), which obtained them through the Freedom of Information Act, and has used them as source material for her work since 2004. Other paintings depict confessions or letters from prisoners of all kinds and their families (parents pleading that the Army discharge rather than court-martial their sons); autopsy and interrogation reports; or exchanges concerning torture, as well as prisoners' handprints and maps of Baghdad. The censor's marks are unmodified and the large sections of obscured text leave only sentence fragments or single words, echoes of the original content. Holzer concentrates on documents that have been partially or almost completely redacted with censor's marks.

Based on a declassified report on US special forces' activity at a base in Gardez, Afghanistan, a 2014 series of paintings explores the story of Jamal Nasser, an 18-year-old Afghan soldier who died in US military custody.

=== Dance ===
Holzer's first dance project was in 1985, "Holzer Duet ... Truisms" with Bill T. Jones. In 2010, she collaborated with choreographer Miguel Gutierrez for the Co-Lab series at the Institute of Contemporary Art, Boston. There were 10 dancers who performed in a room in which Holzer's words were projected along the walls.

=== Helmut Lang collaboration ===
Holzer first collaborated with fashion designer Helmut Lang at the 1996 Florence Biennale, where Holzer projected her text work Arno and Lang created an accompanying scent for the pavilion, evoking human presence through notes such as freshly ironed shirts and nighttime cigarette smoke. From 1997, Holzer's work was displayed in Lang's flagship stores. For the 2000 launch of Lang's first fragrance, Holzer's texts were used in an advertising campaign art-directed by Marc Atlan.

=== Publications by Holzer ===
- A Little Knowledge (1979)
- Black Book (1980)
- Hotel (with Peter Nadin, 1980)
- Living (with Nadin, 1980)
- Eating Friends (with Nadin, 1981)
- Eating Through Living (with Nadin, 1981)
- Truisms and Essays (1983)
- The Venice Installation (1990)
- Die Macht des Wortes = (2006)

== Exhibitions ==
Solo exhibitions of Holzer's work have been held in institutions such as the Fondation Beyeler in Riehen/Basel and the Whitney Museum of American Art, New York (2009), and the Museum of Contemporary Art, Chicago (2008). Other solo shows include Institute of Contemporary Arts, London (1988); Dia Art Foundation, New York (1989); Guggenheim Museum, New York (1989); Walker Art Center, Minneapolis (1991); Hamburger Kunsthalle, Hamburg (2000); Neue Nationalgalerie, Berlin (2001, 2011); Barbican Art Gallery, London (2006); BALTIC Centre for Contemporary Art, Gateshead (2010), and DHC/ART Foundation for Contemporary Art (2010). She has also participated in Documenta 8, Kassel (1987), as well as in group exhibitions in major institutions such as the Stedelijk Museum, Den Bosch, The Netherlands, the National Gallery of Canada, Ottawa, and the Museum of Modern Art, New York. Holzer will participate in the 9th Gwangju Biennale (2012). According to the website for the 2015 'Dismaland' art installation led by Banksy, Holzer contributed works to the project.

At the 1990 Venice Biennale, Holzer presented an installation that combined LED signs, engraved stone benches, and texts carved into marble. The work used multilingual electronic messages to highlight the overwhelming presence of information in contemporary public life.

Holzer had several solo exhibitions in the past several years. In 2014 her work was in Jenny Holzer: Projecto Parede at the Museu de Arte Moderna (MAM) of São Paulo in Brazil in 2014 as well as Jenny Holzer: Dust Paintings at Cheim & Read in Chelsea, New York which exemplified her use of government documents as a source for her work. In 2015 she was in Jenny Holzer: Softer Targets at the Hauser & Wirth, Somerset in Bruton, UK which featured new work and other pieces from the past three decades. Also in 2015 she had a solo exhibition at the Barbara Krakow Gallery in Boston, Massachusetts as well as War Paintings at Museo Correr in Venice, Italy. Then in the winter of 2016–17 at Alden Projects in New York, Holzer had the solo exhibition REJOICE! OUR TIMES ARE INTOLERABLE: Jenny Holzer's Street Posters, 1977–1982, which showed her language-based posters that were pasted on the streets of New York.

Jenny Holzer and Christian Lemmerz: Lust was an exhibition on view from February 2017 to May 2017 at the Randers Kunstmuseum in Randers, Denmark. Holzer was also featured in the exhibition Woman Now at the Workhouse Arts Center in Lorton, Virginia, on view from January 2017 to April 2017; her work was shown alongside Andy Warhol and Joseph Beuys, among others, in the exhibition Creature at The Broad in Los Angeles California from November 2016 to March 2017. In February 2017 she was also in the Palm Springs Popup exhibition at Ikon, Ltd., in Santa Monica alongside artists such as Richard Prince, Ellsworth Kelly, and Bruce Nauman. From January 2017 through February 2017 she was in the Fischl, Holzer, Prince, Salle, Sherman exhibition at the Skarstedt Gallery in Chelsea, New York. Also, in the summer of 2016, Holzer was included in THE EIGHTIES: A Decade of Extremes exhibition at the Museum of Contemporary Art Antwerp in Belgium which explored the New York art scene in the eighties. In 2018, Holzer had the exhibition Artist Rooms: Jenny Holzer at Tate Modern in London. She has the entire second floor of Guggenheim Museum Bilbao (nine galleries) from March 22 to September 9, 2019, for "Zera deskribaezina" (It is irreversible).

Holzer is one of six artist-curators who made selections for Artistic License: Six Takes on the Guggenheim Collection, on view at the Solomon R. Guggenheim Museum from May 24, 2019, through January 12, 2020.

Jenny Holzer: Light Line was on view at the Solomon R. Guggenheim Museum from May 17 to September 29, 2024.

== Recognition ==
In addition to winning a Golden Lion for her work at the 44th Venice Biennale in 1990, Holzer has received several other prestigious awards, including the Art Institute of Chicago's Blair Award (1982), the Skowhegan Medal for Installation (1994), the World Economic Forum's Crystal Award (1996), the Berlin Prize fellowship (2000), the ranks of chevalier (2002) and officier (2016) in France's Ordre des Arts et des Lettres, the Barnard Medal of Distinction (2011), the U.S. State Department's International Medal of Arts (2017), and a place on Time magazine's Time 100 list (2024).

In 2010, Holzer received the Distinguished Women in the Arts Award from the Museum of Contemporary Art, Los Angeles (MOCA). The annual award – recognizing women for their leadership and innovation in the visual arts, dance, music, and literature – is a bronze plaque originally designed by the artist in 1994, featuring one of her Truisms: "It is in your self-interest to find a way to be very tender."

Holzer also holds honorary degrees from Williams College, the Rhode Island School of Design, The New School, and Smith College. In 2018 she was selected as a new member of the American Academy of Arts and Letters.

In 2026, Holzer was awarded the Praemium Imperiale in the category Painting.

== Personal life ==
In the early 1980s Holzer bought a farm in Hoosick, New York, and began dividing her time between there and a loft on Eldridge Street in Manhattan. She sold the loft in the late 1990s but still maintains a studio in Brooklyn. Her private art collection includes works by Alice Neel, Kiki Smith, Nancy Spero, and Louise Bourgeois.

In a 2021 interview with Literary Hub, Holzer said that she "[has] a repressed spirituality", and stated, "I am not religious in any conventional sense, but I am all for applying appropriate feeling that might make for sanity and better behavior." When asked if she considers herself to be a political artist, Holzer stated:

I'm an artist, and a person who is political; I make some separation here. I do not represent that art is as straightforward and immediately effective as voting or doing community work, and I don't think art always can or should be pragmatic and utilitarian. At times, however, art can fuse a dreadful or wonderful reality with dreadful or wonderful representation so that people realize and feel what is, and then act.

Ahead of the 2024 United States presidential election, Holzer was one of 165 leading contemporary artists who contributed pieces to Artists for Kamala, an online sale with all proceeds raised going directly to Kamala Harris' campaign.

== See also ==
- Art & Language
- Barbara Kruger
- Martin Firrell
- Vectors Journal of Culture and Technology in a Dynamic Vernacular
- Sprüth Magers Berlin London
- Robert Montgomery
