= 125 Years =

- Artist: Jenny Holzer
- Year: 2003
- Type: Granite
- Location: Philadelphia; 39.9536170°N 75.1906470°W
- Owner: University of Pennsylvania

125 Years is a public art installation at the University of Pennsylvania, made by Jenny Holzer in 2003.

== Installation ==
This artwork is located at Hill Square, University of Pennsylvania, between Chestnut Street, Walnut Street, 33rd Street and 34th Street.

The artwork celebrates the 125-year history of women at the University of Pennsylvania. The anniversary celebration of that achievement began on November 7, 2003.

== See also ==
- List of public art in Philadelphia
