= Truisms (Jenny Holzer) =

20th-century collection of aphorisms

Truisms is a text-based art piece developed between 1978 and 1987 by the American artist Jenny Holzer. As the title suggests, the work features hundreds of truisms showcasing a wide range of opinions and beliefs. Since its release, various featured truisms have been rewritten on a variety of mediums, such as park benches, baseball caps, and t-shirts.

== Conception and execution ==
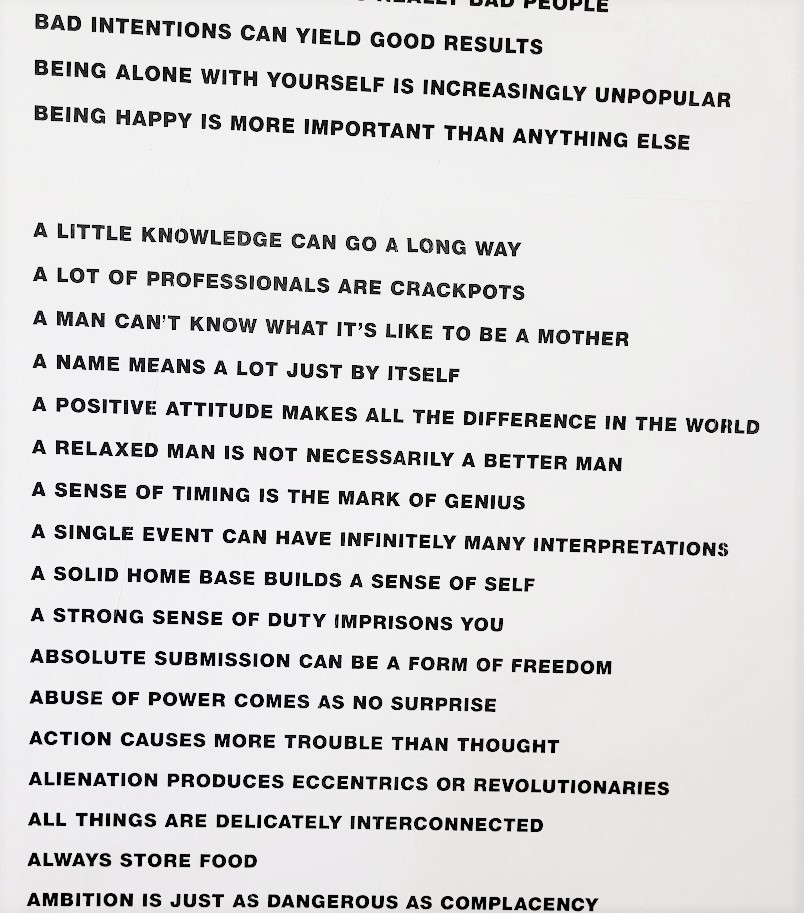
Some of Jenny Holzer's Truisms

Holzer started investigating the use of words and language as an art medium in itself while she was studying literature and philosophy in New York City in 1977. She began simplifying big ideas from her readings into concise statements and phrases and putting up signs around Manhattan. As opposed to contemporaries like Barbara Kruger, Louise Lawler, or Richard Prince, Holzer considered the text the image in itself, whereas they combined text with imagery. She appreciated the immediacy and the reaching of wide-scale audiences that signage provided. Holzer placed the finished products in telephone booths or on the walls of buildings, eventually shifting to bigger projects, like her installations in Times Square. She claimed that she wrote all her own clichés, thinking that if people heard something that was a little different than usual that they would remember it more clearly. She liked to keep her statements as short and concise as possible, so as to reach the largest crowd possible. “You only have a few seconds to catch people, so you can’t do long, reasoned arguments, [but] I hope they’re not simplistic or idiotic”, Holzer said on the topic. Her goal was for people to see them, read them, laugh at them, and be provoked by them.

== Electronic displays ==
Ned Rifkin, the chief curator for exhibitions at the Hirshhorn, calls Holzer’s work “very American” in the sense of her being at ease with technology and impatient with tradition. “I like the aggressiveness and the kind of futuristic beauty of the electronics,” Holzer said. Because of this dependence on words and electronics, her series was called “specialist art” in 1988.

== Reception ==
When Holzer displayed her Truisms, “she brought her disquieting messages to a new height of subversive social engagement.” Using mass media to exhibit her work, placing her grave texts where everyday advertising is expected, creates a new, large audience for her work: an audience of the general public who would not, under average circumstances, give modern and contemporary art a second thought. She hoped that with their prominent and public location, her Truisms would make people more aware of what she called the “usual baloney they are fed” in daily life.
