= Northern Lights Film Festival =

Independent Belarusian film festival

Northern Lights Nordic-Baltic Film Festival
- Founded: 2015
- Directors: Volia Chajkouskaya
- Website: https://www.en.northernlightsff.com/

The Northern Lights Nordic-Baltic Film Festival (Belarusian: Паўночнае ззянне) is an independent Belarusian film festival launched in 2015. The festival promotes cinema from Scandinavian and Baltic countries and serves as an industrial platform for independent filmmakers. In 2022, the festival partnered with the Tallinn Black Nights and turned into a hybrid event with online screenings available for Belarusians and on-site screenings in Estonia and Lithuania.

== Profile ==
The festival was launched in 2015 in order to promote Belarusian independent cinema outside the country, present Baltic and Scandinavian films to Belarusian audiences, and to create a platform for filmmakers to communicate and collaborate on future projects. The festival is directed and produced by Volia Chajkouskaya, the Nordic Council of Ministers Office in Lithuania is the event's main organizer. The festival is co-managed and supported by Norwegian Embassy in Kiev and Danish Cultural Institute in Lithuania, Latvia and Estonia. Annually, the festival lasts a week and offers a competition section, a retrospective program, children program “Zzya-kids” as well as 7 industrial platforms. Three competition programs are Belarusian competition, Debut and Shortcut. Northern Lights represents films from Sweden, Norway, Denmark, Finland, Iceland, Estonia, Lithuania, Latvia, Greenland. In 2015–20, Mir cinema hall in Minsk was the event's main venue, but the event expanded into other cities – Vitebsk, Tallinn, etc. In 2017, the tickets were sold out before the opening day. That year, 14 feature films were selected for the program.

In 2020 the festival went online due to COVID-19 restrictions and Mass protests in Belarus after the infamous 2020 presidential elections. In 2021, the festival went online again, this time by decision of the management team. That year, 24 feature films were selected for the competition judged by a professional jury.

Since 2022 Northern Lights has collaborated with Tallinn Black Nights. In its new form, the festival is held as a hybrid event with on-site screenings in Estonia and Lithuania and a line-up of 40 films from Belarus, Ukraine and the Nordic-Baltic region available online for Belarusians all over the world. The online screenings are free and the audience is welcomed to support the event with donations. In 2022, Ukraine mon amour section was established as a sign of support to Ukraine.

In 2023, the festival doubled its attendance in comparison to 2022. Also, the 2023 edition became the first one when the winners were given money prizes, sponsored by Current Time channel.

In 2026, a Belarusian court included the Northern Lights website in the list of extremist materials, and the Belarusian KGB declared the film festival an extremist organization.

== Winners ==
- 2021 — Papa by Maria Yakimovich;
- 2022 — The Dream, documentary by Sasha Kulak;
- 2023 — Motherland (Belarusian: Радзіма) by Alexander Mihalkovich and Hanna Badziaka.
