= Natasha Boas =

French-American writer and critic

Natasha Boas Ph.D.
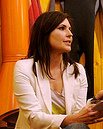
- Natasha Boas
- Born: Paris, France
- Citizenship: American and French
- Education: University of California, Berkeley; Yale University
- Occupations: Curator, writer, art critic
- Board member of: Berkeley Art Museum and Pacific Film Archive
- Awards: Mellon Fellowship for the Humanities; Luce Award; Getty Leadership Award

Natasha Boas is a French-American contemporary art curator, writer, and critic. She has taught art history and curatorial studies at Yale, Stanford, and the San Francisco Art Institute. Her exhibition on the Modernist Algerian artist, Baya Mahieddine Baya: Woman of Algiers in 2018 at the Grey Art Gallery at New York University garnered her international critical attention. In 2017 she was featured in Lynn Hershman Leeson's Vertighost, playing the role of herself as an art historian. She also authored the Facebook Artist in Residence book on the recent history of Art and Technology in the Bay Area for the 5th anniversary of Facebook's artist-in-residency program. An adjunct professor at the California College of the Arts, she is an expert in the art of California countercultures, the modernist avant-garde, surrealist women artists, the Mission School and Outsider artists.

== Early life and education ==
Boas was raised in San Francisco and Paris. As a teenager in San Francisco, Boas spent time with the robot art collective Survival Research Laboratories, and in her junior year in high school worked as an art restoration intern at the de Young Museum. She also studied art history at the Forum School in Rome for a year, and interned at the Leo Castelli Gallery in New York City.

Boas attended the Vassar College from 1982-1984 where she studied art history and graduated with a BA in comparative literature from the University of California, Berkeley in 1986. She received her MA in 1989 and Ph.D in 1996 in continental philosophy and theory at Yale, with a focus on the modernist avant-garde in art history and literature. Her dissertation, "Sublime Configurations: Breton, Bataille and the Surreal" was published in 1996 under the direction of Denis Hollier, an editor at October. While at Yale she founded the underground artist space called Basement 27.

== Career ==
Boas has been involved in exhibitions and public programs at museums and galleries internationally including the Centre Georges Pompidou, the Yerba Buena Center for the Arts, Fondation Maeght, MuCEM, Berkeley Art Museum and Pacific Film Archive, Los Angeles County Museum of Art, the Whitney Museum of American Art and San Francisco Museum of Modern Art. She teaches Thinking Through the Arts and Design at Berkeley: California Countercultures at UC Berkeley.

Boas began her career in 1990 as the gallery director at the Galerie Montenay in Paris. In 1992 she served as the visual arts curator for The American Center, working in New York and Paris. While there, she coordinated exhibitions including Off the Shelf/Off the Wall: The Artist's Book After 1960 (1996); Micromégas with Jon Kessler (1995); Leon Golub, Nancy Spero, War and Memory (1995); Stations by Bill Viola (1995) and Nam June Paik, David and Marat (1994). After leaving the American Center, she worked as a curatorial associate at the Centre Georges Pompidou, and as the curator for the Busan International Arts Festival in Busan, Korea. In 1996, Boas returned to San Francisco, and was appointed public programs curator at the Yerba Buena Center for the Arts, where she built new public programs, including panels, symposia, Internet sites, artist conversations and museum studies classes for adult audiences. Between 2001 and 2010, she curated exhibits at the Contemporary Jewish Museum, including a traveling Sophie Calle exhibition, and New Langton Arts. Boas additionally served as the curator and acting director of the San Francisco Museum of Craft and Folk Art (2007-2012), curating shows on Sister Corita Kent, Clare Rojas, and Harrell Fletcher. From 2001-2004, she was the executive director and chief curator of the Sonoma County Museum (2001-2004), where she curated the exhibit of James Turrell: Light and Land. In November 2014, she was selected to curate and organize the inaugural exhibit for Galerie Maeght's San Francisco opening.

From 2004 through 2008, Boas was a member of the founding faculty of the Graduate Program in Curatorial Practice at the California College of the Arts. In addition to developing thesis exhibition classes and program content, commissions and catalogs, she served as a thesis advisor. During 2005-2009, she wrote on art and trend-spotting for the home for Condé Nast's style magazine Domino. She was an early writer for Dwell and contributes to The Believer and The Huffington Post. And in 2017 she authored the Facebook Artist in Residence book on the recent history of Art and Tech in the Bay Area for the 5th anniversary of Facebook's artist in residency program.

=== The Mission School and Energy That Is All Around ===
Boas' interest in the Mission School was amplified while she was at the Yerba Buena Center for the Arts and the museum exhibited several of the artists associated with the movement in the 1997 show Bay Area Now: A Regional Survey of Contemporary Art. A response in part to the gentrification of the Mission District at the start of the Bay Area dot-com boom, the artists embraced street aesthetics and lowbrow visual culture. They "made and promoted graffiti; all had tagging names. All moved easily between representation and abstraction, the street and the studio, and worked in various media including painting, sculpture, drawing, collage, and installation. Although each developed a distinct artistic style and philosophy, they all were drawn to the radical and the political. Not surprisingly, all took inspiration from Bay Area Figuration, the Beats, Funk art, and Punk." Boas immersed herself in the work of the artists who would come to be known as members of the Mission School in 2002. She contributed the essay "A Partial and Incomplete Oral History of the Mission School" to the catalog for the Barry McGee exhibit at the Berkeley Art Museum; her essay was also included in the book associated with the show. In 2010, the San Francisco Museum of Modern Art stated that the Mission School was "the most significant art movement to emerge out of San Francisco in the late twentieth century".

In 2013, Boas organized and curated Energy is All Around for the San Francisco Art Institute; it was the first survey exhibition to examine the Mission School as a historical reality. Work by Chris Johanson, Margaret Kilgallen, Barry McGee, Alicia McCarthy and Ruby Neri was included in the exhibit, which consisted of 130 paintings, drawings and sculptures dating from 1990 to 2013. In a review of the show, The New York Times wrote: "(It) bristles infectiously with youthful urgency"; The Huffington Post stated: "If one ever wanted to witness how an entire movement can be inspired and evolve, this show is not to be missed." The show opened at the San Francisco Art Institute in late 2013. In April 2014, Energy Is All Around was exhibited at the Grey Gallery at New York University.

== Awards and distinctions ==
- Finalist for Stanford University Mellon Fellowship in the Humanities
- Grant, The Andy Warhol Foundation for the Visual Arts
- Ecole Normale Supérieure, Rue d'Ulm, Paris, France. Awarded DEA, Le Musée
- Clare Boothe Luce Award for outstanding work in French Literary Theory
- The Woodrow Wilson Mellon Fellowship in the Humanities

== Selected publications ==
- Boas, Natasha; et al. (2014). Energy That Is All Around: Mission School: Chris Johanson, Margaret Kilgallen, Alicia McCarthy, Barry McGee, Ruby Neri. Chronicle Books. ISBN 9781452142180.
- Alex Baker; Natasha Boas; Germano Celant; Jeffrey Deitch (2012). Lawrence Rinder; Dena Beard (eds.). Barry McGee. D.A.P./University of California, Berkeley Art Museum, and Pacific Film Archive. ISBN 9781935202851.
- Clare Rojas (2011). Everything Flowers. Natasha Boas, Foreword. Chronicle Books. ISBN 9780811871518.
- Boas, Natasha (1996). Sublime Configurations: Breton, Bataille and the Surreal. Yale University Press.
