= Paulson Fontaine Press =

Paulson Fontaine Press (formerly Paulson Bott Press) is a printmaking studio, gallery, and publisher of contemporary fine art prints in Berkeley, California. Many of their publications are etchings. More than half of their published editions have been produced with minority or female artists. In a 2011 interview, Pam Paulson stated: "We plan projects with emerging, mid-career, and blue-chip artists. We keep a balance."

== History ==
In 1993, Pam Paulson, who had previously worked at Crown Point Press, began conducting workshops in intaglio printmaking and producing editions with local artists from an 800 square-foot studio in Emeryville, California. In 1996, she and Renee Bott co-founded Paulson Press, moving to a larger studio space in Emeryville. Their first publications were Chris Brown's "Train Series" prints; these quickly sold out, providing capital for the business to begin extending invitations to artists from outside the Bay Area, starting with Radcliffe Bailey. In 1999, the press relocated to 9th Street in Berkeley, where they produced and exhibited prints by artists such as Brown and Deborah Oropallo. In 2009, they moved to their current location on 4th Street in Berkeley. In 2016, gallery director Rhea Fontaine became a partner and the press was renamed Paulson Fontaine Press. Fontaine is one of the first African-American women in history to publish fine art prints by contemporary artists.

Prints from Paulson Fontaine Press are included in the collections of the Achenbach Foundation, the Anderson Collection, the Art Institute of Chicago, the Austin Museum of Art, Bank of America, the Berkeley Art Museum, the Birmingham Museum of Art, the Chazen Museum of Art, the Cleveland Museum of Art, the Crocker Art Museum, the De Saisset Museum, the Detroit Institute of Arts, Elgin Community College, Fidelity Investments, the de Young Museum, the Hallmark Collection, the High Museum of Art, the Hirshhorn Museum and Sculpture Garden, the Houston Museum of Fine Arts, JP Morgan Chase, the Kresge Art Museum, the Library of Congress, the Los Angeles County Museum of Art, the McNay Art Museum, the Morgan Guaranty Trust Company, the Museum of Modern Art in New York, the Nancy and Joachim Bechtle Private Collection, the National Gallery of Art, the New York Public Library Schomburg Center, the Palmer Museum of Art, the Polk Museum of Art, the Progressive Corporation, the Saint Louis Art Museum, the San Jose Museum of Art, the Studio Museum in Harlem, the Baltimore Museum of Art, the Tubman African American Museum, the U.S. Department of State, the University of Michigan, the Walker Art Center, the Whitney Museum of American Art.

In 2015, the press's entire archive was acquired by the Fine Arts Museums of San Francisco; the archive, comprising nearly 500 prints by more than forty artists, is held at the Achenbach Foundation for Graphic Arts.

In 2018, the Pennsylvania Academy of the Fine Arts (PAFA) announced that it would become the sole East Coast repository for prints by African American artists from Paulson Fontaine Press.

== Gee's Bend ==
In 1999, Mary Lee and Louisiana Bendolph, quilters from Gee's Bend, Alabama, were invited to the press where they printed and published editions of color aquatints with spit bite and softground etching. The press set up sewing machines so that the Bendolphs could compose their designs as quilts. The printers then made impressions of the quilts using softground to create etching plates which were used as matrices for prints on paper. A second project included two more Gee's Bend quilters.

== "Personal to Political" Exhibition ==
In 2018, curator Carrie Lederer organized the exhibition "Personal to Political: Celebrating the African-American Artists of Paulson Fontaine Press" at Bedford Gallery in Walnut Creek. The exhibition will travel through 2022 to venues across the United States including the Krasl Art Center in St Joseph, Michigan; Gallery 360 at Northeastern University, Boston, MA; Las Cruces Museum of Art in New Mexico; the Museum of Arts and Sciences, Daytona Beach, FL; the Charles H. Wright Museum of African-American History in Detroit, Michigan; the Montgomery Museum of Fine Arts, Montgomery, AL; the Art Museum of West Virginia University in Morgantown; the Robert and Frances Fullerton Museum of Art at CSU San Bernardino, California; the Fort Wayne Museum of Art in Fort Wayne, Indiana; the DeVos Art Museum at North Michigan University; Mills College Art Museum in Oakland, California; and the Bakersfield Museum of Art in Bakersfield, California.

== Artists ==
Besides those already named, artists whose prints have been published by Paulson Fontaine Press include:

- Mari Andrews
- Edgar Arceneaux
- Tauba Auerbach
- Donald Baechler
- Chris Ballantyne
- Louisiana Bendolph
- Mary Lee Bendolph
- Loretta Bennett
- McArthur Binion
- Ross Bleckner
- James Brown
- Squeak Carnwath
- Steve Briscoe
- Enrique Martinez Celaya
- Kota Ezawa
- Caio Fonseca
- Charles Gaines
- Isca Greenfield-Sanders
- Salomon Huerta
- David Huffman
- Chris Johanson
- Samuel Levi Jones
- Maira Kalman
- Amy Kaufman
- Margaret Kilgallen
- Hung Liu
- Kerry James Marshall
- Alicia McCarthy
- Keegan McHargue
- Shaun O'Dell
- Loretta Pettway
- Martin Puryear
- Clare Rojas
- Gary Simmons
- Lava Thomas
- Robert Yoder
