= Griff Williams (painter) =

American gallerist, painter (born 1966)

- Born: January 23, 1966 (age 60); Butte, Montana, U.S.
- Education: University of Montana (BFA); San Francisco Art Institute (MFA)
- Parents: Pat Williams (father); Carol Williams (mother)
- Relatives: Whitney Williams (sister)

Griff Williams (born January 23, 1966), is an American painter, publisher, art instructor, filmmaker, and gallerist. He owned Gallery 16 art gallery (1993–2025). His paintings have been exhibited in galleries and museums worldwide.

== Early life, family, and education ==
Griff Williams was born on January 23, 1966, in Butte, Montana. His father, Pat Williams, was Montana's longest serving U.S. Congressman and was recognized by the New York Times as a "champion of wilderness protection, federal arts funding, and family-friendly social policies." His mother, Carol Williams, served as the first female majority leader in the Montana Senate. His sister is businesswoman and, philanthropist Whitney Williams.

Williams received a BFA degree from the University of Montana, Missoula in 1984; and a MFA degree from the San Francisco Art Institute in 1993.

== Career ==
In 1993, Williams founded Gallery 16 and Urban Digital Color in San Francisco, California. For 32 years the gallery was a vibrant hub for the San Francisco arts community until it's closure in September 2025. It was planning on transitioning to a pop-up model in 2026. The gallery exhibited the works of many influential contemporary artists, including Margaret Kilgallen, bell hooks, Paul Sietsema, Arturo Herrera, Rex Ray, Michelle Grabner, Mark Grotjahn, Tucker Nichols, and Ari Marcopoulos.

Williams was an instructor at the California College of the Arts, the San Francisco Art Institute, and Mills College.

His art work has been reviewed in Art in America, Frieze, Flash Art, SFAQ, and ArtNet.

Williams is an outspoken advocate for the arts in San Francisco. And he frequently speaks publicly on arts-related issues around the United States.

He has also designed and published dozens of books with the Gallery 16 Editions imprint. His recent books include The Gay Seventies: Hal Fischer (2019), the first monograph to feature the complete collection of works Hal Fischer produced in San Francisco's Haight and Castro neighborhoods in the 1970s. Published by Chronicle Books in 2020, his book on the life and artwork of the late San Francisco artist Rex Ray includes essays by Rebecca Solnit and Christian Frock.

Williams wrote Jim Melchert: Where the Boundaries Are. Published in 2025 by Gallery 16, this is the first monograph on the influential career of Jim Melchert and includes essays by Sequoia Miller, Tanya Zimbardo, and Maria Porges. He curated a traveling retrospective with the same title (Jim Melchert: Where the Boundaries Are) that premiered at the DiRosa Center for Contemporary Art in October 2025.

== Filmmaking ==
Williams and his son, filmmaker Keelan Williams made a documentary feature film, Tell Them We Were Here (2021). The film is a documentary about eight artists living and working in the San Francisco Bay Area who are guided by a belief that creativity is a tool for societal change. The artwork of Amy Franchescini, Alicia McCarthy, Sadie Barnette, Lynn-Herhsman-Leeson, Nigel Poor, Jim Goldberg, Michael Swaine, and Tucker Nichols are featured in the film with music by Marc Cappelle, Kelley Stoltz, Tommy Guerrero, Vetiver, and Devendra Banhart. The film was selected by film festivals around the world, including DOXA Documentary Film Festival, Big Sky Documentary Film Festival, and Newport Beach Film Festival. Tell Them We Were Here was awarded Best Feature Documentary at the Nevada City Film Festival. The San Francisco Chronicle gave the film its highest possible rating and stated, "the Williamses see art not as the exclusive domain of museums, galleries and collections, but as an essential component of a healthy society — something that can make communities not just more beautiful, but more functional." The film has been screened at SFMoMA, Stanford University, and Orange County Museum of Art in California.

Willams also created short documentary films for artists including Luminous Ground: Ala Ebtekar (2024), for the Asian Art Museum and Richard Shaw.

== Publications ==
Articles and Interviews

- Williams, Griff (October 28, 2017). "Lowell Darling: In Conversation with Griff Williams". SFAQ (interview).
- Williams, Griff (January 16, 2026). "A message to S.F. Mayor Lurie: The demise of California College of the Arts is nothing to celebrate". San Francisco Chronicle.

Books

- Williams, Griff, Dean Byington, Rick Moody (2015). Dean Byington. San Francisco: Gallery 16 Editions. ISBN 0982767145
- Williams, Griff, Kevin Killian, Rene P. Barilleaux, Norma Cole (2017). Rex Ray: We Are All Made of Light. San Francisco: Gallery 16 Editions. ISBN 0982767161, 9780982767191
- Williams, Griff (2020). The Art of Rex Ray. Essays by Rebecca Solnit and Christian Frock. San Francisco: Chronicle Books. ISBN 0982767161
- Williams, Griff (2025). Jim Melchert: Where the Boundaries Are. Essays by Sequoia Miller, Tanya Zimbardo, Renny Pritikin, and Maria Porges. Oro Editions. Gallery 16. ISBN 978-0-9827671-8-4
