= Luggage Store Gallery =

Art nonprofit organization in San Francisco

- Formation: 1987; 39 years ago
- Founder: Laurie Lazer, Darryl Smith
- Headquarters: 1007 Market Street, San Francisco, California, U.S.
- Location(s): 509 Ellis Street, San Francisco, California U.S.
- Coordinates: 37.782499°N 122.410237°W

The Luggage Store Gallery, also known as 509 Cultural Center, is a non-profit, multi-disciplinary arts organization founded in 1987, and has two venues located in the Tenderloin neighborhood of San Francisco, California. The organization has sponsored many local artists, including those that are considered to be part of the Mission School, and of skateboard or street art culture.

== History ==
The Luggage Store Gallery was founded by Darryl Smith and Laurie Lazer, and they serve as co-directors. The 509 Cultural Center at 509 Ellis Street began in 1987 as an arts collective of 17 members many of which were connected to the Aarti Cooperative Hotel at 391 Leavenworth Street. Artist Carlos Villa (1936–2013) had served as a mentor to Lazer and Smith, and then later as a board member.

Since June 1991, the organization has a second venue in a second floor walk-up at 1007 Market Street in the Tenderloin, The Luggage Stre, aka the "509 Cultural Annex". The original location is at 509 Ellis Street, which is sometimes referred to as the "509 Cultural Center". In 2013, the 509 Ellis location became the Swim Gallery, directed by artist Yarrow Slaps and Auguste Somers. Swim Gallery showcases and promotes the work primarily of young, emerging artists, many of whom identify as BIPOC and from the LGBTQA commumnity.

The 5w09 Cultural Center (legal non profit name)'s mission iorganizational mission is to build community through organizing multidisciplinary arts programming accessible and reflective of local residents. Their programs are designed to broaden social and aesthetic networks, and to encourage the flow of images and ideas between the diverse cultural communities that cross paths in their exceptionally dynamic downtown San Francisco neighborhood. To implement their mission, they organize exhibitions, performing arts events, arts education and public art programs designed to amplify the voices of the region’s diverse artists and residents, to promote inclusion and respect, to reduce inter-group tensions and to work towards dispelling the stereotypes and fears that continue to separate all of us.

The gallery has also served as a community meeting space. The organization has supported Michael Swaine's project, the San Francisco Free Mending Library, "Sewing for the People" in the Tenderloin National Forest, where he would repair and mend the clothes of local residents and homeless.

The organization co founded with Wise Fool Puppet Intervention and hosted The Annual Free In the Street Street Theater Festival for 11 years in the Tenderloin, that took place in the 500 block of Ellis and Cohen Alley, aka Tenderloin national Forest bringing hundreds of free, interactive, experimental and innovative performances to the street.

== About ==
The organization operates as an art gallery, an event venue, and performance space; as well as a host of public art and arts educations programs, help support the creation of public art (primarily murals), and host public programs. The Luggage Store Gallery runs the "Tenderloin National Forest" (also known as Cohen Alley), a community space, garden, and beautification project which started in 1989. The Luggage Store Gallery has hosted a program called "Short Cuts", for emerging artists and curators.

== Visual arts ==
In 1994, Barry McGee painted a mural on a garage door at 1009 Market Street, which was accidentally painted over by a person working for a "neighborhood improvement group". In September 1999, a 64-foot-long, 8-foot-high mural made up of 300 pieces, made by Barry McGee and financially sponsored by the Luggage Store Gallery and the Creative Work Fund, was stolen off a vacant commercial building in San Francisco.

In spring 2003, Os Gemeos held their first solo exhibition in the United States at The Luggage Store; and they produced a 25-foot by 15-foot mural on the side of the Luggage Store Gallery building, "Pavil" on Market Street.

In 2010, the gallery hosted Carlos Villa's seminal group exhibition, Rehistoricizing The Time Around Abstract Expressionism, to promote and publicize formerly overlooked art contributions by women and artists of color.

== Notable artists ==
- Joe Amrhein
- Tauba Auerbach
- Lenore Chinn
- Neck Face
- Erlin Geffrard
- Os Gemeos
- Taraneh Hemami
- Xylor Jane
- Chris Johanson
- Margaret Kilgallen
- Nguyen Phuong Linh
- Alicia McCarthy
- Barry McGee
- Ruby Neri
- Chris Powell
- Stephen Powers (artist)
- Clare Rojas
- Rigo 23
- Tavares Strachan
- Michael Stutz
- Swoon and Monica Canilao
- Cate White
- Katie Vida
