= David Yurman =

Luxury jeweler

David Yurman, Inc.
- Type: Private
- Industry: Jewelers
- Founded: 1980
- Headquarters: New York City, U.S.
- Key people: David Yurman, Co-Founder/CEO; Sybil Yurman, Co-Founder
- Products: Jewelry
- Website: davidyurman.com

David Yurman is a privately held American jewelry company, founded by David Yurman (born October 12, 1942 in New York City) and Sybil Kleinrock Yurman (born December 10, 1942 in New York City). It is headquartered in New York City.

== History ==
=== Early years ===
David Yurman grew up in the Bronx, one of New York City's five boroughs. He came from a Jewish family and would later describe himself as a "terrible student." At age 15, he met Cuban welder and sculptor Ernesto Gonzalez, who taught him welding techniques. After a year at New York University, Yurman left college and spent the next five years hitchhiking between New York's Greenwich Village and California, specifically Venice and Big Sur, partaking in the Beatnik and San Francisco Renaissance cultural movements. In the early 1960s, he apprenticed for several years with modernist sculptor Jacques Lipchitz. He also established his own studio in Greenwich Village. There, he worked with various sculptors, including Theodore Roszak and Edward Meshekoff, doing large-scale public works. For Lincoln Center, Yurman helped create the railings of the promenade in what is now called the David H. Koch Theater, designed by Phillip Johnson. He also worked on the eagle sculpture commissioned for the James L. Watson Court of International Trade in New York City. In the late 1960s, Yurman became the shop foreman for sculptor Hans Van de Bovenkamp. In that studio, he met painter Sybil Kleinrock, his future wife and business partner.

=== Transition to jewelry ===
In the early 1970s, Yurman and Kleinrock moved to Carmel in upstate New York. They formed a company called Putnam Art Works, which specialized in sculptural jewellery. Throughout the next decade they exhibited their jewellery designs, sculptures, and paintings at various galleries and craft fairs. They became key figures in the American craft movement. Through Putnam Art Works, the Yurmans learned about the marketplace for fine crafts and artisanal jewellery. They married in 1979 and founded the David Yurman company a year later, with Sybil Yurman acting as a co-creator and collaborator in all facets of the business. Their son, Evan Yurman, was born on January 31, 1982.

In 1977, Yurman was chosen as one of 12 jewellers to exhibit at the first New Designer Gallery at the Retail Jewelers of America Show (RJA) in New York City. This exhibition provides a pivotal connection between traditional artisans and established merchandisers. During the 1980s and 1990s, the David Yurman company was at the forefront of the emerging category of American designer jewellery.

In 1999, David and Sybil Yurman opened their first store in New York.

In 2000, the couple collaborated with the David Lipman advertising agency and photographer Peter Lindbergh for their first advertising campaign. It was shot in St. Barts in France with Amber Valletta as the face of the brand. In 2003, Evan Yurman joined the company, and in 2004 he became the design director of the Men's and Timepiece Collections. In 2009, he launched an exclusive collection of high-end jewellery and began overseeing the company's Wedding Collection, which debuted in 2006.

In 2017, Rizzoli published David Yurman Cable, the brand's first book. The monograph explores cable as an archetypal form and Yurman's artistic use of it as his signature through essays by Paul Greenhalgh, William Norwich, and Carine Roitfeld, and a foreword by Sybil and David Yurman.

Brand ambassadors include actor, director, producer, Golden Globe and Oscar Nominee Michael B. Jordan, singer Shawn Mendes, model, actor Hero Fiennes Tiffin, model, actress Iris Law, and actress Eiza González, who was announced in February 2025 which reflects the brand's appeal to diverse audiences and other people.

== Judgment against counterfeiters ==
In March 2019, the United States District Court for the Southern District of New York entered a default judgment in favor of David Yurman, awarding the company $1,550,000 and a permanent injunction against 31 defendants. The defendants operated a network of websites infringing on the company's trademarks, selling counterfeit David Yurman goods.

== Honors and awards ==
- 1981: Designer of the Year by the Cultured Pearl Associations of America and Japan
- 2013: Annual Visionaries! Award from the Museum of Arts and Design

== Commitments ==
The David & Sybil Yurman Humanitarian and Arts Foundation was established in 2001 to award individuals who support charities and the arts through their donations and volunteerism. Past recipients include Steven Spielberg, Elton John, and Leonard Slatkin.

The foundation also provides support for a variety of charitable initiatives, including The Whitney Museum of American Art, Studio In a School, The Breast Cancer Research Foundation, and the Make-A-Wish Foundation.

David Yurman also created a pin for the Silver Shield Foundation supporting the families of New York City firefighters and policemen.

David Yurman supports several charitable equestrian initiatives as well including Gallop NYC therapeutic horsemanship and the Gleneayre Equestrian Foundation.

In 2025, Jewelers of America and the Gem Awards committee announced the launch of the David Yurman Gem Awards Grant, a $50,000 grant and mentorship program created specifically for emerging jewelry designers.
