= New Image Art =

Coordinates: 34.090617°N 118.362210°W

New Image Art is a contemporary art gallery in West Hollywood, California. Founded in 1994 by curator Marsea Goldberg, the gallery is known for championing street art, outsider art, and emerging contemporary practices, and has exhibited both international and Los Angeles–based artists.

== History ==
New Image Art was established in 1994 by Marsea Goldberg in West Hollywood. Since its inception, it has been recognized as an artist-run space supporting artists outside traditional fine-art institutions. Its role within the Los Angeles scene was noted in a 2006 Los Angeles Times survey of “Movement” galleries, which cited New Image Art among core venues.

== Exhibitions ==
In February 2008, the gallery hosted Swoon's immersive solo installation Drown Your Boats, which transformed the space with a canoe, skeletal mermaids, layered city imagery, and found-object collage.

In 2011, Los Angeles Times critic Mindy Farabee described Annie Vought's solo show as “manual feats, optical wonders, conceptual and emotional provocations,” praising her cut-paper reinterpretations of text messages.

In 2015, the gallery presented Patrick Martinez: Forbidden Fruit, the artist's first solo with the gallery, covered in local and art-press outlets. The anniversary survey 15 Years of New Image Art (2009) appears in the gallery's exhibition archive.

In 2016, Los Angeles Times reviewed the collaborative duo LAND (Caleb Owen Everitt and Ryan Rhodes) at New Image Art, noting the work's “pictographic punch.”

== Artists ==
The gallery has exhibited work by both established and emerging artists, including:

- Shepard Fairey
- Barry McGee
- Ed Templeton
- Chris Johanson
- Tauba Auerbach
- Rich Jacobs
- Neck Face
- Cleon Peterson
- Jeff Soto
- Megan Whitmarsh
- Faile
- Judith Supine
- Manuel Lopez
- Retna
- Swoon
- The Date Farmers
- Bäst
- Patrick Martinez
- Carlos Ramirez
