= Richard Jacobs =

Richard Jacobs may refer to:

- Richard E. Jacobs (1925–2009), co-founder of The Richard E. Jacobs Group; former owner of the Cleveland Indians
- Richard Jacobs (rabbi) (born 1956), U.S. Reform rabbi
- Dick Jacobs (1918–1988), American musician
- Rich Jacobs (1972-2025), American artist and curator
- Rick Jacobs, founder and chair of the Courage Campaign

== See also ==
- Richard Jacob (disambiguation)
