= Erlin Geffrard =

US multi-media visual artist and musician

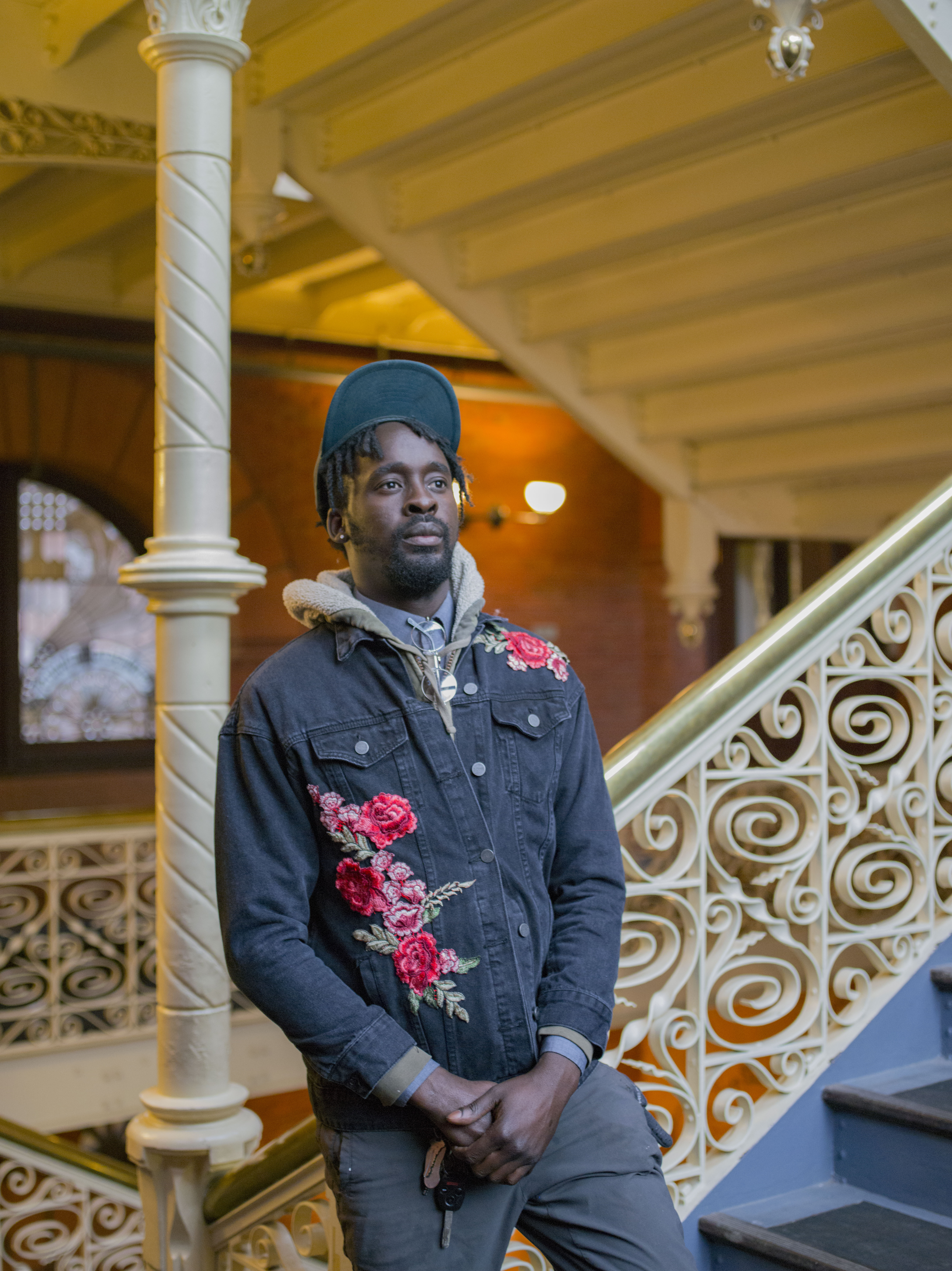
- Born: 1987 (age 38–39); Palm Beach, Florida, U.S.
- Known for: Visual Arts

Erlin Adones Geffrard (born November 14, 1987) is an American multimedia visual artist, and musician. He is based in Philadelphia, Pennsylvania.

== Early life and education ==
Geffrard is originally from Palm Beach, Florida, and of Haitian descent. He studied painting and design at San Francisco Art Institute; before earning an M.F.A. degree at the University of Pennsylvania.

He currently teaches at the University of Pennsylvania.

== Work ==
Primarily an installation artist and activating his pieces through participation by the visitor and sound, Geffrard originally worked under the alias, Kreyola Kid, as a performance artist. He was influenced by the idea of "refugee" running throughout his work and life; his Haitian origin and family, upbringing in Florida and the underground culture in the Bay Area. His work concerns the overlap of fine arts, commercial hip hop culture, and issues of class, race, place, gender, and religion through subject matter and material.

== Exhibitions and collections ==
As part of Philadelphia Contemporary's 2018 Festival for the People, Geffrard created banners, reminiscent of Haitian vodou flags, that were each dedicated to a different neighborhood in Philly. The exhibition also included works by artists Michel Auder, Mel Chin and Rikrit Tiravanija.

His work has been exhibited in the Luggage Store Gallery, the American Academy in Rome, the David Nolan Gallery, Humboldt State University, and New Image Art and it is part of the Petrucci Family Foundation Collection.
