= Neck Face =

American graffiti artist

- Born: 1984 (age 41–42); Stockton, California, U.S.
- Style: Naïve
- Movement: Graffiti

Tag
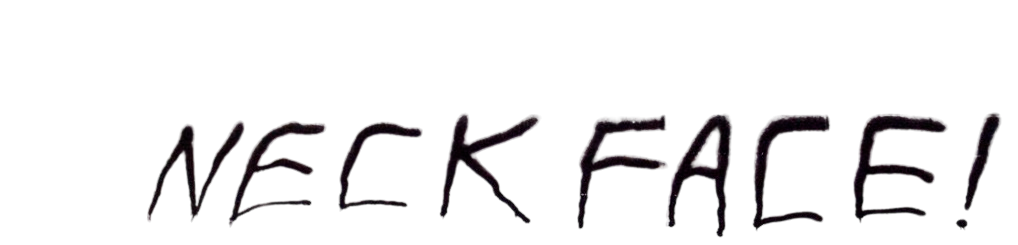

Neck Face (born 1984 in Stockton, California) is a graffiti artist known for a naïve and humorous style. His works have been shown in art galleries as well as on the streets.

== Early life and education ==
Neck Face grew up in a large family and two of his brothers ran a graffiti shop where he spent a lot of time. He began tagging in Stockton, California during his junior year in high school. He went to The School of Visual Arts in New York City, but said "I went to art school for two years and realized that it sucked... and dropped out"

== Work ==
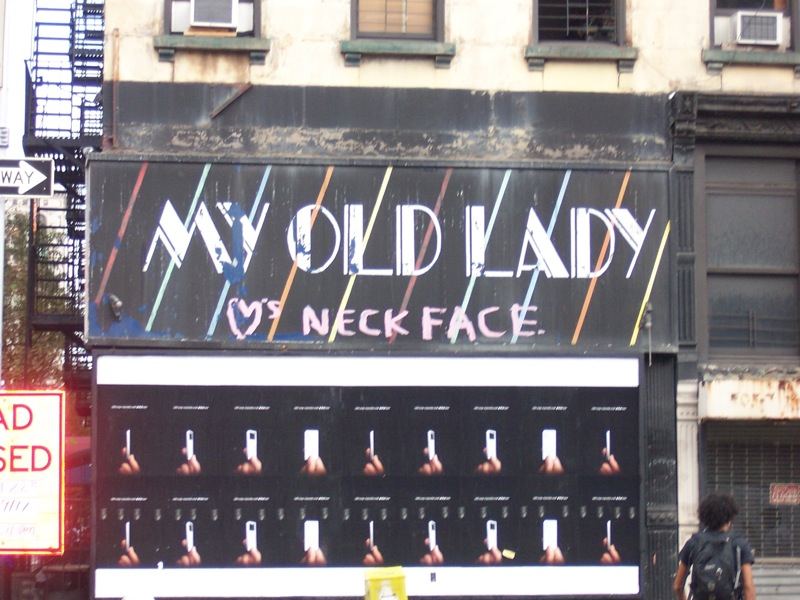
Neck Face tag on My Old Lady storefront

Neck Face's style can be described as naïve and scratchy. His themes have a bloody, violent and medieval feel to them. Obvious influences are heavy metal and latrinalia. His gallery works stay true to his style, and include drawings and paintings, as well as metal masks, felt installations, and sculptures.

In 2005, his work was prominently visible from the Brooklyn-Queens Expressway. He has painted throughout the United States, and in Melbourne, Sydney, Copenhagen, and Tokyo.

== Career ==
He started around 1996 by making stickers and putting them up in Stockton and Lodi, California. Then his work spread to San Francisco. The attention he received from his street work allowed him to move into art galleries. Neck Face's first gallery show was in 2004 when he was 18 years old, sponsored by Rich Jacobs and held at New Image Art gallery in West Hollywood, California. He's shown in the New Image Art Gallery in Los Angeles, the Luggage Store Gallery in San Francisco, One Grand Gallery in Portland, the Dactyl Foundation in New York, and the OHWOW Gallery in Miami.

=== Commercial projects ===
As a skateboarder, Neck Face has helped design for Baker Skateboards, and is the Art Director for Baker Skateboards. Neck Face has also collaborated with Vans, Stüssy and Altamont Apparel. His first skateboard art was for famous skateboarder Mark Gonzales. The then 18-year-old Neck Face was asked to provide a design for the Krooked board. After his first board with Gonzales he was introduced to Kevin 'Spanky' Long and started to create boards for him and the Baker skateboard brand.

== Solo exhibitions ==
- 2012 Neck Face "A Deal with the Devil", One Grand Gallery in Portland, OR
- 2012 Neck Face "Simply the Worst", New Image Art Gallery in Los Angeles, CA
- 2010 Neck Face Into Darkness, OHWOW Los Angeles
- 2009 Neck Face "Return to the Womb," V1 Gallery in Copenhagen, Denmark
- 2009 Neck Face at OHWOW, Miami, Florida in October
- 2007 Closed casket, Dactyl Foundation, New York, USA
- 2006 The Night After Halloween, New Image Art Gallery, West Hollywood, USA
- 2005 Monster Children, Sydney, Australia
- 2005 DPMHI, London, U.K.
- 2004 Witch Hunt, New Image Art Gallery, West Hollywood, USA

== Bibliography ==
- Neck Face (2004). Neck Face: Satan's Bride!!!. KAWS.
- Neck Face (2010). Neck Face: The Devil Made Me Do It!!!. OHWOW.- Total pages: 156

== See also ==
- Subvertising
- Transgressive art
