= Sahar Khoury =

American visual artist (born 1973)

- Born: 1973 (age 52–53); Chicago, Illinois, United States
- Education: University of California, Santa Cruz (BA), University of California, Berkeley (MFA)
- Occupations: Visual artist, sculptor
- Partner: Alicia McCarthy
- Awards: SECA Art Award (2019)

Sahar Khoury (born 1973) is an American artist and sculptor. She won the 2019 SECA Art Award and has had work exhibited in multiple institutions such as the Luggage Store Gallery, Wexner Center for the Arts, Yerba Buena Center for the Arts, and the Fine Arts Museums of San Francisco.

== Early life and family ==
In 1973, Khoury was born in Chicago. Her mother is Iranian, and her father is Jordanian-Palestinian; both of her parents had fled their homeland.

Khoury's partner is painter Alicia McCarthy.

== Education and career ==
In 1996, Khoury graduated with a Bachelor of Arts in anthropology from the University of California, Santa Cruz. After graduating with her bachelors, Khoury attended printmaking classes at the Mission Cultural Center for Latino Arts and studied screen printing and monotypes under artist Michael Roman. In addition to screen printing and monotypes, Khoury uses several mediums throughout her work, including ceramic, papier-mâché, textiles, and cement. She graduated from University of California, Berkeley in 2013 with a Master of Fine Art. Khoury would later become a lecturer at University of California, Berkeley.

In February 2017, Khoury had a solo exhibition called THEY at the Luggage Store Gallery. In 2018, her work was featured in the Yerba Buena Center for the Arts’ triennial “Bay Area Now” exhibit alongside Taravat Talepasand, Woody De Othello, and others. In 2019, Khoury was awarded the SECA Art Award alongside Kenyatta A.C. Hinkle and Marlon Mullen. In that same year, her work was exhibited alongside Julia Goodman and Krista Franklin at the Salina Art Center in Salina, Kansas. She also participated alongside Tannaz Farsi, Minoosh Zomorodinia, and others in an exhibit at the San Francisco Arts Commission Galleries titled “Part and Parcel” that same year.

In 2021, Khoury held residence at the Headlands Center for the Arts in Sausalito, California. Khoury was commissioned by the Wexner Center for the Arts to create several sculptures that culminated in her 2023 exhibit Umm, which was also shown at that Wexner Center for the Arts. Also in 2023, Khoury's work, alongside 29 other artists' work, were acquired by the Fine Arts Museums of San Francisco through a $1 million donation from the Svane Family Foundation.

Khoury has also sculpted several pieces using her dog Esther as inspiration.
