= Anders Ruhwald =

Danish-American Sculptor

- Born: 1974 (age 51–52); Randers, Denmark
- Citizenship: United States
- Occupation: Sculptor
- Years active: 1995-present
- Website: www.andersruhwald.com

Anders Herwald Ruhwald is a Danish-American sculptor. He works primarily in clay, a medium he has been drawn to since he was 15. Ruhwald's work blends references from functional objects to classical sculpture and can take the form of singular objects as well as immersive installations In 2024 he was awarded a fellowshipin Fine Arts from The John Simon Guggenheim Memorial Foundation.

== Early life and education ==
Ruhwald completed his BFA at the Royal Danish Academy in Bornholm, Denmark in 2000. While there, he apprenticed for artist Jun Kaneko, whose work had a lasting influence on his practice. Ruhwald finished his MA at Royal College of Art in London in 2005, studying under Martin Smith, Allison Britton and Emmanuel Cooper.

== Career ==
Central to Ruhwald's work is the idea that "the messy practicality of objects is something to be embraced and not occluded" and his work can be understood as an amalgamation of both art and design without giving regard to the hierarchies normally assigned to these. Instead, Ruhwald's work implies that "subjectivity arises in the perception of differences, one that is both durational and spatially determined". Ruhwald's work is rooted "the 20th century Scandinavian tradition of the Formgiver in which the artisan compensates for modernity and our enigmatic dissatisfaction with it". His work is often highly crafted and a large part of his practice is dedicated to material experimentation and surface development, and as a result Glenn Adamson has noted that "for all their compressed particularity, [his] sculptures are also enlivened by inexhaustible nuance. Ruhwald takes seriously the idea that surface is where form interfaces with spatial context, so his surfaces have an intensity in all registers".

Solo presentations of Ruhwald's work have been mounted at Indianapolis Museum of Art; Casa Museo Jorn, Italy; MOCA Cleveland; Kunstner Forbundet, Norway; The Saarinen House, Cranbrook Art Museum, Middlesbrough Institute of Modern Art, UK. In 2019, he completed the permanent installation Unit 1: 3583 Dubois St in Detroit, supported by the Knight Foundation, The Graham Foundation, The Gilbert Family Foundation, and the Danish Art Foundation.

In 2011, Ruhwald won the Gold Prize at the Gyeonggi International Ceramics Biennial in South Korea, and he was awarded the Sotheby's Prize at the Victoria and Albert Museum in London in 2007.

His works is the included collections of Victoria & Albert Museum, London; The Art Institute of Chicago, US; Philadelphia Museum of Art, US; Detroit Institute of Art, US; Indianapolis Museum of Art, US; The Denver Art Museum, US; The British Crafts Council; Nasjonal Museet, Oslo, Norway; Musee de Arts Decoratifs, Paris; Nationalmuseum, Stockholm, Sweden; Sørlandets Kunstmuseum, Norway; Icheon World Ceramic Center, South Korea; Röhsska Museum, Sweden; Musée Magnelli, Vallauris, France; Design Museum, Copenhagen, Denmark; Clay Museum, Denmark; and Design Museum, Helsinki, Finland.

Ruhwald is also a teacher and has taught sculpture and ceramics in North America and Europe. He was an assistant professor at NSCAD in Halifax, Canada in 2005/06, CU Boulder in Colorado in 2007, An associate professor at The School of the Art Institute of Chicago in 2007/08 and the Artist in Residence and Head of Ceramics at Cranbrook Academy of Art from 2008 until he resigned in 2017. From 2018 to 2022, he was a visiting professor at The National Academy of Art in Norway.

=== Notable exhibitions ===
- Century Garden, Indianapolis Museum of Art, Indianapolis, IN 2020
- The Hand is the Mind is the Bomb that Blows, Harbourfront Centre, Toronto, Canada, 2018
- Unit 1: 3583 Dubois, Museum of Contemporary Art Cleveland, Cleveland, OH, 2016
- One thing follows the other (and you make it happen), The David Ousley Museum of Art, Ball State University, Muncie, IN, 2013
- The Anatomy of a Home, Saarinen House, Cranbrook Art Museum, Bloomfield Hills, MI, 2013
- You in between, Middlesbrough Institute of Modern Art, UK, 2008

== Published works ==
Monographs

- Ruhwald vs. Stålhane (Jönsson, Love, ed.), Essays by Love Jönsson, Shelley Selim, Martina Margetts and Anders Ruhwald, Rian Design Museum, 2022, ISBN 978-91-971127-9-6
- The Body, The Mind, This Constructed World (Bochicchio, Luca Ed.), Essays by Luca Bochichio, Glenn Adamson, Ruth Baumeister, Casa Museo Jorn, 2018, ISBN 978-1-5323-9173-6
- The Anatomy of a Home (Wittkopp, G, ed.), Essays by Claudine Ise, Love Jönsson, Asdis Olafsdottir and Anders Ruhwald, Cranbrook Art Museum, USA, 2013, ISBN 978-0-9891864-0-7
- Anders Ruhwald, 2009–10, Lemberg Gallery, Detroit, 2010 ISBN 978-87-994340-0-8
- You in Between (Beighton, James, ed.), Essays by Louise Mazanti, Ezra Shales and Glenn Adamson, Middlesbrough Institute of Modern Art, UK, 2008 ISBN 978-0-86083-078-8
- Form and Function, Essay by Edmund de Waal, Exhibition Catalogue for IngerMolin Gallery, Sweden, 2007

Essays

- At Søge, Finde og Huske (To Search, Find and Retain), in Ruhwald vs. Stålhane (Jönsson, Love, ed.) Rian Design Museum, 2022, ISBN 978-91-971127-9-6
- The Anatomy of a Home in Contemporary Clay and Museum Culture (Brown, Christie; Julian Stair; Clare Twomey, eds.) Routledge, 2016 pp. 73–85 ISBN 978-1-4724-7037-9

Publications

- Ceramic Art And Civilization, Greenhalgh, Paul, Bloomsbury Visual Arts, Great Britain, 2021, ISBN 978-1-4742-3970-7, pp. 9, 468, 469
- Ler er Livet!, (Wirnfeldt, Pia, ed.), Clay Museum of Ceramic Art, ISBN 978-87-91135-54-5, pp 54, 139
- With Eyes Wide Open: Cranbrook Academy of Art Since 1932, (Blauvelt, Andrew, ed.), Cranbrook Art Museum, 2020 ISBN 978-1-7333824-1-0 pp. 504–05
- Rejsen som Redskab (Elna Svenle, ed.), Vandalorum, Sweden, 2020 ISBN 978-91-982723-4-5 pp. 34–42 and 116–17
- Objects USA (Adamson, Glenn, ed.), Monacelli Press, New York, 2020 ISBN 978-1-58093-573-9 pp. 188–89
- Landlord Colors (Blauvelt, Andrew, Judi Duki, Laura Mott and Ian Gabriel Wilson, eds.), Cranbrook Art Museum, p. 250 ISBN 978-0-9891864-9-0
- Vitamin C: Clay and Ceramics in Contemporary Art (Morrill, Rebecca, ed.), Phaidon Press Limited, 2017 ISBN 978-0-7148-7460-9 pp. 258–61
- Contemporary Clay, Ericson, Heather Mae (ed.), WCU Fine Arts Museum, Western Carolina University, pp 14, 54–55, ISBN 978-1-5323-2639-4
- Contemporary Clay and Museum Culture (Brown, Chiristie; Julian Stair; Clare Twomey, eds.) Routledge, 2016 pp. 73–85 ISBN 978-1-4724-7037-9
- The Making Process, (Cho, Hyeyoung, Ed.) 2015 Cheongju Craft Biennial, pp. 282–289, ISBN 979-11-956141-0-3
- 2011 Gyeonggi International Ceramics Biennial, (Choi, Hong-Chul, ed.), Korea Ceramics Foundation, 2011 pp. 34–35, 204, 210 ISBN 978-89-89748-88-5
- XXe Biennale Internationale de Céramique Contemporaine de Vallauris (Peltier, Yves, ed.) Somogy Editions, Paris, pp. 170–173 2008 ISBN 978-2-7572-0182-4
