= Samuel Levi Jones =

American artist

- Born: 1978 (age 47–48); Marion, Indiana, U.S.
- Education: Taylor University, Herron School of Art and Design, Mills College
- Website: samuellevijones.com

Samuel Levi Jones (born 1978) is an American artist, he is known for his paintings and assemblage art. Many of his works are abstract, and centered on African-American history, and identity; often using historically sourced materials.

== Biography ==
Samuel Levi Jones was born in 1978 in Marion, Indiana, into an African-American family. Jones is related (great nephew, through marriage) to Abraham S. Smith, one of the two men publicly lynched in 1930 in Marion, Indiana.

He attended Taylor University (B.A. degree in communications studies); Herron School of Art and Design (B.F.A. degree 2009 in photography); and Mills College (M.F.A. degree 2012 in studio art).

== Art Career ==
Levi Jones' first solo exhibition, Samuel Levi Jones: Left of Center (2019), took place at the Indianapolis Museum of Art at Newfields. He has also had a solo exhibition at The Dayton Contemporary in Ohio titled The Empire is Falling, and Unbound at the Studio Museum in Harlem, New York.

Jones work is included in public museum collections including the San Francisco Museum of Modern Art, the Whitney Museum of American Art, Rubell Museum, the Studio Museum in Harlem, the Fine Arts Museums of San Francisco, and the Los Angeles County Museum of Art (LACMA).

== See also ==
- List of African-American visual artists
- Paulson Fontaine Press
