= Linda Geary =

American artist (born 1960)

- Born: February 14, 1960 (age 65); Santa Rosa, California, U.S.
- Education: University of San Diego, University of Delaware
- Occupations: Visual artist, educator, printmaker
- Known for: Paintings, murals
- Movement: Abstract painting
- Website: www.lindageary.com

Linda Geary (born 1960) is an American visual artist and educator. She is known for her large scale abstract paintings and murals. Geary is chair of the painting department and a professor at the California College of the Arts in San Francisco. She lives in Oakland, California.

== Biography ==
Linda Geary was born on February 14, 1960, in Santa Rosa, California, to parents Therese (née Hassler) and William Geary. She received two B.A. degrees in 1982 from the University of San Diego, in fine arts and English; and received a M.F.A. degree in 1986 from the University of Delaware, in painting.

In her early career, Geary worked as a printmaker at Crown Point Press in San Francisco. She is known for her large scale abstract paintings and murals, which have their roots in collage. In 2021, Geary installed a mosaic mural titled "River" in the international terminal at San Francisco International Airport.

Her artwork has been reviewed in Artforum, Art Practical, Art in America, KQED, Huffington Post, The Sacramento Bee, The Mercury News, and the San Francisco Chronicle. Geary was awarded a MacDowell Fellowship in 2022; a Pollock-Krasner Foundation grant in 2021; and the Elizabeth Foundation grant in 1998.

Geary is a professor of painting, and the chair of the painting department at the California College of the Arts (CCA) in San Francisco.

== Exhibitions ==
=== Solo exhibitions ===
- Linda Geary: New Work (2000), Marcel Sitcoske Gallery, San Francisco, California
- Linda Geary: New Drawings and Paintings (2007), Rena Bransten Gallery, San Francisco, California
- All The Pink Together: Boom (2013), Steven Wolf Fine Arts, San Francisco, California

=== Group exhibitions ===
- Line as Element: Paintings by Linda Geary, Doug Glovaski, and Seiji Kunishima (1995), San Jose Institute of Contemporary Art, San Jose, California
- Abstraction Absolved: 10 Bay Area Painters (1996), Mills College (now Mills College at Northeastern University), Oakland, California
- The Possible (2014), Berkeley Art Museum, Berkeley, California
