= Ruby Neri =

American artist (born 1970)

Ruby Rose Neri
- Born: 1970 (age 55–56); California, United States
- Other names: Reminisce, REM
- Education: University of California, Los Angeles (MFA, 1998), San Francisco Art Institute (BFA, 1994)
- Known for: Painting, sculpture, ceramics, graffiti, murals
- Movement: Mission School
- Father: Manuel Neri
- Website: rubyroseneri on Instagram

Ruby Rose Neri (born 1970) is an American visual artist, known for her work as a sculptor and painter. She was born and raised in the San Francisco Bay Area, drawing creative influence from her parents and their friends. Neri is both a painter and a sculptor, and has worked with a wide array of materials including clay, plaster, bronze, steel, fiberglass, glaze, acrylic, oil, and spray paint.

Her work is based on abstraction and figuration, drawing inspiration from Bay Area Figuration, German Expressionism, graffiti, and folk art. She is based in Los Angeles, California. She previously worked as a graffiti writer in San Francisco, and used the pseudonyms Reminisce and REM.

== Early life and influences ==
Born to a family of artists, Neri was exposed to ways of making and expressing from a very young age. Her father is Manuel Neri, a prolific sculptor associated with the Bay Area Figurative Movement, and her mother, Susan Neri, is a graphic designer. Her mother's ability to render realistic images of human figures and horses proved to have a heavy influence in Neri's early work as a painter and a graffiti artist in the 1990s, and as subjects still remain in her work today.

The style that her father developed as a sculptor during the second generation of Bay Area Figuration also influenced Neri's work, which emerged later in her life as she made the switch from painting to sculpture. Comparing one of Neri's earlier figurative sculptures to the work that her father is best known for, a number of visual similarities are apparent and evoke the closeness of their relationship. Though their handling of materials, surface treatment, and subject matter are akin at first glance, a deeper look might reveal subtle yet important differences.

== Undergraduate studies: San Francisco Art Institute and the Mission School ==
In 1992, Ruby moved from San Rafael, California to San Francisco, California to study painting at the San Francisco Art Institute. Ruby's father, Manuel had previously taught at SFAI, making his presence and influence in her education almost unavoidable. Ruby stated in an interview that, “During undergrad at SFAI all my teachers were either my father's students or his contemporaries; I felt very limited by this but was unaware of it at the time”. Despite this limitation, her experience at SFAI proved to be one of the most influential times in her life and career.

While there, she became close friends with artists Alicia McCarthy, Barry McGee, and Margaret Kilgallen. She and her friends would later become associated with the movement known as “The Mission School”, canonized by the San Francisco Museum of Modern Art in 2010, when the institution deemed the Mission School, “...the most significant art movement to emerge out of San Francisco in the late twentieth century”. In the book “Energy That is All Around”, Curator Hesse McGraw credits this group of deeply connected artists with changing the “language” of SFAI as an institution, stating that, “They have come to reflect the highest achievement of an art school, which is to cultivate artists whose work adds new strains to contemporary art, and perhaps more importantly, who care about each other enough to add life to a community of artists”.

Members of The Mission School were associated with a particular cultural and artistic environment in San Francisco during the early to mid-1990s. Many of the artists grew up in and around art school during a period preceding widespread internet access. As they began developing their artistic careers, the emergence of digital technology and the dot-com boom in nearby Silicon Valley influenced the economic and social environment of the Bay Area. The period was also marked by increasing gentrification in San Francisco.[5]

Mission School artists were interested in anti-establishment and anti-consumerist concerns, as expressed in various subcultures in the Bay Area. The shared interests produced an aesthetic with which Neri's oeuvre is connected.

During Neri's time at SFAI, she formed her network of friends through a common interest in graffiti, which ultimately led to her inclusion in the Mission School movement. Although writing graffiti was more of a social and sometimes political outlet than a serious artistic pursuit for Neri, the influence of her time spent painting in the street is still visible in her work today.

== Graduate studies: UCLA ==
In 1994, Ruby moved from the Bay Area to Los Angeles, and would go on to earn her Master's of Fine Art from the University of California, Los Angeles in 1998. There, she made the gradual transition from producing mostly painting to sculpture. Her first foray into sculpture was through plaster, which she used to create abstracted figures of humans and horses in a style reminiscent of cubist painting. This transition was perhaps sparked by the fact that she was, for the first time, free of the impositions of her father's legacy. Her frustration with the weight of painting's history encouraged this transition into sculpture to continue. As Neri states in an interview for the Los Angeles Review of Books, “Painting is so demanding in terms of its history. The whole idea of what painting is became problematic for me and I didn't have the time to address all the issues that were not interesting to me at all...”.

== Current work ==
Having exhibited since the mid-1990s, Neri maintains a stimulating artistic practice through a commitment to experimentation. Throughout her career, she has explored the possibilities in paint (oil, acrylic, spray), plaster, and clay - her current work is a visual culmination of those explorations. Neri deftly combines elements of figuration, abstraction, graffiti, and folk art through clay, plaster, and paint to create complex, expressive and kinetic sculptures. Lately, Neri has focused her practice and is primarily making clay sculpture. Neri uses horses as a common motif in her work, which serves as a personal symbol of her youth.

Neri's most recent accomplishment is her inclusion in the book, “Vitamin C: Clay and Ceramic in Contemporary Art”, published in 2017. The book is a global survey of one hundred of today's leading clay and ceramic artists - Neri is included alongside notable artists such as Anders Ruhwald, Edmund de Waal, Theaster Gates, Ron Nagle, Grayson Perry, and Betty Woodman.

In an interview conducted for Phaidon, the publishers of “Vitamin C”, she notes the various ceramic artists she was surrounded by and exposed to throughout her childhood, including Richard Shaw, Viola Frey, Peter Voulkos, and Robert Arneson, amongst others. She also states that, “Although I was primarily a painter for many years, ceramics has been a major influence on how I approach materials and how I physically manipulate objects”. Despite and perhaps because of her lack of formal training in ceramics, Neri manipulates the material with a sense of naivety that demonstrates her belief that the history of ceramics is, like painting, “oppressive”.

Neri states in the same interview that she is currently most excited by the work of Viola Frey, citing the scale of Frey's monumental pieces and her fearlessness as a woman working amongst men as key inspirations.

== Personal life ==
Neri is married with one child. Her family home burned down during the January 2025 Southern California wildfires.
