= Gallery 16 =

Coordinates: 37°46′52.8″N 122°23′43.7″W

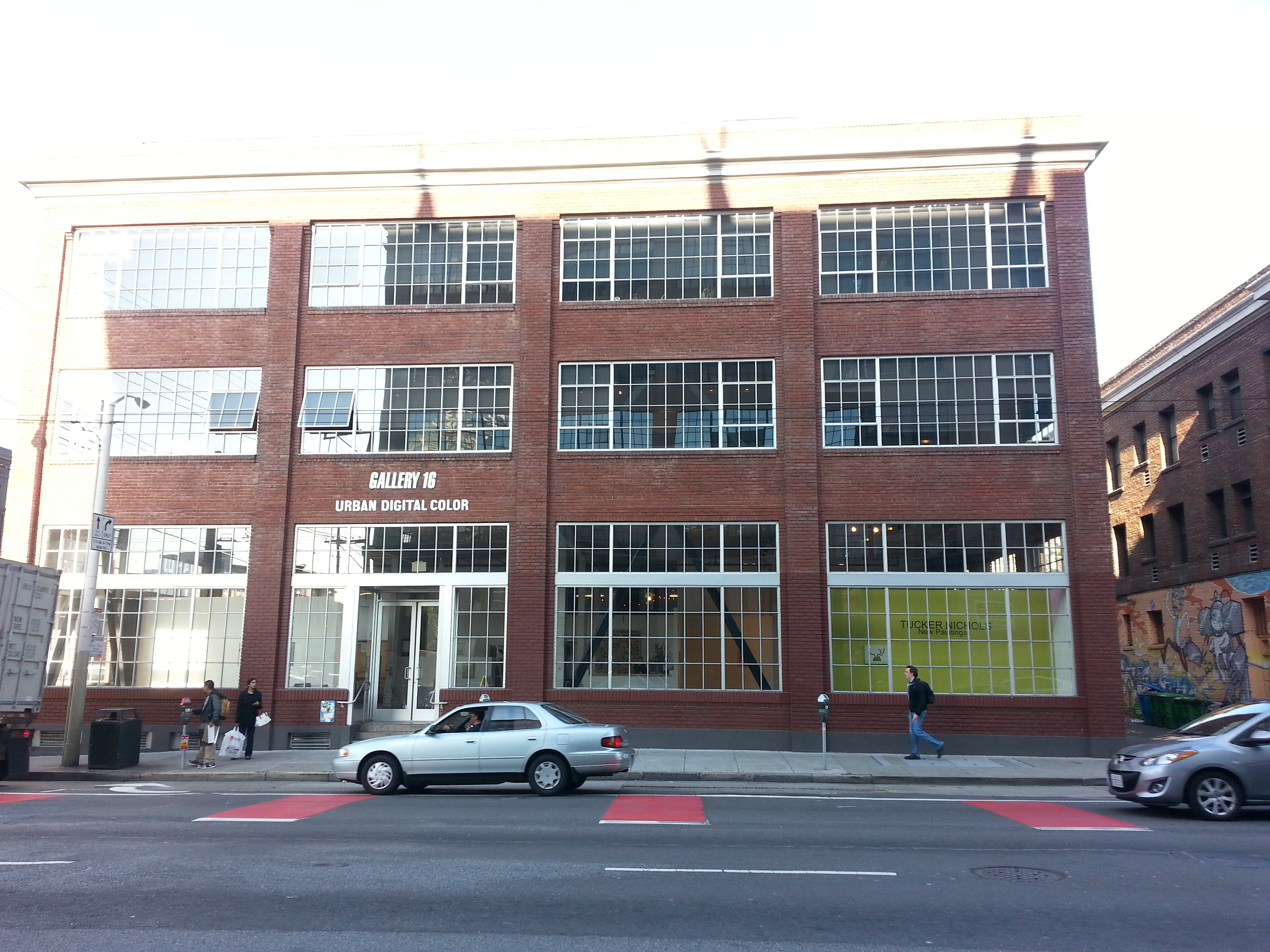
Exterior of Gallery 16

Gallery 16 was a contemporary art gallery located in the SoMa district of San Francisco, California. Owned by the San Francisco-based painter Griff Williams, and opened in 1993, Gallery 16 exhibited artists including Graham Gillmore, Tucker Nichols, Rex Ray, Alex Zecca, Shaun O'Dell, Josh Jefferson, Thomas Heinser, Libby Black, Margaret Kilgallen, Arturo Herrera, Michelle Grabner, and Mark Grotjahn. In 2010 it hosted an exhibition on Emigre magazine. Gallery 16 closed in September 2025.

== Gallery 16 Editions ==
Gallery 16 Editions is the gallery's publishing program. It utilizes contemporary printmaking methods to create portfolios and artist books. Its publications have included Barry Gifford's Las Quatro Reinas, Prince Andrew Romanoff's The Boy Who Would Be Tsar, James F. Miles' Is a Boyfriend And A Girlfriend with Harrell Fletcher, and Colter Jacobsen's Good Times: Bad Trips with Scott Hewicker and Cliff Hengst.
