= Whitney Williams =

American businesswoman

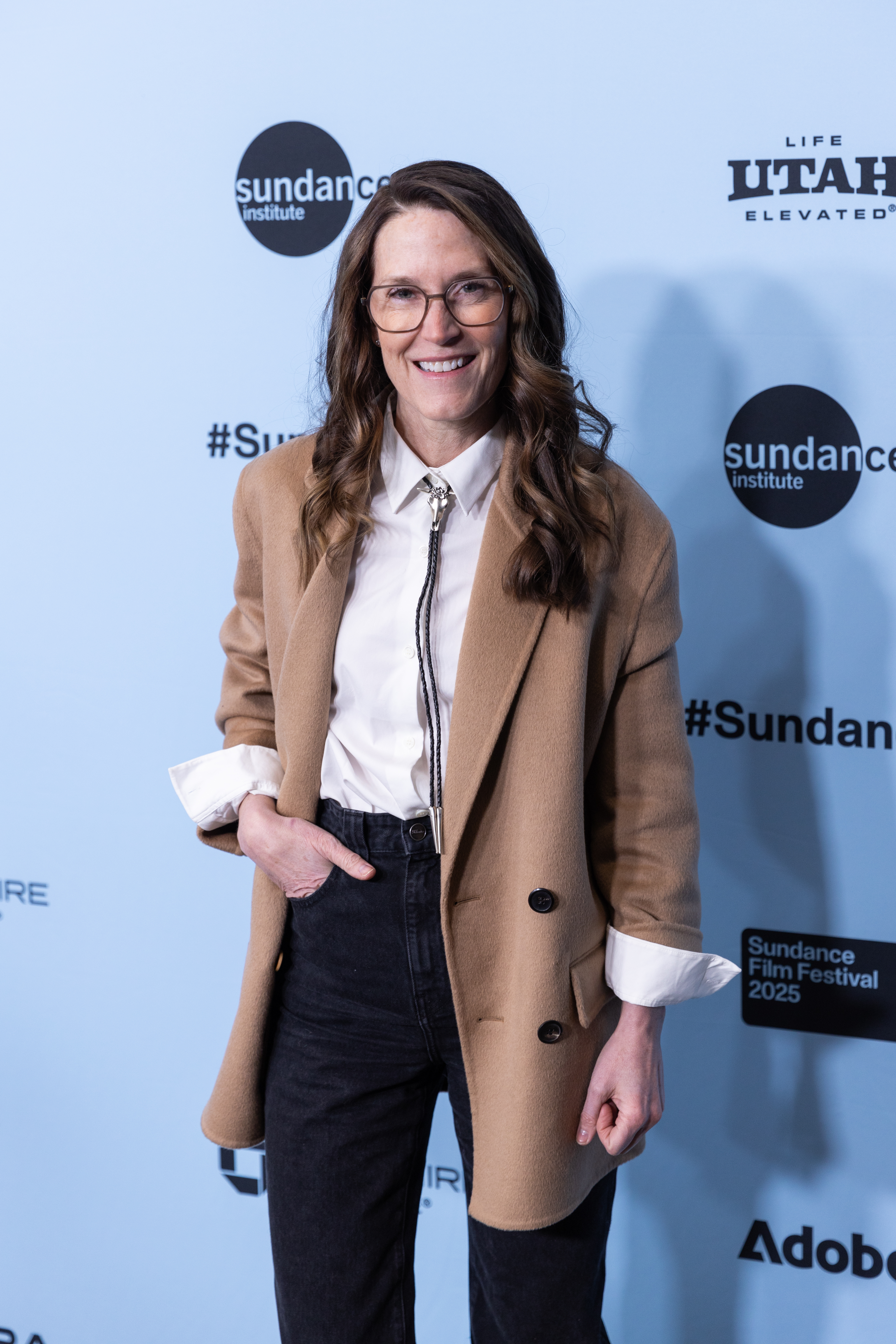

Personal details
- Born: 1970 or 1971 (age 54–55) Montana, U.S.
- Party: Democratic
- Parents: Pat Williams (father); Carol Williams (mother)
- Relatives: Griff Williams (brother)
- Education: University of Montana (BA)

Whitney Williams (born 1970/1971) is an American businesswoman and former political candidate. She is CEO and Founder of williamsworks and Full Glow Creative. In October 2019, Williams announced her candidacy for the 2020 Montana gubernatorial election, but she was defeated in the Democratic primary.

== Early life and education ==
Williams is a sixth-generation Montana native. She is the daughter of the former Montana Senate majority leader Carol Williams and former congressman Pat Williams. The Washington Post has called the Williams family the "first family of Montana politics."

Williams earned a Bachelor of Arts degree from the University of Montana, where she studied political science, forestry and Native American studies.

== Career ==
Williams runs the social impact firm williamsworks as well as the creative studio Full Glow Creative. Through her work with Full Glow, Williams has acted as an Executive Producer for the major motion picture Kiss of the Spider Woman (2025), and as an Executive Producer of COLECTIVO, produced in partnership with The Miranda Family and Tribeca. She also served as a producer for the revival of the Broadway classic GYPSY, starring Audra McDonald as Rose.

Williams previously worked in the Clinton administration, first as an intern, and then as travel director for first lady Hillary Clinton. Williams later served as Washington State finance cochairman for Hillary Clinton's 2008 presidential campaign.

In 2001, she joined Casey Family Programs and helped establish the $600 million Marguerite Casey Foundation. Since 2003, Williams has served as founder and CEO of williamsworks, a Montana-based consultancy agency. The firm has provided strategic services to nonprofit, philanthropic and corporate clients including Toms Shoes, the Bill & Melinda Gates Foundation, Nike Foundation, the Wikimedia Foundation and Thorn.

Williams is a member of the Council on Foreign Relations.

=== Philanthropy ===
Williams previously served on the board of trustees for the Glacier National Park Fund as well as on the boards of directors for City Year Seattle and New Futures. In 2010, Williams cofounded the Eastern Congo Initiative with Ben Affleck and serves on the board as vice chairman. In 2021, she founded the Snowbird Fund, which provides financial support for Montana families who are searching for missing family members.

=== Politics ===
On October 3, 2019, Williams announced her candidacy for Governor of Montana in 2020, receiving an endorsement from former governor Brian Schweitzer.

She faced incumbent lieutenant governor Mike Cooney but lost the June 2, 2020 Democratic primary with 45.14% of the vote. Cooney lost the general election to former congressman Greg Gianforte.

Democratic primary results
Party	Candidate	Votes	%
Democratic	Mike Cooney	81,527	54.86%
Democratic	Whitney Williams	67,066	45.14%
Total votes		148,593	100.00%
