= Alicia McCarthy =

American painter (born 1969)

- Born: 1969 (age 56–57); Oakland, California, United States
- Education: San Francisco Art Institute (BFA), University of California, Berkeley (MFA)
- Occupations: Visual artist, painter
- Known for: Painting
- Movement: Mission School
- Partner: Sahar Khoury
- Awards: 2013 Artadia award

Alicia McCarthy (born 1969) is an American painter. She is a member of San Francisco's Mission School art movement. Her work is considered to have Naïve or Folk character, and often uses unconventional media like housepaint, graphite, or other found materials. She is based in Oakland, California.

== Early life, family, and education ==
McCarthy was born in 1969, and grew up in Oakland, California.

She received her BFA degree from the San Francisco Art Institute in 1994; and an MFA degree from the University of California, Berkeley in 2007. While attending undergraduate in 1992, the dean of the San Francisco Art Institute (SFAI) addressed an angry letter criticizing her campus graffiti, claiming that her art "looks like shit". She also attended the Skowhegan School of Painting and Sculpture in Maine.

Her romantic partner is artist Sahar Khoury.

== Career ==
McCarthy was a key member of the Mission School movement, a punk artistic movement born in San Francisco. McCarthy painted graffiti under the names Fancy and Probe. She was a member of underground punk and LGBT movements in San Francisco in the early 1990s.

The Jack Hanley Gallery (San Francisco, Los Angeles and New York) has represented McCarthy for over 15 years including a solo New York City show and a two-person exhibition. In 2015, McCarthy had two major exhibitions: Snobody at V1 Gallery in Copenhagen and also Alicia McCarthy + Jenny Sharaf at Johansson Projects in Oakland. Most recently McCarthy participated in Major Work, curated by Andrew Schoultz at Chandran Gallery, San Francisco, and has also recently participated in Patterned Chaos at Cinders, New York, Off the Grid, curated by Susette Min at EN EM Art Space, Sacramento, Fertile Ground: Art and Community in California at The Oakland Museum of California Art and Pierogi X X: Twentieth Anniversary Exhibition at Pierogi in New York. In 2013, McCarthy exhibited in Energy That Is All Around: Mission School with Chris Johanson, Margaret Kilgallen, Alicia McCarthy, Barry McGee, Ruby Neri at the Walter and McBean Galleries, San Francisco Art Institute and the Grey Art Gallery, New York University.

McCarthy currently lives and works in Oakland, and incorporates California's culture into her much of her work. Although she has not been arrested since 2000, McCarthy has participated and advocated for the use of graffiti and street art in protest of capitalism. McCarthy's work, as part of the larger Mission School movement, is a direct response to the Dot-com bubble's effect on San Francisco's urban development.

== Mission School ==
The Mission School was composed of five artists all born in the late 1960s and living and working in the 1990s in San Francisco's Mission District when it was still a low-rent neighborhood. The artists bonded over punk music, skateboarding, graffiti, queer politics and zine publishing, and they shared an appreciation for funky cartooning, offbeat social satire, quirky abstraction, folk art and old-fashioned graphic styles. Combining craft/folk art and urban street and graffiti culture, Alicia McCarthy and this Mission School group of artists cultivated an art style that prized the handmade in an increasingly technologized society. McCarthy's art featured punk messages transformed into poetic and geometric forms.

== Style and materials ==
Alicia McCarthy, Untitled (2013)

McCarthy creates abstract paintings that fuse the aesthetics of American punk with those of outsider artists (a style sometimes referred to as "urban rustic"). She uses a variety of different kinds of paint (gouache, house paint, spray paint), often on found wood or paper and sometimes including text. Her radiating zigzags, interweaving lines, and stripes of bright colors have a handmade quality that appear as if they are moving with an internal energy. Found objects, text, and spray paint often make their way into these wood surfaces, so that McCarthy's colorful woven patterns and geometric blocks become personalized beyond their shapes. McCarthy's paintings are visually abstract, and yet her deceptively simple motifs — a weave or rainbow, for instance — are deeply personal and her works often include a clue of her personal and physical presence, such as the ring left by a coffee cup, print from a boot or a note written by the artist.

== Works ==
She is best known for her weave paintings, in which multi-colored lines weave together. She is also known for her series of color wheels, composed of shattered and interlocking arcs of color. She was also one of fifteen Bay Artists commissioned in 2015 by Meta (formerly Facebook Inc.) to create a site specific spray paint mural for their new Frank Gehry-designed Menlo Park headquarters.

In 2018, McCarthy painted her largest-to-date mural (some eight stories high) on the side of the Proper Hotel in the Tenderloin District. McCarthy's recent work shows a selective color palette on mixed-media panels to create art that is both intense and playful.

== Exhibitions ==
McCarthy's work has been shown at the Dallas Museum of Art, the Berkeley Art Center, and the Yerba Buena Center for the Arts in San Francisco. Her work was featured at the San Francisco Museum of Modern Art in July 2017. In 2013, her work was included in a major traveling exhibition, which was shown at the Craft and Folk Art Museum in Los Angeles, the San Francisco Art Institute, and the Grey Art Gallery at New York University.

- Fertile Ground: Art and Community in California, Oakland Museum of California (Sep, 2014)
- Snobody, V1 Gallery (Jan, 2015)
- Landscape: the virtual, the actual, the possible?, Yerba Buena Center for the Arts (Oct, 2014)
- PIEROGI X X: Twentieth Anniversary Exhibition, Pierogi (Sep, 2014)
- Alicia McCarthy + Jenny Sharaf, Johansson Projects (Jun, 2014)
- ENERGY THAT IS ALL AROUND/Mission School: Chris Johanson, Margaret Kilgallen, Alicia McCarthy, Barry McGee, Ruby Neri, Grey Art Gallery, NYU (Apr, 2014)
- Alicia McCarthy, Berggruen Gallery (March 2017)

=== Energy that is All Around ===
Energy that Is All Around was a formative exhibition of Mission School artists, curated by Natasha Boas at the San Francisco Art Institute. In response to the technology bubble of the ’90s, the Mission School artists sought to "detechnologize" contemporary art and reengage with folk and craft art.

== Awards and fellowships ==
- 2017 SECA (Society for the Encouragement of Contemporary Art) Award
- 2013 Artadia Award
- 1995 Skowhegan School of Painting and Sculpture fellow
- 1999 fellow at the Headlands Center for the Arts residency program.
