= Richard Jacob (disambiguation) =

Richard Jacob is a sports coach.

Richard Jacob may also refer to:

- Richard Taylor Jacob, American politician and attorney

== See also ==
- Richard Jacobs (disambiguation)
