= Krista Franklin =

African American poet and visual artist

- Born: United States
- Education: Kent State University (BA), Columbia College Chicago (MFA)
- Known for: Collage, poetry
- Movement: Afrofuturism, Afro-Surrealism
- Awards: Cave Canem Foundation Fellowship
- Website: kristafranklin.com

Krista Franklin is an American poet and visual artist, whose main artistic focus is collage. Her work, which addresses race, gender, and class issues, combines personal, pop-cultural, and historical imagery.

== Early life and education ==
Franklin is originally from Dayton, Ohio. She received her BA from Kent State University, and her MFA in Interdisciplinary Book & Paper Arts from Columbia College Chicago where, in 2013, she wrote her thesis titled The Two Thousand & Thirteen Narrative(s) of Naima Brown that brought to life a girl changeling on the precipice of young adulthood and has received recognition for her work from such prestigious programs as the Arts Incubator at the University of Chicago. She is based in Chicago, Illinois, where in 2007 she was the recipient of a Chicago Artist Assistance Program Grant for her art book SEED (The Book of Eve), which she says was based upon the dystopic visions of the award-winning African-American science-fiction writer Octavia E. Butler.

== Art ==
Franklin's artwork includes themes of surrealism and utopic and dystopic visions, with subtexts of black beauty, self-reflection, and the African Diaspora. She has described her approach as both Afro-Futurist and Afro-Surrealist. She has stated, "Inspiration is a myth created to feed the romantic lure around artists and artistry. Art is thinking and labor."

Her artwork has been featured in the television series Empire. Her collages have also been used on the covers of several poetry collections, including John Murillo’s Up Jumps the Boogie (2010) and Lita Hooper’s Thunder in Her Voice (2010). She has also had her work published in American Studies, Callaloo, and Ecotone.

Regarding her talent in the art of collage, Franklin said, "I learned the art of collage through watching my family make something out of nothing," she said, "That’s really where my collage aesthetic comes from. It comes from an idea of necessity, you know, how you make something beautiful out of scraps." In one of her series exploring race and gender, particularly in the context of the grotesque, she used human hair as a main material.

== Poetry ==
Franklin's writing was influenced by the poets of the Black Arts Movement, including Nikki Giovanni and Sonia Sanchez.

Her poetry is included in the anthologies The Bust Guide to the New Girl Order (Penguin Books, 1999) and Bum Rush the Page: A Def Poetry Jam (Penguin Books, 2001). She has had her poetry published in Black Camera. In 2011, she was a featured performer as well as a celebrity judge at the Gypsy Poetry Slam held in Lexington, Kentucky.

== Exhibitions ==
Dreams in Jay Z Minor was a collaboration with Amanda Williams (artist) and centers around utilizing male figures as muses. It incorporated rap lyrics, bible quotations, and, at first glance, ostentatious visuals. The exhibition was held at Blanc Gallery in Chicago from October 5 to December 29, 2012.

Library of Love was an interactive exhibition, described as a “visual love letter to Chicago”, created in collaboration with Stephen Flemister, Norman Teague, and Raub Welch. It featured a mix-tape made for the event by Perpetual Rebel. It was on view at the Arts Incubator in Washington Park in Chicago, 2014.

Like Water was an exhibition at the Center for Race, Politics, and Culture (CSRPC), curated by Dara Epison, and ran from October–December 2015. The exhibition featured a fictional character who is a shape shifter and black woman, named Naima Brown. The character sheds her hair with each transformation. Franklin was inspired to create the character by Octavia Butler's novel Wildseed. Additional collages were shown. Franklin gave an associated artist talk on October 23, 2015. .

Franklin was Creative Lead for the FEAR installation in White Box Gallery at the University of Dayton. It ran from November 10, 2015 – December 17, 2015. She transformed the prior installation, titled Consumption, into the new FEAR iteration. In conjunction, Franklin also hosted a free workshop called “Altering Fear: An Altered Book Workshop” on Saturday, November 7, 2015, from 2–4.

From February 12, 2016, until March 4, 2016, Franklin's exhibition Heavy Rotation was held at Lacuna Artist Lofts in Chicago. The show was comprised, in part, of paper works made from pulped album covers.

to take root among the stars was held at the Poetry Foundation from September 27, 2018 - January 24, 2019 and coincided with the publication of Under the Knife

Speculative Retrievals at the Salina Art Center is a group exhibition which runs from June 7-July 28, 2019 and also features the work of Julia Goodman and Sahar Khoury, who are also paper artists. Franklin gave an artist's talk at the opening. Franklin is also the artist-in-residence at the Salina Art Center Warehouse through June 23, 2019. In addition to other activities, Franklin plans to continue work on her “Heavy Rotation” series

Franklin's work was the subject of a large solo exhibition, Solo(s), at DePaul Art Museum from September 8, 2022 – February 19, 2023. Curated by Ionit Behar, Solo(s) highlighted the inherently collaborative nature of Franklin's visual art, which draws from poetry, music, and popular visual cultural. The exhibition later traveled to the Colorado Springs Fine Arts Center at Colorado College.

On June 7, 2024, Franklin opened any bright spark, her first exhibition with the Chicago-based gallery Western Exhibitions.

== Books ==
- SEED (The Book of Eve) for Octavia Butler (2006)
- Study of Love & Black Body: poems, Willow Books (2012)
- Under the Knife, Candor Arts (2018)
- Too Much Midnight, Haymarket Books (2020)
- Solo(s): Krista Franklin, DePaul Art Museum (2022)

== Awards and fellowships ==
- Cave Canem Foundation Fellowship
- 2018 — Joan Mitchell Foundation Painters and Sculptors Grant
- 2020 — Helen and Tim Meier Foundation for the Arts Achievement Award

== Quotes ==
- "Inspiration is a myth created to feed the romantic lure around artists and artistry. Art is thinking and labor."
