= Eastern Congo Initiative =

American non-profit organization

Coordinates: 47.650214°N 122.349989°W

- Founded: 2010
- Type: Nonprofit organization
- Purpose: Grant making, Political advocacy
- Founder: Ben Affleck, Whitney Williams
- Website: www.easterncongo.org

The Eastern Congo Initiative (ECI) is an American nonprofit organization established by Ben Affleck and Whitney Williams in 2010 as "the first U.S.-based advocacy and grant-making initiative wholly focused on working with and for the people of eastern Congo". ECI provides development grants and international advocacy for community-building initiatives in the Democratic Republic of Congo.

== Background ==
Affleck began to explore the possibility of becoming more actively involved in philanthropy in 2007 and was drawn to New York Times columnist Nicholas Kristof's coverage of human rights abuses in the Democratic Republic of Congo. During two 2008 trips, Affleck reported on the humanitarian crisis for ABC News Nightline and directed a short film, Gimme Shelter, for the UN Refugee Agency. He also spoke at the Combating Global Poverty event during the 2008 Democratic National Convention. In 2009, he wrote an essay for Time, spoke at the Global Leadership Awards, and served as an executive producer of the HBO documentary film Reporter, which focused on Kristof's work in the Congo. After five visits to eastern Congo between 2007 and early 2010, Affleck developed "a clearer sense of what I wanted to do... What I found was that the people doing the best work, with the real expertise, who understood what was needed intuitively, just like they would in my neighborhood, who knew who the guy was to talk to, were community-based organizations."

== Aims ==
In 2010, Affleck and Whitney Williams co-founded the Eastern Congo Initiative. Early investors included Howard Graham Buffett, Google, Laurene Powell Jobs, Pam Omidyar and Cindy McCain. ECI acts as a grant maker for Congolese-led, community-based organizations. ECI, with two employees in the US and 12 in the Congo, fundraises, makes grants and offers capacity-building support to over 20 charities. These local charities support survivors of rape and sexual violence, help to reintegrate child soldiers into their communities, promote economic opportunity, increase access to health care and education, and promote community-level peace and reconciliation. In an effort to create sustainable wealth, ECI offers training and resources to cooperatives of Congolese farmers while leveraging public-private partnerships. In 2010, ECI partnered cacao farmers with Seattle-based Theo Chocolate and, as of 2014, Theo is the biggest sourcer of cocoa beans in the Congo. In 2011, ECI began supporting coffee farmers to increase the quality and quantity of their crop production; Starbucks began exporting their coffee beans in 2015.

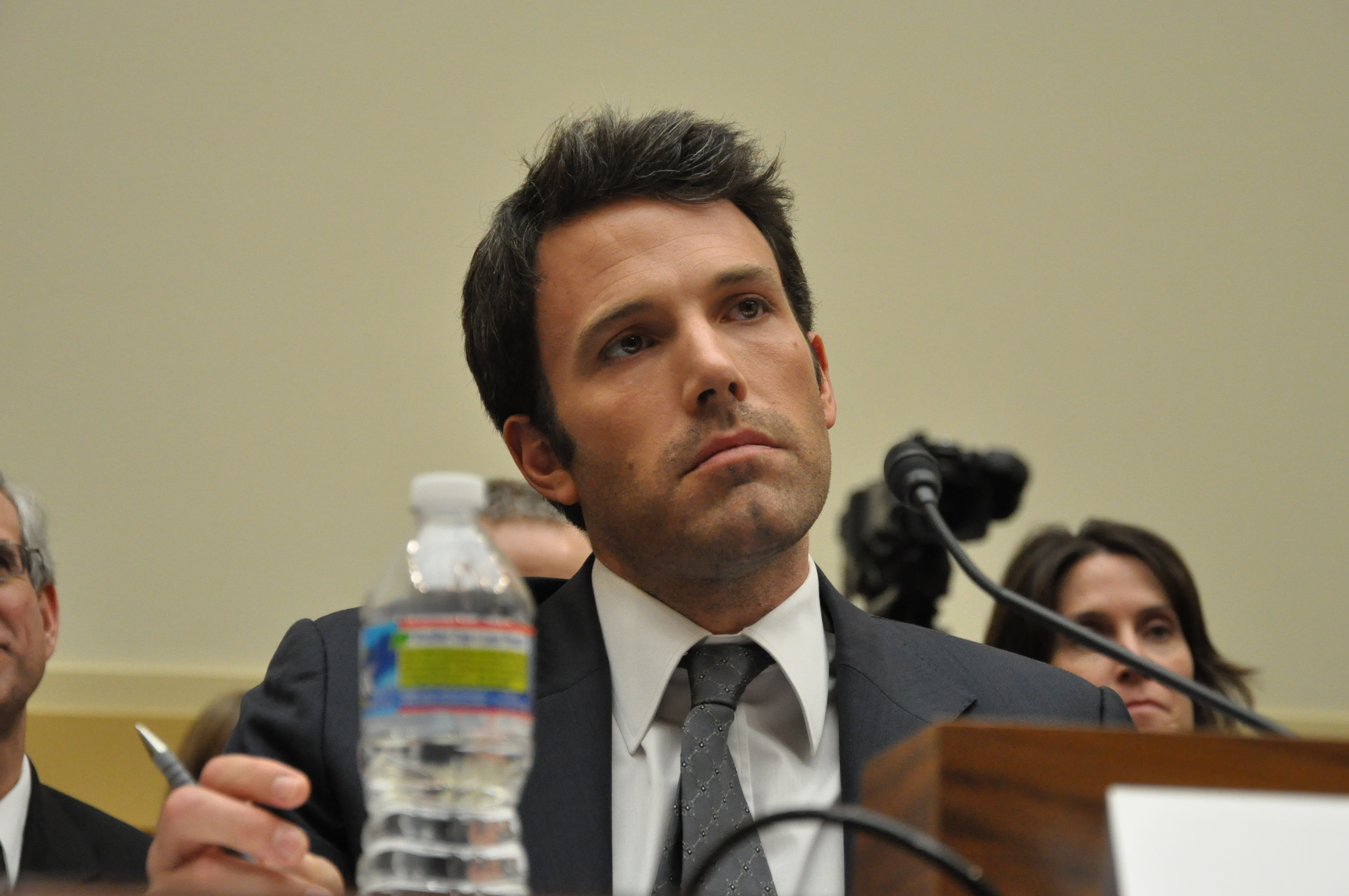
Affleck in 2011, testifying before the House Subcommittee on Africa, Global Health and Human Rights

ECI also advocates with and on behalf of the people of eastern Congo to raise public awareness and drive policy change in the US. In an effort to achieve this goal, ECI has published a white paper and a USAID-supported landscape analysis and searchable database of over 400 of the most effective community-based organizations. Affleck has made nine media-documented trips to Central Africa since 2007 and has discussed ECI's work in many television interviews. In 2010, he wrote a column for The Washington Post, contributed an essay to The Enough Moment and appeared as a panelist at the Center for Strategic and International Studies. In 2011, Affleck and Cindy McCain, an ECI board member, testified before the House Subcommittee on Africa, Global Health and Human Rights. Also in 2011, Affleck was a speaker at the Global Philanthropy Forum. In 2012, he spoke alongside Secretary of State Hillary Clinton at Washington's Child Survival: Call to Action Forum and alongside Senator John McCain at the Sedona Forum. He wrote op-eds for The Washington Post and Politico. During the Kony 2012 campaign, Affleck wrote an essay for The Huffington Post. While welcoming increased awareness of the issue of child soldiers, he warned that Western 'saviours' are "ineffectual at best and deadly at worst" and stressed the importance of funding "remarkable local organisations." Later in 2012, Affleck testified before the House Armed Services Committee and met with members of the Senate Foreign Relations Committee. In 2013, Affleck introduced the Orchestre Symphonique Kimbanguiste at a TED conference and began developing an Africa-set film. Also that year, President of Rwanda Paul Kagame was photographed arriving at Affleck's Los Angeles home; Affleck had testified before Congress in 2012 about the Rwandese government's support of rebel groups in eastern Congo. In early 2014, he and US Special Envoy Russ Feingold testified before the Senate Foreign Relations Committee and met with Secretary of State John Kerry. He also spoke at the Hillary Rodham Clinton Awards, where Denis Mukwege was honored. In 2015, Affleck testified before the Senate Appropriations Committee on State, Foreign Operations, and Related Projects while, in early 2016, he was a speaker at the Starkey Expo.
