= Carol Williams (politician) =

American politician (born 1949)

Member of the Montana Senate from the 46th district
- In office 2004–2012
- Succeeded by: Sue Malek

Personal details
- Born: September 3, 1949 (age 77) Butte, Montana, U.S.
- Party: Democratic
- Spouse: Pat Williams
- Children: Griff; Whitney
- Education: University of Montana Western

Carol Griffith Williams (born September 3, 1949) is a Democratic member of the Montana Senate. She represented District 46 from 2004 to 2012. In 2011, she was the Leader of the Democratic Caucus. She is the first woman to hold the position of majority leader in Montana history. She was previously a member of the Montana House of Representatives from 1999 through 2000.

In 2000, she ran for lieutenant governor of Montana. She and the governor nominee, Mark O'Keefe, lost in the general election to Judy Martz.

Her husband, Pat Williams, is a former member of congress from Montana.
