= Crown Point Press =

Printmaking workshop in San Francisco

Crown Point Press is a long-established printmaking workshop, primarily creating and publishing etched, intaglio prints. Located in San Francisco since 1986, Crown Point Press was first established in 1962 in Richmond California by Kathan Brown. Crown Point Press works with artists by invitation-only and has published prints by over 100 artists including Anne Appleby, John Baldessari, Robert Bechtle, Chuck Close, John Cage, Elaine de Kooning, Richard Diebenkorn, Alex Katz, Ed Ruscha, and Pat Stier.

They are identified as the publisher of a fictional collection of letters featured in the Spike Jonze 2013 film, Her.

Former printmakers or employees of Crown Point Press include Renee Bott (formerly of Paulson Bott Press), Pamela Paulson (of Paulson Fontaine Press), Brian Shure, Linda Geary, Paul Mullowney, John Silvon, Patrick Foy, Daria Sywulak, Stephen Thomas (formerly of Oxbow School), Tadashi Toda, and Hidekatsu Takada.
