= Martin Smith (potter) =

English ceramics and glass professor (born 1950)

- Born: 1950 (age 75–76); Essex, England
- Education: Bristol Polytechnic
- Occupations: Ceramics and glass professor
- Organization: Royal College of Art

Martin Smith (born 1950) is professor of ceramics and glass at the Royal College of Art in London.

== Work and career ==
He was born in Essex, England and was educated at Bristol Polytechnic (1971–74) and the Royal College of Art (1971–77), where he studied the technique of raku. He worked from a studio in Suffolk, later moving to London.

Smith's early works were large raku bowls which were precise and geometric, departing from the tradition of Japanese raku. From the 1980s he has formed his ceramics by press moulding or throwing red earthenware clay which is subsequently altered by cutting and grinding. He adds metal and gold leaf to the interiors of his pieces and sometimes adds slate or sheet metal to the base. "Smith's work is far removed from the spontaneity, plasticity and softness associated with clay; his is tough, hard edged, planned, measured and architectonic."

A key figure in British ceramics, he taught at Loughborough College of Art & Design (1983–85) and Camberwell College of Art (1986–89). He joined the staff of the Royal College of Art in 1989 and was appointed professor of ceramics and glass in 1999.

== Exhibit form ==
Smith is one of a group of potters, including Elizabeth Fritsch, Alison Britton, Ewen Henderson, Gordon Baldwin and Richard Slee who make a small number of sculptural pieces that they tend to exhibit on plinths

== Collections ==
His ceramics are represented in public collections including those of the Victoria & Albert Museum, the National Museum of Modern Art, Tokyo, the Los Angeles County Museum of Art and the Stedelijk Museum, the Metropolitan Museum of New York. A major retrospective exhibition was held at the Museum Boijmans van Beuningen, Rotterdam in 1996.
