= Tucker Nichols =

American artist, b. 1970

- Born: May 14, 1970 (age 55)
- Education: Brown University (BA); Yale University (MA)
- Known for: Drawing, painting, sculpture, books, performance
- Website: tuckernichols.com

Tucker Nichols (born May 14, 1970) is an American artist. His artwork includes drawings, paintings, sculptures, books, in-gallery cinema and performance spaces, as well as large scale works on walls and storefront windows. He has a BA from Brown University and an MA from Yale University, both in the history of Chinese Painting. He lives near San Francisco.

== Career ==
=== Exhibitions and museum work ===
Tucker Nichols' work has been featured at the San Francisco Museum of Modern Art, the Contemporary Jewish Museum, the Asian Art Museum of San Francisco, the Drawing Center, Den Frie Museum in Copenhagen, the Denver Art Museum, and the Aldrich Art Museum.

In 2012, Nichols was commissioned to design the performance space and signage for Stage Presence, Theatricality in Art and Media at SFMOMA.

Nichols has been commissioned to create artwork for several hospitals, including UCSF Medical Center in San Francisco and the Stanford Hospital in Stanford, California.

=== Publications ===
Nichols' drawings have been published in The New Yorker, The New York Times, McSweeney's, The New York Review of Books, Lapham's Quarterly, and The Thing Quarterly.

Crabtree, a children's book by Jon and Tucker Nichols, was published by McSweeney's in 2013. This Bridge Will Not Be Gray, a book by Dave Eggers and Tucker Nichols, was published by McSweeney's in 2015. Flowers for Things I Don't Know How to Say was published by Chronicle Books in 2024. Mostly Everything: The Art of Tucker Nichols will be published by McSweeney's in July 2025.

=== COVID-19 project ===
In the early months of the COVID-19 pandemic, Nichols launched Flowers for Sick People, a multimedia project connecting patients and their loved ones. This project has been featured at SFMOMA, the Palo Alto Art Center, and on the NewsHour on PBS nationwide.

=== Other activities ===
Tucker Nichols has served as an artist trustee at the Headlands Center for the Arts and most recently, SFMOMA. He is represented by Gallery 16 in San Francisco.

== Selected exhibitions ==
- SFMOMA, San Francisco, Close to Home, Creativity in Crisis. March 6 – September 5, 2021.
