= William Norwich =

American writer and editor

William Norwich is an American writer and author. He is a former editor at Vogue and the former New York Post society gossip columnist. He is the editor for fashion and interior design at Phaidon Press.

His novel My Mrs. Brown was inspired by the 1958 Paul Gallico novel Mrs. 'Arris Goes to Paris.

== Books ==
- My Mrs. Brown (Simon & Schuster, 2016)
- Learning to Drive (Atlantic Monthly Press, 1996)
- Molly and the Magic Dress (Doubleday, 2001)
