= Mission School =

Art movement in the 1990s and 2000s in Mission District, San Francisco, California

Murals, LACMA parking garage (now torn down) by Barry McGee (Twist)

The Mission School (sometimes called "New Folk" or "Urban Rustic") is an art movement of the 1990s and 2000s, centered in the Mission District, San Francisco, California.

== History and characteristics ==
This movement is generally considered to have emerged in the early 1990s around a core group of artists who attended (or were associated with) San Francisco Art Institute. The term "Mission School", however, was not coined until 2002, in a San Francisco Bay Guardian article by Glen Helfand.

The Mission School is closely aligned with the larger lowbrow art movement, and can be considered to be a regional expression of that movement. Artists of the Mission School take their inspiration from the urban, bohemian, "street" culture of the Mission District and are strongly influenced by mural and graffiti art, comic and cartoon art, and folk art forms such as sign painting and hobo art. These artists are also noted for use of non-traditional artistic materials, such as house paint, spray paint, correction fluid, ballpoint pens, scrapboard, and found objects. Gallery work by these artists is often displayed using the "cluster method", in which a number of individual works (sometimes by different artists) are clustered closely together on a gallery wall, rather than the traditional gallery display method of widely separating individual works.

Street art has always been an important part of the Mission School aesthetic. Several Mission School artists crossed over into San Francisco's burgeoning graffiti art scene of the 1990s, notably Barry McGee (who wrote under the name "Twist"), Ruby Neri (a.k.a. "Reminisce"), Dan "Plasma" Rauch, and Margaret Kilgallen (a.k.a. "Meta").

== Artists ==
Artists considered to be part of the Mission School (past or present) have included:

- Thomas Campbell
- Bill Daniel
- Margaret Kilgallen
- Chris Johanson
- Alicia McCarthy
- Barry McGee
- Ruby Neri
- Rigo 23
- Clare Rojas
- Scott Williams

The profiles of these artists were raised by the inclusion of the work of McGee in the 2001 Venice Biennale and the works of Chris Johanson and Margaret Kilgallen in the 2002 Whitney Biennial.

== New Mission School ==
In 2003, not long after the term "Mission School" was coined, a panel at the Commonwealth Club of California named several emerging San Francisco artists as constituting a "New Mission School". These artists included Andrew Schoultz, Dave Warnke, Sirron Norris, Neonski, Ricardo, Damon Soule, Misk, and NoMe, though many of these artists do not embrace the "Mission School" label.

== Criticism ==
Mural, LACMA parking garage (now torn down) by Margaret Kilgallen (Meta)

The term Mission School has been criticized for being too geographically specific (many artists outside of San Francisco share this aesthetic, while others living in the Mission District do not), while at the same time being a vague catch-all, with many artists who are referred to as Mission School having a hard time seeing how they are part of this "school".

== Galleries and other venues ==
Galleries, museums, and sites closely associated with the Mission School include:

- Adobe Books
- Southern Exposure Gallery
- New Langton Arts
- Yerba Buena Center for the Arts
- Deitch Projects
- Luggage Store Gallery
- Jack Hanley Gallery

== See also ==
- Neo-expressionism
- Global Village Coffeehouse
