= Paul Greenhalgh =

British art historian, curator, museologist and art historian

- Born: October 21, 1955 (age 71); Bolton, Lancashire, England
- Education: University of Reading; Courtauld Institute of Art
- Occupations: author, museologist, curator, scholar
- Years active: 1980–present
- Notable work: Ephemeral vistas, 1851–1939 (1988); Modernism in Design (1990); The Persistence of Craft (2002); Ceramic, Art and Civilisation (2020)
- Title: Director of the Zaha Hadid Foundation; Executive Director of the Sainsbury Centre for Visual Arts
- Website: www.paulgreenhalgh.net

Paul Greenhalgh (born 1955) is a British historian, writer, museologist, and curator of art and design.

Training initially as a painter, Greenhalgh entered into academia through the Courtauld Institute of Art, later teaching at the Royal College of Art, and holding the post of deputy keeper of ceramics and glass at the Victoria and Albert Museum in London. In November 2010, Greenhalgh was appointed director of the Sainsbury Centre for Visual Arts, the public gallery of the University of East Anglia, where he held the position of professor of art history and museum strategy, roles which he resigned from in 2021 to become, respectively, executive director, and professor emeritus of the same. In 2022, Greenhalgh was announced as the inaugural director of the Zaha Hadid Foundation. Greenhalgh is a specialist in the decorative arts and artistic movements from 1850 to 1940.

== Background ==
Greenhalgh was born in Bolton, Lancashire, England, where he attended Smithills Grammar School. Initially studying as a painter, he obtained bachelor's degrees in fine art, and later in art history, from the University of Reading, and the Courtauld Institute in London.

In 1980, Greenhalgh became a lecturer at Cardiff College of Art and Design, teaching there until a move to the Royal College of Art, where he tutored until 1992; between 1989 and 2000 Greenhalgh was deputy keeper of ceramics and glass, as well as head of research, at the Victoria and Albert Museum, later leaving the V&A museum to become president of the Nova Scotia College of Art and Design in Canada. Following a six-year term, Greenhalgh became president and director of the Corcoran Gallery of Art and College of Art and Design, Washington D.C. (2006-2010). He then returned to England to take up the post of director of the Sainsbury Centre.

== Exhibitions ==
Greenhalgh has organised major temporary exhibitions, managing exhibition programmes and displaying permanent collections. As Head of Research at the Victoria & Albert Museum he had a leadership and academic role in both the V&A exhibition programme and various major collection displays. In 2000, he curated 'Art Nouveau 1890–1914', which travelled to the National Gallery of Art in Washington DC, and the Metropolitan Museum in Tokyo. At the Corcoran Gallery, he created a large-scale exhibitions programme. These included Eadweard Muybridge; Richard Avedon’s 'Political Portraits'; The American Evolution: Art and Society 1790 to the Present; The French Landscape: Realism to Modernism, 1840–1914; Re-Defined: Modern and Contemporary Works from the Permanent Collection. In 2011, the Corcoran simultaneously had two major exhibitions in London: John Singer Sargent and the Sea at the Royal Academy of Arts, and Edward Muybridge at Tate Britain. The Sainsbury Centre has a major exhibition programme.

== Publications ==
- 2020 – Ceramic, Art and Civilisation. London: Bloomsbury Academic/HENI Publishing.
- 2020 – The Nature of Dreams: England and the Formation of Art Nouveau. United Kingdom: Sainsbury Centre, 2020 (editor and principal author).
- 2018 – Being Modern: The Cultural Impact of Science in the Early Twentieth Century. United Kingdom: UCL Press, 2018 (editor with Morag Shiach, Robert Bud, and Frank James).
- 2018 – Brian Clarke: The Art of Light. United Kingdom: Sainsbury Centre for Visual Arts/Heni Publishing, 2020 (with Norman Foster).
- 2013 – L’Art Nouveau: La Revolution Décorative. France: Pinocothéque de Paris.
- 2011 – Fair World: A History of World’s Fairs and Expositions 1851-2010. London: Papadakis.
- 2005 – The Modern Ideal: The Rise and Collapse of Idealism in the Visual Arts from the Enlightenment to Postmodernism. London and New York: Victoria and Albert Museum, Abrams.
- 2002 – The Persistence of Craft: The Applied Arts Now (principal author and editor). London: A&C Black; New York: Rutgers.
- 2000 – Art Nouveau 1890–1914. London and New York: V&A, Abrams; Gallimard (French translation).
- 2000 – The Essential Art Nouveau. London: Victoria & Albert Museum; New York: Abrams.
- 1993 – Quotations and Sources on Design and the Decorative Arts 1800–1990. United Kingdom: Manchester University Press.
- 1990 – Modernism in Design (principal author and editor). London: Reaktion. Japanese edition published 1997.
- 1989 – Ephemeral Vistas: The Expositions Universelles, Great Exhibitions and World's Fairs, 1851–1939. United Kingdom: MUP.

== Other positions and activities ==
Greenhalgh has held the following positions:

- 2001 and ongoing – Honorary fellow of research, V&A Museum, London
- 2010–2015 – Chair of art and design in the British government's research audit, the Research Excellence Framework (REF)
- 2011–2016 – Chair of the Arts Advisory Committee at the University of Edinburgh
- 2016 and ongoing – Advisory Council Winston Churchill Memorial Trust
- 2017 and ongoing – Fellow of the Royal Society of Arts
