= Clare Rojas =

American artist (born 1976)

Clare E. Rojas
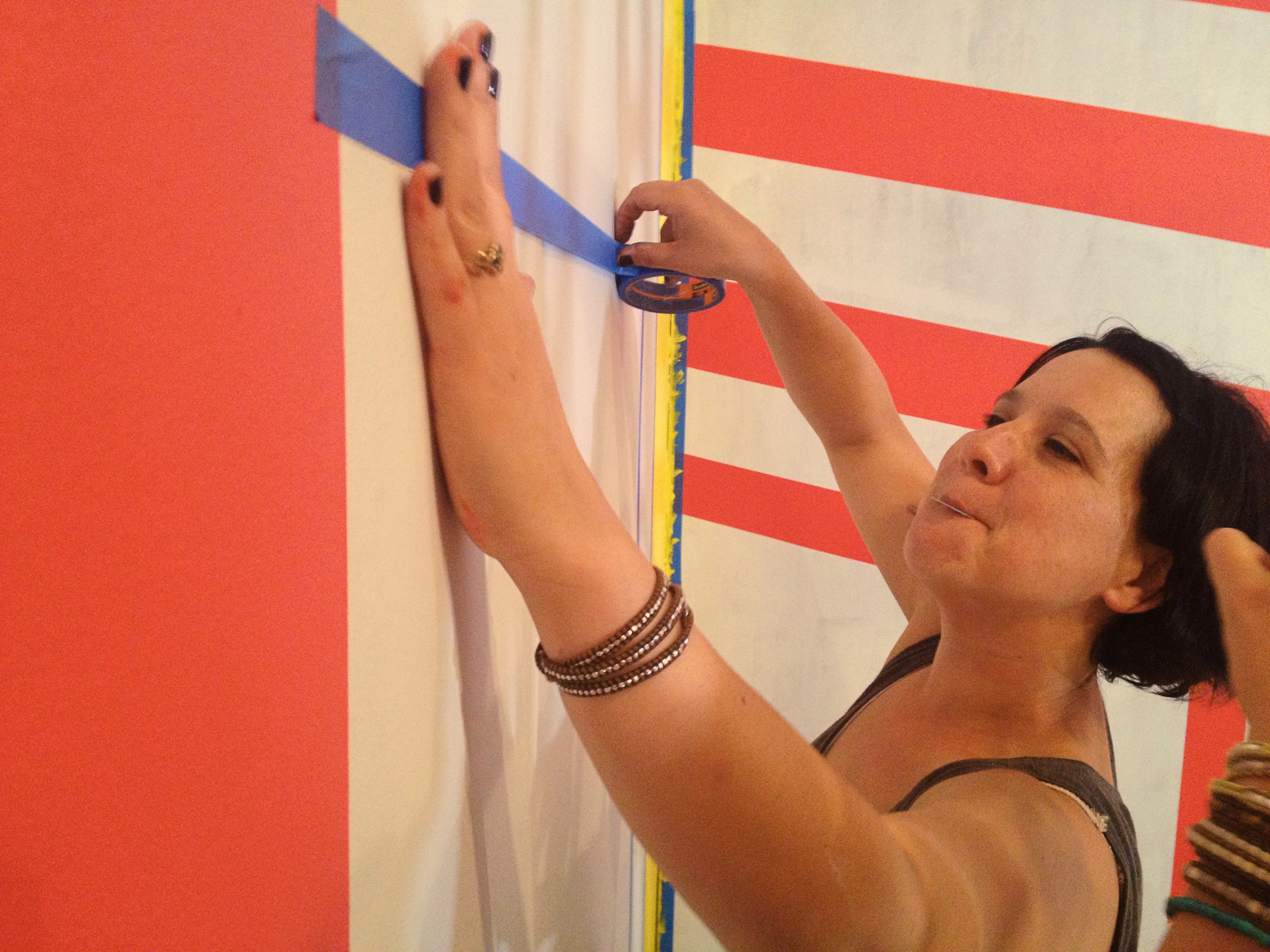
- Born: 1976 (age 49–50); Columbus, Ohio
- Other name: Peggy Honeywell
- Education: Rhode Island School of Design, School of the Art Institute of Chicago
- Occupations: Visual artist, musician
- Known for: Painting, installation art, video art, street art, children's books illustrations

Clare E. Rojas (born 1976), also known by stage name Peggy Honeywell, is an American multidisciplinary artist. She is part of the Mission School. Rojas is "known for creating powerful folk-art-inspired tableaus that tackle traditional gender roles." She works in a variety of media, including painting, installations, video, street art, and children's books. Rojas lives in the San Francisco Bay Area.

== Early life and education ==
Clare Rojas was born in 1976 in Columbus, Ohio. She is of half-Peruvian descent. As a teenager, Rojas visited a nursing home, where she would make portraits in pastel and oil, while she listened to the interesting stories of her subjects.

She received a BFA degree in Printmaking from the Rhode Island School of Design (RISD); and a MFA degree from the School of the Art Institute of Chicago. At RISD, she studied printmaking, which informed her use of color, layering and sizing. In her search for non toxic paint, she discovered gouache, which she used to paint like a printmaker.

== Career ==
Rojas work is inspired by folk art. She loves quilts and loves to tell stories, which is reflected in her work.

In her more recent work, Rojas has moved from figurative paintings into pure geometric abstraction. Inspired by Native American textiles, Quaker Art, and Byzantine mosaics, Rojas creates narratives depicting interactions between humans and animals, focusing on history’s journey to find peace. She brings multiple artistic influences together in her textiles by incorporating abstract geometry found in quilts and architecture. Rojas is known for adding elements of female sexuality into her artwork. She does this to give credit to women and recognize their natural strengths.

=== Peggy Honeywell ===
Rojas also plays guitar and banjo under the stage name Peggy Honeywell. She has released three albums: Honey For Dinner (2001), Faint Humms (2005), and Green Mountain (2006).

== Personal life ==
Rojas married fellow artist Barry McGee in 2005. She adopted his daughter, Asha (Sanskrit for hope), from his previous marriage to Margaret Kilgallen.

== Selected solo exhibitions ==
- SOCO Gallery, Charlotte, NC 2019
- Egret, Kavi Gupta, Chicago, IL, 2018
- SOCO Gallery, Charlotte, NC 2016
- Alice Gallery, Brussels, Belgium 2016
- Gallery Paule Anglim, San Francisco, CA, 2014
- San Francisco Museum of Modern Art, Artists Gallery, San Francisco, CA, 2010, "Male Preserve"
- Museo de Arte Contemporáneo de Castilla y León, Leon, Spain, 2007
- The Rose Art Museum, Waltham MA, 2006
- Knoxville Museum of Art, Knoxville, TN, 2005
- Deitch Projects, New York, NY, 2004
- Museum of Contemporary Art, Chicago, IL, 2002

== Public art ==
- SFO, International Terminal, Gate G Level 3 - Blue Deer 2006-2007, Oil and Pigmented Ink with Gesso Ground on Wood Panels
- 982 Market Street, San Francisco, the side of the Warfield Theater - Mural 2014, commissioned by The Luggage Store Gallery and funded by Walter and Elise Haas Fund/Creative Work Fund.

== Awards ==
- Project Space Residency, 2003
- Tournesol Award, Headlands Center for the Arts, 2003
- Artadia Award, 2005
- Eureka Fellowship Award, 2005–2007
- Walter and Elise Haas Fund, 2013–2014
- Ox-Bow School of Art, Artist-in-Residence, 2016

== Albums ==
Clare Rojas performs under the stage name Peggy Honeywell. She has released three albums:

- Honey for Dinner (2001)
- Faint Humms (2005)
- Green Mountain (2006)
