= Rich Jacobs =

American artist and curator (born 1972)

Rich Jacobs (January 11, 1972 - November 28, 2025) was an American artist and curator. Jacobs has exhibited in the United States, Europe, Australia, New Zealand and Japan. In 2008, his work Minor Threat Family Tree was featured prominently along with other works of his at the London Ontario Live Arts Festival in Canada.

Inspired by graffiti, psychedelic and folk art, Jacobs' raw, colorful work frequently appears on a broad range of materials such as magazines, books, CD and LP covers (including most of the albums for the Salt Lake City-based group Iceburn), footwear, apparel (such as parkas, skirts and dresses), skateboards, buildings and pillows.

Following his death in 2025, a memorial event in NYC was held at Union Pool for Jacobs that included tributes, performances, and food. Tributes included words by Miggy Littleton, Pat Delaney, Rob Jacobs, Kate Horowitz, Robert Aiki and Aubrey Lowe. Audio submissions by David Pajo, Tim Kerr, Daniel Higgs and Fumie Ishii, Pall Jenkins and Toby Nathaniel. Performances by Ryan Sawyer, David Grubbs, Walter Schreifels, Chuck Bettis, Jacob Long, Miggy Littleton and Elizabeth Mitchel.
