= Barry McGee =

American painter (born 1966)

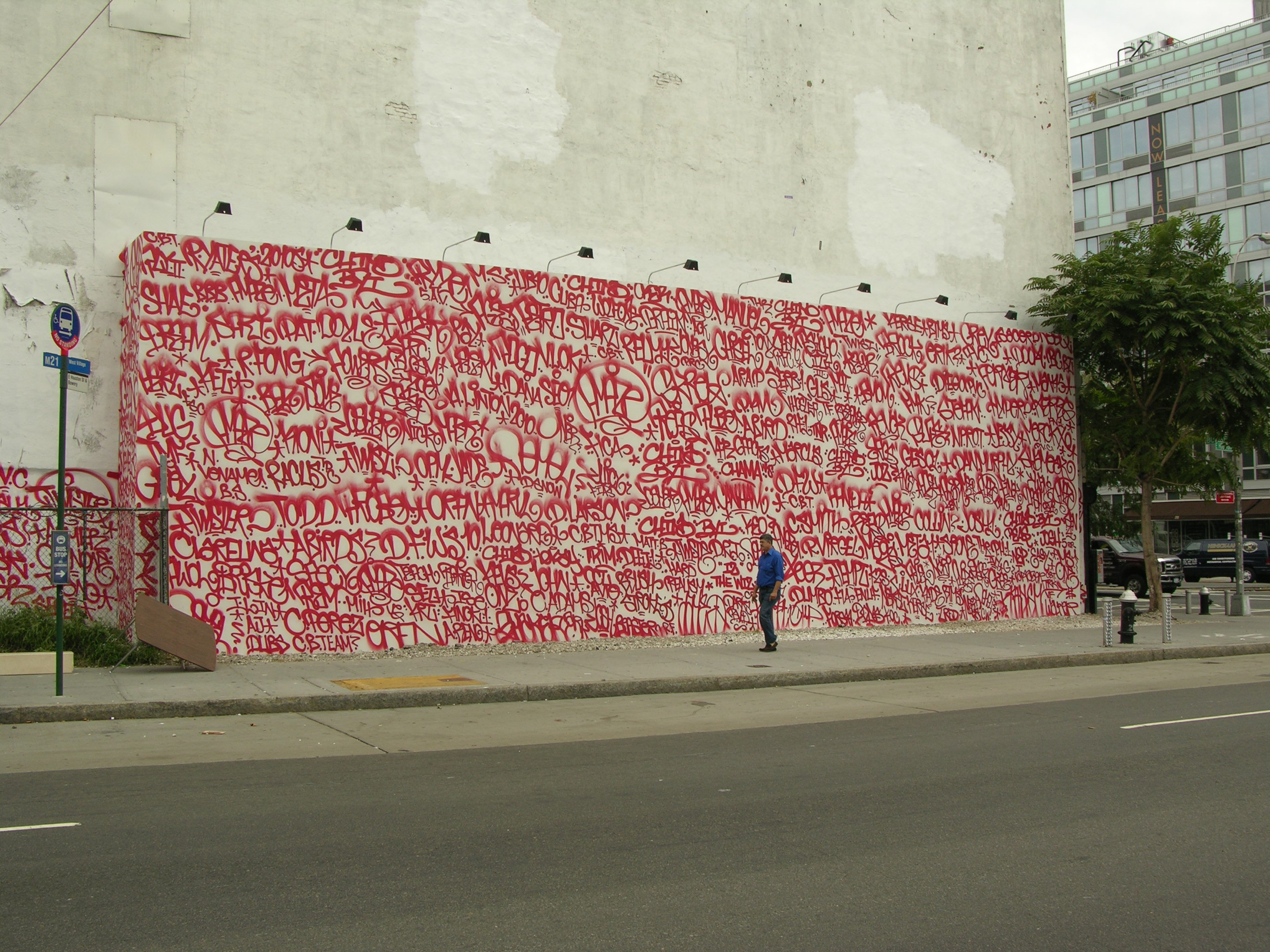
- McGee Mural on Houston and Bowery
- Born: 1966 (age 59–60); San Francisco, California, U.S.
- Education: San Francisco Art Institute
- Occupation: Visual artist
- Known for: Painting
- Movement: Mission School, street art
- Spouse(s): Margaret Kilgallen (1999–2001; death); Clare Rojas (m.2005)
- Children: 1

Barry McGee (born 1966) is an American artist. He is known for graffiti art, and for being part of the Mission School art movement. McGee is credited as contributing to bringing urban art into high-end galleries.

As an graffiti artist, McGee is known by multiple monikers: Twist, Ray Fong, Bernon Vernon, and P.Kin.

== Life and education ==
Barry McGee was born in 1966 in San Francisco, California. He is of Chinese and Irish descent. McGee's father worked at an auto body repair shop. McGee graduated from El Camino High School in South San Francisco, California.

He attended the San Francisco Art Institute, where he graduated in 1991 with a concentration in painting and printmaking.

McGee was married to the artist Margaret Kilgallen in 1999, who later died of breast cancer in 2001. They have a daughter named Asha. After Kilgallen's death, McGee married artist Clare Rojas in 2005.

== Career ==
Commissioned murals typical of Barry McGee's earlier work and graffiti in the LACMA parking garage (now torn down)

McGee was a central figure in the graffiti art scene in San Francisco from the late 1980s and into the 1990s.

As Twist, he became well known nationally by his stylized black and white pictographic flathead screw graffiti 'throw ups'.

Later he was part of a group of young, San Francisco artists known as the Mission School art movement based in the aesthetics of the Mission District of San Francisco.

His work is founded on a pessimistic view of the urban experience, which he describes as, "urban ills, over-stimulations, frustrations, addictions & trying to maintain a level head under the constant bombardment of advertising". He was also an artist in residence at inner-city McClymonds High School in Oakland, California, in the early '90s. Although his artistic origins lie in New York subway graffiti he has been included as a member of the street art movement.

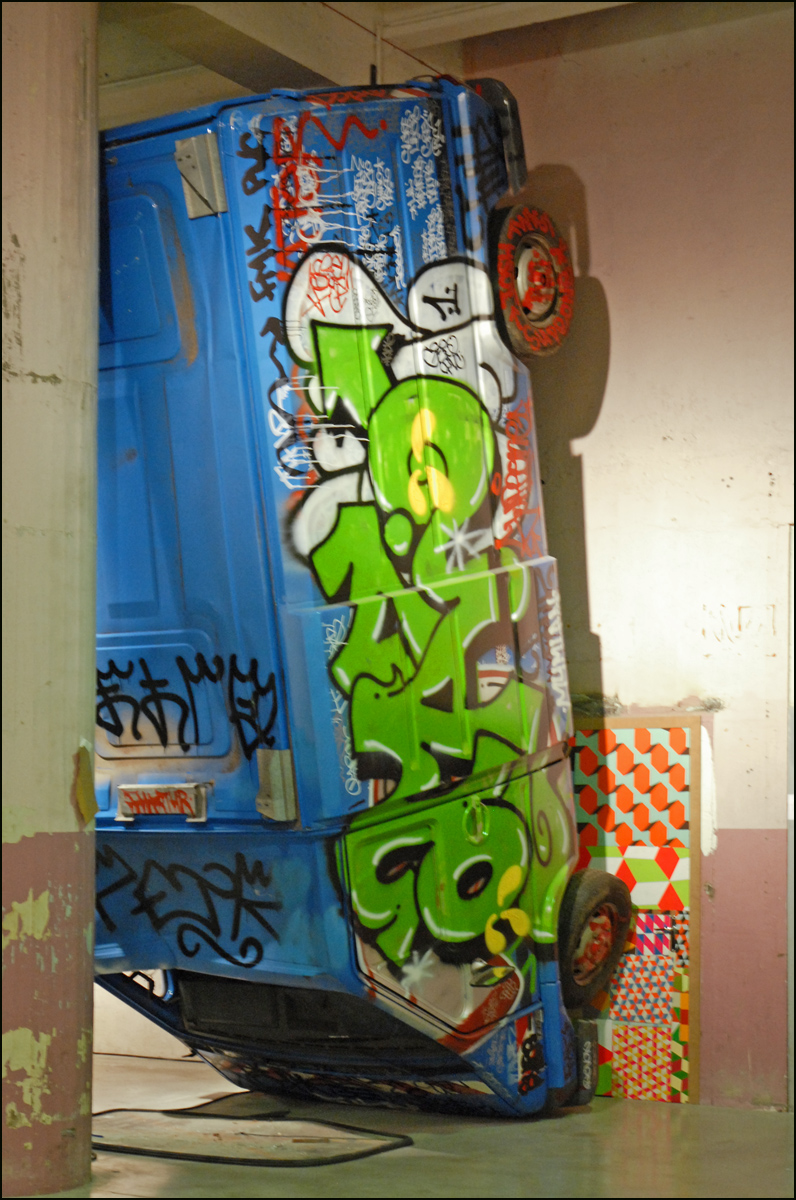
Installation, Xe Biennale de Lyon

McGee's installations consist of simple bold paintings which are influenced by Islamic patterns on tiles, vernacular sign painting, or use caricatures of the destitute. These paintings are clustered together in combination with photographs of other graffiti writers. Older work included layering of shapes, and buff marks, backgrounds of drips painted directly on the gallery wall. He has painted stylized portraits on empty bottles of liquor, flattened spray cans, and wrecked vehicles for art shows. He has collaborated frequently with Amaze, allowing him to paint the exterior and interior of the galleries exhibiting McGee's work. They have also utilized realistic moving mechanical human figures that appear to be tagging gallery walls.

The market value of his work rose considerably after 2001 as a result of his being included in the Venice Biennale and other major exhibitions. As a result, much of his San Francisco street art has been scavenged or stolen.

== Controversies ==
In September 1999, a 64-foot-long, 8-foot-high mural made up of 300 pieces, made by Barry McGee and financially sponsored by the Luggage Store Gallery and the Creative Work Fund, was stolen off a vacant commercial building in the South of Market neighborhood of San Francisco. It was never recovered.

In 2004, as part of an exhibit at San Francisco's City Hall, McGee spray-painted "Smash the State" on the walls of Supervisor Matt Gonzalez's office. SFGate wrote: "The timing and placement of the artwork are interesting, seeing how City Hall is a registered historical landmark, and you need approval just to hang a bulletin board". Gonzalez told the press that he knew his office would be repainted for the next occupant.

McGee was involved in a controversy regarding the Adidas Y1 HUF, a shoe for which he provided the artwork. This gave rise to a protest campaign by some Asian-Americans who claimed that the picture on the shoe's tongue depicts a racist stereotype. McGee responded to the controversy in a March 2006 press release. He stated that the drawing was a portrait of himself as an 8-year-old child.

== Selected exhibitions ==
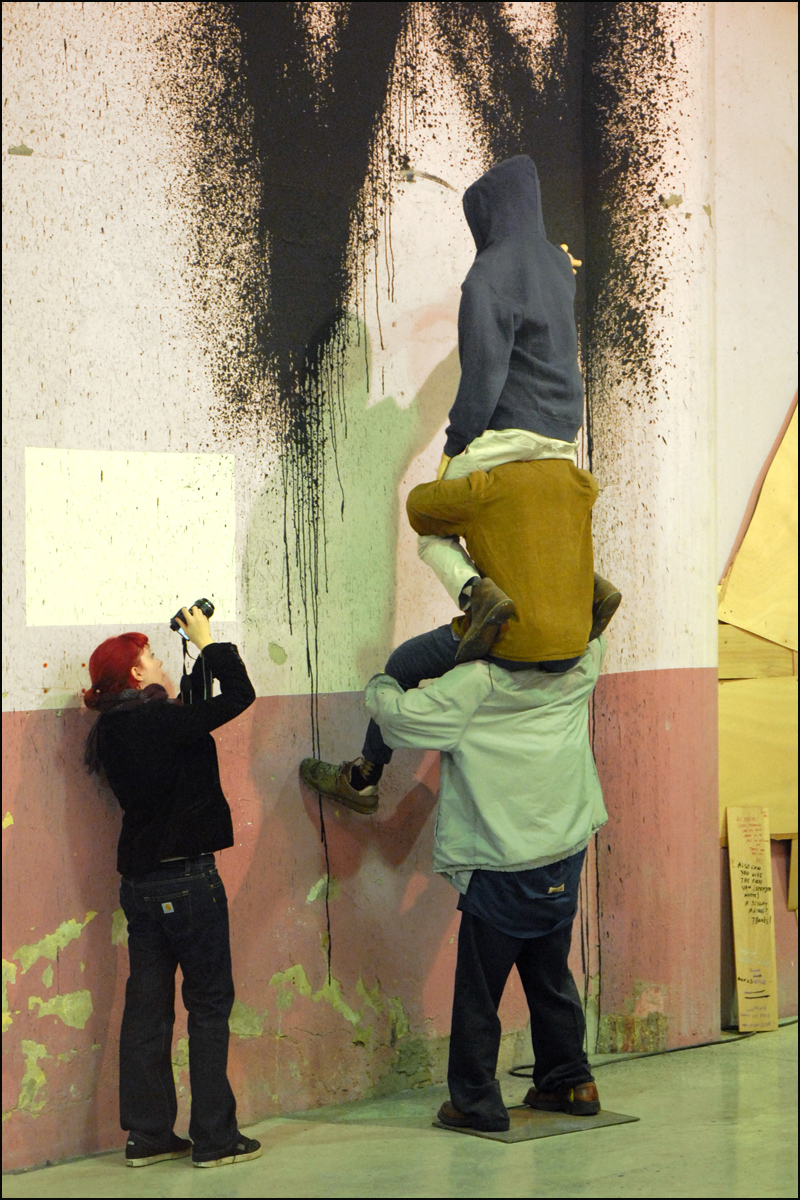
Woman photographing a Barry McGee installation, Xe Biennale de Lyon

- 1999: The Buddy System, Deitch Gallery in New York City, NYC
- 1999: HOSS, Rice Gallery in Houston, TX
- 2001: with Todd James, and Stephen Powers, Venice Biennale
- 2004: Barry McGee and Josh Lazcano, Gallery Paule Anglim in San Francisco, CA
- 2004: Rose Art Museum
- 2006: Featured in Beautiful Losers exhibition at Circleculture Gallery in Berlin, Germany
- 2006–2007: LOFT installation at Roberts & Tilton Gallery in Los Angeles, CA
- 2007: Watari Museum of Contemporary Art
- 2008: Baltic Centre for Contemporary Art
- 2008: The Big Sad (With Clare Rojas), Riverside Art Museum
- 2008: Life on Mars Carnegie International
- 2008: Ratio 3 in San Francisco, CA
- 2009: McGee / Templeton / Pettibon exhibition curated by Aaron Rose at Circleculture Gallery in Berlin, Germany
- 2009–2010: Biennale de Lyon, France
- 2010: The Last Night (With HuskMitNavn), A.L.I.C.E. gallery in Brussels, Belgium
- 2012: Retrospective at the Berkeley Art Museum
- 2019: The Other Side, solo show, Perrotin Gallery, Hong Kong
- 2021: Fuzz Gathering, solo show, Galerie Perrotin, Paris
- 2022: Everyday Sunrise, solo show, Perrotin, Seoul
- 2024: Old Mystified, solo show, Berggruen, San Francisco

== See also ==
- Beautiful Losers
- Mission School
- Lowbrow (art movement)
- Piece by Piece

== Bibliography ==
- McGee, Barry, Ellen Robinson, and Katya Tylevich. Barry McGee. Bologna: Damiani, (2018). ISBN 978-8862086165
- Boas, Natasha. Energy that is all around: Mission School: Chris Johanson, Margaret Kilgallen, Alicia McCarthy, Barry McGee, Ruby Neri. San Francisco: San Francisco Art Institute Chronicle Books, (2014). ISBN 978-1452142180
- Rinder, Lawrence, and Barry McGee. Barry McGee. Berkeley & New York: University of California, Berkeley Art Museum and Pacific Film Archive D.A.P./Distributed Art Publishers, Inc, (2012). ISBN 978-1935202851
- Rose, Aaron (editor), Barry McGee . Tokyo: Damiani, (2010). ISBN 978-8862080965
- Kilgallen, Margaret, et al. Margaret kilgallen : in the sweet bye & bye. Los Angeles: California Institute of the Arts/REDCAT, (2006). ISBN 978-0974983165
- Bertelli, Patrizio, Barry McGee. Fondazione Prada, (2002). ISBN 978-8887029215
- Kawachi, Taka, Street Market: Barry McGee, Stephen Powers, Todd James. Little More, (2000). ISBN 978-4898150399

== Bibliography ==
- Barry McGee. 2002. Barry McGee: The Buddy System. ISBN 0-9648530-3-5
- Barry McGee, Germano Celant, Prada. 2003. Barry McGee. ISBN 88-87029-21-0
- Aaron Rose and Christian Strike (editors). 2004. Beautiful Losers: Contemporary Art and Street Culture. ISBN 1-891024-74-4
