= Margaret Kilgallen =

American artist (1967–2001)

- Born: Margaret Leisha Kilgallen; October 28, 1967; Washington, D.C.
- Died: June 26, 2001 (aged 33); San Francisco, California
- Education: Colorado College (BFA, 1989), Stanford University (MFA, 2001)
- Known for: Painting, printmaking, and graffiti
- Movement: Mission School
- Awards: San Francisco Arts Commission – Individual Grant: Cultural Equity (1997); Fleishhacker Foundation – Eureka Fellowship (1998)

Margaret Leisha Kilgallen (October 28, 1967 – June 26, 2001) was a San Francisco Bay Area artist who combined graffiti art, painting, and installation art. Though a contemporary artist, her work showed a strong influence from folk art. She was considered a central figure in the Bay Area Mission School art movement.

== Life and career ==
Kilgallen was born in Washington, D.C., and grew up nearby in Kensington, Maryland. Hearing and liking bluegrass music as a child, Kilgallen became an accomplished banjo player. Kilgallen herself described a personal interest in old-time music. She received a BFA in studio art and printmaking from Colorado College in 1989. After moving to San Francisco, she took up surfing, and in 1990 met her future husband Barry McGee, who was also a surfer. After her time at Colorado College, Kilgallen had a few solo exhibitions in New York and California in the years 1997 to 1999. She also received a MFA from Stanford University in 2001.

In the fall of 1999 she was diagnosed with breast cancer, and had a mastectomy. She opted to forgo chemotherapy. Her doctor didn't disagree with this decision, because with chemotherapy she would decrease her risk of a recurrence within five years by just 2 or 3 percent. After regular follow-up visits, she was given a clean bill of health. During her pregnancy, however, she learned that the cancer had returned and had metastasized to her liver. Asha, her daughter with her husband and collaborator Barry McGee, was born healthy but six weeks early on June 7, 2001, almost three weeks before Kilgallen's death at age 33.

During the last months of her life she continued to work on art that would later be displayed in galleries after her death. Kilgallen has since been the subject of several posthumous retrospectives.

Mural, LACMA parking garage, now torn down, by Kilgallen (2000)

Kilgallen's first major group exhibitions appeared in 1997 and included the first Bay Area Now show at Yerba Buena Center for the Arts. This was followed by a solo exhibition, Three Sheets to the Wind, at The Drawing Center in New York City in 1997. In 1998, Kilgallen had another solo exhibition, Sincere Sin, at the John Berggruen Gallery in San Francisco, CA. Following that exhibition, Kilgallen had two more solo exhibitions before her death in 2001. These two galleries were her 1999 To Friend and Foe, Deitch Projects, in New York, NY, and in 2000 her solo exhibition Hammer Projects: Margaret Kilgallen, in the UCLA Hammer Museum, Los Angeles, CA. A number of major exhibitions took place after her death. In 2002, her work was chosen for that year's Whitney Biennial. In 2005, a survey of her work titled, In the Sweet Bye & Bye, was shown at the Gallery at REDCAT. Her work was also an important part of the 2004–2006 touring exhibit, Beautiful Losers: Contemporary Art and Street Culture. In 2011, Kilgallen's Summer Selections exhibit was shown in the Ratio 3 gallery in San Francisco, CA. Through Jan 12-Jun 16, 2019, the Aspen Art Museum is showing Margaret Kilgallen: That's Where the Beauty is, a survey of her work from 1997 to 2001.

Other galleries that have exhibited her work include the Luggage Store Gallery in San Francisco; Gallery 16 in San Francisco; Forum for Contemporary Art in St. Louis; the Institute of Contemporary Art in Philadelphia; the Bonnefanten Museum in Maastricht, and the Geffen Contemporary at the Museum of Contemporary Art in Los Angeles.

== Influences ==
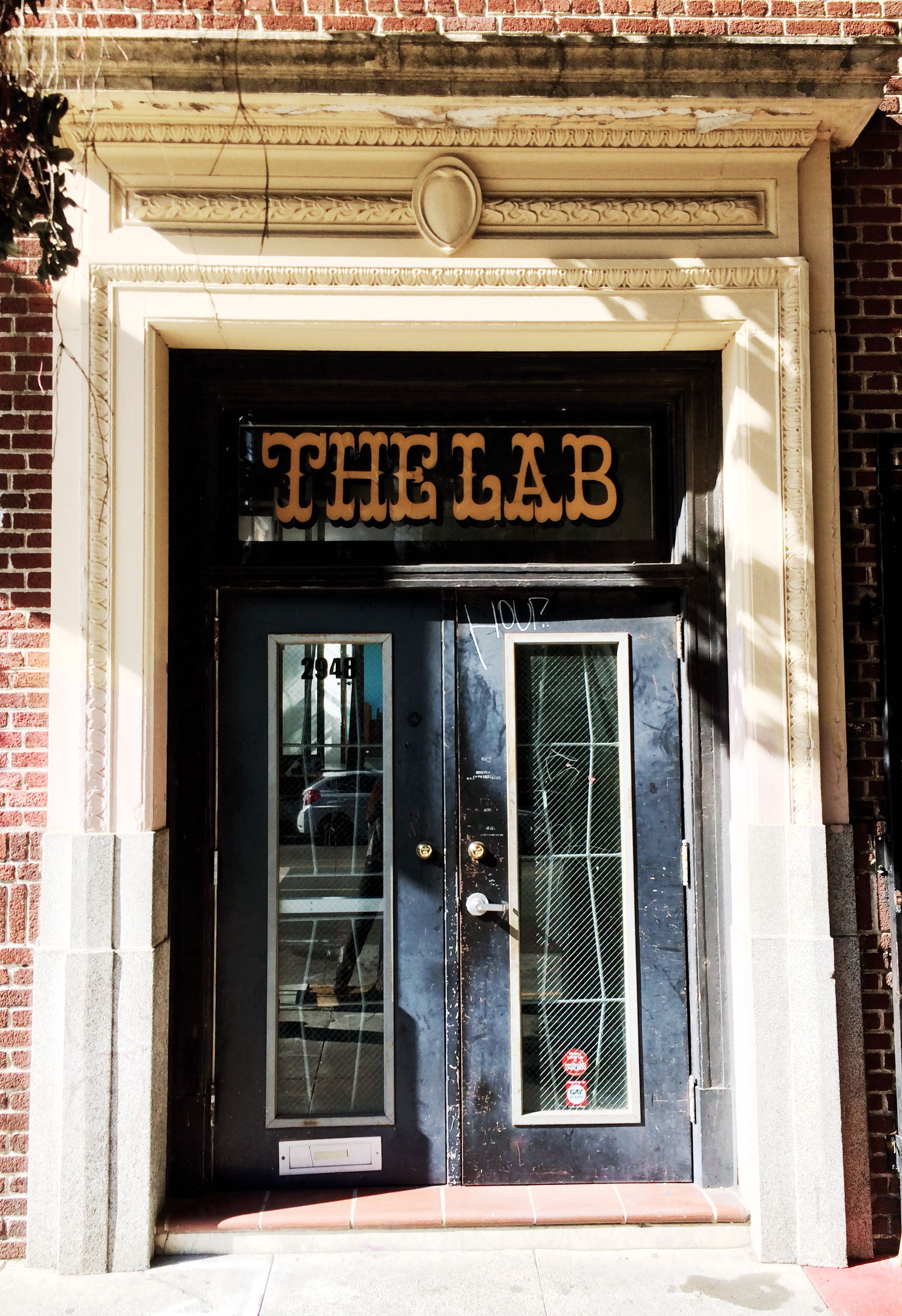
The Lab's facade, with signage painted by Margaret Kilgallen

Kilgallen looked to Appalachian music, the murals of San Francisco's Mission District, letterpress printing, American folk signs, freight train graffiti art, and religious and decorative arts to inform her work.

== Work ==
Kilgallen's paintings and murals reflect a variety of influences, including hand-painted signs, elements of American folk art, mural painting, and a variety of formal painting strategies. At an early age, she was impressed by examples of works by Southwestern and Mexican artists, and she employed these artists' use of warm colors in her own painting. Her many works in gouache, acrylic, and randomly-mixed and recycled house paints on found paper (often discarded book endpapers), reflect an interest in typographic styles and symbology that can be traced to her work as a book conservator with Dan Flanagan at the San Francisco Public Library in the early to mid-1990s. Kilgallen rendered all her work by hand without preparatory drawings or masking tape in order to express the handmade quality of each piece. Her paintings showcase women engaging in a variety of everyday activities that include biking and surfing. In addition to her commissioned mural work, Kilgallen was also a graffiti artist under the tag names "Meta" and "Matokie Slaughter." The latter name, an homage to folk musician Matokie Slaughter, was specifically used for freight train graffiti. In addition to Kilgallen’s work, she also displayed themes of nostalgia as an important part of her artistic expression that revolved around sentimental values, and a person's sense of close solidarity within a community. This was based on Kilgallen’s real life values which established the idea of togetherness providing an element of belonging rather than isolation.

== List of work ==
List of Artwork (1998 to 2000)
Gallery/Personal Collection	Name	Date	Dimensions	Medium
Paulson Bott Press, Berkeley	Sloe	1998	36 x 24 1/2 inches	Color etching on soft white paper
Deitch Projects, New York	To Friend and Foe	1999	Variable	Mixed Media
Paulson Bott Press, Berkeley	Linda Mar	1999	26 x 19 inches	Color and sugarlift etching on soft white paper
Paulson Bott Press, Berkeley	Pilar	1999	23 x 18 inches	Color etching on soft white paper
Paulson Bott Press, Berkeley	Untitiled	1999	31 x 54 inches	Sugarlift etching on soft white paper
Ratio 3, San Francisco	Untitled	1999	17 1/4 x 7 1/2 inches	Acrylic on wood
Courtesy the Artists	Hand-painted trainyard photo	2000	Variable	Photograph with paint
Ratio 3, San Francisco	Untitled	2000	13 1/4 x 12 inches	Acrylic on paper
Ratio 3, San Francisco	Untitled	2000	26 1/2 x 33 inches	Acrylic on canvas
