= Chris Johanson =

American painter

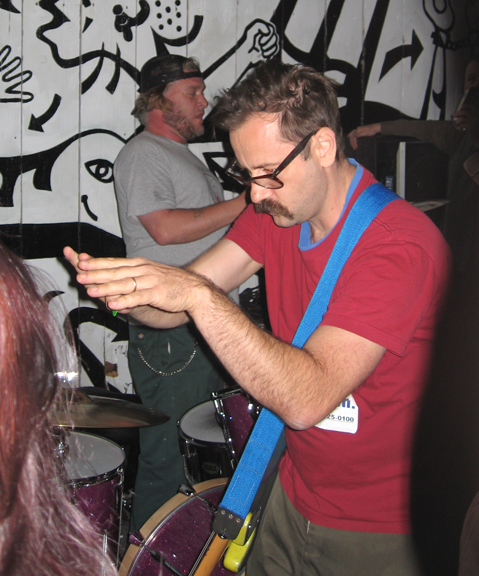
- Chris Johanson playing in Tina Age 13 at the Clarion Alley Block Party, San Francisco, 2007
- Born: 1968 (age 57–58); San Jose, California
- Known for: Graffiti, murals, sculpture, installation art, anda painting
- Movement: Mission School
- Awards: Whitney Biennial exhibition, SFMOMA SECA Art Award

Chris Johanson is an American painter and street artist. He is a member of San Francisco's Mission School art movement.

== Biography ==
Johanson was born in suburban San Jose, California in 1968. He grew up skateboarding, attending punk rock shows, drawing, and with a dry yet sharp sense of humor. He has no formal training in art, learning some technique by painting skateboards and houses. He was a prominent 'zine artist, and his publication "Karmaboarder," a skateboarding and art zine he published in the early to late 1980s, helped shape what later became initial well-known works.

He moved to San Francisco, California's Mission District in 1989, where he became a member of the local art community, initially drawing cartoons on lampposts and bathroom walls using black Sharpies. From 1989 until 1992, Johanson attended City College of San Francisco. In 1994, Johanson did one of the initial board graphic runs for a new San Francisco-based skateboard brand, Anti-Hero, which brought his art to a wider audience. Also, during this time, he played in a band called "Tina, Age 13," which was scrawled on a drawing the band came across randomly. The band toured several times, and record numerous 7" records, an EP called "The Alcoholic Father of My Inner Child," and a full-length LP, "Good Feelings," for Goldenrod Records, which remained unreleased until the late 2000s. In 2004 he and Jo Jackson, an artist and his wife, moved to and bought a home in Portland, Oregon.

Johanson achieved international fame after participating in 2002 Whitney Biennial exhibition. The next year he was one of winners of the San Francisco Museum of Modern Art's SECA Art Award."

== Works ==
Aquatint from portfolio Everything that happens is because of the sun, 2002, Honolulu Museum of Art

Johanson's works, involving expressing urban themes through found and recycled materials and graffiti, are a response to his suburban childhood. Johanson has made a number of site installations, and prefers to work in that medium. The illustration from his portfolio Everything that happens is because of the sun, from 2002, in the collection of the Honolulu Museum of Art is an example of how the artist marries text with cartoon images. Like much of the artist's work, the message is up-lifting.

== Bibliography ==
- Chris Johanson: Please Listen I Have Something to Tell You About What Is by Aaron Rose, Sean Kennerly and Jack Hanley, Damiani, Bologna, 2007
- Peaceable Kingdom by Chris Johanson and Johanna Jackson, Nieves, Zurich, 2008
- Chris Johanson: Totalities by Arty Nelson and Chris Johanson, Deitch Projects, New York, 2010
- Chris Johanson by Bob Nickas, Corrina Peipon, Julie Deamer and Jonathan Raymond, Phaidon, London, 2013
