= Megan Wilson =

American visual artist, writer, & activist (born 1969)

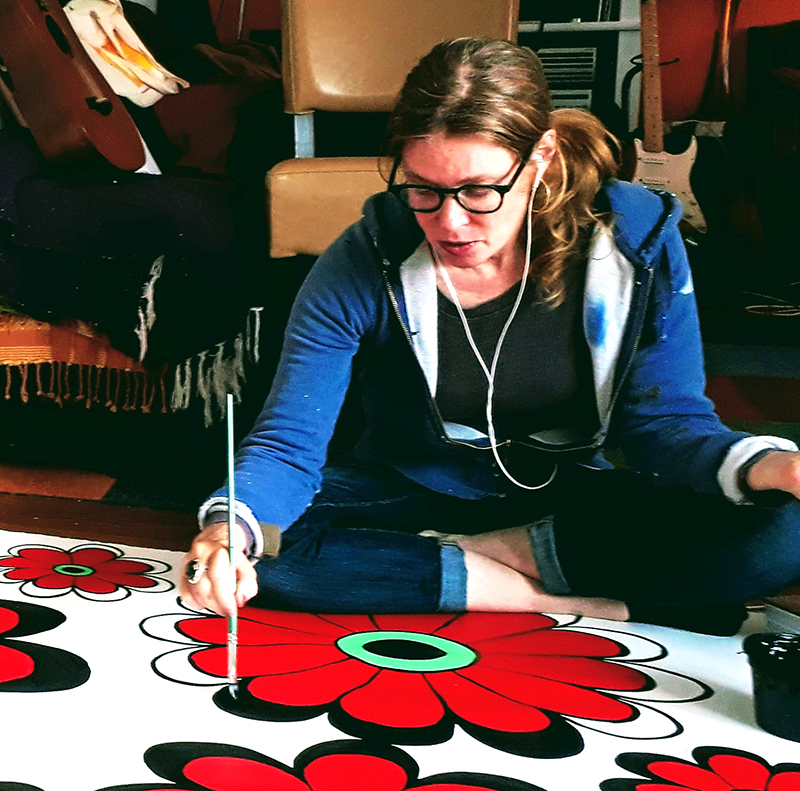
- Born: 1969 (age 56–57); Billings, Montana, U.S.
- Education: MFA San Francisco Art Institute, BFA University of Oregon
- Known for: Street art, conceptual art, installation art, public art, quilling
- Awards: Gunk Foundation, Artadia, Asian Cultural Council, The San Francisco Foundation, Ford Foundation, Penny Stamps Distinguished Speaker Series, San Francisco Art Commission Individual Artist Award, Zellerbach Family Foundation

Megan Wilson (born 1969) is an American visual artist, writer, and activist based in San Francisco. Known for her large-scale installations, public projects, and street art, she incorporates a broad range of pop culture methodologies and aesthetics to address conceptual interests that include home, homelessness, social and economic justice, anti-capitalism, impermanence and generosity. Wilson's art practice is influenced by Buddhism and Vipassanā meditation, often creating work that is conceptually rooted in elements of these practices and that is intentionally ephemeral or given away.

== Biography ==
Megan Wilson was born and raised in Montana. Her father was an oil and gas attorney and partner with the Crowley, Haughey, Hanson, Toole and Dietrich firm in Billings, Montana for over 30 years until he left in 2002 to serve as Carbon County Attorney prior to his death in 2008. Her mother was Canadian and worked as an ophthalmic technician; she died in 2015. Wilson's parents lived in San Francisco in the sixties where her father clerked for Judge James R. Browning of the United States Court of Appeals for the Ninth Circuit. Wilson moved out at the age of 16 and worked at Burger King her senior year of high school to support herself. She received her BFA from the University of Oregon in 1992 and her MFA from the San Francisco Art Institute in 1997. She has taught at the San Francisco Art Institute and the California College of the Arts.

== Projects ==
=== Better Homes & Gardens Today ===
Wilson and collaborator Christopher Statton launched the public project Better Homes & Gardens Today in fall 2014, creating a limited edition of 300 pairs of hand-painted signs with the word “Home” in different languages accompanied by a flower. Wilson and Statton state the project's goals to: “1) Heighten awareness around 'home' and the realities of homelessness; 2) Cultivate a dialog within communities and amongst disparate groups – especially with those in the tech sector who are having a significant impact on housing instability in the Bay Area - about the funding and policy change that is needed to help end homelessness; and 3) To raise money to benefit the Gubbio Project, the Coalition on Homelessness, San Francisco, and At The Crossroads, organizations working to address homelessness in San Francisco.” "Better Homes & Gardens Today" was included in the exhibition "Street Messages" at Lazarides Gallery in London as part of the launch of the book "Street Messages, edited by Nicholas Ganz.

Better Homes & Gardens Today is an extension of Wilson’s project Better Homes & Gardens from 2000 through which she gave 250 of the signs out for free to the homeless and those facing eviction in San Francisco during the area’s first Dot-com bubble. The project is included in the book San Francisco Museum of Modern Art 75 Years of Looking Forward, and in the exhibition Fertile Ground at the Oakland Museum in 2014/15.

=== Clarion Alley Mural Project ===
Wilson's social practice work includes acting as a primary organizer and curator of the volunteer-run collective Clarion Alley Mural Project since 1998. She is currently the organization's Board President. As part of the project she’s painted nine murals on the alley: Home/Casa (2000), featured in the book Street Art San Francisco Mission Muralismo edited by Annice Jacoby; CAPITALISM IS OVER! If You Want It (2011), featured in the book Street Messages by Nicholas Ganz and the book Capitalism On Edge by Albena Azmenova; TAX THE RICH (2013), also featured in the books Street Messages and Capitalism On Edge, Viva La Tamale Lady (2013), a collaboration with Jet Martinez, The Wall of Shame & Solutions (2014), a collaboration with Christopher Statton and Mike Reger to call out San Francisco's city government officials on policies impacting the city's changing character, Housing Is A Human Right (2015), Stop The Corporatocracy (2015), Housing Is A Human Right (2016), featured in the book Urban Scrawl: The Written Word in Street Art by Lou Chamberlin and End Apartheid B.D.S. (2018).

In 2015 Wilson and Statton were invited to participate in the Geneng Street Art Project in Yogyakarta Indonesia, organized by Ruang Kelas SD. The theme of the project was "Gemah Ripah Loh Jinawi," which translates to a critique of the unprecedented levels of development and displacement, impacting farmers and the natural resources in the areas surrounding the city of Yogyakarta. Wilson and Statton were two of the 30+ artists to paint murals on the facades of the homes in the farming community of Sewon.

In 2016 Wilson designed and produced the organization's first Website, www.ClarionAlleyMuralProject.org with technical support from Web developer Ari Salomon.

Wilson's mural CAPITALISM IS OVER! If You Want It was used without the artist's permission in the film About Cherry, directed by Stephen Elliott (author), starring Ashley Hinshaw and James Franco.

=== CAPITALISM IS OVER! If You Want It ===
Wilson co-founded (with Amy Berk, Andy Cox, Cheryl Meeker, Eliza Barrios, and Maw Shein Win) Capitalism Is Over! If Your Want It, a collective of artists from around the world who have created artistic actions in response to the impact of capitalism on the global economy.

=== Home 1996-2008 ===
Inspired in part by artist David Ireland (artist), Wilson transformed her home from 2004 - 2008 into an installation that she opened up to the public in 2008 that included a series of dinner salons, curated events, and public video projections.

=== Sama-Sama/Together ===
Wilson curated, directed, and raised the funds for Sama-Sama/Together, the first international mural exchange between artists in the United States (San Francisco) and Yogyakarta Indonesia. Wilson co-organized the project with Apotik Komik of Indonesia and Intersection for the Arts. Artists from San Francisco included: Aaron Noble, Alicia McCarthy, Andrew Schoultz, Carolyn Castaño, Carolyn Ryder Cooley, and Wilson. Artists from Indonesia included: Arie Dyanto, Arya Panjalu, Nano Warsono, and Samuel Indratma. The project was the catalyst for the mural and graffiti movement in Yogyakarta. The San Francisco Bay Guardian awarded the project “The Best Transnational Art Undertaking” in 2004.

=== Flower Interruption ===
In 2002/03 Wilson launched a four-part public installation series through which she filled traffic intersections in San Francisco, Tokyo, Yogyakarta and Ubud Indonesia with giant “Technicolor flowers” that passersby were invited to take for free.

In 2017 Wilson was one of six contemporary artists to be featured in the Asian Art Museum of San Francisco's exhibition "Flower Power" as part of the 50th Anniversary of the Summer of Love. Wilson created a series of new "Flower Interruptions" inside the Museum, around the grounds of the Civic Center, San Francisco, and at satellite sites throughout San Francisco, including the Haight neighborhood, the Roxie Theater, Artists' Television Access (ATA), and Clarion Alley Mural Project.

=== Bangkit/Arise ===
In 2018 Wilson co-curated and co-directed Bangkit/Arise with Nano Warsono and Christopher Statton as part of Clarion Alley Mural Project and in collaboration with the Asian Art Museum (San_Francisco). Bangkit/Arise is the second international exchange and residency between artists in the United States (San Francisco) and Yogyakarta, Indonesia that Wilson has co-produced and participated in. Artists from San Francisco include Christopher Statton, Kelly Ording, Jet Martinez, Shaghayegh Cyrous, Keyvan Shovir, Jose Guerra Awe, and Wilson. Artists from Yogyakarta include: Nano Warsono, Bambang Toko, Ucup, Wedhar Riyadi, Vina Puspita, and Harind Arvati. The project was designed to address critical issues facing global and local communities, such as community development, land use, environmental crises, housing instability, and geopolitical divisions, using art as a point of departure. Community partners included the village of Panggunharjo, the Institut Seni Indonesia, AROC (Arab Resource and Organizing Center), Coalition on Homelessness, San Francisco, and SOMCAN (South of Market Community Action Network).

=== Non-traditional mural installations ===
Wilson has created a series of non-traditional mural installations using textiles and quilling at venues including the Sun Valley Center for the Arts in Idaho, Thirtyninehotel in Honolulu, HI, Yerba Buena Center for the Arts in San Francisco, and the Museum of Craft and Folk Art in San Francisco. She is one of the first artists to use quilling as a contemporary art form outside of its historical use as a decorative craft on paper or household objects.

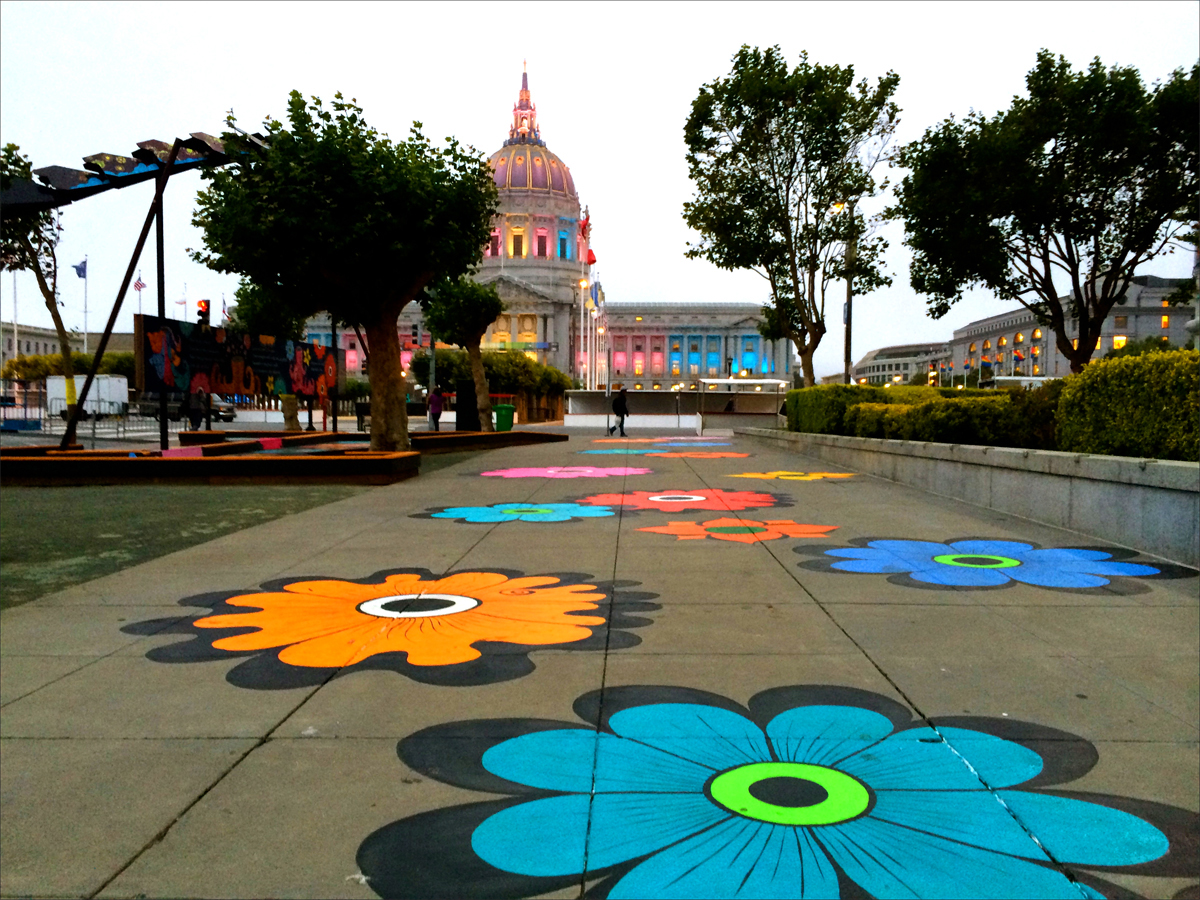
Megan Wilson's "Flower Interruption," Asian Art Museum of San Francisco, Civic Center Commons, 2017

== Exhibitions ==
Wilson's work has been exhibited at the Asian Art Museum of San Francisco, Oakland Museum, Museum of Craft and Folk Art (S.F.), Yerba Buena Center for the Arts, the San Francisco Museum of Modern Art, Lazarides Gallery (London UK), Pop Up (Dortmund Germany), Southern Exposure (art space), Montalvo Art Center, Intersection for the Arts, The Luggage Store, the San Francisco Arts Commission, Sun Valley Center for the Arts (ID), Stephen Wirtz Gallery (S.F.) Tinlark Gallery (Los Angeles, CA) thirtyninehotel(Honolulu, HI), Green Papaya (Manila), Print It! (Barcelona), and LIP (Yogyakarta). She has created public projects in the San Francisco Bay Area, Civic Center, San Francisco, Tokyo, Japan; Yogyakarta & Bali, Indonesia; Jaipur, India, and Manila Philippines.

== Publications ==
Wilson's work is included in: Are We The 99%? by Dr.Heather McKee Hurwitz, Temple University Press; Capitalism On Edge by Dr. Albena Azmenova, Columbia University Press; Urban Scrawl: The Written Word in Street Art by Lou Chamberlin; Flower Power: The Meaning of Flowers in Asian Art by Dany Chan with foreword by Jay Xu; Public Works: Artists’ Interventions 1970s – Now edited by Christian L. Frock and Tanya Zimbardo; Street Messages by Nicholas Ganz /Dokument Press; FRESH 1: Cutting Edge Illustrations in 3D and FRESH 2: Cutting Edge Illustrations in Public edited by Slanted; San Francisco Museum of Modern Art 75 Years of Looking Forward, edited by Janet Bishop, Corey Keller, Sarah Roberts; Street Art San Francisco Mission Muralismo, edited by Annice Jacoby; Mural Art: Murals on Huge Public Surfaces Around the World by Kirakoss Iosifidis; Illustration: Play - Craving for the Extraordinary, Published by Victionary; Sama-Sama/Together: An International Exchange Project Between Yogyakarta and San Francisco, Published by Jam Karet; and The Gallery at Villa Montalvo: Selected Exhibitions from 1996-2000, edited by Theres Rohan.

== Published writings ==
Wilson is also a writer and art critic. She co-founded the San Francisco-based arts Website www.stretcher.org. She was an art writer for the San Francisco Bay Guardian 2000 - 2001. Her writings have appeared in stretcher.org, afterimage, Up The Staircase Quarterly, Digitalcity, Public Art Review, Art Practical, El_Tecolote_(newspaper); in the book Street Art San Francisco Mission Muralismo (edited by Annice Jacoby with Foreword by Carlos Santana); and in Reimagine: The National Journal About Race, Poverty, and the Environment.

== Activism ==
Wilson has been one of the core organizers active in the response to San Francisco's economic and technology booms 1999–present. In 2000, she co-organized the project Art Strikes Back with Lise Swenson, an 8-week series of performances along the Valencia corridor in San Francisco's Mission District. In 2014 she called out University of Berkeley's Graduate School of Journalism's project "Mission Loc@l" for disrespecting the wishes of artists involved with the Clarion Alley Mural Project by selecting an image of the Alley for their contest to decorate the highly contested "tech buses" that use the city's public bus stops. The winning artist, Elinor Diamond, ultimately withdrew the image and submitted a new one. Wilson and artists Christopher Statton, and Mike Reger created the mural Wall of Shame & Solutions on the Clarion Alley to call out San Francisco's city government officials on policies impacting the city's changing character. Wilson's essay “The Gentrification of Our Livelihoods” published on Stretcher.org in June 2014 and in Reimagine: The National Journal About Race, Poverty, and the Environment in December 2014, looks at the impact that public-private partnerships between arts organizations, developers, and funders have had on the arts and greater communities of San Francisco.

== Personal ==
Wilson lives in San Francisco with her husband and sometime collaborator Christopher Statton.
