= Redstone Building =

The Redstone Building
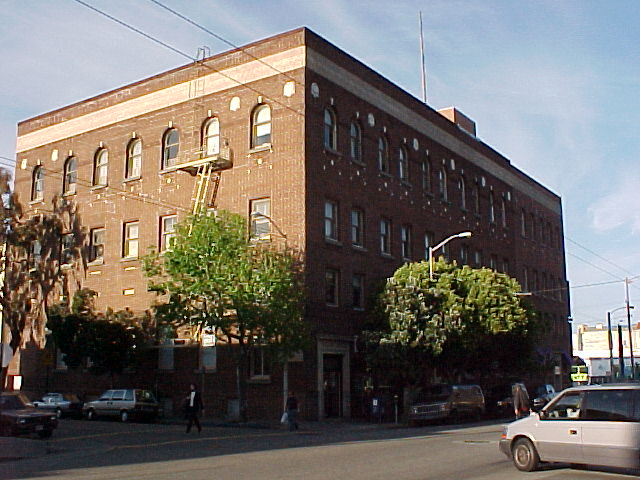
- The San Francisco Labor Temple known today as the Redstone Building

- Location within San Francisco County Location within California Location within the United States

General information
- Status: Completed
- Type: offices and community center
- Location: 2926-48 16th Street; San Francisco
- Coordinates: 37°45′55.34″N 122°25′5.66″W
- Construction started: 1914
- Completed: 1915
- Opening: 1915
- Renovated: 1939 (addition)
- Cost: USD $150,000
- Owner: David Luchessi

Technical details
- Structural system: Steel-reinforced brick facade
- Floor count: 3
- Floor area: 50,000 square feet (4,600 m^{2})
- Lifts/elevators: 1

Design and construction
- Architect: Matthew O'Brien
- Main contractor: New Wing – Moore & Roberts

San Francisco Designated Landmark
- Designated: 2004
- Reference no.: 238

The Redstone Building, also known as the Redstone Labor Temple (and formerly called "The San Francisco Labor Temple"), was constructed and operated by the San Francisco Labor Council Hall Associates. Initial planning started in 1910, with most construction work done during 1914. Its primary tenant was the San Francisco Labor Council, including 22 labor union offices as well as meeting halls. The building was a hub of union organizing and work activities and a "primary center for the city's historic labor community for over half a century."

The Redstone building played a significant role in the 1917 United Railroads Streetcar Strike as well as the San Francisco maritime strike that led to the 1934 San Francisco General Strike. The Redstone Building has been designated San Francisco's 238th landmark.

The Redstone is located at 2940 16th Street between South Van Ness, formerly Howard Street, and Capp.

== San Francisco Labor Temple ==
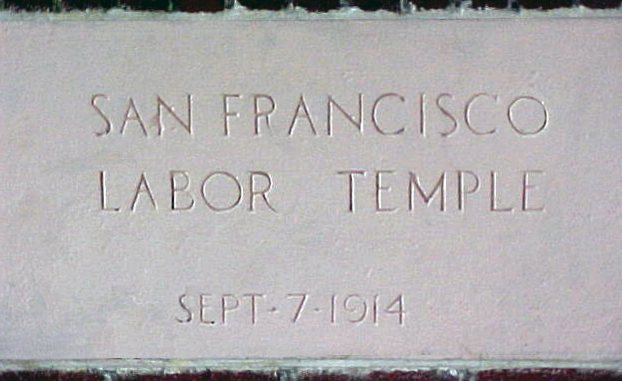
Cornerstone

The San Francisco Labor Temple was dedicated on September 7, 1914, by former San Francisco mayor and head of the local Building Trades Council P.H. McCarthy. The cornerstone was set by A.J Gallagaher. The San Francisco Labor Council held a grand opening for the Labor Temple on February 27, 1915. The SF Labor Council newspaper, the Labor Clarion, described the building on the front page of its newspaper on February 26, 1915. The article described the building interior and gave details such as the $150,000 construction cost. The building included 22 office spaces, a number of large halls, and the 70-by-62-foot (21 by 19 m) main auditorium. The building would have its own medical and dental clinic. One of the first steel frame buildings erected in San Francisco, the building is steel reinforced with a brick facade on two sides and masonry on the other. A new wing to the building was added in 1939 at a cost of $92,000.

== Transition into a community center ==
On April 5, 1966, Dow Wilson, the secretary of the Brotherhood of Painters, Decorators and Paperhangers' San Francisco Local 4 was killed around the corner from the building in a corruption dispute. His murder led to the building being sold to Peter Blasko for $228,000. The sale helped SFLC pay off their outstanding loan. They continued to lease space as did other unions after the murder of Wilson. Blasko later sold the property to the M.K Blake Estate which held the building until 1989. By this time the building had become a community center.

The Mission District, which used to be predominantly Irish and working class, had been shifting towards a predominantly Latino community. By the early 1980s the building would be leased to mostly Latino organizations with a couple labor organizations, American Federation of Teachers Local 2121 (until 1996), which represented teachers at San Francisco City College and AFSCME Local 1650.

== Theater Rhinoceros: 1981–2009 ==
Theatre Rhinoceros or The Rhino, was established in 1977 to produce original LGBT live theater to explore "the ordinary and extraordinary aspects of our queer community" moved into the Redstone in 1981. The Rhino was the first gay theatre to receive funding from the National Endowment for the Arts and is the "world’s oldest and longest-running queer theatre" and was the Redstone's 2nd oldest and largest tenant producing "an unparalleled amount of original work" shown in The Rhino's two theaters. The Rhino's marquee and box office were at the Redstone's north entrance. After 5 years of major rent increases Rhino left the building on June 30, 2009.

== Murals ==
The Clarion Alley Mural Project (CAMP), named after their first mural project on Clarion Alley (between 17th and 18th Streets near Mission Street) and The LAB announced the mural project to the tenants on April 19, 1996, after getting tentative support from the Redstone Building Manager. The LAB was awarded a grant from the Mayor's Office to cover artist fees and expenses for the mural project, and for the design and installation of a handicapped lift, to allow access to the entertainment venues The Lab and Theater Rhinoceros.

CAMP members spent several months researching the history of the building at San Francisco State University's Labor Archives. They followed this up with surveys to all of the Redstone Building tenants, followed by several meetings, including the first one with tenants on June 19, 1996. Working color sketches were supposed to be presented to tenants on September 3, 1996, but delayed until October 25, 1996. The sketches were then taken to the Building owner who gave permission to begin painting the murals. The initial phase of the CAMP project was made up of nine artists: Carolyn Castano, John Fadeff, Susan Greene (a Redstone tenant), Barry McGee, Ruby Neri, Sebastiani Pastor, Rigo '96, Lilly Rodriguez, Chuck Sperry and Project Director Aaron Noble. The project outreach coordinator was Mary Newson with the Lab's Laura Brun coordinating the administration of the city grant, which was part of the original $1.8 million Mission Armory Foundation money that was broken up by Mayor Brown and given to arts groups across the city.

On January 25, 1997, the Redstone Labor Temple Mural Project was dedicated by San Francisco mayor Willie L. Brown, Jr.

The lobby and first floor of the Redstone's walls are covered by the CAMP murals, covering the building's labor, Filipino, Latino and gay history that "reflect the building’s history and many uses" and are "commemorating key labor actions like the (1934) strike and picket by the Chinese Garment Workers Union and the formation of the Bindery Women's Union."

Six of the completed Red Stone Building murals depict the activities of the labor unions in the building (from 1914 to 1966). Chuck Sperry recreated the scene of a Labor Council planning meeting for the landmark 1934 General Strike, while Aaron Noble's piece illustrates two important moments in the city's labor history—when the corrupt union official Ben Rasnick was thrown out of the Red Stone Building by Dow Wilson; and, later, when Wilson was murdered by shotgun fire on April 5, 1966.

Other labor-themed murals in the building are Isis Rodriguez's illustration of the Bindery Women's Local 125, which occupied the building in the early 1920s; Sebastiana Pastor's depicting the organization of the Chinese Ladies Garment Workers Union Local 341 in 1938; Ruby Neri (with Alicia McCarthy)'s personal work (in ball-point pen) on the theme of sign painting—an oblique tribute to Sign Painters' Local 510, which sanctioned the project; and Susan Greene's rendering of the Service Employees International Union's hotel and department store strike of 1941.

The remaining six murals reflect later uses of the building. Two are historical: John Fadeff's piece evokes construction of the building's foundation, and Carolyn Castaño's depicts ballroom dancing in the former Filipino-American social club. Others reflect the building's current uses: an abstract piece by stencil artist Scott Williams for the entrance of the LAB, invoking a technological urban landscape; Barry McGee's illustration of immigrants floating to a new land; Rigo '97's "3/4 Water," celebrating the environmental organizations in the building; and Matt Day's small piece dedicated to the building's many alternative media organizations. Later, a mural honoring long-time building tenant Theater Rhinoceros was added to the project.

There is also a mural on the second-floor produced by the former Women's Luna Sea Theater Company.

The project was coordinated by the interdisciplinary artists group known as The LAB which produces art shows and events year round in the former labor temple's auditorium.

== Redstone Tenants Association ==
The tenants of the Redstone started organizing and formed the Redstone Tenants Association (RTA) in 1999 to coordinate organizing around possibly buying the building and making general improvements to the large property as part of a general concern about gentrification of the neighborhood resulting in evictions and rising rents. San Francisco was experiencing a hot rental market with the dot-com boom that created high-paying technical jobs and, in the process, displaced both commercial and residential renters with evictions and skyrocketing rents. With the help of the Mission Economic Development Association (MEDA) the tenants obtained a grant to do their own economic analysis of the building with the intent to make a formal bid for purchase. A variety of entities were approached with the hope of finding a non-profit owner. The Redstone Tenants Association is now known as the Redstone Labor Temple Association and has 501(c)(3) status.

== San Francisco Designated Landmark ==
The first grant the RTA obtained was for $2,000 from the National Trust for Historic Preservation, which was used to start the process of obtaining historic landmark status for the building. The landmarking took from 2001 to 2004 to complete. The city formalized the building's historic status on July 14, 2004, assigning it number 238. It is the second labor-related historic landmark in San Francisco. Exactly three years to the date of gaining historic landmark status, the annual "Labor Fest" did the first mural tour of the building and surrounding neighborhood.

On July 31, 2004, the Redstone celebrated the landmark status that had been bestowed by the San Francisco Board of Supervisors. The event included a proclamation from the Board as well as Walter Johnson, head of the SF Labor Council, who presented the plaque to the Redstone Building manager and Betty Traynor, RTA organizer. The event included musicians, poetry and historic information about the building, along with union members whose organizations once inhabited the former union hall.

== GLBT Historical Society ==
The Redstone Building was the location of the first public archives and office of the Gay and Lesbian Historical Society (now known as the GLBT Historical Society), an internationally recognized museum, archives and research center for gay, lesbian, bisexual and transgender history. Founded in 1985, the organization was housed in a private home until 1990, when it moved into a basement space in the Redstone Building. After five years, the society moved out of the building and has subsequently been housed in larger spaces on Market Street and Mission Street in San Francisco.

=== Unions ===
Unions
- AFSCME Local 1650 CUCE
- American Federation of Teachers #2121
- Asbestos Workers #16
- Automobile, Truck and Car Painters #1073
- Bakers #24 1947–1952 (1)
- Beer Wagon(Brewery) Drivers #888 1947–1960
- Bill Posters International Union
- Bindery Women's Union Local 125
- Bindery Local #31–125 (Men's local merged with women's in 1917)
- Blacksmith's #1168 1947–1960
- Boilermakers 1954
- Boot and Shoe Repairers
- Bottlers #896 1947–1960
- Brewers, Maltsters and Yeasters #893 1947–1960
- Brewery Drivers # 888
- Bricklayers Local #7
- Brotherhood of Painters, Decorators and Paperhangers' San Francisco Local 4
- Bus Wagon Drivers 1947–1952
- Butchers #508 1947
- Candy Workers #158 1947–1960
- Carmen Division #1380 1960
- Carpenters local # 2167 or (2164?)
- Cement Masons #580
- Chinese Garment Workers Local 341
- Cleaners #3010
- Cleaners & Dyers #7 1947–1952
- Construction & Labors Union #261
- Coppersmith's #438 1947–1960
- Drydock and Marine Waysmen #3116 1947–1953
- Electrical workers #1245
- Fish Cannery Workers 1947-9
- Firemen & Oilmen 1949
- Garment Workers #131 1947–1960
- Hard Hat Construction Magazine 1999
- Industrial Workers of the World local 23 1996–2006
- International Longshoremen Association 1954
- Iron Workers local #377
- Labor Clarion 1915–1947
- Labor Committee on Intolerance 1950–1960
- Labor Video Project
- Laundry Workers #26 1947–1952
- Leather Workers #31 1947–1954
- Machinists #68 1947–1952
- Metal Polishers #128 1947–1960
- Metal Production Workers 1948–1951
- Metal Trades Council (Pacific Coast District) 1947–1954
- Milk Wagon Drivers #226 1947–1960
- Miscellaneous Culinary Employees #110
- Molders #164 (1)
- National Writers Union
- Office Employees #3 1951-2
- Office Employees #36 1950-1
- Painters Union Local #4
- Painters #8 District Council
- Painters #19
- Pattern Makers Association 1947–1954
- Production Machinists 1947–1954
- Professional Embalmers #9049
- Railway Carmen #750 1947
- Retail Delivery Drivers #278 1947–1954
- Roofers #40
- Rural Delivery Workers 1947
- San Francisco Labor Council 1915–1968
- SF Labor Temple Hall Association 1915–1968
- SFLC Strategy Committee 1947
- Sanitary Truck Drivers #350 1947–1960
- SEIU local Department Store Workers
- Shipyard Laborers 1947 (1)
- Ship Painters #961 1947–1954
- Signpainters Local 510
- Sprinkler Fitters #483
- Sweat Magazine
- Taxicab Workers #8294
- The Organizer
- Tool & Diemakers 1948
- Union Agency of California
- Union Key Tax Service of the Bay Area
- Union Label Section 1947-1960
- Union Labor Party 1947–1960
- United Furniture Workers #262 1960
- United Garment Workers #131 1947–1960
- United Taxicab Workers 1999–present
- Upholsters #28 1947–1954
- Waitress workers local
- Web pressmen #4
- Wharehouse men #12 1950-3

=== Non-Union organizations ===
- 415 Records
- 4SD (computer consulting)
- 500 Years Coalition (First Nation's anniversary)
- Abalone Alliance
- Academic Research Information System (ARIS)
- Agit Spin Productions
- Alcoholics Anonymous
- Alpha Graphics
- Arriba Juntos
- Balone Print Coop
- Bay Area Girls Network
- Bay Area Physicians for Human Rights (AIDS)
- BAVC
- Bay View/Hunters Point Neighborhood Assoc. (handicapped)
- William Becker
- Big Mountain Support Group
- BikeAid
- Bilingual Cine-Television (BCT) 1974–1978
- Bolerium Books
- Cafe Gaudi
- California Prison Focus
- CARES: Catholic Charities Project
- Catholic Charities (immigration program)
- Center for Human Development
- Chile Lindo
- Chile Resource Center & Clearinghouse
- Chris Daly for Supervisor Campaign
- Collision Course
- Comprehensive Communications
- Dan's Travel Agency
- Donor Network
- Don't Waste California
- EL-LA
- Eviction Defense Network
- Family Resource Development Agency
- Film Arts Foundation
- Fil-Am Employ & Training Center
- Fine Line Construction
- FPITS international
- Regine Forbis
- Gay & Lesbian Historical Society (now known as the GLBT Historical Society)
- Global Exchange
- Gray Panthers
- Green Cab
- Green Party SF local
- Grupo Maya
- Haight Ashbury Switchboard
- Health Fair Project
- Homeless Children's Network
- Homes Not Borders
- Indybay (Indymedia)
- International Indian Treaty Council
- Jackie Inc.
- Dr. Lastrei (sp)
- Latin American Resource & Clearinghouse
- Jack Lei DDS
- Jobs with Peace
- June 21 city celebrations
- LIP magazine
- Luna Sea (women's theater collective)
- MAS Media
- Mission Agenda
- Mission Area Federal Credit Union
- Mission Health Clinic Teen Project
- Mission Community Legal Defense
- Mission Foot Lab
- Mobile Assistance Patrol
- Neighbor to Neighbor
- New World University
- North/South Communications
- October 22 Coalition
- Open Forum (Collective discussion group)
- Outlook (Gay Newspaper)
- Outsider Enterprises
- Pacific Petitions
- Peru Support Committee
- Philippine Resource Center
- Phreda Clinic
- Poor Magazine
- Miquel Quiroz
- San Francisco Clinic Consortium
- San Francisco Coalition for Living Wages
- San Francisco Sane/Freeze
- San Francisco Sex Information
- John Sheppard Esq.
- Site Design Online
- Sisters of Perpetual Indulgence
- Smoke Shop
- Tony Garcia
- Socialist Review
- Spirit Menders
- Spring Leather
- Temple Shave (barber shop: 2944 16th)
- Bob Edelstein
- Irving Terrel
- Joves
- Temp Workers Net
- Unified School District Adult Education
- Video Activist Network
- Western Regional Advocacy Project (WRAP)
- Whispered Media
- W.O.M.A.N. Inc
- Women for Nuclear Disarmament (WAND)
- Women's health collective
- World Can't Wait
- Doctor Yeh (acupuncture)
- Youth Credit Union Project (YCUP)
- Mobilization for Aids

=== Artists and Arts Organizations ===
- Art & Revolution
- Bad Dog Jewelry
- April Berger
- Film Arts Foundation
- Scott Hewicker
- Circuit Network
- Cine Accion
- Club Kommotion
- Rick Gerharter
- Susan Greene
- Iraya Robles/Gary Gregerson
- Kulintang Arts
- Making Waves
- MoJo Theater
- Molly Hankwitz
- Cliff Hengst
- Mark Huestis
- Jocelyn & Amy
- Luna Sea (women's theater collective)
- Laura Modigliani
- Sisters of Perpetual Indulgence
- Teatro De La Esperanza
- Teatro Ng Tanan Theater
- Ben Terrall
- Tilapia Film LLC
- Theater Rhinosceros
- The LAB
- Benji Whalen
- Whispered Media
- Megan Wilson
- Jon Winters

== Twenty-first century ==
As of the year 1999, the current building had nearly 50,000 square feet (4,600 m^{2}) of tenant space housing over forty tenants and four theaters, including Theatre Rhinoceros, the oldest gay theater in the U.S. and the Redstone's largest tenant.

Today, its tenants include three theater ensembles: gay Theatre Rhinoceros, feminist Luna Sea, and the Latino El Teatro de la Esperanza. Other causes are evidenced by the groups' names: the Mission Area Federal Credit Union, the Filipino-American Employment and Training Center, the Industrial Workers of the World, the Homeless Children's Network, the Coalition on Homelessness, Hard Hat Magazine, the Eviction Defense Network, California Prison Focus, and on and on. "We call it a microcosm of the Mission and The City," said Elisabeth Beaird, the administrative director of The Lab, a visual and performance art gallery. "Almost every group is represented: Latino, activist causes, the arts, gays."

In 2021, the Redstone Building was sold to Lakeside Investment Company, raising concerns about potential rent increases. In 2026, Lakeside Investment Company sold the building to a group of investors with ties to San Francisco-based Graymark Capital.

== See also ==
- 1934 West Coast Waterfront Strike
- Eight hour day
- Harry Bridges
- Labour Day
- Landrum-Griffin Act
- List of San Francisco Designated Landmarks
- List of Registered Historic Places in San Francisco, California
- Salting
- The LAB
- Strike
- Workers Memorial Day
