= Christopher Statton =

American artist (born 1977)

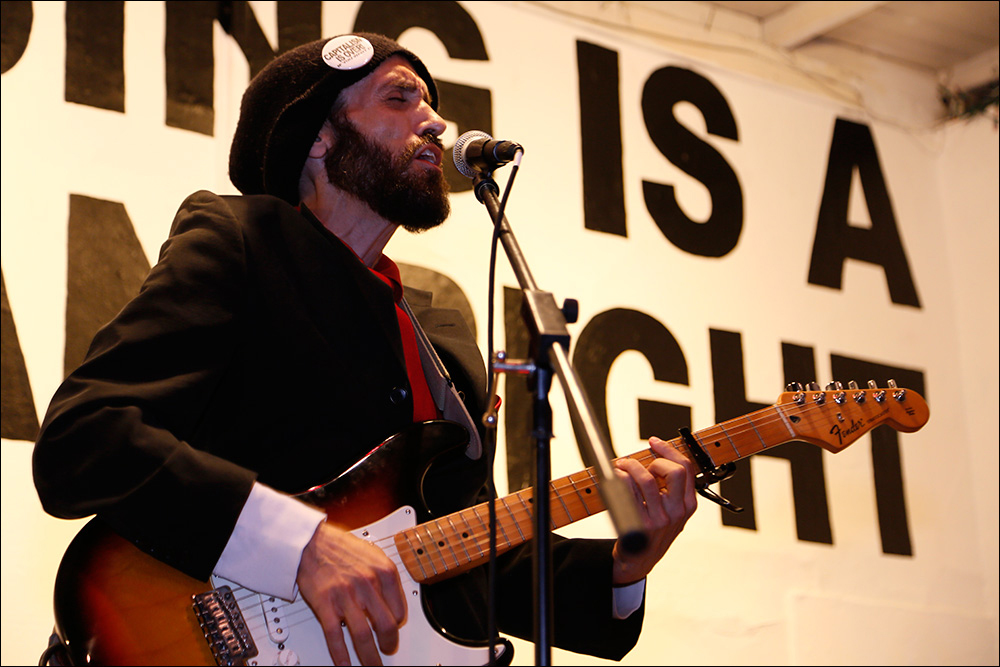
- Christopher Statton performing at "Better Homes & Gardens Today" event to raise money for organizations that serve homeless communities in San Francisco
- Born: 1977 (age 48–49)
- Known for: Public Art, Activism
- Awards: Marlon Riggs Award

Christopher Statton is an American artist, arts administrator, and community activist based in the San Francisco Bay Area. Statton is best known for his role in establishing San Francisco's oldest continuously running theater, the Roxie Theater as a non-profit during his four-year tenure as executive director, 2010 – 2013. In 2013 he was awarded the Marlon Riggs Award by the San Francisco Film Critics Circle for “his significant contribution to San Francisco’s film community through the Roxie Theater over the past four years.” Ryan Coogler also received the award for his film Fruitvale Station. In 2013, San Francisco District 9 Supervisor David Campos awarded Statton with a Certificate of Honor for his “important and tireless work with the Roxie.” Statton resigned from the Roxie in 2013 due to health concerns.

== Biography ==
Born with haemophilia, Statton was one of the 6,000 – 10,000 hemophiliacs to be infected with both HIV and hepatitis C from contaminated haemophilia blood products in the early eighties by the pharmaceutical companies that were producing concentrate factor VIII, namely the Bayer Corporation. Living with these diseases for all or most of his life (he's had HIV and hepatitis C since he was four-years-old) has led Statton to be a fierce activist for social and economic justice.

== Community activism ==
In 2006 Statton co-founded the project Sidewalk Sideshow with Reverend Paul Gaffney as a project of the Marin Interfaith Street Chaplaincy. The project produces music shows with San Rafael's street and homeless community. In 2013 Statton co-launched the Roxie Theater's Lights. Camera. Action! Awards to honor Bay Area social justice documentary filmmakers. The inaugural Awards honored the filmmaking team Rob Epstein and Jeffrey Friedman (filmmaker) and filmmaker Hima B for the significant contributions these filmmakers have had in bringing attention and awareness to the challenges of those living with HIV/AIDS. In 2016 Statton was asked to be a part of the HIV Story Project, co-founded by Marc Smolowitz. The HIV Story Project has archived over 1,000 videos from survivors and others affected by HIV online at www.thehivstoryproject.org.

Between 2014 and 2015, Statton worked with the Gubbio Project, which provides an average of 100 people from the street community with safety and rest on the pews in the sanctuary of St. Boniface church in San Francisco's Tenderloin neighborhood each weekday from 6am to 3pm. The Gubbio Project also provides toiletries, blankets, clothing vouchers, referrals, clean bathrooms, and haircuts for its community. In 2015 Statton co-produced the event Blanket Statements, An Evening of Comedy with W. Kamau Bell to benefit the Gubbio Project.

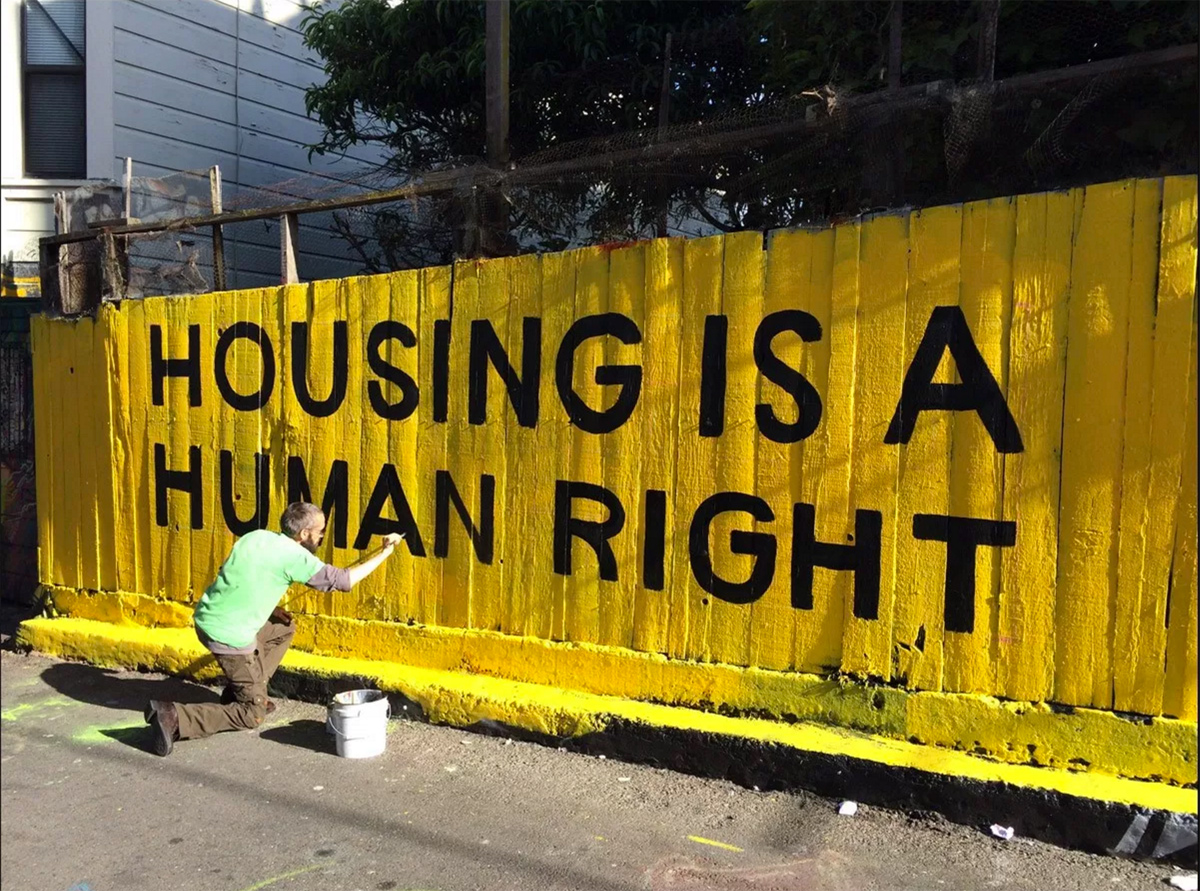
Mural by Christopher Statton and Megan Wilson, 2015

== Art projects ==
Statton is one of the core organizers and a member of the Board of Directors of the Clarion Alley Mural Project (CAMP). In 2014 he collaborated with artists and CAMP organizers Megan Wilson and Mike Reger to create the mural "Wall of Shame & Solutions" on Clarion Alley in San Francisco's Mission District to call out the city's government officials on the highly contested policies that are impacting the changing character of San Francisco. In 2015 Statton collaborated with poet Tony Robles to create the mural "No Clear-Cutting Our Community" on Clarion Alley, protesting Forest City Enterprises' 5M development in San Francisco's South of Market neighborhood. Statton has also created two murals on Clarion Alley with his collaborator Megan Wilson in 2015 and 2016 in support of "Housing Is A Human Right." In 2016 Statton collaborated with the San Francisco Poster Syndicate to paint the mural anti-Trump mural Cultivating Resistance in response to the election.

In 2015 Statton and Wilson were invited to participate in the Geneng Street Art Project in Yogyakarta Indonesia, organized by Ruang Kelas SD. The theme of the project was "Gemah Ripah Loh Jinawi," which translates to a critique of the unprecedented levels of development and displacement, impacting farmers and the natural resources in the areas surrounding the city of Yogyakarta. Wilson and Statton were two of the 30+ artists to paint murals on the facades of the homes in the farming community of Sewon.

Statton and Wilson launched the public project Better Homes & Gardens Today in fall 2014, creating a limited edition of 300 pairs of hand-painted signs with the word “Home” in different languages accompanied by a flower. Statton and Wilson state the project's goals to: “1) Heighten awareness around 'home' and the realities of homelessness; 2) Cultivate a dialog within communities and amongst disparate groups – especially with those in the tech sector who are having a significant impact on housing instability in the Bay Area - about the funding and policy change that is needed to help end homelessness; and 3) To raise money to benefit the Gubbio Project, the Coalition on Homelessness, San Francisco, and At The Crossroads, organizations working to address homelessness in San Francisco.” "Better Homes & Gardens Today" was included in the exhibition "Street Messages" at Lazarides Gallery in London as part of the launch of the book "Street Messages, edited by Nicholas Ganz.

In 2022, scholar and activist Dr. Steven Thrasher dedicated his book The Viral Underclass: The Human Toll When Inequality and Disease Collide to Statton, Syed Ali, Eli Pollard, Tanya McKinnon, and Matt Mager.
