= Leslie Dreyer =

Leslie Dreyer is a Bay Area-based artist, educator and organizer. She designs creative action, art, and media strategies for social justice initiatives, largely focused on global real estate speculation, hyper-gentrification, displacement, and the tech industry's impact on housing and inequality. The collaborative work often fuses public installation, guerrilla theatre, tactical media and smart mobs.

== Career and work ==
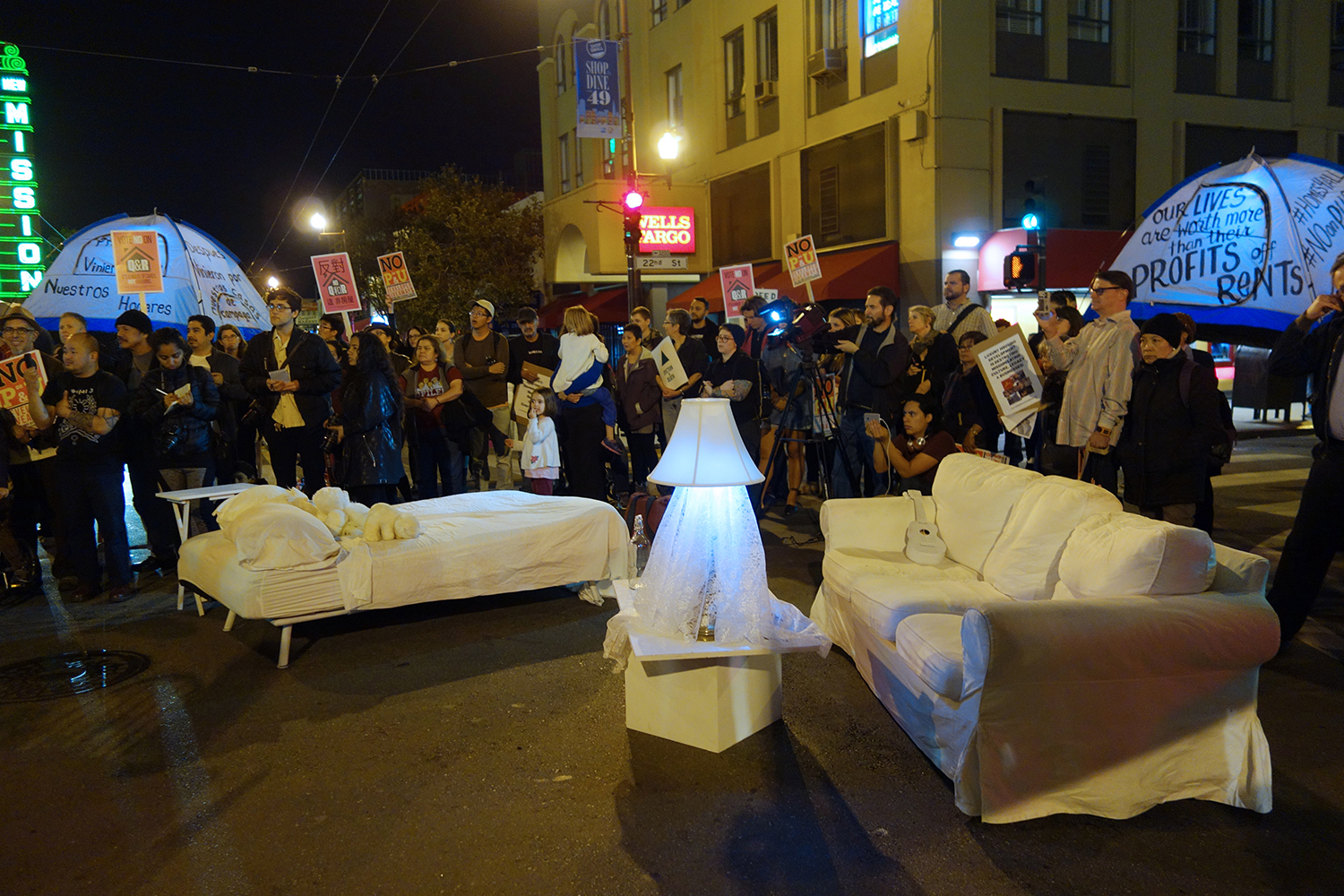
Unsanctioned public installation on the site of a burned-out affordable housing complex in San Francisco. Designed by Leslie Dreyer and co-organized with San Francisco Anti-Displacement Coalition, Coalition on Homelessness, housed and unhoused residents.

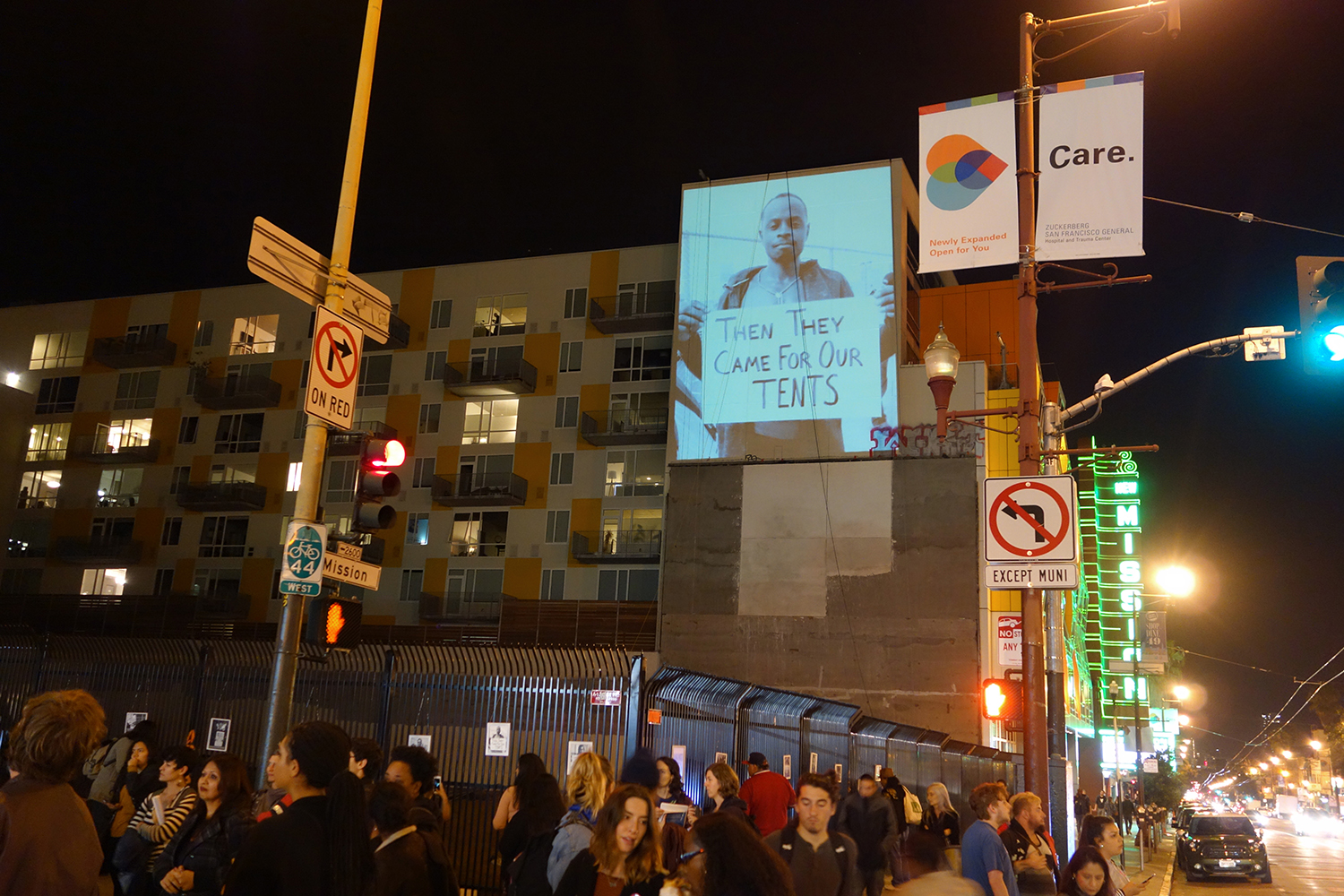

Dreyer was the director of Parallax View: The Political Economy of Images for Cinematexas International Short Film Festival from 2003 to 2007 and also curated international and political films for Ann Arbor Film Festival in 2006 and 2007. She was a writer for ArtThreat from 2007 to 2010. In 2013, she directed and edited the documentary Ghosts of the River: Out of the Shadows for ShadowLight Productions.

Throughout 2011, Dreyer was an organizing artist with US Uncut's San Francisco chapter, which used creative direct action to draw attention to corporate tax avoidance and its links to social spending cuts.

From 2013 to 2016 she was an artist and member of Heart of the City Collective, which initiated the San Francisco tech bus protests. This fast-growing network of private shuttles that ferry tech workers to Silicon Valley are linked to rent increases and evictions in neighborhoods they serve. The first action resulted in over a hundred articles in local and international media and set off a series of tech bus blockades led by both Heart of the city and other grassroots groups. According to Berkeley professor Abigail De Kosnik, the resulting protests can be viewed as "synecdoches for the anger that many San Francisco residents feel towards technological privilege and its facilitation of a widening of a class divide in the city."

Since 2015 Dreyer has worked as an artist and anti-eviction organizer in collaboration with Housing Rights Committee of San Francisco, San Francisco Anti-Displacement Coalition, and Coalition on Homelessness. Dreyer has organized collaborative creative interventions at AirBnB's headquarters, in a burned-out affordable housing complex, and outside tech conferences.

Dreyer also lectures and organizes workshops focused on housing justice, techno-capitalism, surveillance, displacement, tactical performance, creative direct action, and media strategies rooted in on-the-ground movement work. She has presented work at Yerba Buena Center for the Arts, the DeYoung Museum, Berkeley Center for New Media, and the San Francisco Art Institute among others.

== Awards ==
- 2018 San Francisco Arts Commission Grant in collaboration with Coalition on Homelessness for Stolen Belonging, a year-long initiative working in collaboration with San Francisco homeless residents to archive and spotlight personal items stolen and trashed by SF Police Department and City workers during their ongoing homeless sweeps.
- 2016 and 2018 UC Berkeley American Cultures Engaged Scholarship Artist in Residence.
- 2015-16 East Bay Fund for Artists Grant for Boom: The Art of Resistance gallery show
- 2014 The Murphy and Cadogan Contemporary Arts Award, SF Bay Area, CA
