= Fred Rinne =

American visual and performance artist

- Born: 1955 (age 69–70); Crescent City, California
- Occupation: Artist

Fred Rinne (born 1955) is an American visual and performance artist. His cross disciplinary approach, outsider aesthetic and overriding cultural critique defines his work.

"As an American I feel that I have grown up bathed in pop schlock against my will. It was always the background noise of my culture... Instead of a real culture where songs actually mean something, we have this junk culture of entertainment working on the principle of planned obsolescence. We don't have to eat the same hamburgers, listen to the same music, or see the same images. I struggle for a world where every man can be his own Manilow."

Born in Crescent City, California, United States, Rinne grew up in California, settling in 1980 in San Francisco. He studied theater arts and art in Modesto, Sacramento, and San Francisco, ending up with a science degree in Environmental Studies from San Francisco State University.

He began showing his paintings and sculptures in the 1980s, and has exhibited at The LAB, Show and Tell Gallery, San Francisco Arts Commission Gallery, Z Gallerie, and the Endeavor House in London, England. Rinne's graphics and articles have appeared in San Francisco Bay Area publications Frank, Processed World, Filth, Weekly Weird News, Flatter, and the Anderson Valley Advertiser, as well as Le Dernier Cri in Marseilles, France.

In 1985, Rinne co-founded the sound performance group National Disgrace, and later the Bringdownz. These groups performed at Artists' Television Access, the Great American Music Hall and other Bay Area venues. Rinne began to produce artist books around 2000, including "Santa Christ," "Temp Worker," and "Ice Cream Bummer."

He has collaborated on books with Marshall Weber, Scott Williams, and Dana Smith, and exhibited at the San Francisco Center for the Book, Booklyn Book Arts Salon, and other venues. His original, hand-painted books are owned by the Pompidou Center, Paris, France, Bibliothèque Nationale du Luxemburg, Kunstbibliotek, Berlin, Germany, as well as many universities and other collections in the United States.

== Sources ==
- Rowell, Mike, "Bring on the Noise", SF Weekly, 1993.
- Glass, Seymour, "National Disgrace" interview, Banafish Magazine, 1987
