= CoH =

CoH and COH may refer to:

- CoH (musician), Russian electronic musician, also known as Ivan Pavlov
- Cash on hand, see Reserve (accounting)
- Cathedral of Hope (Dallas)
- Central Oak Heights, a summer cottage community in Kelly Township, Pennsylvania
- The Children of Húrin, a novel by J. R. R. Tolkien
- Christian Outreach to the Handicapped, a disability organisation in Singapore
- City of Heroes, a massively multiplayer online role-playing computer game based on superhero comics
- City of Houston, Texas
- Croton-on-Hudson, New York
- Coalition on Homelessness
  - Coalition on Homelessness, San Francisco
- Corporal of Horse, a British Army cavalry rank
- Company of Heroes, a real-time strategy computer game based on World War II
  - Company of Heroes: Opposing Fronts
  - Company of Heroes: Tales of Valor
- Coach Inc. (stock symbol: COH)
- Crowborough railway station (station code: COH), East Sussex, England
- RAF Coltishall (ICAO: COH), Norfolk, East Anglia
