= Scott Williams (artist) =

American artist (1956–2024)

- Born: August 15, 1956; Los Angeles, California, U.S.
- Died: May 26, 2024 (aged 67); San Francisco, California, U.S.
- Occupation: Artist

Mural at Yerba Buena Center for the Arts

Scott Williams (August 15, 1956 – May 26, 2024) was an American artist best known for paintings made using stencils. He began working with stencils in the early 1980s, painting on walls, cars and paper and objects. He has painted many murals in San Francisco and was dubbed by artist/writer Aaron Noble The Stencil Godfather of the Mission, where stencil art was common. Williams has painted numerous murals in San Francisco, both indoors and out, including Armadillo's on Fillmore Street, Amoeba Records, Clarion Alley, Leather Tongue video, The Chamelleon bar, DNA Lounge, Burger Joint, Pedal Revolution, and The Lab. The preponderance of his work in the Mission and his ability to go back and forth from street to studio has led some people to see him as a forerunner of the Mission school, which coalesced 10 years after he began working in the neighborhood. Working outside the mainstream, Williams exhibited at alternative spaces throughout the 80s and 90s including Show and Tell Gallery, Altarpiece at the Offensive, Bibliomancy, the Adobe Bookstore and Southern Exposure. As curatorial awareness of Williams grew, he was invited to exhibit at Yerba Buena Center for the Arts, and the San Francisco Art Institute.

== Biography ==
Williams was born in Los Angeles, California, and grew up in Santa Barbara. He began painting with watercolor in high school, and studied art and anthropology at Santa Barbara City College, Cabrillo College, and Sonoma State University. He moved to San Francisco in 1979, and began to work in color xerox. He lived at the Goodman Building, the last of San Francisco's artist hotels, and was present for its closing and evictions in 1983. The long battle between the Goodman Building's tenants and the city, which owned it, ultimately led to passage of 1988 Live/Work legislation, which made it easier for artists to live in commercial zones.

In 1983, Williams moved to Los Angeles and collaborated with Didier Cremieux on a large painting called "History of the World" which was featured in Emigre magazine. In 1984, he moved to Santa Barbara, continued painting and helped to run Talk Gallery. By 1985, he was back in San Francisco, where he developed a handmade comic series with the characters Robot Dog, Cyber Kitty, and Mean Mouse.

During the early 1990s, Williams collaborated with the artist Rigo on a series of large murals for the DNA Lounge, including one called the Philip K. Dick Tribute mural. In 1991, Williams was the subject of a documentary called "Spraypaint" by Nick Gorski. In 2005, Williams received the Adeline Kent award and was given a retrospective exhibit at the Walter and McBean Galleries of the San Francisco Art Institute.

In the late 1990s, health problems forced Williams to abandon spray paint for airbrush and he began to focus on smaller paintings and books. Williams' collaborative hand-painted books include "Gemstone Fever" (2003), "Horses West" (2005) "Amerika Cup" (2006) with Fred Rinne "Collect Call from the Spirit World" (2006) and "Watch Your Step" (2007) with Fred Rinne and Dana Smith. Williams' art books are distributed by "Booklyn" and can be found in libraries around the world.

In 2012, the interior of Williams' Mission District home was reproduced at Steven Wolf Fine Arts.

Williams died of an infection on May 26, 2024.
