= Keyvan Shovir =

Iranian Artist

Keyvan Heydari-Shovir
- کیوان حیدری شویر
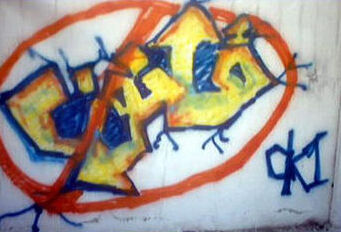
- A piece by CK1 titled Law is Banned, 2002
- Born: 1985 (age 40–41); Tehran, Iran
- Other names: CK1
- Education: University of Tabriz; California College of the Arts
- Known for: Public art; Graffiti; Installation art
- Website: keyvanshovir.com

Keyvan Heydari-Shovir (Persian:کیوان حیدری شویر; born September 1985), also known as CK1, is an Iranian-born contemporary artist, and street artist. His work combines Iranian traditional culture with contemporary pop culture, and he is a pioneer of Iranian graffiti art. He lives in Los Angeles, and previously lived in San Francisco and Tehran.

== Early life and education ==
Keyvan Heydari-Shovir was born in 1985 in Tehran, Iran, during the Iran–Iraq War.

He obtained his BA degree (2009) in painting from the University of Tabriz; and a Master of Fine Arts degree (2018) from the California College of the Arts. In 2011, following the Green Revolution in 2009, he moved to the United States.

== Career ==
Shovir was among the first artists who established the Iranian graffiti movement that emerged in Tehran in 2002. He uses Persian alphabet and Islamic art motifs in his work, exploring Iranian poets like Hafez and Rumi. His stencils are inspired by Persian miniature art.

He was friends with the members of the band The Yellow Dogs in Iran, two of whom were killed in a shooting in Brooklyn in 2013.

Shovir was featured in the film documentary, Mutiny of Colours (2016) as one of Iran's formative street artists.

=== Murals ===
He has done several street and public art projects in San Francisco. In 2015, in Clarion Alley, Shovir put up a mural with artist Shaghayegh Cyrous, "In Memory Of", was made in the memory of three female Iranian literary figures - Forough Farrokhzad, Simin Behbahani, and Simin Daneshvar. In 2020, Shovir painted "In Memory of George Floyd 1974–2020" in Clarion Alley in San Francisco.

In 2022, Shovir painted a mural located at 19449 Ventura Blvd. in Tarzana, California, which depicts Mahsa Amini without a headscarf along with a protestor, Nika Shakarami.

== Exhibitions ==
- "Once at Present - Contemporary Art of the Iranian Diaspora", curated by Kevin B. Chen and Taraneh Hemami, Minnesota Street Project, March 29 - April 20, 2019
- "Bankgit Arise", an art residency and cultural exchange between Indonesia and the United States; Asian Art Museum, and Clarion Alley Mural Project, Asian Art Museum, San Francisco, CA, 2018
- "Art for Peace" at Temple Art Loft, Vallejo, CA, 2018
- "Commencement Exhibition", California College of the Arts, San Francisco, CA, 2018
- "Betweenescapes", curated by Kathy Zarur and Roula Seikaly at SOMArts Cultural Center, San Francisco, CA, 2018
- "CCA MFA Thesis Exhibition" at Minnesota Street Project, 2018, San Francisco, CA
- "A Conversation on Race & Identity", curated by Jan Marlese at LH Horton Jr Art Gallery at Delta College in Stockton, 2018
- "Seven Valleys" Exhibition by Artists-In-Residence Lauren Marie Taylor and Keyvan Shovir", Chandra Cerrito Contemporary, Oakland, CA, 2018
- "Collaboration & Connection, In Collaboration with Lauren Marie Taylor", the 4th Interfaith Art Exhibition Biennial Islamic Cultural Center of Northern California, Oakland, CA, 2018
- "Ascension Series", 7th Annual Misfit Maker Factory, Root Division Gallery, San Francisco, 2017
- "Ascension Series", Make Art/Work - 2017, College Avenue Galleries, Oakland, 2017
- "Mihrab, Neighbors", Embark Gallery, San Francisco, 2017
- "Conversation of the Birds", the Murphy & Cadogan Art Awards Exhibition, SOMArts Cultural Center, San Francisco, 2017
- "Conversation of the Birds", Root Division Gallery, San Francisco, 2017
- "Fabrications, Theory of Survival Project", in collaboration with Taraneh Hemami, Southern Exposure (SoEx), San Francisco, 2014

== See also ==
- Calligraffiti
