= Tony Taccone =

American theatre director (born 1951)

- Born: July 4, 1951 (age 75); New York City, U.S.
- Occupation: Theatre director
- Years active: 1981–present
- Spouse(s): Suellen Ehnebuske (divorced); Morgan Forsey
- Children: 2

Tony Taccone (born July 4, 1951) is an American theater director, and the former artistic director of Berkeley Repertory Theatre in Berkeley, California.

== Early life ==
Tony Taccone was born on July 4, 1951, in Queens, New York, to an Italian-American father and a Puerto Rican mother. They encouraged their children to go into the arts; their daughter became a photographer, and both sons found careers in theater.

Taccone attended Boston College as an English major. He frequently participated in poetry readings, which led to performance art. After marrying, he accompanied his wife to the University of Colorado and became involved in the drama department. His acting troupe asked him to fill in for their sick director and stage the next play. Taccone called the gig the "closest thing I ever had to an epiphany," and permanently went behind the curtain. After graduating, Taccone enrolled in UC Berkeley in the doctoral directing program.

== Career ==
The one thing you cannot do in comedy is to go for the laugh.

— American Theater magazine

When Richard E.T. White became artistic director of the Eureka Theatre, a converted warehouse in San Francisco's Mission District, he invited Taccone along. In 1981, White left and Taccone replaced him as the artistic director. It was there that Taccone began his partnership with Tony Kushner, who he commissioned to write what Kushner thought would be a short chamber piece called Angels in America. Over Taccone's tenure there, the Eureka's annual budget grew from $60,000 to $780,000 as their subscriber number grew to 2,400 and the repertory moved to a new building because their theater was destroyed by an arsonist. Despite the growth, they required $1.3 million in order to stay afloat, and talks began that the repertory could not sustain its artists with growing families. Taccone was extremely reluctant to leave, but announced his resignation in 1988.

That year, Taccone became the associate artistic director of Berkeley Rep under Sharon Ott, again replacing White. Right around that time, Angels in America, which ended up becoming a two-part, seven-hour epic, was becoming a national sensation critically and otherwise, and a boon to the Eureka. Four years later (in 1992), he and Oskar Eustis co-directed the world premiere of the complete work at the Mark Taper Forum. In 1997, Berkeley Rep won a Tony for Best Regional Theater. That year, Ott left to become artistic director of Seattle Repertory, and Taccone became full artistic director, where he has staged more than 35 shows, including the world premieres of Continental Divide and Culture Clash in AmeriCCa. He has collaborated with Kushner on six projects. Their latest piece featured designs by beloved children’s author, Maurice Sendak: Brundibar debuted at Berkeley Rep and then traveled to Yale Rep and the New Victory Theater in New York City. Taccone made his Broadway debut with Sarah Jones’s Bridge & Tunnel. He also staged the show’s record-breaking off-Broadway run at Culture Project, workshopped it for Broadway at Berkeley Rep and directed Jones’ previous hit, Surface Transit. Taccone frequently works at Ashland’s Oregon Shakespeare Festival, where he has directed Coriolanus, Othello, Pentecost, the American premiere of Seamus Heaney’s The Cure at Troy, and his production of David Edgar’s Continental Divide, which also played at the Berkeley Rep and in England at Birmingham Rep and London’s Barbican Centre. His other regional credits include noted theatres such as Actors Theatre of Louisville, Arizona Rep, La Jolla Playhouse, San Jose Rep, Seattle Rep and San Francisco’s Eureka Theatre, where he served six years as artistic director before coming to Berkeley Rep. Taccone has served on the faculty of U.C. Berkeley, sat on the board of Theatre Communications Group and acted as a regional representative for the Stage Directors and Choreographers Society.

Playbill recently asserted that "Tony Taccone may very well be the most prominent artistic director in America right now." During his tenure, Berkeley Rep has emerged as the source of many important Broadway shows, including Green Day's American Idiot, Sarah Ruhl's In the Next Room, or the vibrator play, Carrie Fisher's Wishful Drinking, Sarah Jones' Bridge & Tunnel, and Passing Strange. Two of Taccone’s recent shows also transferred to London: Continental Divide played the Barbican in 2004, and Tiny Kushner played the Tricycle Theatre in 2010.

Taccone's professional career has included fostering clowning, a fascination he developed when he went to take his small family to see the Pickle Family Circus in the 1980s. He favors clown artistry that is a reaction to tragedy.

Taccone has been called a "theatrical midwife" because he often encourages and fosters new talent. Examples include his work with Sarah Jones on Surface Transit and the aforementioned Tony Kushner.

In 2009, Taccone participated in A Night With the Stars, a play performed by persons who were previously homeless. The play was done as a fundraiser for Community Housing Partnership in San Francisco.

Taccone made his playwriting debut in May 2011 with his solo show for Rita Moreno and followed this up with his show Ghost Light at the Oregon Shakespeare Festival in 2011, which he co-created with Jonathan Moscone.

Taccone directed the original musical Kiss My Aztec, which he co-wrote with John Leguizamo (score by Benjamin Velez and David Kamp). It was developed at the Public Theater in 2018 and premiered at Berkeley Repertory Theater and La Jolla Playhouse in 2019, where it received critical acclaim.

In 2019, Taccone ended his 33 year tenure as Artistic Director of Berkeley Repertory Theatre, handing the position over to Johanna Pfaelzer.

== Personal life ==
You can have a healthy, happy life and still be indelibly connected to the deeper sorrow of the world. You don't need to create personal trauma to experience darkness. In fact, in some rarefied theological schools of thought, one could argue the opposite.

— American Theater magazine, 2006

Taccone is married to Morgan Forsey. Taccone's children include Jorma Taccone, (a member of the sketch-comedy troupe the Lonely Island and a former writer for Saturday Night Live) and Asa Taccone, a musician and sometimes collaborator with his brother. Asa is a founding member of the band Electric Guest and has composed music for his father's productions, such as for Bridge & Tunnel and Taking Over.

== Theater credits ==
- Honour, Berkeley Repertory Theatre - director
- Continental Divide, Berkeley Repertory Theatre - director
- Surface Transit, Berkeley Repertory Theatre - director
- Cloud Nine, Berkeley Repertory Theatre - director
- Homebody/Kabul, Berkeley Repertory Theatre - director
- Culture Clash in AmeriCCa, Berkeley Repertory Theatre - director
- The Oresteia, Berkeley Repertory Theatre - director
- Ravenshead, Berkeley Repertory Theatre - director
- Pentecost, Slavs!, Berkeley Repertory Theatre - director
- The Caucasian Chalk Circle, Berkeley Repertory Theatre - director
- Endgame/Act Without Words, Berkeley Repertory Theatre - director
- Volpone, Berkeley Repertory Theatre - director
- The Convict’s Return, Berkeley Repertory Theatre - director
- Major Barbara, Berkeley Repertory Theatre - director
- Serious Money, Berkeley Repertory Theatre - director
- Waiting for Godot - director
- Othello, Oregon Shakespeare Festival - director
- Pentecost, Oregon Shakespeare Festival - director
- Coriolanus, Oregon Shakespeare Festival - director
- The Cure at Troy, Oregon Shakespeare Festival - director
- The Birthday Party and Execution of Justice, Berkeley Repertory Theatre
- Waiting for Godot (1989) - director
- Angels in America, Parts One and Two, Mark Taper Forum (1992) - director
- Brundibar (2006), New Victory Theater - director
- Zorro in Hell (2006) - director
- Wishful Drinking (2008), Berkeley Repertory Theatre - director
- Taking Over, (2009) - director
- Kiss My Aztec, (2019), Berkeley Repertory Theatre - director
