= Roxie Theater =

Movie theater in San Francisco, California

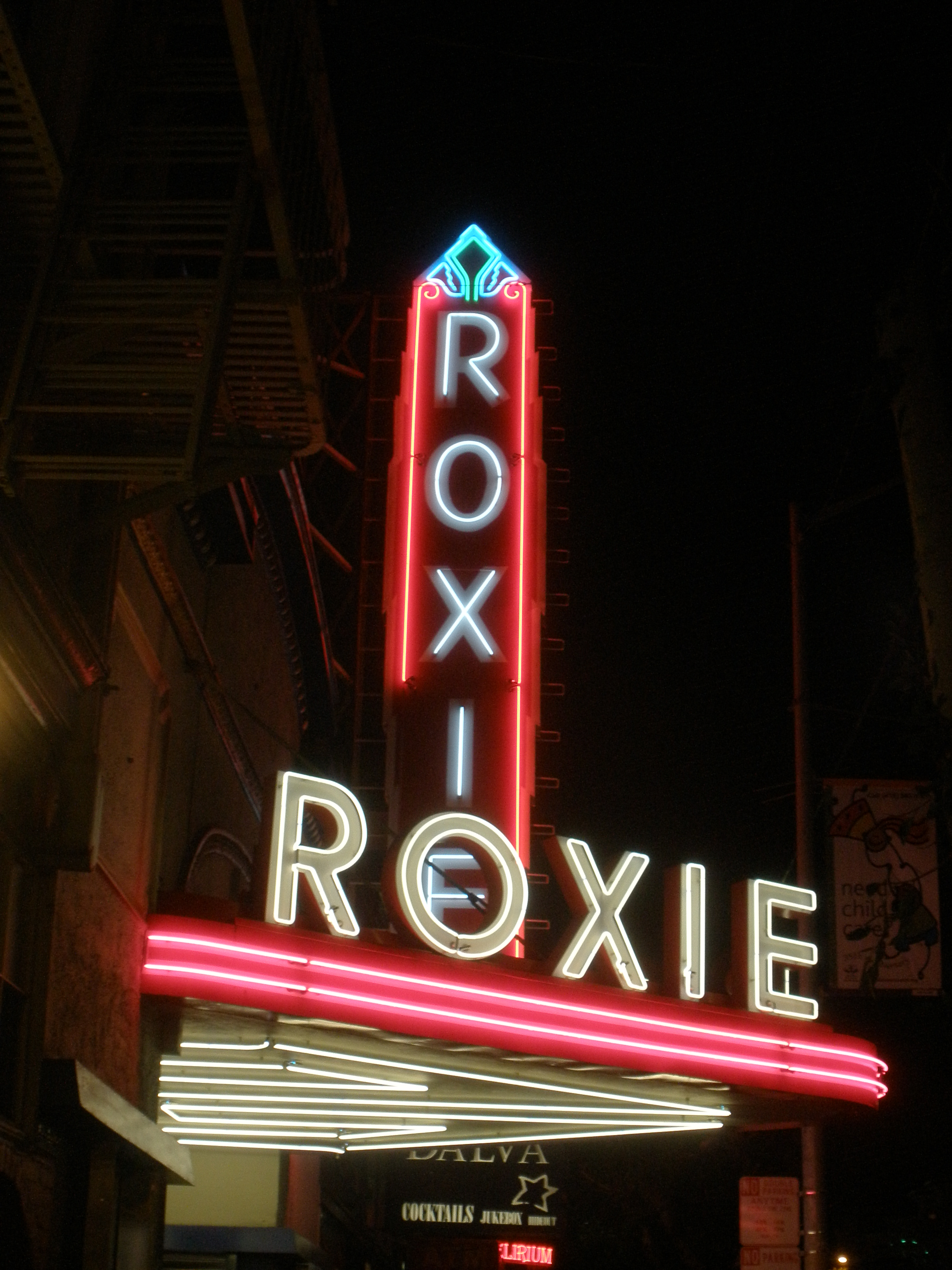
- The Roxie Theater marquee in 2009
- Interactive map of Roxie Theater
- Location: 3117 16th Street; San Francisco, California, U.S.
- Coordinates: 37°45′53″N 122°25′21″W
- Type: Movie theater

Construction
- Opened: 1912

Website
- www.roxie.com

The Roxie Theater, also known as the Roxie Cinema or just The Roxie, is a historic movie theater, founded in 1912, at 3117 16th Street in the Mission District of San Francisco. It is a non-profit community arthouse cinema.

== History ==
The Roxie is one of the oldest continuously operating movie theaters in the US, with its history tracing back to the early 1900s.

The 300-seat theater was renovated in 1933, changed its name to the Roxie, and added its unusual marquee with neon sign but no place for movie titles. In 2003, a 49-seat theater dubbed the Little Roxie opened two doors from the main theater.

Other names for the theater:

- The Poppy 1912–1916
- The New 16th Street 1916–1920
- The Rex 1920–1926
- The Gem 1926–1930
- The Gaiety 1930–1933
- The Roxie 1933–present

In the late 1960s with the decline of its neighborhood, The Roxie became a pornography theater. In March 1976, film lovers Robert Christopher Evans, Dick Gaikowski, Peter Moore, and Tom Mayer bought the Roxie, remodeled it, and turned it into an art and independent film center.

Between November 1–15, 1979, the Roxie hosted the U.S. premiere of Luis Buñuel's L'Âge d'Or (1930), a film that had been banned for almost 50 years.

Over the years, the Roxie has been home to many film festivals such as the Frameline Film Festival, San Francisco IndieFest, the San Francisco Jewish Film Festival, the Arab Film Festival, San Francisco Transgender Film Festival, and many others.

In December 2005, an agreement was announced under which the Roxie was acquired by New College of California, a small liberal arts college also based in the Mission District. It became part of New College's Media Studies Program on January 1, 2006, and was renamed the "Roxie Film Center at New College". An anonymous benefactor paid off the theater's debts, and the college registered it as a non-profit corporation.

On February 26, 2008, New College announced it was closing, thus ending its support of the Roxie. New College Board member Rod Holt and his son Alan subsequently took over the theater’s lease.

In 2010 Alan Holt transitioned from Executive Director to a seat on the Board and community activist and philanthropist Christopher Statton joined the Roxie as Executive Director and member of the Board. Megan Wilson, who began working for the Roxie as a development consultant, became a co-Executive Director; neither received a salary. Over his four-year tenure, Statton established the Roxie as a community-based non-profit, including the creation of the Roxie's Lights. Camera. Action! Awards to honor Bay Area social justice documentary filmmakers. The inaugural awards honored the filmmaking team of Rob Epstein and Jeffrey Friedman and filmmaker Hima B for their significant contributions in raising awareness of the challenges of living with HIV/AIDS. Statton also raised over $400,000 in contributions to help support the Roxie's programming and operations. In 2013 Statton was awarded the Marlon Riggs Award by the San Francisco Film Critics Circle for "his significant contribution to San Francisco’s film community through the Roxie Theater over the past four years". Statton resigned from the Roxie in 2013 due to health concerns.

In December 2013, the Roxie announced Isabel Fondevila, former Board President of Artists' Television Access, as the new director. She further expanded the theater's film festivals and developed RoxCine, an ongoing series of Spanish-language films.

In 2015, Dave Cowen came aboard as executive director, while Fondevila remained at the Roxie in the role of Director of Programming. Over the next two years, Cowen led the theater to profitability with projection and facilities improvements, an increased social media presence, and a successful focus on showing repertory film in 35mm. During this time, the Roxie's classic neon marquee was fully restored, and the Roxie was honored by the California State Assembly in 2017 as Small Business of the Year.

In August 2017, Sundance veteran Elizabeth O'Malley replaced Cowen as executive director, with Operations Director Lex Sloan promoted to general manager. Cowen remains on the Roxie Board of Directors and is now working with Milwaukee Film on their acquisition of the historic Oriental Theatre.

In 2024, a purchase agreement was signed with their landlord to purchase the building that houses the theater. Following a nearly year-long fundraising campaign, including donations from patrons, a successful purchase of the building was announced in July 2025.

== Roxie Releasing ==
The theatre also is home to Roxie Releasing, an independent film distributor most notably responsible for the 30th anniversary re-release of George A. Romero's Night of the Living Dead. Roxie Releasing specializes in documentaries.

=== Films released under Roxie Releasing ===
- Vincent: The Life and Death of Vincent Van Gogh (1987)
- Red Rock West (1993)
- Nico Icon (1995)
- Freeway (1996)
- Kurt & Courtney (1998)
- Megacities (1998)
- Genghis Blues (1999)
- Rivers and Tides (2001)
- Biggie & Tupac (2002)

== See also ==
- Castro Theatre
- Victoria Theatre
- Atheist Film Festival
