= Samuel Indratma =

Indonesian artist

Samuel Indratma (born December 22, 1970) in Central Java, Indonesia, is a community visual artist and muralist, who studied graphic art between 1990 and 1996 at the faculty of Fine Art, Indonesian Institute of the Arts, Yogyakarta, Indonesia.

== Biography ==
He was a prominent member of the left wing, activist group of artists, Apotik Komik, operating between 1997 and 2005, creating public art in Yogyakarta, Indonesia. The group considered their public art as a tool of social communication. Indratma also co-founded the Jogjakarta Mural Forum, which formed in 2005.

== Solo exhibitions ==
- Mural Blues (Yogyakarta, 1997)
- From Horror to Hope (Yogyakarta, 1998)
- Begadang III (Yogyakarta, 2001)
- The Interpretation of Sureq La Galigo (Singapore, 2004)
- Urban Apartment (Melbourne, 2007–2008)
- Agro Metal (Jogjakarta, 2009)

== Group exhibitions ==
- AWAS! Recent Art from Indonesia (Traveling exhibition, which visited Indonesia, Australia, Japan, and Europe (1999-2001))
- Four Member of Apotik Komik (Singapore, 2000)
- 36 Ideas from Asia: Contemporary South-east Asian Art (Traveling exhibition, which visited Singapore and Europe (2002-2003))
- Melbourne connection Asia (Melbourne, 2003)
- Exploring Vacuum II (Jogjakarta, 2003)
- CP Open Biennale 2003 (Jakarta, 2003)
- 15 Tracks: Contemporary Southeast Asian Art (Traveling exhibition, which visited Japan (2003-2004))
- Reformasi (Singapore, 2004)
- Olympics Art Exhibition (Jakarta, 2004)
- Contemporary Heroes (Yogyakarta, 2008)
- The Highlight (Yogyakarta, 2008)

== Art Projects ==
- Melayang (Exhibition of comic murals, Yogyakarta, 1997)
- Sakit Berlanjut (Public art project with venues in various public spaces of Yogyakarta, 1999)
- Les Paravent (Stage artistic for Theater Garasi, Jakarta, 2000)
- Galeri Publik Apotik Komic (Founding of a public street gallery for the duration of one year, involving input from six young artists from Jakarta and Jogjakarta, 2000–2001)
- Sama-sama City Mural Project (Various public spaces of Jogjakarta, 2002)
- Sama-sama / You're Welcome (Indonesian - American Art collaboration between Apotik Komik and the Clarion Alley Mural Project, San Francisco, various public spaces of Jogjakarta,).
- Intersection (San Francisco, 2003)
- Gesalt (Gestalt: (n)a configuration or pattern of elements so unified as a whole that it cannot be described merely as a sum of its parts., 2003)
- Art & Peace Project (Collaboration with Haverford college students, Pennsylvania, 2003)
- Tanda Mata Mural Art Projects (Workshop mural for 6 slum area in Jogjakarta, including at Fly Over Lempuyangan, 2007–2008)
- Kode Post Sign Art Projects (Workshop Sign Art for 12 kampong in Jogjakarta, 2008)
- School Art Project (Workshop involving high school students to make sculpture for public spaces, 2008)

== Residencies ==
- 2003 : Clarion Alley Mural, San Francisco for 2 months.
- 2007 : ArtPlay Melbourne and Tasmania for 2 months.
