= Dow Wilson =

American trade unionist and activist

Dow Wilson was an American trade unionist and activist for union democracy. He was secretary of the International Union of Painters and Allied Trades Local #4, based in San Francisco, when he was assassinated by a shotgun blast on April 5, 1966, near the San Francisco Labor Temple. A month later, Lloyd Green, president of the nearby Hayward, California local and a colleague of Wilson's, was also assassinated.
