= Clarion Alley Mural Project =

Public art initiative

Clarion Alley Mural Project (CAMP) is an artists' collective in San Francisco's Mission District. CAMP is a community, a public space, and an organizing force that uses public art (murals, street art, performance art, dance, poster projects, literary events) as a vehicle for social, economic, racial, and environmental justice messaging and storytelling. The project is currently co-directed by Megan Wilson and Christopher Statton with a board of directors that includes Wilson, Statton, Shaghayegh Cyrous, Keyvan Shovir, Ivy McClelland, Kyoko Sato, Fara Akrami, Katayoun Bahrami, and Chris Gazaleh. Clarion Alley runs one block (560 ft long and 15 ft. wide) in San Francisco's inner Mission District between 17th and 18th streets and Mission and Valencia streets.

== Origins ==
CAMP was formed in October 1992 by a volunteer collective of six residents of the North Mission District, San Francisco: Aaron Noble, Michael O'Connor, Sebastiana Pastor, Rigo 92, Mary Gail Snyder, and Aracely Soriano. Inspired by Balmy Alley and other murals and muralists of San Francisco's Mission District, CAMP came together to initiate a mural project on Clarion Alley. At the time, two of the founders were living on the alley, while another had helped found the Balmy Alley project.

== See also ==
- Mission School
