= Shaghayegh Cyrous =

Iranian-American artist, curator, educator

- شقایق سیروس
- Cyrous in 2026
- Born: 1987 (age 38–39); Tehran, Iran
- Education: University of Science and Culture (BA), California College of Arts (MFA)
- Occupations: Visual artist, curator Transdisciplinary
- Known for: Social practice art, video art, contemporary art, installation art
- Movement: Social practice art, video art
- Website: www.shcyrous.com

Shaghayegh Cyrous (Persian: شقایق سیروس; born 1987) is an Iranian-American visual artist, curator, and educator based in Los Angeles. Her transdisciplinary practice encompasses multimedia installation, performance art, painting, video art, and social practice. Her work explores identity, displacement, cultural memory, and belonging, drawing on Persian mythology and cultural traditions.

== Early life and education ==
Cyrous was born in Tehran, Iran, in 1987, during the final year of the Iran–Iraq War (1980–1988).and moved to the United States in 2011, following the Iranian Green Movement. She initially lived in the San Francisco Bay Area for 10 years before relocating to Los Angeles.

She received her bachelor's degree in Visual Art from the Science and Culture University in Tehran and her Master of Fine Arts (MFA) in Social Practice from the California College of the Arts in San Francisco.

== Artistic practice ==
Cyrous is a transdisciplinary artist working across multimedia installation, performance, painting, and social practice. Her work draws on mythology, nature, and social and political power dynamics to explore themes of identity, belonging, spirituality, and connections across time and culture.

Through poetic imagery, theatrical environments, and participatory practices, her work engages with narratives drawn from mythology, poetry, and histories of resistance. Her installations bring together ancient cultural traditions and contemporary experiences, incorporating painting, installation, video, sound, and performance.

in 2016, her work A Window to Tehran used a video diptych synchronizing the San Francisco sunrise with the Tehran sunset, addressing the temporal and geographical distance between the two cities.

In 2019, Cyrous created The Sun Will Rise the Next Day, a video installation incorporating the names of political prisoners incarcerated in Iran between the Iranian Green Movement and 2019.

Her later multimedia installations have incorporated imagery from Zoroastrian cosmology and the Bundahishn, alongside references to Iranian cultural identity and diaspora.

== Public art and murals ==
Cyrous has created several public artworks addressing Iranian cultural identity, literature, and political expression. In 2015, Cyrous painted the mural In Memory Of in Clarion Alley in San Francisco. The mural depicts three Iranian women writers: Simin Daneshvar, Simin Behbahani, and Forough Farrokhzad.

Cyrous had previously created another mural in Clarion Alley portraying writers and artists imprisoned in Iran. She also installed her Lost Rug Project in the alley.

Her work has also appeared in public billboard projects, including Netflix's Invisible Billboard and a billboard presented by the City of West Hollywood in Los Angeles.

== Exhibitions ==
Cyrous has exhibited and performed internationally at venues including the Tehran Museum of Contemporary Art, the British Museum in London, the Asian Art Museum in San Francisco, Institut für Alles Mögliche in Berlin, the Anchorage Museum in Alaska, and Salesforce Tower in San Francisco.

=== Solo exhibitions ===
In 2026, Cyrous presented Through the Sun, a solo exhibition at Reisig and Taylor Contemporary in Los Angeles, from August 15 to September 19. The exhibition incorporated painting and multimedia installation, drawing on Iranian mythology, Zoroastrian cosmology, and Ferdowsi's Shahnameh.

During the same year, she presented Breathe the Sun at Telematic Media Arts in San Francisco, from September 11 to October 31. The exhibition incorporated video projection, painting, sculptural objects, and sound, drawing on ancient Persian cultural traditions and Zoroastrian mythology.

Art critic Caroline Picard reviewed Breathe the Sun in Squarecylinder, discussing its use of ritual, imagery from the Bundahishn, and the relationship between cultural memory and the Iranian diaspora.

Jonathan Curiel, writing for Roborant Review, interpreted the exhibition as a form of anti-war art, examining how Cyrous used music, dance, and ancestral traditions to address contemporary events affecting Iran.

== Curatorial work ==
=== Exhibitions and film ===
In 2015, Cyrous co-curated Inside Out Iran, an exhibition of Iranian urban art in London.

She was the executive producer of Mutiny of Colours, a feature-length documentary film about street art and graffiti in Iran.

In 2017, Cyrous curated the video exhibition Eleven and a Half Hours in Oakland, California, featuring works by Iranian artist Shirin Abedinirad and American artist Dionne Lee. The exhibition explored cultural and geographical connections between Iran and Oakland. Its title referred to the eleven-and-a-half-hour time difference between San Francisco and Tehran.

=== Zamin Project ===
In August 2021, Cyrous founded Zamin Project, an initiative connecting artists and educators from the Southwest Asian and North African (SWANA) community in the San Francisco Bay Area. Its activities have included discussion panels, artist interviews, and the Zamin Project Archive.

The project was featured in Hyperallergic in an article examining barriers faced by SWANA artists and the importance of community-led artistic networks.

== Notable works ==
- 2014 - Klozar Weaving, Iran and California
- 2015 - In Memory Of (mural), Clarion Alley, San Francisco, California
- 2015 - Inside Out Iran (exhibition curator), London, UK
- 2016 - A Window to Tehran, Root Division’s galleries, San Francisco, California
- 2017 - Eleven and a Half Hours (exhibition curator), Oakland, California
- 2018 - Over Here Not Yet (collaborative work with Renée Rhodes), Royal NoneSuch Gallery, Oakland, California
- 2018 - East of West, Santa Fe, New Mexico
- 2019 - Rock E Malta (collaborative work with Kim Epifano)
- 2019 - The sun will rise the next day, (video installation) at Minnesota Street Project, San Francisco, California
- 2019 - “Rock & Mortar” (video installation) for a performance at Epiphany Dance Theater, San Francisco, California
- 2020 - Reenacting the Future, San Francisco Bay Area, California

== See also ==
- List of Iranian women artists
