= Shirin Abedinirad =

Iranian artist (born 1986)

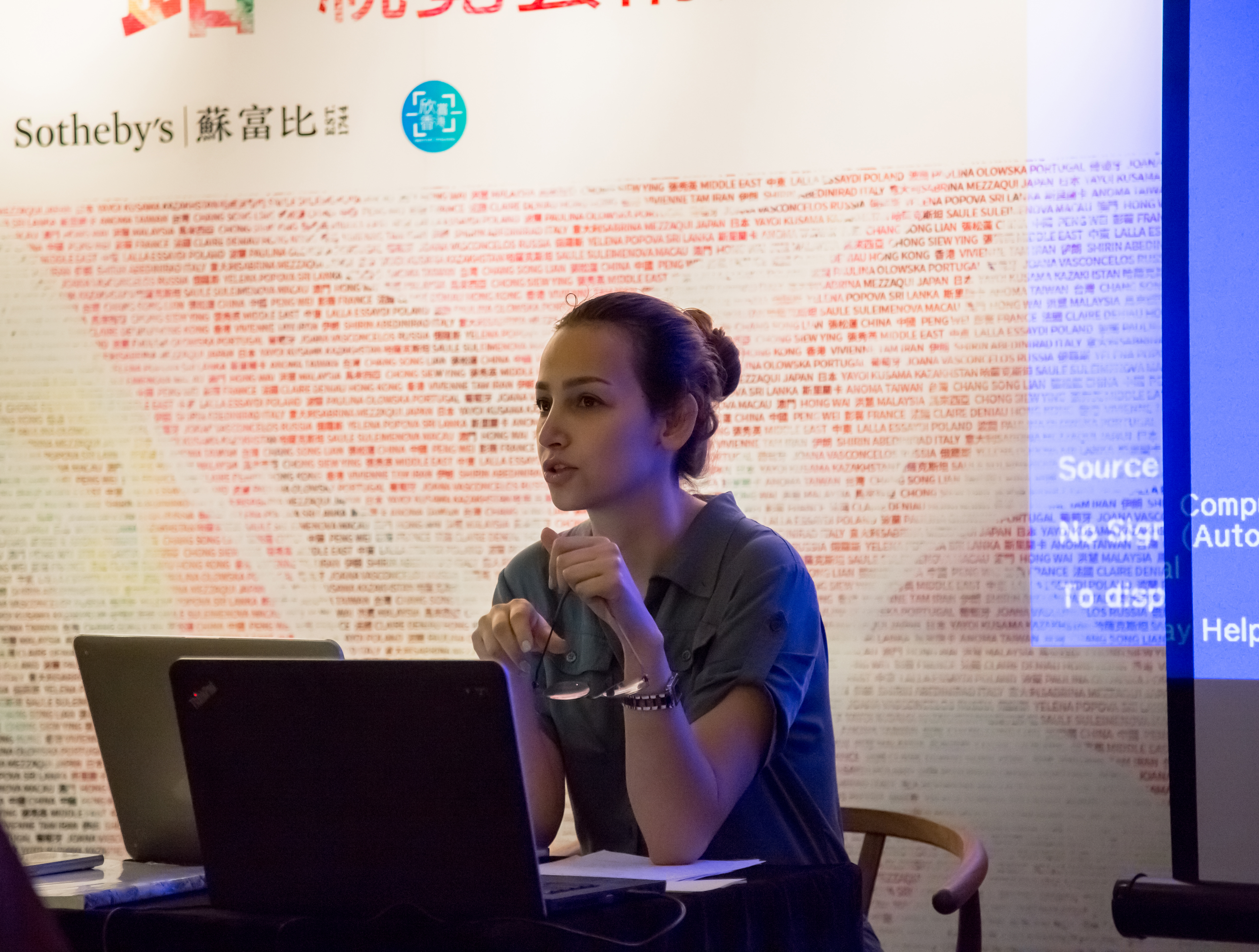
- Abedinirad at Sotheby’s Hong Kong Gallery, 2016.
- Born: 1986 (age 39–40); Tabriz, East Azerbaijan Province, Iran
- Education: Michigan State University (MFA, 2024); Shariaty Technical College, Tehran (BA, 2014)
- Known for: Installation art, Land art, Conceptual art
- Notable work: Babel Tower (2015); Mirrored Ziggurat (2015); Reflective Journey (2023-2024)
- Awards: ArtPrize Installation Public Award (2024); International Sculpture Center Honorable Mention (2023); Fabrica Research Centre Scholarship (2014)
- Website: www.shirinabedinirad.com

Shirin Abedinirad (born 1986) is an Iranian contemporary artist and assistant professor at Utah Valley University. She is known for her large-scale mirror installations, conceptual art, and land art projects that explore themes of nature, spirituality, and optical illusions. Since 2024, she has served as assistant professor in the Department of Art & Design at Utah Valley University. In 2023, she appeared as an actress in Ali Ahmadzadeh's film Critical Zone, which won the Golden Leopard at the Locarno Film Festival.

== Early life and education ==
Abedinirad was born in 1986 in Tabriz, Iran. She began her artistic practice with painting in 2002. She earned an associate degree in Graphic Design from Ardabil Vocational College for Girls (2003–2005) and a Bachelor of Arts in Fashion and Textile Design from Shariaty Technical College in Tehran (2009–2014), where her thesis examined the relationship between conceptual art and fashion design.

In 2013, she participated in a visual arts workshop led by renowned Iranian filmmaker Abbas Kiarostami. From 2021 to 2024, she pursued a Master of Fine Arts in Studio Art at Michigan State University, graduating with her thesis project "Reflective Journey."

== Artistic practice ==
Abedinirad's work primarily consists of site-specific installations using mirrors and reflective materials to create optical illusions and connect natural environments with human perception. Her installations often incorporate geometric forms inspired by Islamic architecture, particularly ziggurats and pyramids, which she covers with mirrors to reflect and fragment the surrounding landscape.

Her artistic philosophy centers on creating "a transcendental experience" through the manipulation of light, reflection, and space. She has stated that her work aims to "connect the earth to the sky" and create moments of contemplation about humanity's relationship with nature.

== Career ==
=== Academic career ===
In 2024, Abedinirad joined Utah Valley University as assistant professor in the Department of Art & Design, where she teaches courses in Fiber Art, Sculpture III, and 3D Design. Prior to this appointment, she served as instructor of Record for Three-Dimensional Form at Michigan State University (2022–2023).

=== Major installations ===
Abedinirad's first major outdoor installation, Narcissus (2013), was created in Iran's Central Desert, featuring a spiral staircase covered in mirrors. This was followed by Evocation (2013), also in the Central Desert, which established her signature approach of using mirrors to create illusions in natural landscapes.

In 2014, while on scholarship at Fabrica Research Centre in Italy, she created Heaven on Earth, an installation that brought her mirror work into an interior space. Her international breakthrough came with Mirrored Ziggurat (2015) at the Underbelly Arts Festival on Cockatoo Island, Sydney, which gained widespread media attention.

Babel Tower (2015), created in collaboration with Italian designer Gugo Torelli, became one of her most recognized works. The installation featured a pyramidal structure covered in mirrors that rotated to create kinetic reflections. The image was later selected as the cover for Stanford University Press's book "Archaeology of Babel: The Colonial Foundation of the Humanities" by Siraj Ahmed.

Her work Revision (2018) was featured at the Lorne Sculpture Biennale in Australia, while Reflective Journey (2023–2024) has been shown at multiple international venues including the Oku-Noto Triennale in Japan and as a VR installation at Art Dubai Digital.

=== Film career ===
In 2023, Abedinirad made her acting debut in Ali Ahmadzadeh's film Critical Zone (Persian: منطقه بحرانی). The film won the Golden Leopard at the Locarno Film Festival. The Hollywood Reporter described the film as "an innovative and provocative cri de coeur."

== Works ==
=== Selected installations ===
- Narcissus (2013) – First outdoor installation in Iran's Central Desert
- Evocation (2013) – Central Desert, Iran
- Heaven on Earth (2014) – Fabrica, Treviso, Italy
- Mirrored Ziggurat (2015) – Underbelly Arts Festival, Cockatoo Island, Sydney, Australia
- Babel Tower (2015) – Collaboration with Gugo Torelli
- Revision (2018) – Lorne Sculpture Biennale, Australia
- Tide (2019) – Swell Sculpture Festival, Currumbin Beach, Australia
- The Magic of Reflection (2022) – Istanbul Airport, Turkey
- Reflective Journey (2023–2024) – Multi-location installation

== Exhibitions ==
=== Solo exhibitions ===
- 2024: Reflective Journey, Kates-Ferri Projects Gallery, New York (curated by Micaela Giovannotti)
- 2023: Reflective Journey, Sanji Gallery, Seoul, South Korea (curated by Juli Cho Bailer and Micaela Giovannotti)
- 2022: Women Hair Freedom, Kresge Art Center, MSU, Michigan
- 2022: Collective Reflection, Girls Monastery, Trabzon, Turkey (curated by Ayca Okay)

=== Selected group exhibitions ===
- 2024: Art Field Nanhai 2024, Public Art, Foshan, China
- 2024: Creative Confluence, Philips Los Angeles, California
- 2023: Heaven on Earth #3, Lumiere Festival, Durham, UK
- 2022: On the Edge of Senses, Times Art Museum, Beijing and Chengdu, China
- 2018: I SEE, I AM, SETAREH X Gallery, Düsseldorf (curated by Shahram Karimi)
- 2017: In Between (Part II): So Far, Mana Contemporary (curated by Shahram Karimi)
- 2016: One Belt One Road Visual Arts Exhibition, Sotheby's Hong Kong Gallery (with Yayoi Kusama and Joana Vasconcelos)
- 2016: The Absence of Paths, Tunisian Pavilion at La Biennale di Venezia (curated by Lina Lazaar)

== Publications ==
- Abedinirad, Shirin (2016). Fashion & Conceptual Art in 21st Century (in Persian) (6th ed.). Tehran: Nazar Art Publication. p. 216.

== Awards and recognition ==
- 2024: ArtPrize Installation Public Award, Grand Rapids, USA
- 2024: Featured Public Projects Grant, ArtPrize
- 2024: Frederik Meijer Gardens Sculpture Grant, ArtPrize
- 2023: Honorable Mention, Outstanding Student Achievement in Contemporary Sculpture Awards, International Sculpture Center
- 2023: Multiple fellowships from Michigan State University including Dissertation Completion Fellowship
- 2014: Fabrica Research Centre Scholarship, Treviso, Italy
- 2010: Winner, First Ever-Global Online New Face Casting for Benetton

== Selected bibliography ==
Abedinirad's work has been featured in numerous books and publications:

- Petry, Michael. Mirror: Mirror – The Reflecting Surface in Contemporary Art. London: Thames and Hudson, 2024.
- Banks, Grace. Art Escapes: Hidden Art Experiences Outside the Museum. Berlin: Gestalten, 2022.
- Mestaoui, Linda. Green Art: La nature, milieu et matière de creation. France: Editions Alternatives Gallimard, 2018.

Her work has been covered by major publications including Wired, The Paris Review, and featured in international magazines across Germany, Switzerland, France, and Mexico.
