= Clarion Alley =

Street in San Francisco

Clarion Alley is a small street between Mission and Valencia Streets and 17th and 18th Streets in the Mission District in San Francisco, California. It is notable for the murals painted by the Clarion Alley Mural Project.

Map

== History ==
Originally called "Cedar Lane," the alley's name was changed around the turn of the twentieth century to Clarion Alley. The street is notable for community and arts activity, including the Clarion Alley Mural Project, the American Indian Center and Promotoras Latinas Comunitarias de Salud.

== 47 Clarion ==
The warehouse at 47 Clarion was originally known as the Woodmen Building with the main door at 3345 17th Street. It was an IWW meeting hall, where Tom Mooney once attempted to organize railway workers. Later, it was home to artists and musicians from at least the early sixties through 2002. Notable residents included Terry Riley, The Cockettes, Lise Swenson of Artists' Television Access, and two of the artists, Rigo 23 and Aaron Noble, who were founding members of the Clarion Alley Mural Project. 47 Clarion was demolished in 2001, and a parking lot for the condominium project on 17th Street replaced it. It became a symbol of the neighborhood's gentrification.

== Murals ==
Since 1992, the alley has been covered in murals painted by the Clarion Alley Mural Project. Alley residents Noble and Rigo together painted the mural "Superhero Warehouse" showing a series of depressed superheroes on the warehouse's side, as a contribution to the mural project. Another of the early murals, painted by Scott Williams after research done by Fred Rinne, depicted native animals of the Mission District.

== Dog Days ==
Clarion Alley was featured in the opening chapter of the fiction novel Dog Days by John Levitt. The main character is ambushed by evil forces that animate one of the murals into a monstrous force.
