= Community Housing Partnership =

American nonprofit organization

Community Housing Partnership is a nonprofit organization in San Francisco, California, that provides housing, job training and other services to people formerly living in homelessness. Founded in 1990, it owns and operates 14 residential buildings and collaborates with other organizations in its goals.

== Purpose ==
The organization offers housing, job training, case management, community organizing, resident engagement and other support services to the formerly homeless. It began "with the idea that many homeless people suffer posttraumatic stress disorder and that this cycle wouldn't be broken unless they have a longer-term supportive community to live in." Since Community Housing Partnership was founded in 1990, more than a thousand housing units have been provided to help over 2,200 people. It is one of the city's "largest supportive-housing providers," and it provides specialized services for people with disabilities and mental-health or substance-abuse challenges.

== History ==
Community Housing Partnership sprang from the destruction wreaked upon San Francisco by the massive Loma Prieta earthquake of October 1989, which damaged or destroyed scores of buildings and left some twelve thousand people homeless. "Almost all of the homeless shelters I worked with had to empty out because they were in bad shape," recalled Paul Boden, organizing director of the Western Regional Advocacy Project. In the earthquake aftermath, some financial support became available for property owners and renters with long-term leases, but no help was forthcoming for the homeless and low-income residents. A Navy aircraft carrier entered San Francisco Bay to provide some shelter for the homeless, Boden said.

Boden and fellow board members of the Coalition on Homelessness Joe Wilson, Greg Francis and Laura Ware had earlier written a proposal for San Francisco to build permanent housing for the homeless "instead of just temporary shelters." San Francisco Mayor Art Agnos allocated some $2.2 million from the city's earthquake relief fund to put the proposal into action. A year later, Community Housing Partnership was opened.

In 2014 it had a staff of more than 280, "many of whom have experienced homelessness first-hand." It had an annual operating budget of about $25 million.

== Projects ==
Community Housing Partnership owns and operates the first new residential building in the San Francisco Transbay development area south of Mission Street, the Rene Cazenave Apartments, which has 120 units of supportive housing for the "chronically homeless." The eight-story, $42.7 million building was designed by Leddy Maytum Stacy Architects, which joined not only with Community Housing Partnership but also with Bridge Housing in the development. Architectural Record noted that "the building’s first-floor plan encourages residents to take advantage of support services such as substance abuse counseling and psychotherapy, placing them prominently along the primary circulation corridor. This internal “Main Street” is wide and daylit through 7.5-foot-diameter skylights." The magazine quoted architect Richard Stacy as saying: “We wanted to get away from the idea that there was any stigma attached to using these services.”

The units are modestly sized—most are 320-foot studios—but pleasantly bright, with floor-to-ceiling windows. The apartments, conceived by associate architects Saida + Sullivan Design Partners, have thoughtful touches like up- and down-lighting in the kitchen, to set apart that area from the rest of the apartment’s entry hall. The residents pay 30 percent of their income in rent, an average of $375 a month. The units are arranged along double-loaded corridors in groups of four to provide a sense of community within the larger whole. The massing breaks down into four smaller towers connected by elevators, stairs, and utility rooms. In some places, the towers are bridged by additional living space, creating horizontal bands that add to the diversity of the facade, which is clad in aqua-colored and naturally gray fiber-cement rainscreen panels.

In 2014 Community Housing Partnership, with its thousand units of "supportive housing," began working on a plan to "free up" at least 100 units each year by moving residents out of them into "below-market-rate housing, public housing or market-rate" rentals, thus making room for new tenants to begin a climb up a "housing ladder," said Executive Director Gail Gilman.

In the same year, Community Housing Partnership was a collaborator with the city, Larkin Street Youth Services and neighborhood groups in the transformation of the Edward II Inn from a 1914-era tourist hotel into a 24-unit supportive-housing site for "transitional-age youths" aged 18 to 24, with residents paying 30 percent of their adjusted income as rent. It opened in 2014 in the Marina-Cow Hollow area, with a community kitchen and private baths. Also in 2014, Community Housing Partnership opened a new 2,800-square-foot training center focused on training in basic customer-service and computer skills.

By July 2012 the organization had trained about a hundred formerly homeless people in a 10-week program that taught them how to teach their neighbors about compost collection and recycling practice. The San Francisco Chronicle reported that:

Enrollees, who are not paid for their work, learn about resource conservation, environmental justice and urban agriculture, and receive basic job support, including computer skills and an overview of the green jobs sector. As part of the program, they're also required to provide zero-waste outreach within their buildings, playing a critical role in bringing the city's subsidized, low-income housing in line with mandatory composting and recycling laws.

In 2007 the organization began a partnership with nonprofit REDF to begin a "social venture" called Solutions SF, dedicated to training and employing the formerly homeless for jobs in "lobby service," which entailed serving at the front desk of "affordable and supportive housing" buildings. Some clients were also hired as full-time employees in property management businesses in San Francisco, and they all learned "customer-service skills that are transferable to other fields," said Gail Gilman, Community Housing Partnership's executive director.
