= The Lab (organization) =

San Francisco not-for-profit arts organization and performance space

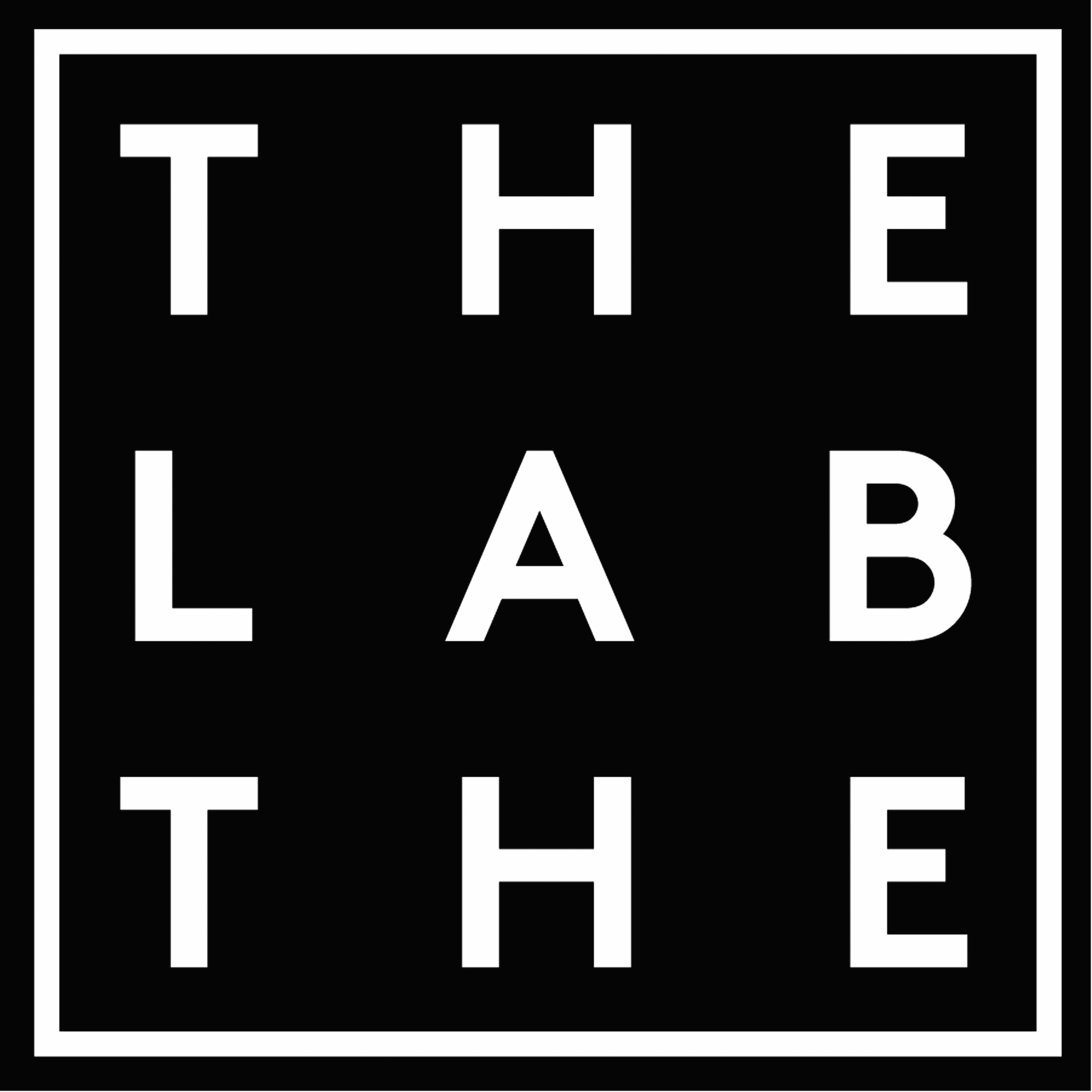

- Location within San Francisco County Location within California Location within the United States
- Established: 1984
- Location: 2948 16th Street, San Francisco, California, United States
- Coordinates: 37.765°N 122.419°W
- Type: Non-profit visual, performing arts space, artist residency
- Director: Andrew C. Smith
- Website: thelab.org

The Lab (formerly Co-LAB) is a not-for-profit arts organization, performance space, and artist residency located in the Redstone Building in San Francisco's Mission District. Since 1984, The Lab has hosted performances and projects by artists including Nan Goldin, Barbara Kruger, David Wojnarowicz, Barry McGee, Kim Gordon and Kathleen Hanna.

== History ==
It was founded in 1984 as Co-LAB by a group of five art students (Laura Brun, John DiStefano, Tami Logan, Alan Millar, and Nomi Seidman) from San Francisco State University. It changed its name from Co-Lab to The Lab in 1985.

Its original site was at 1805 and 1807 Divisadero Street; in 1995 it moved to the Redstone Building in the Mission District. In 2018 the organization began paying fees of $25,000 to $75,000 to artists in residence. In 2019, in collaboration with the Mission Economic Development Agency, it launched a campaign to purchase the Redstone building.
