= Coalition on Homelessness, San Francisco =

Advocacy organization

The Coalition on Homelessness is an American homeless advocacy and social justice organization that focuses on creating long-term solutions to homelessness, poverty, and housing issues in San Francisco, California. Founded in 1987, the group also founded the newspaper Street Sheet and the Community Housing Partnership. It is based on Turk Street in the Tenderloin district.

== History ==
=== Origin and early years (1987–1990) ===
The Coalition was formed in 1987 from a collaboration of San Francisco service providers and homeless people. It was created in reaction to cuts of social service programs by the Reagan administration. The original idea for the Coalition on Homelessness was shared at Hospitality House and the Tenderloin Housing Clinic.

In 1989, the Street Sheet was founded.

=== 1990s ===
In 1990, following the Loma Prieta Earthquake, the Coalition created the first supportive housing for homeless people in San Francisco as Community Housing Partnership, providing permanent affordable housing and services such as employment opportunities, job training, and case management.

In 1996, the Coalition fought against the city's “Matrix Program,” an initiative of Mayor Frank Jordan’s aimed at addressing homelessness through police and criminalization, including getting 39,000 tickets dismissed in court and the eventual end of the program.

=== 2010s ===
In 2015 the Coalition released two reports: “The Roadmap,” a five-year plan to end homelessness.
