= Artists' Television Access =

Art gallery and screening venue in San Francisco

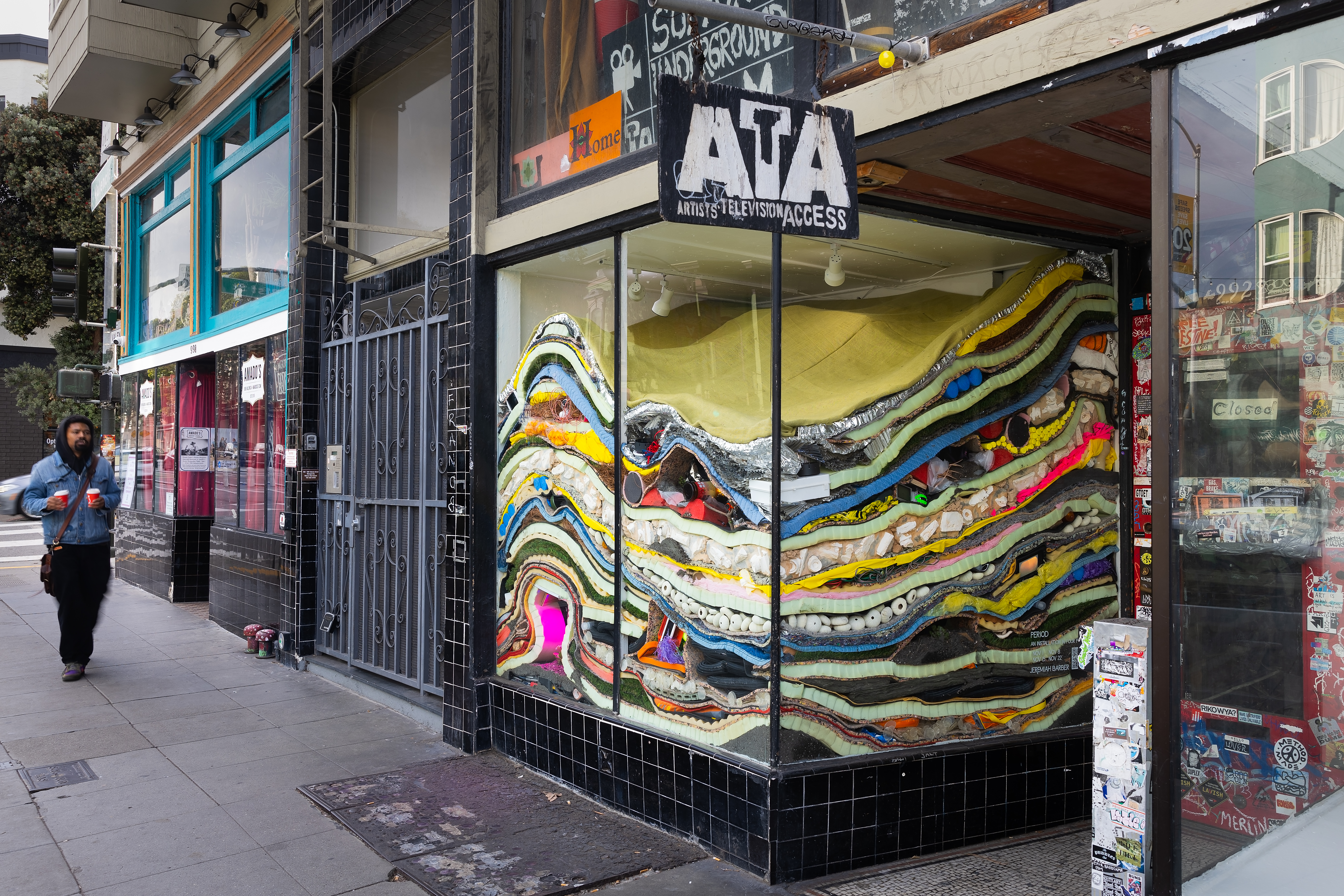
Artists' Television Access location at 992 Valencia Street

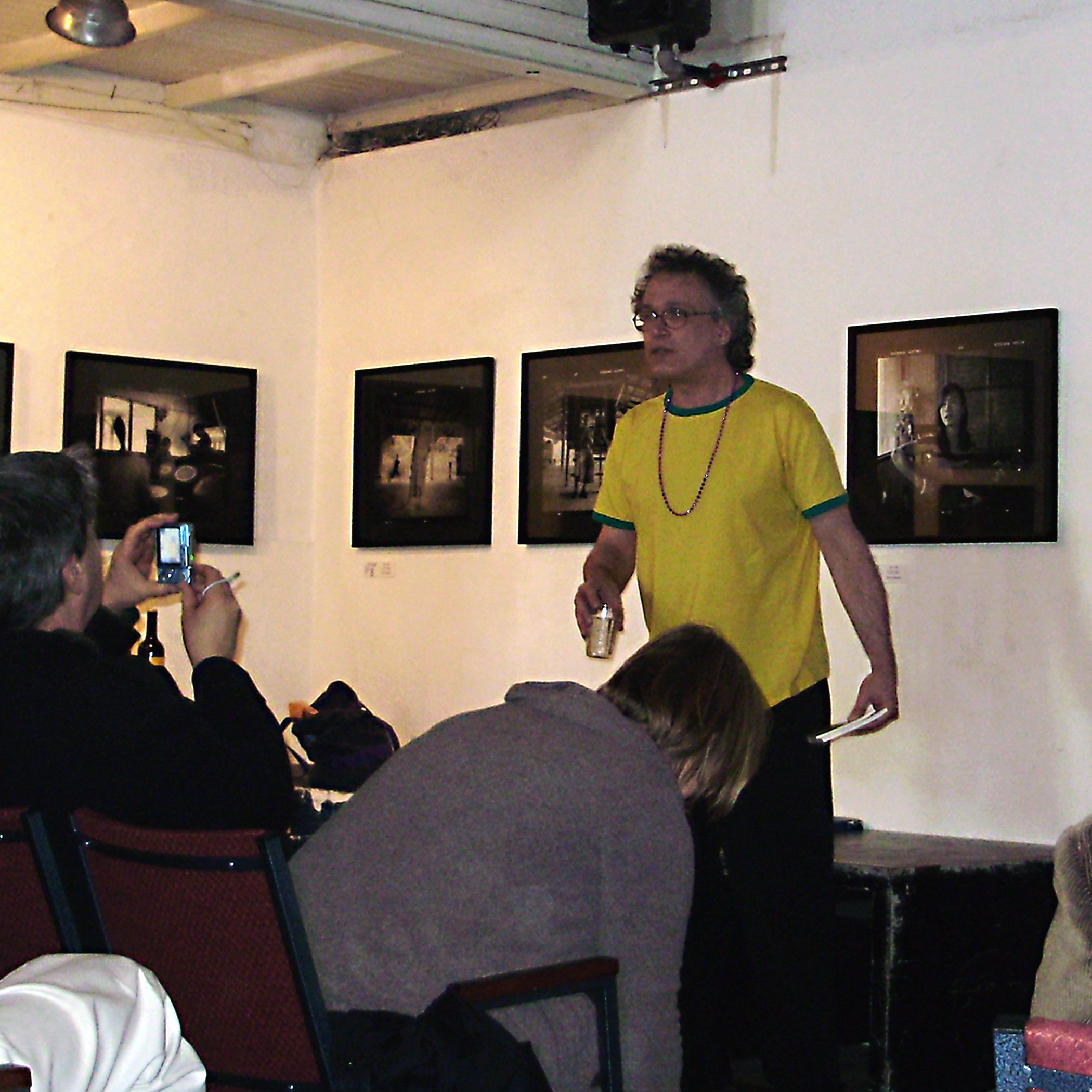
Canadian poet Colin Smith, reciting poetry, Artists' Television Access

Artists' Television Access (ATA) is a non-profit art gallery and screening venue in San Francisco's Mission District in the United States of America. ATA exhibits work by emerging, independent and experimental artists in its theatre and gallery space as well as on its weekly Public-access television cable TV show and webzine. The Other Cinema series is hosted seasonally every Saturday night by experimental filmmaker and artist-in-residence Craig Baldwin.

== History ==
ATA was established in 1984 by artists John Martin and Marshall Weber as a performance art space, screening venue and gallery and included an affordable video production facility located on 7th Street in San Francisco's South of Market (SOMA) district. It was one of the first organizations in San Francisco to consistently promote the work of video artists. Other artists associated with the early days of ATA include Craig Baldwin, Lise Swenson, Phil Patiris, Eva König, Rigo 23, Fred Rinne, Scott Williams and Dale Hoyt.

In a 2014 KQED profile celebrating ATA's 30th anniversary Mark Taylor writes "The secret sauce for ATA was that it became a 'horizontal equalizer' for any artist from any background in the city of San Francisco. You had access to ATA. There were no filters. There was a lot of volunteerism and a great activist board. And there were hundreds of shows a year." Taylor continues, "it actually integrated with the local communities -- certainly with the Latino and queer communities, parts of the Asian community and to a lesser extent the African American community. . . While there is a core ATA audience that is interested in discovery and open to checking out new things, this strong connection to multiple communities has also assured the organization's survival. . . the audience at ATA was always expanding."

== Programming ==
David Buuck writes, "The Right Window at Artists’ Television Access is a large window display in the Mission District of San Francisco curated by a rotating collective of local artists and curators. Exhibitions have consistently explored the fact that the site is “open to the public” (pedestrians and street traffic) 24/7 and is lit by natural light during the day and illuminated by the city at night.”
