= DIY America =

- Genre: Documentary
- Created by: Aaron Rose
- Directed by: Aaron Rose
- Country of origin: United States
- Original language: English
- No. of seasons: 1
- No. of episodes: 12

Production
- Executive producers: for BlackLake Productions: Jon Barlow, Arlo Rosner for Sidetrack Films: Jared Moshe, Ravi Anne for WKE: Bill Davenport, Janice Grube, Aaron Rose
- Running time: 2 – 5 minutes
- Production companies: BlackLake Productions; Sidetrack Films

Original release
- Network: Wieden+Kennedy Entertainment
- Release: December 2009 – May 2010

D.I.Y. America is a 2009 web video documentary series by director Aaron Rose which premiered on December 1, 2009, on Wieden+Kennedy Entertainment's website.

== Subject Matter ==
The series is a documentary based exploration into the American subcultures of skateboarding, graffiti, street art, punk and hip hop, focusing on topics like creativity and perseverance.

D.I.Y. America was assembled using additional footage shot, but never included, in Beautiful Losers.

== Episodes ==
No.	Title	Original release date
1	"Skate and Create: Part One: Being an Outsider"	December 1, 2009
Skate and Create explores the strange hybrid of skateboarding and creativity. The first episode of part one explores the fundamental basics of this connection, speaking to skate/music/film icons such as Tony Hawk, Thurston Moore, Jason Lee, Shepard Fairey, and others. The second half gets into the subject of "Outsiderness" and how both skateboarders and artists find a surrogate family based on their mutual alienation. Featuring Andy Jenkins, Harmony Korine, Chris Johanson, Larry Clark and Chris Pastras
2	"Swoon"	December 8, 2009
The camera follows Swoon around her native Brooklyn one afternoon as she puts up pieces in the street and talks about her work.
3	"Skate and Create: Part Two: Perseverance"	December 22, 2009
Part 2 of the Skate and Create series focuses on the steep learning curve in skateboarding and how it affects creativity. Skateboarders and creatives such as Tommy Guerrero, Ray Barbee, Geoff McFetridge, Thomas Campbell and others talk about the idea that "falling down" is okay.
4	"Skate and Create: Part Three: Terrain"	January 12, 2010
Part 3 of the Skate and Create series explores "the skaters' gaze"—the way a skateboarder looks at the urban environment in a completely different way from others: to be experienced rather than just be used. Includes interviews with musicians Ian MacKaye and Thurston Moore, pro skater Tommy Guerrero and Fausto Vitello (founder of Thrasher magazine).
5	"Os Gêmeos"	January 26, 2010
This episode meets with Os Gêmeos, identical twin brothers from São Paulo, Brazil. Stylistically, Os Gêmeos are heavily influenced by the cryptic art of the São Paulo–based pichação (graffiti) movement as well as American hip-hop, which the twins grew up with in Brazil. The brothers have gained international fame, displaying their work in exhibitions in major cities in the U.S. and Europe, including Deitch Projects in New York and Tate Modern in London.
6	"Skate and Create: Part Four: Artists"	February 9, 2010
The fourth installment of Skate and Create talks to and about the wide range of visual artists who have spawned from skate culture. We talk about the artistic temperament and how it applies to being a skateboarder, as well as different applications of creativity in graphics, painting, and other forms of fine art.
7	"Skate and Create: Part Five: The Photographers"	February 23, 2010
This episode features three generations of skateboard photographers in the trio of Craig Stecyk (1970s), Glen E. Friedman (1980s) and Tobin Yelland (1990s)—the latter also happens to be the show's cinematographer.
8	"Skate and Create: Part Six: Selling Out"	March 9, 2010
Craig Stecyk, Damon Way, Harmony Korine, Tony Hawk, Fausto Vitello, Ray Barbee, Tommy Guerrero and Chris Pastras give their opinions about selling out in the skateboarding community and how skateboarding has gone from an underground scene to a mainstream affair.
9	"Graffiti: Part One: Roots and Drive"	March 23, 2010
Craig Stecyk, KR, Todd James, Sleezer, ESPO and Earsnot talk about the history and spread of graffiti, as well as what motivates them to create graffiti.
10	"Graffiti: Part Two: Legal vs. Illegal"	April 6, 2010
Artists Sace, Abhor, Amaze, Deadcat, Sleezer and Earsnot talk about legal versus illegal graffiti.
11	"Graffiti: Part Three: Broom and Brush Brigade"	April 20, 2010
Part 3 of the Graffiti series highlights the graffiti removal crew from San Francisco's Department of Public Works.
12	"Graffiti: Part Four: Public Spaces vs. Private Space"	May 4, 2010
Graffiti artists ESPO, KR, Craig R. Stecyk, Barry McGee, Amaze, Earsnot, Sace and Shepard Fairey discuss public spaces versus private space.
