= Alex Lilly =

American singer-songwriter

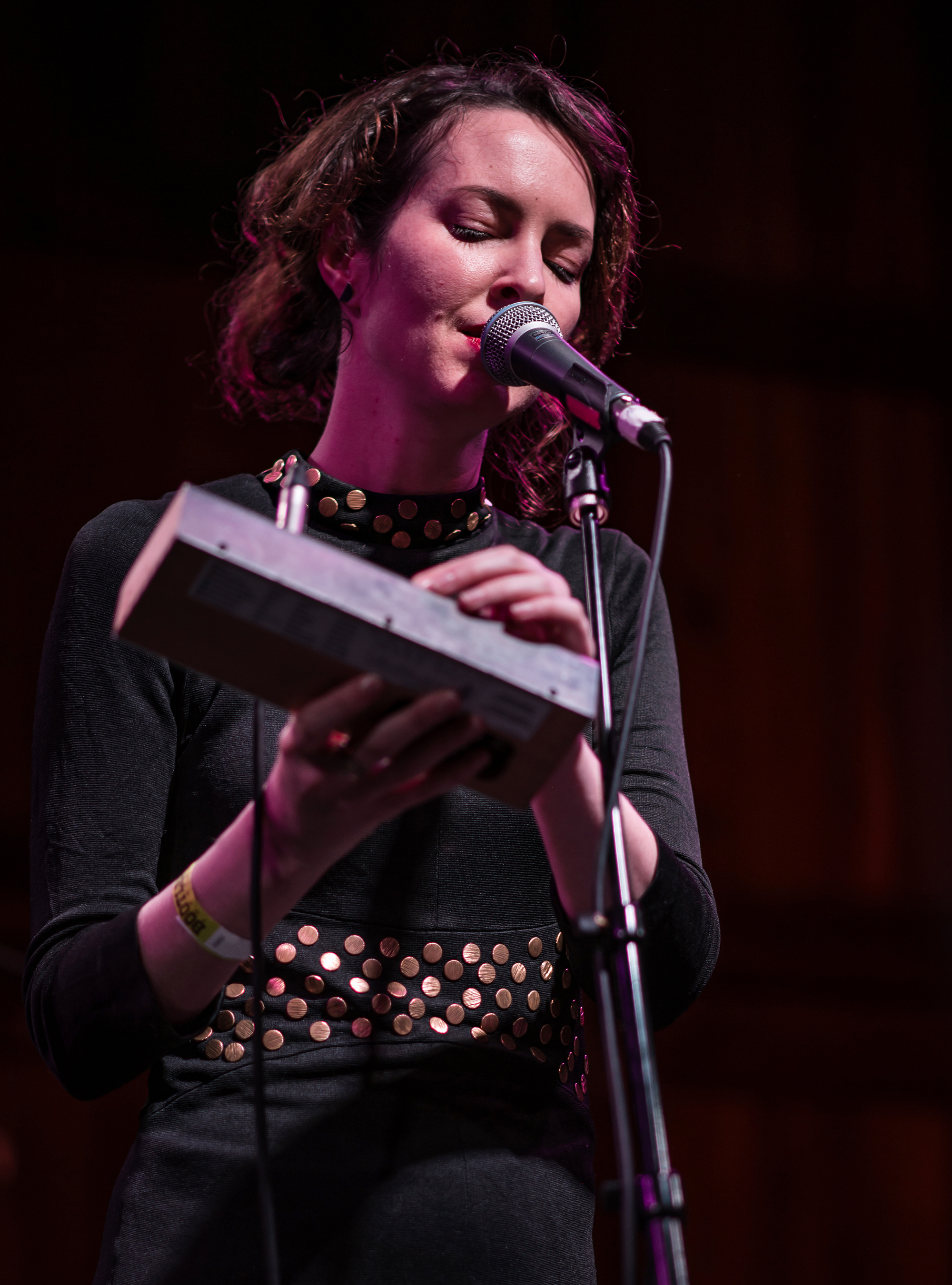
- Lilly performing in 2017

Background information
- Born: Alexandra West Lilly
- Origin: Los Angeles, California
- Genres: Indie pop
- Instruments: Vocals; guitar; piano
- Labels: Release Me Records, Vanguard, Social Science Recordings

Alexandra West Lilly is an American singer-songwriter. She has played in the touring bands for Beck, Lorde, Ry Cooder, and The Bird and the Bee. Since 2010 she has played in The Living Sisters, a supergroup featuring The Bird and the Bee's Inara George, Lavender Diamond's Becky Stark, and singer/songwriter Eleni Mandell.

In 2019 Lilly released her solo debut album 2% Milk on Inara George's label Release Me Records. Produced with Jacob Bercovici of The Voidz and Andy Bauer of Twin Shadow, the album received a glowing review from Jon Pareles at The New York Times, "Lilly's songs are full of musicianly gamesmanship... Lilly delivers structural and emotional complexity with deceptive nonchalance."

On July 31, 2020, she released a song bundle on Release Me called Love in Three Colors. She has also announced an EP with Bobby Gruska of The Belle Brigade and an upcoming stage musical.

== Discography ==
=== As Obi Best ===
- 2008: Capades
- 2011: Sentimental Education

=== As Touché ===
- 2013: It's Fate

=== As Alex Lilly ===
- 2016: Paranoid Times - EP
- 2019: 2% Milk
- 2020: Love in Three Colors - EP
- 2022: Repetition is a Sin

=== With The Living Sisters ===
- 2010: Love To Live
- 2013: Run for Cover
- 2014: Harmony is Real: Songs for a Happy Holiday
