= Don't Move Here =

- Also known as: Don't Move Here: Inside Portland's Music Scene
- Genre: Documentary
- Created by: Aaron Rose
- Directed by: Aaron Rose (season 1); Shayla Hason (season 2)
- Presented by: Shayla Hason
- Country of origin: United States
- Original language: English
- No. of seasons: 2
- No. of episodes: 15

Production
- Executive producers: Aaron Rose, Bill Davenport, Janice Grube
- Production location: Portland, Oregon
- Running time: 5 – 12 minutes
- Production company: Wieden+Kennedy Entertainment

Original release
- Network: Wieden+Kennedy Entertainment
- Release: December 2009 – 2011

Don't Move Here: Inside Portland's Music Scene is an American documentary series about Portland, Oregon's music scene, that relatively recently has become a hot spot for indie bands. The series was created by director and curator Aaron Rose and produced by Wieden+Kennedy Entertainment.

The series features interviews with Portland-based artists, musicians and record label producers, as well as concert footage taken at various underground and less known music venues. Bands, labels and studios profiled so far include Yacht, Grouper, Honey Owens, Jackie-O Motherfucker Mississippi Studios, Rev. Shines, Libretto, Marriage Records, Rob Walmart, States Rights Records, Type Foundry, Jackpot Studios, Explode Into Colors, White Fang, Mississippi Records and Portland Mayor Sam Adams.

In 2010 the series's first season was nominated for the 14th Annual Webby Awards in the music category.

== Episode Synopsis ==
=== Season 1 ===
No. in season	Title	Original release date
1	"Explode Into Colors"	December 1, 2009
The first episode features an interview with Steve Schroeder of States Rights Records, a Portland independent label—followed by a stop at the all-ages music venue, Artistery, featuring performances by White Fang and Explode Into Colors.
2	"The Black Gumdrop, Audio Dregs and Atole"	December 8, 2009
Episode two begins with a visit to the shared studio of Mike King and Guy Burwell, two of Portland's most well known music poster artists where they discuss their work and some of the bands they have created visuals for. Then we travel to the office of Audio Dregs, a small independent label focusing on electronic music. The episode ends with a live performance by Audio Dregs recording artist, Atole.
3	"Honey Owens and Grouper"	December 22, 2009
Episode 3 visits two Portland based experimental musicians, Honey Owens of Valet and Grouper (Liz Harris). They talk about the creative process, getting lost in music and their connection through the vintage clothing/record store Rad Summer.
4	"Rev. Shines, Libretto, Yacht and Mayor Sam Adams"	January 12, 2010
Episode 4 starts off with a chat between Rev. Shines of Lifesavas and Libretto about Portland’s unique approach to hip-hop, City Hall for an interview with Portland Mayor Sam Adams about the free PDX Pop Now! concerts. Electropop darlings Yacht play live and talk about the influence of Marfa, Texas, on their recent album, See Mystery Lights.
5	"Marriage Records and Rob Walmart"	January 26, 2010
Episode 5 highlights the community of artists that surround the Portland-based music label Marriage Records. The show interviewed label owners Curtis Knapp and Adam Forkner about the history and family ethics behind its operation, learned about Forkner's solo act, White Rainbow, and taped a guerrilla street performance from the collective group Rob Walmart.
6	"Eggy Records and UHU Tapes"	February 9, 2010
Episode 6 looks at the return in popularity of cassette tapes with a focus on two of Portland’s budding cassette tape labels, Eggy and UHU. The episode interviewed Eggy Records' Raf Spielman at Downtown Portland's Half & Half, UHU Tapes' Yoni Kifle, and ended with a performance from Eternal Tapestry.
7	"Mississippi Avenue"	February 23, 2010
Episode 7 explores the rapidly changing Mississippi Avenue neighborhood of North Portland and highlights Mississippi Records and Repair, Mississippi Studios and Portland treasure Paul Knauls. Jackie-O Motherfucker performs.

=== Season 2 ===
No. in season	Title	Original release date
1	"Tucker Martine and Rachel Blumberg Colors"	February 2011
2	"Roller Sound and Nurses"	2011
3	"Lewi Longmire and You Who"	2011
4	"Cull and Red Fang"	2011
5	"Isaac Brock and Glacial Pace"	2011
6	"Lo Dubs and Studios"	2011
7	"Holocene and Pete Swanson"	2011
8	"Trevor Solomon and MFNW"	2011

== See also ==
- Tom McCall, a former Oregon governor who popularized the notion of "don't move here" in 1971.
