= Califunya =

American web variety show

- Genre: Variety show
- Created by: Becky Stark
- Directed by: Becky Stark
- Starring: Becky Stark
- Country of origin: United States
- Original language: English
- No. of seasons: 1
- No. of episodes: 6

Production
- Executive producers: Aaron Rose, Janice Grube, Bill Davenport
- Production location: Portland, Oregon
- Running time: 1 – 5 minutes
- Production company: Sanguine Film

Original release
- Network: Wieden+Kennedy Entertainment
- Release: December 2009 – March 2010

Califunya! is an American web variety show directed and written by Los Angeles, California based artist and singer-songwriter Becky Stark. The show is an episodic ensemble comedy featuring a revolving cast of guest stars including Miranda July, Peter Glantz, Tunde Adebimpe, Ron Regé, Jr., Mia Doi Todd, Ariana Delawari, Josh Fadem, and Brandon Ratcliff.

The show was originally produced as a stage show in Los Angeles in 2006, which was followed by a preliminary film shoot in New York City and Los Angeles the same year. A second film shoot was produced in Summer 2009 in Portland, Oregon. Season one entered final post-production in fall 2009.

== Format ==
Like any variety show, Califunya! features musical performances by artists such as The LA Ladies Choir and Colin Meloy of The Decemberists, comedy skits and guest appearances by visual artists like Jim Drain, who also served as the show's art director. The tone of the show was described as "parodying a high school play that is parodying a kids' show from the '60s as performed by grownups—with all the expected exclamation points muted."

It was produced and released in 2009/2010 by Wieden+Kennedy Entertainment.

== Episode list ==
No.	Title	Featured artist	Original release date
1	Sailing Through Space on a Beautiful Planet!	Mia Doi Todd, Ariana Delawari	December 15, 2009
2	"Bluebird" ♫	Ariana Delawari, Mia Doi Todd, Colin Meloy	January 5, 2010
3	The Curtain	Aaron Rose	January 19, 2010
4	The Key to My Happiness!	Ariana Delawari	February 2, 2010
5	Musical Guest ♫ Colin Meloy	Colin Meloy	February 16, 2010
6	Tea Party ♥	Aaron Rose	March 2, 2010
