= Make Something!! =

Make Something!! is an international series of creative workshops for teens founded by Aaron Rose and Stefani Relles. Since its inception in 2008, more than 2,000 high school students have taken part in Make Something!! workshops held in New York City, Los Angeles, San Francisco, Miami, Portland and Tokyo. Working with public school art programs and youth mentoring organizations, Make Something!! brings together professional artists and aspiring teenagers with the intention of teaching hands-on practical creative skills.

Curricula incorporate elements of art, design, music, fashion and film and past teachers include Mike Mills, Todd James, Kaws, Jose Parla, Ed Templeton, Geoff Mcfedtridge, Cheryl Dunn, Money Mark, and Scott Campbell.

Workshop series have been supported by and held in collaboration with Nike, RVCA, Manifest Equality, the Laforet Museum in Tokyo, and the NADA Art Fair in Miami.
