= Leo Romero =

American skateboarder (born 1986)

- Born: Leo Romero; November 28, 1986 (age 39); Fontana, California, US
- Occupation: Professional skateboarder

Leo Romero (born November 28, 1986) is a professional skateboarder whose early skateboarding influences included Heath Kirchart, Jamie Thomas and Andrew Reynolds.

== Early life ==
Romero was born in Fontana, California, United States and is the son of Mexican immigrant parents. Romero first started skating around 1997 with his friendship crew "The Death Junkies". Romero revealed in a 2009 interview that he "was ditching school and skating with friends" during his adolescence, while in a 2010 interview he explained that when he was growing up he knew what he wanted and did not let other people bother him. Leo has four siblings. Nicolas, Dario, Ish, and Selena.

== Career ==
=== Professional skateboarding ===
Romero has credited his sponsor the Pharmacy skateboard shop ("The craziest family I've ever had ...") with facilitating his departure from his hometown for the purpose of commencing a skateboarding career. Conversely, Romero's father has believed that "he [Romero's father]’s the reason why I made it so far"—that "he’s the one who gave me all the inspiration behind my career" but Romero believes that his father is mistaken. Romero has ridden the same skateboard deck shape for nearly a decade and the original board shape was provided by the Pharmacy shop.

Romero appeared in the Foundation videos Madness & Mayhem (2002) and That's Life (2004).

As an Emerica team rider, Romero lived at the "Emerica Mansion II" with professional skateboarders Heath Kirchart, Kevin "Spanky" Long, and Bryan Herman. In May 2013, the Romero signature shoe model "The Troubadour" was released, and Romero explained that the shoe design was based on footwear that could be for both skateboarding and fashion.

Romero's first board sponsor was Foundation Skateboards, which produced the infamous Everybody Loves Leo deck.

Romero left Foundation to became a professional team rider for Baker Skateboards, a company that was founded and is owned by one of his childhood skateboarding influences Reynolds—in a 2010 interview Romero explained that his motivation for joining the team was based on his perception that Baker was "cool". Romero appeared in the Baker video production Baker Has A Deathwish (2008) that is a collaboration with "sister" brand Deathwish (as of May 2013, both companies are distributed by Bakerboys Distribution).

In 2009 Romero left Baker to join the Toy Machine company and explained in a 2010 Thrasher magazine interview that "I just don’t think I fit in with that crowd. It’s not really my bag." Romero revealed to Mike Sinclair, a senior employee of Tum Yeto (distribution company for both Foundation and Toy Machine), that Toy Machine is "100% skateboarding". Toy Machine and Emerica have collaborated on a Romero signature shoe line with Toy Machine founder/owner Ed Templeton, who is also sponsored by Emerica.

Together with his friend Griffin Collins, Romero launched the skateboard griptape company Bro Style in 2012. While primarily a griptape company, the brand also produces soft goods such as caps, socks, and shirts. Bro Style has released video advertisements on the Internet that feature sponsored riders such as Matt Bennett, Dakota Servold, and Daniel Lutheran.

==== Sponsors ====
- Emerica
- Toy Machine
- Pharmacy
- Eswic
- Independent Truck Company
- Pig Wheels
- Neff
- Bro Style
- Bronson Speed Co. Bearings

=== Music ===
With his band Travesura, Romero released his first recording on the Scion AV label on March 1, 2014 at an event in Los Angeles, U.S. The recording is a self-titled EP and a music video for the song "Tenor" was also released.

== Personal life ==
Romero resides in California, U.S. in a "mock Spanish castle" property and owns a Harley-Davidson motorcycle that he has ridden as part of the Emerica skateboarding tour "Wild Ride". Romero explained his life outside of skateboarding in a 2009 interview: "I’m a pretty simple guy. Not too much shit bothers me but I hate going to overcrowded bars and they’re overcharging you for beer. I hate that. The same things as everybody else I think: Playing guitar, listening to music, barbecuing on a summer day, finishing up some cold ones, fucking girls." Leo attended the University of Massachusetts graduating in 2012 with a degree in Geology.

== Awards ==
Romero won Thrasher Magazine's annual "Skater of the Year" award in 2010. As part of the award ceremony, Romero performed karaoke for the audience.

== Videography ==
- Toy Machine: Programming Injection (2019)
- Emerica: Made (2013)
- Thrasher: King Of The Road 2012 (2013)
- Toy Machine: The Subhumans (2011)
- Toy Machine: Brainwash. (2010)
- Emerica: Stay Gold (2010)
- RVCA: Dick Moves (2010)
- RVCA: Promo (2009)
- Transworld: Skate & Create (2008)
- Baker: Baker has a Deathwish (2008)
- Emerica: Wild Ride 2007 (2007)
- Streets: LA (2007)
- 411VM: Volume 3, Issue 4 (April 2006) – shared part with Tommy Gurrola
- Foundation: Gareth Stehr's Go-Go Toe Jam (2006)
- Thrasher: King Of The Road 2006 (2006)
- Transworld: First Love (2005)
- Foundation: European Tour (2005)
- 411VM: Volume 13, Issue 4 (2005)
- V7: Teenage Tour (2004)
- Foundation: That's Life (2004)
- Emerica: Kids In Emerica (2004)
- Emerica: This is Skateboarding (2003)
- Pharmacy: Chilly (2003)
- Digital: Fajsha (2003)
- Foundation: Madness & Mayhem (2002)
