= Jahmal Williams =

American skateboarder

Jahmal Williams is a regular-footed professional skateboarder, skate company owner, and artist from Boston, Massachusetts.

== Early life and education ==
Williams was raised by his mother in Boston, Massachusetts with four other siblings. As a young kid in the early-to-mid 1980s, Williams was into breakdancing and graffiti writing. In an effort to stay out of trouble, Williams got into freestyle BMX biking. He brought his bike to the local skatepark and had it stolen. This lead Williams to buy a skateboard in the summer of 1988. His mother bought him a Thrasher magazine issue with Tony Alva on the cover, further encouraging his interest in skating.

In 1998, Williams received a scholarship to attend the School of the Museum of Fine Arts in Boston. There he studied drawing, sculpture, and painting for four years.

== Skateboarding ==
Williams first sponsor was Beacon Hill Skateshop. T.V. skateboards came to Whitman, Massachusetts on a tour. Williams befriended the team and ended up going on tour with them. T.V. team was Mike Vallely, Ed Templeton, Steve Berra, Ethan Fowler, Jerry Fowler, and Williams. Williams went pro for T.V.

After T.V. folded Williams joined Ed Templeton's new company, Toy Machine. After riding for Toy Machine for a number of years, Mike Vallely connected Williams to Powell. Williams rode for Powell for a number of years until he parted ways with the company.

Skate Video Parts & Appearances	Year
The Fat Juicy Video	1991
3D Innovations	1991
Toy Machine Live!	1994
Eastern Exposure	1996
adidas Commercial	1998
INFMS	2000
DNA Continuum	2002
Static 3	2007
Hopps Commercial 1	2009
MIA Skate Shop Welcome to MIA	2010
Ride Channel Skate New York with Hopps	2012
Orchard Stone Soup	2014
Static 4	2014
Hopps The “Saturday” Project	2016
Welcome to Dial Tone MFG	2018
The Converse CONS X Hopps Collection	2018

=== Hopps Skateboards ===
In 2007, Williams founded Hopps Skateboards.
