= Run for Cover (The Living Sisters album) =

Studio album by The Living Sisters
- Released: January 8, 2013
- Genre: Rock
- Length: 22:31
- Label: Vanguard

The Living Sisters chronology
Love to Live (2010)	Run for Cover (2013)

Professional ratings
Aggregate scores
Source	Rating
Metacritic	69/100
Review scores
Source	Rating
Allmusic	3.5/5 stars
PopMatters	6/10

Run for Cover is the second studio album by American female folk group The Living Sisters. It was released in January 2013 under Vanguard Records.

== Track list ==
No.	Title	Writer(s)	Length
1.	"Make Love to Me"	Walter Melrose	2:51
2.	"Can You Get To That"	George Clinton and Ernie Harris	3:27
3.	"Que Sera, Sera (Whatever Will Be, Will Be)"	Jay Livingston and Ray Evans	5:46
4.	"A Poor Man's Roses (Or a Rich Man's Gold)"	Bob Hilliard and Milton De Lugg	3:01
5.	"Jolene"	Dolly Parton	2:53
6.	"Sweet Dreams"	Don Gibson	4:33

== Personnel ==
Group members

- Inara George - vocals
- Alex Lilly - vocals, piano
- Eleni Mandell - vocals, guitar
- Becky Stark - vocals

Additional personnel

- Jeremy Drake - guitar
- Ryan Feves - bass
- Don Heffington - drums
- Greg Leisz - pedal steel guitar
- Tim Young - guitar
