= Incorruptible Heart =

Studio album by Lavender Diamond
- Released: September 2012
- Genre: Indie rock
- Label: Paracadute
- Producer: Damian Kulash

Lavender Diamond chronology
Imagine Our Love (2007)	Incorruptible Heart (2012)	Now Is the Time (2021)

Professional ratings
Review scores
Source	Rating
AllMusic	4/5 stars
Los Angeles Times	3.5/4 stars

Incorruptible Heart is the second full-length album by the Los Angeles-based band Lavender Diamond, released in September 2012 as a vinyl LP, compact disc and digital download. It received generally favorable critical reviews.

== Background ==
The album was produced by Damian Kulash of the band OK Go, who also sang backing vocals on one song. The vocalist Becky Stark gave her interpretation of the word "corruptible" as being made up of the French cœur ("heart") and rupture, in which case "Incorruptible Heart" would yield "non-heartbreak-able heart". (Fanciful as this is, the correct etymology has no relation to cœur.)

== Release ==
250 copies of the LP were pressed on lavender vinyl, with 50 copies packaged in a tote bag with an original drawing by the band's drummer and artist Ron Regé Jr.

== Reception ==
Metacritic assigned the album a "generally favorable" aggregate score of 76%, based on eight reviews. Giving the album three-and-a-half stars, The LA Times marvelled at Stark's ability to make an album in the thick of her other projects, remarking that when "results sparkle this brilliantly, the multi-tasking seems exceedingly worth it." Pitchfork gave the album a 7 out 10, and said that Stark "is still preoccupied with love, but makes use of a brighter, sexier, spacier palette to explore a favored theme." All Music gave the album 8 out of 10, saying that the band's "uniquely direct sound have been brought into higher definition," but brought "with it a refined sophistication absent on earlier work."

== Video ==
The band released a video for the album's lead track, "Everybody's Heart's Breaking Now", on 25 September 2012. Directed by Maximilla Lukacs, it has multiple images of the singer Becky Stark falling and spinning through space.

== Track listing ==
1. "Everybody's Heart's Breaking Now"
2. "Dragonfly"
3. "I Don't Recall"
4. "Just Passing By"
5. "Teach Me How To Waken"
6. "Come Home"
7. "Forgive"
8. "Light My Way"
9. "Oh My Beautiful World"
10. "There's A Perfect Love For Me"
11. "Everybody's Song"
12. "All The Stars"

== Album credits ==
- Becky Stark: vocals, guitar, tap dancing
- Steve Gregoropolous: piano, synthesizer
- Ron Regé, Jr.: drums, artwork
- Jeff Rosenberg: guitar, bass guitar
- M. Ward: additional guitar
- The Calder Quartet: strings
- Damian Kulash: production, additional vocals
- Dave Fridmann: mixing
