= Representing NYC =

Representing NYC is a nonprofit artist management firm based in New York City. Representing NYC acts as a bridge between artists working in the context of social services programming and professional arts organizations and artists by fostering collaborative projects. Past Representing NYC projects have included a series of hip-hop albums, a silk screened T-shirt line, and three radio programs. Its network has included the Social Registry, True Panther Sounds, and Terrible Records, and a number of artists and educators.

== Mission ==
Representing NYC seeks to create opportunities for musicians and artists working in undercapitalized settings so their work can reach a broader public than it would otherwise. Representing NYC also promotes life skills amongst its participants, such as principles of leadership, professional instinct, and financial literacy.

While its primary goal is to provide a service to underrepresented artists, Representing NYC also creates a meaningful way for artists moving into the rapidly changing neighborhoods of New York City to engage with the youth and the communities that surround them.

== History ==
Representing NYC was founded in the spring of 2007 by Sam Hillmer. Hillmer Initially pitched the idea of RNYC as a project to be executed at Brownsville, Brooklyn middle school PS 284: a professionally manufactured CD featuring the hip-hop music of young students.

The project began in the fall of 2007 and eventually became the Fly Girlz record "Da Bratz From Da 'Ville", released on True Panther Sounds and Sockets CDs in April 2008 and featuring production from Nathan Corbin a.k.a. Zebrablood (Excepter). During the production of the record, the home base of Representing NYC was moved to intermediate school IS 291, where Hillmer became the director of teen programming. The Fly Girlz moved their work there as well and finished the project with a record release show at the New Museum, a documentary by Hanly Banks of The FADER, and performances with artists including Mr. Lif, Prefuse 73, and Jorge "Fabel" Pabon of the Rock Steady Crew. The Fly Girlz' "Born To Be Fly" was a featured track on Pitchfork and iTunes. In the winter of 2010 the entire Fly Girlz record was licensed by high fashion moguls Proenza Schouler for use during fashion week.

During the campaign surrounding the Fly Girlz record, Representing NYC fostered the development of the teen rap radical phenomena Nine 11 Thesaurus. Their first record Ground Zero Generals was released by seminal New York underground record label The Social Registry in 2011 and features production by Tim Dewitt (Gang Gang Dance) and Matt Mehlan (Skeletons). Nine 11 Thesaurus, originally Nine 11 GZG, began as a loose collection of MCs meeting at The Beacon Center for Arts and Leadership's Teen Action Program before congealing into an 8-person rap team. Nine 11 Thesaurus also produced the radio program Real Talk on Radio23 and built a community garden in East Bushwick out of a vacant lot.

In 2013, Representing NYC began working with hip-hop group Zulu P and moved its base of operations to Queens outsider music venue Trans-Pecos. They began rapping together in 2010 through AHRC New York City, a partner of NYSARC, the largest organization serving people with developmental disabilities. Hillmer began working with the group after meeting them at Carnegie Hall, and they have since performed at venues such as the Queens Museum, Ace Hotel, and The Chris Gethard Show. Zulu P's In My Life Mixtape was released on Terrible Records in 2014 with collaborators such as Blood Orange and Twin Shadow. While preparing for the release of their next record, they have been featured in news outlets such as CNN, Elite Daily, and the Huffington Post. Zulu P currently hosts D-Lo Radio, a weekly program on 8Ball Radio with guest collaborators such as Miho Hatori and Deem Spencer.

In the summer of 2017, Representing NYC moved its base of operations again to Queens music venue 1090.

== Other work ==
While the production of Representing NYC's records has dominated the organization's work, Representing NYC also supports artists working in other mediums besides music. Artists have included United Systems Fashion Collective, Real Talk, and Brooklyn We Go Hard internet radio programs.
