= Beautiful Losers (film) =

- Release Poster
- Starring: Thomas Campbell; Cheryl Dunn; Shepard Fairey; Jo Jackson; Chris Johanson; Margaret Kilgallen; Harmony Korine; Geoff McFetridge; Barry McGee; Mike Mills; Stephen Powers II; Claire E. Rojas; Aaron Rose; Deanna Templeton; Ed Templeton
- Cinematography: Tobin Yelland
- Edited by: Lenny Mesina
- Music by: Money Mark
- Release date: March 1, 2008 (SXSW)
- Running time: 89 minutes
- Country: United States
- Language: English

Beautiful Losers is a 2008 documentary filmed by director Aaron Rose and co-directed by Joshua Leonard. It was produced by Sidetrack Films in association with BlackLake Productions, and stars several artists including Harmony Korine (writer of independent cult films Kids (1995) and Gummo (1997), the latter directed by Korine himself) and former graffiti artist Steve "ESPO" Powers.

It premiered at South by Southwest on March 9, 2008 and later in general release on August 8, 2008 at the IFC Center in New York City.

== Subject matter ==
The film focuses on the careers and work of a collective group of artists who since the 1990s began a movement in the art world using D.I.Y. aesthetics from skateboarding, graffiti and underground music such as punk rock and hip-hop. The artists discussed and interviewed in the film include Thomas Campbell, Cheryl Dunn, Shepard Fairey, Harmony Korine, Geoff McFetridge, Clare Rojas, Barry McGee, Margaret Kilgallen, Mike Mills, Steve "Espo" Powers, Ed Templeton, Deanna Templeton, and Mark Gonzales.

A series of interviews with these artists explains their reasoning behind their "do-it-yourself" style of street art. As some of these artists discuss their growth in popular artistic culture they explain how becoming renowned and admired in the art world was something that never occurred to them from their various roots in street culture, or simply creating art for themselves. As many of the artists began to be recognizable and sought after they discuss their series of commercial success: creating advertisements for popular products, designing products themselves, working in film and being hired to paint and create artwork in well known locations. The personal feelings and convictions of some of the artists and how creating work for corporations compares to their beginnings in street culture is also discussed. The film portrays the artists as outside the realm of contemporary art.

Cover of Beautiful Losers art book

== Art book ==
The film was preceded by a published art collection titled Beautiful Losers.(ISBN 1933045302) The book was co-published by Iconoclast Editions and Distributed Art Publishers, and edited by co-curators Christian Strike and Aaron Rose, who directed the film.

== Traveling museum exhibition ==
The publication of the book was to complement and commemorate the traveling museum exhibition, which itself was one of the settings and subjects for the film. The exhibit is a large scale group exhibition featuring the artists from the film as well as others, and which continues to tour around the world. Opening in Cincinnati, Ohio at the Contemporary Arts Center in March 2004, the exhibition was in Europe through 2009. The exhibition was conceived and produced by Iconoclast, where founders Christian Strike and Aaron Rose also acted as co-curators of the exhibition, and as the editors and publishers of the book.
