= Imagine Our Love =

Studio album by Lavender Diamond
- Released: May 2007
- Genre: Folk

Lavender Diamond chronology
The Cavalry of Light	Imagine Our Love	Incorruptible Heart

Professional ratings
Review scores
Source	Rating
AllMusic	4/5 stars
The A.V. Club	B
Pitchfork Media	6.0/10

Imagine Our Love is a studio album by the Los Angeles–based folk band Lavender Diamond. It was released in May 2007 by Matador Records.

== Track listing ==
1. "Oh No" – 3:47
2. "Garden Rose" – 5:04
3. "Open Your Heart" – 3:11
4. "Side of the Lord" – 2:48
5. "I'll Never Lie Again" – 3:29
6. "Dance Until It's Tomorrow" – 6:39
7. "Like an Arrow" – 4:22
8. "My Shadow Is a Monday" – 3:24
9. "Bring Me a Song" – 4:44
10. "Here Comes One" – 2:57
11. "Find a Way" – 4:53
12. "When You Wake for Certain" – 5:36

=== Bonus tracks ===
1. "Oh No" (iTunes bonus track, performed by Colin Meloy) – 3:20
