= Jamel Shabazz =

American photographer

- Born: 1960 (age 65–66); New York City, U.S.
- Occupation: Photographer
- Years active: 1980s–present
- Known for: Back in the Days

Jamel Shabazz (born 1960) is an African American fashion, fine-art, documentary, and street style photographer. His work has been published in books, shown in exhibitions, and used in editorial magazine works. He was born in Brooklyn, New York City.

Shabazz centers his work on minority people and areas of America. He was a pioneer in creating awareness of the livelihoods of African-American and other minorities in the New York City area. Shabazz is considered a master at using what is at his disposal to create realistic scenes of being a part of the Black community in that time and place. His works express the joys that come with growing up in the city. Jamel paints the minority and poor class that lives there in a familiar and playful light that goes against negative stereotypes of the time.

One of his most famous works is the photograph "A Time of Innocence", taken in 1981 in Brooklyn, New York. This photograph depicts a group of young African American children playing and riding in a shopping cart in the midst of a chaotic street.

== Career ==
His book Back in the Days (2002) collects Shabazz's street style photographs made in New York City between 1980 and 1989, which document its emerging hip hop culture. The Last Sunday in June (2003) collects ten years of photographs of gay pride events in New York City. Sights in the City: New York Street Photographs (2017) contains work from four decades of photographing people in the city. City Metro (2020) contains photographs made between 1980 and 2018 of people on the New York City Subway.

Shabazz's photographs have appeared in the 2007 documentary film Planet B-Boy, the 2008 exhibition Street Art Street Life: From the 1950s to Now in the Bronx Museum of the Arts, and as the album cover art for the 2011 hip hop album Undun by The Roots. Shabazz appeared in Cheryl Dunn's 2010 documentary Everybody Street, which is "about photographers who have used New York City street life as a major subject in their work."

In an interview with Nation19 magazine, Jamel said he uses both analog film and digital photography.

In 2016, a fictionalized version of Shabazz was portrayed by Cedric Benjamin in a flashback in the second episode of Luke Cage.

In 2022, the Bronx Museum of the Arts presented Jamel Shabazz: Eyes on the Street, the first museum survey of his work, featuring over 150 photograph made between 1980 and 2020. The exhibition was curated by Antonio Sergio Bessa and included works from the museum's collection alongside images from Shabazz's personal archive.

Shabazz's work was included in the 2025 exhibition Photography and the Black Arts Movement, 1955–1985 at the National Gallery of Art.

== Publications ==
- Back in the Days. Brooklyn: powerHouse, 2002. ISBN 978-1576871065.
- The Last Sunday in June. Brooklyn: powerHouse, 2003. ISBN 978-1576871720.
- A Time Before Crack. Brooklyn: powerHouse, 2005. ISBN 978-1576872130.
- Seconds of My Life. Brooklyn: powerHouse, 2007. ISBN 978-1576873601.
- Sights in the City: New York Street Photographs. Damiani, 2017. ISBN 978-8862085229.
- Back in the Days: Remix. Brooklyn: powerHouse, 2017. ISBN 978-1576875674.
- City Metro. Bene Taschen, 2020.

== Awards ==
- Rush Philanthropic Arts Foundation Award (2010)
- The Gordon Parks Foundation Award for Documentary Photography (2018)
- Gordon Parks Foundation/Steidl Book Prize (2022)
- Lucie Award for Documentary (2023)
