= Toy Machine =

Skateboarding company

Toy Machine logo

Toy Machine is a skateboarding company, housed under the Tum Yeto distribution company, started by Ed Templeton in 1993.

== History ==
Prior to inception, Templeton was unable to decide on either "Toy Skateboards" or "Machine Skateboards" for a company name—friend and fellow professional skateboarder Ethan Fowler suggested a combination of the two propositions.

Some of the skateboarders who joined the company during its early period were Brian Anderson, Elissa Steamer, and Brad Staba; however, all three quit the company at the same time. Austin Stephens then joined the team, followed by Caswell Berry, Diego Bucchieri, and Josh Harmony.

Stephens, the longest-serving team member aside from Templeton, retired from professional skateboarding in December 2013. The company released a tribute skateboard deck to commemorate Stephens's career and Templeton officially stated 2010.

I recall Austin coming to me at the Toy Machine Halloween demo a few years back saying that he didn’t think he could do it anymore. And I said, “Do what?” and he said, “Skateboard. My ankle doesn’t work anymore.” It was a heavy realization, one a skateboarder hates to actually come to grips with. Every skateboarder thrashes their ankles over time, and for Austin, it was just one tear, tweak, twist too many and after loads of procedures and healing time it seemed to be worse than when he started.

I respect a man who is willing to see things as they are and make an honest choice. So it was with great sadness that we retired Austin Stephens, the rider who was on Toy Machine the longest aside from me.

== Team ==
- Ed Templeton
- Geoff Rowley
- Leo Romero
- Axel Cruysbergs
- C. J. Collins
- Jeremy Leabras
- Myles Willard
- Braden Hoban
- Cordano Russell
- Raphae Udea
- Georgia Martin
- Shiloh Catori

== Filmography ==
- Live! was released in 1994. Featured riders include Charlie Coatney, Templeton, Ethan Fowler, Jahmal Williams, Jerry Fowler, Joe Nemeth, Panama Dan, Pete Lehman, and Thomas Campbell.
- Heavy Metal was released in 1995. Featured riders include Templeton, Jamie Thomas, Josh Kalis, Panama Dan, and Satva Leung.
- Welcome to Hell was released in 1996. Notable featured riders include Elissa Steamer, Templeton, Brian Anderson, Donny Barley, Jason Acuña(Wee Man), Mike Maldonado, and Jamie Thomas. Chad Muska's part was edited out right before the video's premiere but was included as a hidden extra on the DVD release. It included a segment from Zero Skateboards then called zero clothing.
- Jump Off A Building was released in 1998. The video featured some of the riders that were in Welcome to Hell, but also included new skateboarders, like Bam Margera and Kerry Getz. Jamie Thomas, Satva Leung & Donny Barley exited the team before this video.
- Good and Evil, Toy Machine's fifth video, premiered October 22, 2004, at the House of Blues in Los Angeles, California, US. Riders featured are Templeton, Diego Bucchieri, Austin Stephens, and Marks, with debut parts from Josh Harmony, Johnny Layton, and Matt Bennett. Coming after a few years of exiting riders and a stint where the only people on the team were Templeton and Stephens, Good & Evil came out and won Transworld Skateboarding Magazine's "Video of the Year."
- Suffer The Joy premiered November 9, 2006 at The Art Theater in Long Beach, California, US. In addition to the riders from Good & Evil, the video included a debut part from Nick Trapasso.
- Brainwash premiered on October 26, 2010, at The Gaslamp in Long Beach, California, US. The promotional video includes all past riders from Suffer The Joy, as well as Leo Romero, Daniel Lutheran, Jordan Taylor, and Collin Provost. The video was released on iTunes and DVD on November 8, 2010.
- Tour videos: Sucking the Life (2003), Bezerker (2003), Lurk Fest (2008), and The Subhumans (2010).
- Programming Injection was released in 2019.

== See also ==
- List of skateboarding brands
