= Twelve Days of OK Go =

Compilation album by OK Go
- Released: December 31, 2012
- Genre: Alternative rock; pop rock
- Length: 37:31
- Label: Paracadute

OK Go chronology
Of the Blue Colour of the Sky (2010)	Twelve Days of OK Go (2012)	Hungry Ghosts (2014)

Twelve Days of OK Go is a compilation album by American rock band OK Go. It was released on December 31, 2012. OK Go started releasing the songs on December 10, with one song released each weekday. The last song, a cover of "Any Time at All", was released on Christmas. A bonus track, a cover of "This Will Be Our Year," was released on New Year's Eve.

== Track listing ==
1. "Last Leaf" (Mahogany Sessions) – 2:13
2. "Dynamite" (A La Playa Release) – 2:48
3. "Oh Lately It's So Quiet" (Acoustic) – 3:18
4. "Here It Goes Again" (UK Surf Mix) – 4:36
5. "Wave of Mutilation" (Pixies Cover) – 3:14
6. "Down For the Count" (UK B-Side) – 3:01
7. "Bye Bye Baby" (Demo) – 2:02
8. "Antmusic" (Adam & The Ants Cover) – 2:51
9. "Letterbox" (They Might Be Giants Cover) – 2:07
10. "Father Christmas" (Kinks Cover) – 4:13
11. "Have Yourself A Merry Little Christmas" (Cover) – 2:49
12. "Any Time At All" (The Beatles Cover) – 2:11
13. "This Will Be Our Year" (The Zombies Cover) – 2:08
