= NRW Forum =

Museum in Düsseldorf, North Rhine-Westphalia, Germany

Coordinates: 51°14′00″N 6°46′19″E

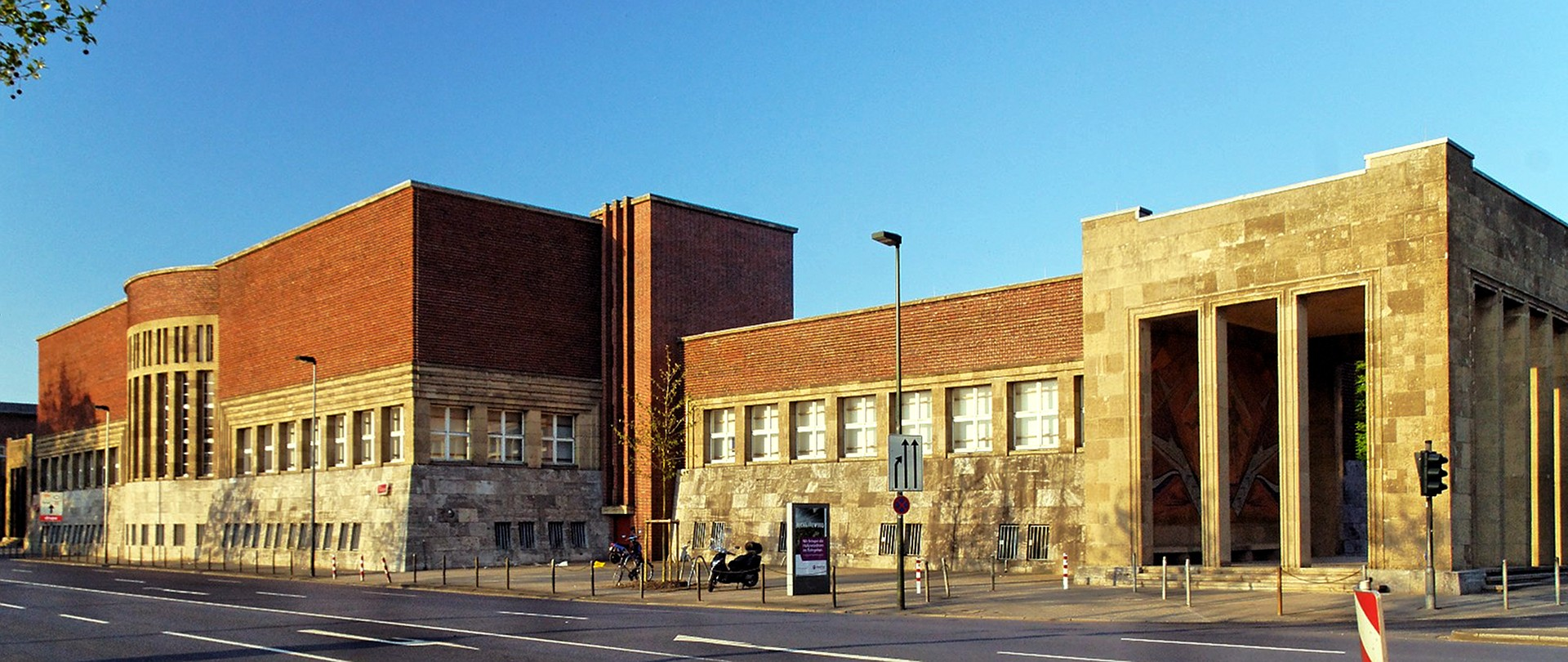
NRW Forum

NRW Forum, Düsseldorf

The NRW Forum Wirtschaft und Kultur (Forum NRW), formerly the Museum für Industrie und Wirtschaft, is a museum in Düsseldorf, the state capital of North Rhine-Westphalia, dealing with the development and the economy of the state of North Rhine-Westphalia or regions within it, such as the Rhine-Ruhr-region. Today it is part of the Museum Kunstpalast.

== History ==
In the 1970s it was opened as the Museum für Industrie und Wirtschaft ("Museum for Industry and Economy"). In the 1990s it changed its name, and also the underlying concept behind the displays.

Originally, more than 50% of the display was permanent, but nowadays there are changing exhibitions on several themes. For example, in 1998 there was an exhibition on design in the 1960s for three months, followed by one on the history of the VW Beetle. In 2000 there was a project showing the history, present and future scenarios of the Rhine-Ruhr region; and so on. The exhibitions are mostly based on political, historical, social or economical themes or phenomena, seen from a particular point of view. The museum specialises in photographic and new media collections.

In January 2020, the NRW Forum became part of the Kunstpalast.

== Building ==
NRW Forum is located in the Ehrenhof complex, built by Wilhelm Kreis in 1925–26, along with the Kunstpalast, located in Düsseldorf-Pempelfort precinct.

== Exhibitions (selected) ==
- „Mutanten – Die Deutschsprachige Comic Avantgarde.“ (1999–2000)
- „Anton Corbijn“ (2001)
- „Media Lounge/The Hire“' (2002)
- „Helmut Newton – Work“ (2003)
- „Der Traum vom Turm“' (2004–2005)
- „Martin Kippenberger – Bodencollage“ (2005)
- „Alexander McQueen – Catwalk Videos“ (2005)
- „Vivienne Westwood: Prinzessin Punk“ (2006)
- „Bruce Nauman – Mental Exercises“ (2006–2007)
- „Bilder im Kopf“ (2007)
- „Andy Warhol – Myths“ (2008)
- „Radical Advertising“ (2008)
- „Albert Watson – Best of“ (21. September 2008 – 18. Januar 2009)
- „Michel Comte – Retrospektive“ (1. Februar – 10. Mai 2009)
- „Deanna Templeton – Scratch My Name on Your Arm“ (4. April – 10. Mai 2009)
- „U.F.O. – Grenzgänge zwischen Kunst und Design“ (23. Mai – 5. Juli 2009)
- „Armin Mueller-Stahl – Übermalungen eines Drehbuchs“ (15. August – 27. September 2009)
- „Catwalks – Die spektakulärsten Modenschauen“ (26. Juli – 1. November 2009)
- Robert Mapplethorpe (2010)
- Der rote Bulli – Stephen Shore und die Neue Düsseldorfer Fotografie (2011)
- Gender Studies Bettina Rheims (2012)
- Bryan Adams (2013)
- #cute. Islands of Happiness? (2020) curated by Dr. Birgit Richard
