= Deanna Templeton =

American artist and photographer

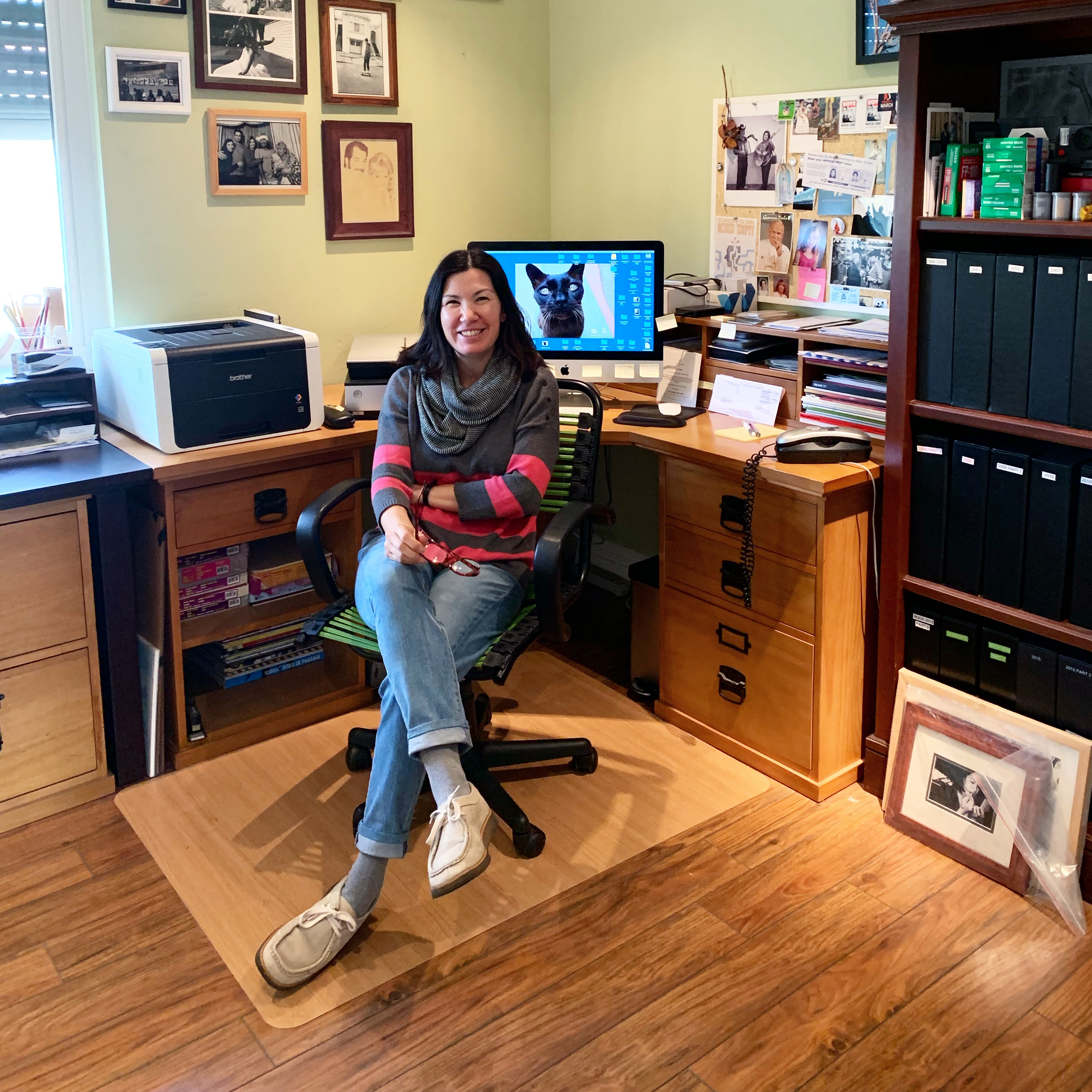
- Templeton, Huntington Beach, 2018.
- Born: July 19, 1969 (age 56); Huntington Beach, California
- Known for: Photographer
- Spouse: Ed Templeton (m. 1991)

Deanna Templeton (born July 19, 1969 in Huntington Beach, California) is an American artist working primarily in photography. She lives and works in Huntington Beach.

== Early life ==
Deanna Templeton was born and raised in Huntington Beach, California. As a teenager, she discovered and was inspired by punk rock.

Deanna met Ed Templeton at a Red Hot Chili Peppers concert when he was 15 and she was 18. She recalls, "[h]e looked older and I looked younger so we met somewhere in the middle." Two weeks later, they went on a date, and two weeks after that, they were girlfriend and boyfriend. The two were married three years later in 1991. They both became vegetarian in 1990, vegan in 1991, and have not consumed meat or dairy products since.

== Art career ==
Templeton started to pursue photography at the age of 15 when her mother gifted her a camera. She used the camera to explore and document the local Los Angeles punk scene.

Early in her photography career, Templeton traveled with her husband and other professional skateboarders on their international tours, documenting the scene. Templeton's photographs from that period embody a unique perspective of skateboarding and skateboard culture because they reflect a female perspective of a sport which, at the time, was documented and dominated by men. In 2007, she published the book Your Logo Here; the photographs capture young girls offering their bodies to their skateboard idols for them to sign and for skate companies to "brand" with spray paint templates. Photographs from Your Logo Here culminated in an exhibition titled Scratch My Name On Your Arm, which traveled throughout Europe in 2009; drawing inspiration from the punk scene that inspired her as a teenager, Templeton appropriated her exhibition's title from a Smiths song.

She continued to explore the body with her 2016 book Swimming Pool, in which she photographed her friends who were invited to skinny dip in her pool; she documented these scenes over eight years in both color and black-and-white photographs.

For around 20 years, Templeton made street portraits of young women that she collected in the book What She Said (2021). The portraits are contrasted with journal entries from her own adolescence in the 1980s.

== Exhibitions ==
=== Solo ===
- 2005: Only Once, Museum Het Domein, Sittard, Netherlands
- 2007: Your Logo Here, Australian Centre for Photography, Sydney, Australia
- 2008: The Swimming Pool, New Image Art, Los Angeles, California
- 2009: Scratch My Name on Your Arm, NRW-Forum, Dusseldorf, Germany, 2009
- 2010: Scratch My Name On Your Arm, Schunck Museum, Heerlen, Netherlands
- 2016: What She Said, Little Big Man Gallery, Los Angeles, CA
- 2019: Contemporary Suburbium, Utah Museum of Contemporary Art, Salt Lake City, UT, 2019

=== Group ===
- 2003 Skate Culture: The Art of Skateboarding, Contemporary Art Center of Virginia, Virginia Beach, VA
- 2005 Everyone Sees the Sun, Loyal Gallery, Stockholm, Sweden
- 2006 Skate Culture, Preus Museum, Horten, Norway
- 2008 Mooi niet, Government, Maastricht, Netherlands
- 2008 Sea No Evil, Riverside Art Museum, Riverside, CA
- 2009 Rites De Passage, Schunck Museum, Heerlen, Netherlands
- 2018–2019: This Land, Pier 24 Photography, San Francisco, CA

== Publications ==
=== Photography books by Templeton ===
- Cube, Sartoria, 2005.
- Your Logo Here, P.A.M., 2007. ASIN B01K3K448K
- 17 Days, Self-published, 2008. ASIN B001INC6VO
- Scratch My Name on Your Arm, Heerlen: Schunck, 2011. ISBN 978-1942884002.
- They Should Never Touch The Ground, Los Angeles: Deadbeat Club, 2015.
- The Swimming Pool, Portland: Nazraeli, 2016. ISBN 978-1942884002.
- The Moon Has Lost Her Memory, Tokyo: Super Labo, 2017. ISBN 978-4908512117
- Contemporary Suburbium, Portland: Nazraeli Press, 2017. ISBN 978-1590054789. Co-Authored by Ed Templeton.
- Yesterday, Tokyo: Super Labo, 2019. ISBN 978-4908512117
- What She Said. London: Mack, 2021. ISBN 978-1-913620-05-9.

=== Publications with contributions by Templeton ===
- Body: The Photography Book, London: Thames & Hudson. 2019. ISBN 978-0500021583
- This Land, San Francisco: Pier 24 Photography, 2018. Exhibition catalogue. ISBN 978-1597110037.
- The Swimming Pool in Photography, Berlin: Hatje Cantz, 2018. ISBN 978-3775744096.
- Girl on Girl: Art and Photography in the Age of the Female Gaze, London: Laurence King, 2017. ISBN 978-1780679556
- Le Petit Voyeur: Photo Album Volume 1 (Deanna Templeton Cover), Paris: Le Petit Voyeur, 2017.
