= The Living Sisters =

US musical group

- Origin: Los Angeles, California, USA
- Genres: Folk; Country; Pop; Harmony
- Years active: 2006–present
- Labels: Vanguard Records
- Members: Alex Lilly; Becky Stark; Inara George; Eleni Mandell

The Living Sisters is a female folk group consisting of Alex Lilly, Inara George, Becky Stark and Eleni Mandell. The members began collaborating in 2006 during breaks from their other projects. In 2009 they began recordings for their first album Love To Live, which was finished and released in 2010.

In March 2011, the video for "How Are You Doing" which was directed by Michel Gondry was released.

== Discography ==
- Love to Live (2010)
- Run for Cover (2013)
- Harmony is Real: Songs for a Happy Holiday (2014)
