= Mark Fitzloff =

American advertising creative director

Mark Fitzloff (born February 3, 1971, in Milwaukee, Wisconsin) is an American advertising creative director and the founder of the Opinionated advertising agency. He is most known for his work at Wieden+Kennedy on Nike and Coca-Cola, and for reviving Procter & Gamble's Old Spice brand. He is also the executive producer and screenwriter of Tempbot, Neill Blomkamp's short film.

Mark worked as a writer, creative director and Executive Creative director in the Portland, Oregon, headquarters of Wieden+Kennedy, Nike's advertising agency. Mark ran W+K's Portland office with partners Susan Hoffman and Tom Blessington. He also oversaw the global network of WK as global ECD.

Mark started working at W+K in 1999. His created multiple super bowl commercials, and has won awards from Cannes, Clios and the One Show, and leading new business for W+K including Coca-Cola, P&G and Levi's. He has also been interviewed in several business and industry trade publications, as well as on Fox News, discussing creativity in Super Bowl advertising.

In 2015, Mark served as the Titanium Jury President at the Cannes Lions International Festival of Creativity. Mark founded his own agency called Opinionated in 2017. Opinionated has done work for adidas, Unilever and Pepsico among other notable brands and has been named AdAge Small Agency of the Year five years in a row.
