= Eleni Mandell =

American singer-songwriter

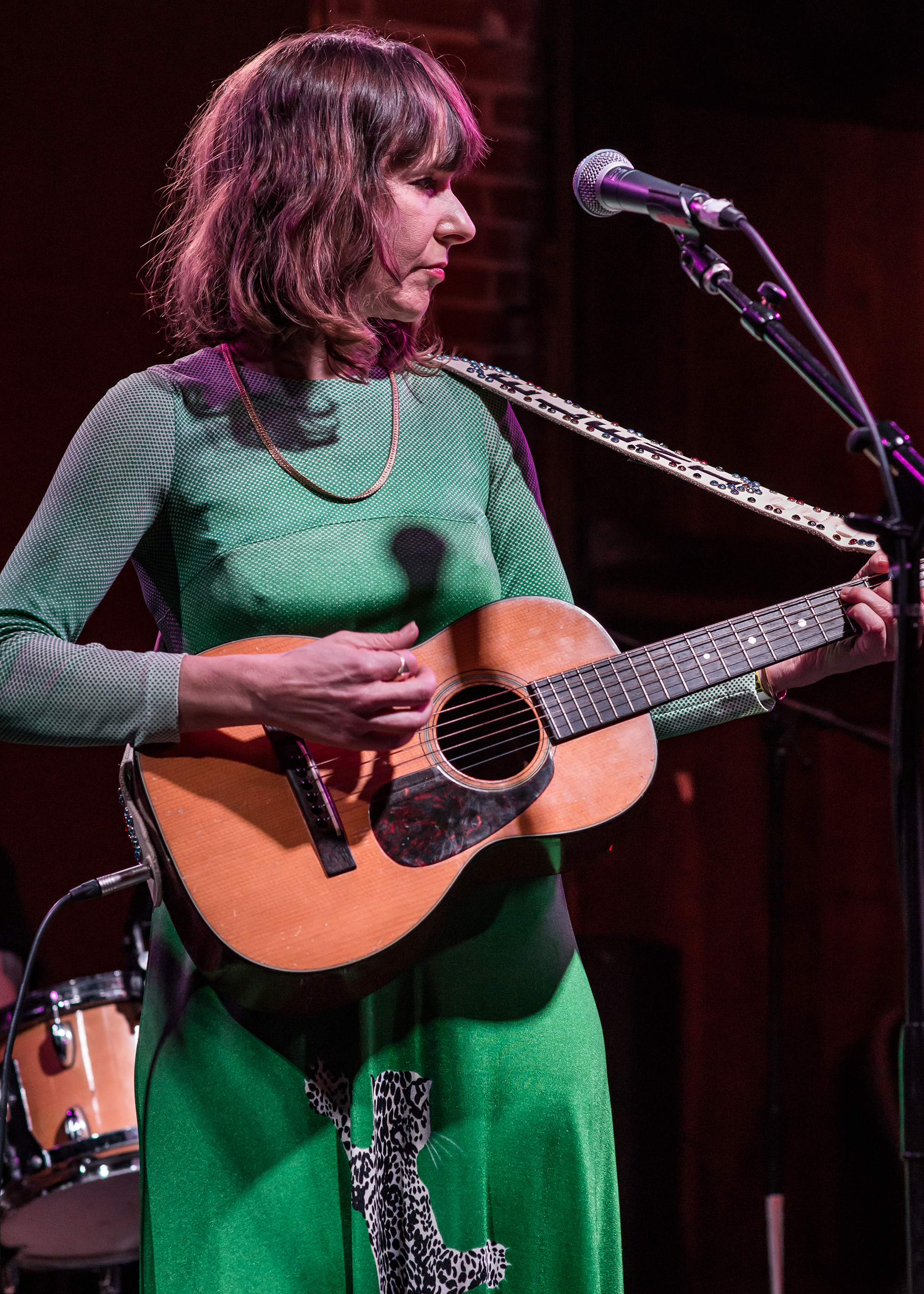
- Performing in Los Angeles in 2017

Background information
- Born: October 10, 1969 (age 57); Los Angeles, California, U.S.
- Origin: Los Angeles, California
- Genres: Pop, country, folk, jazz
- Instrument: guitar
- Years active: 1990s–present
- Labels: Zedtone, Yep Roc, Make My Day, Heart of a Champion, Mr. Charles, Space Baby, Bonsound
- Website: http://www.elenimandell.com

Eleni Mandell (born October 10, 1969) is an American singer-songwriter. Since 2000, she has published albums through Zedtone Records in Toronto, Ontario, which in 2012 began licensing her releases to Yep Roc in the United States, and Make My Day in Europe. She is also a member of folk supergroup The Living Sisters with Inara George and Becky Stark.

Mandell attended punk and underground rock shows while growing up in Los Angeles in the 1980s. She was inspired as a young songwriter by Tom Waits, X, Bob Dylan, Leonard Cohen, and Randy Newman. Chuck E. Weiss, a socialite musician and associate of Tom Waits, was a mentor to Mandell.

Eleni Mandell's first album, Wishbone (1998), was produced by Jon Brion. Her second album, Thrill, was released in 2000, earning her comparisons to PJ Harvey and Tom Waits. Around 2001, The New Yorker magazine described Mandell "as perhaps the best unsigned artist in the business." In the same year, Mandell won the Los Angeles Regional Poll at The 1st Independent Music Awards for the song "Pauline." In 2003, she released Country For True Lovers, which was produced by X guitarist Tony Gilkyson. Miracle of Five (2007) featured contributions from Wilco guitarist Nels Cline and X drummer DJ Bonebrake.

Mandell's eighth full-length release, I Can See the Future (2012), was her first album to be licensed by Yep Roc, a U.S. record label. Produced by Joe Chiccarelli (The Shins, The Strokes, White Stripes), guest appearances include drummer Joey Waronker (Beck, Atoms for Peace), saxophonist Steve Berlin (Los Lobos), a duet with Benji Hughes, backing vocals throughout by Becky Stark and Inara George (The Living Sisters), and arrangements by Nate Walcott (Bright Eyes).

== Discography ==
=== Albums ===
- Wishbone | Mr. Charles (1998)
- Thrill | Zedtone (2000)
- Snakebite | Space Baby (2001)
- Country for True Lovers | Zedtone (2003)
- Afternoon | Zedtone (2004)
- Miracle of Five | Zedtone (2007)
- Artificial Fire | Zedtone (2009)
- I Can See the Future | Yep Roc (2012)
- Let's Fly A Kite | Yep Roc (2014)
- Dark Lights Up | Yep Roc (2015)
- Wake Up Again | Yep Roc (2019)

=== Live ===
- Voxhall and WUK (live) | Mr. Charles (2007)

=== Singles and EPs ===
- "Turn On the Lights" b/w "I Still Think About You" (7-inch) | Heart of a Champion (2001)
- "Los Fishes" (split 7-inch with Mike Gunther) | Heart of a Champion (2004)
- Maybe, Yes [EP] | Heart of a Champion (2004)
- "Dis-Moi Au Revoir Encore" b/w "Francais 1" (7-inch) | Bonsound (2007)

=== Also featured on (as full group member) ===
- The Grabs – Sex, Fashion, And Money | The Grabs Records (2005)
- The Living Sisters – Love To Live | Vanguard (2010)
- The Grabs – Political Disco | Heart OF A Champion (2011)
- The Living Sisters – Run For Cover | Vanguard (2013)
- The Living Sisters – Harmony Is Real | Vanguard (2014)
