= Aaron Rose =

American film director, artist, exhibition curator, and writer

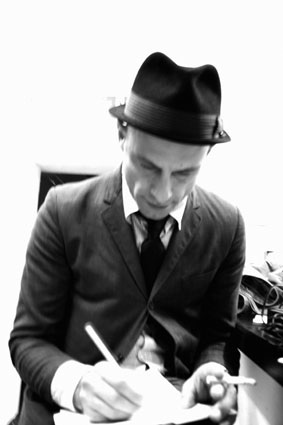
- Rose in 2008
- Born: Portland, Oregon, U.S.
- Occupations: director, producer, writer, independent curator, artist
- Years active: 1992–present

Aaron Rose is an American film director, artist, exhibition curator and writer. Rose is known as the co-director of Beautiful Losers, a film that focuses on an art movement which includes artists such as Barry McGee, Margaret Kilgallen, Steven "Espo" Powers, Chris Johanson, Harmony Korine and Shepard Fairey.

== Early life ==
Rose grew up in Calabasas in the San Fernando Valley near Los Angeles and started attending punk and mod shows in the mid 1980s. From high school, he was accepted to Pasadena's Art Center College of Design, but dropped out after only one semester. Rose stated later "For me, art school seemed like a death sentence."

== Alleged Gallery ==
Rose moved to New York City in 1989 and after a string of odd jobs, at the age of 21, he opened Alleged Gallery on Ludlow Street on the Lower East Side. The gallery would go on to exhibit the works of many young artists from the art, skateboarding, graffiti and fashion worlds. As writer Carlo McCormick wrote in Zing Magazine in 2001, "What Alleged really accomplished was a profound understanding of the moment at hand. The ground zero of the zeitgeist where there is no substantive difference between any creative medium- and a way of translating and articulating this opaque ephemeral vernacular into a concrete visual language..." Alleged Gallery eventually grew to have branches in New York City and Tokyo. During this time Rose also held a job at MTV Networks producing and directing on-air promos. In 2005, he published Young Sleek and Full of Hell with Drago. The book is based on the Alleged Gallery and the 1990s underground art scene in New York where he collected visuals and testimony from over 100 artists including Mark Gonzales, Ed Templeton, Thomas Campbell, Phil Frost, Spike Jonze, Sofia Coppola, Sonic Youth, Terry Richardson.

== Beautiful Losers ==
Rose was co-curator of the Beautiful Losers touring art exhibit, and edited the collected art book—released by Iconoclast and Distributed Art Publishers in 2004—featuring the work and artists of the tour. The exhibition toured the world through 2009. He is also a director of the award-winning feature documentary film Beautiful Losers, which premiered at the 2008 SXSW Film Festival. The film was released theatrically in November, 2008.

== Film career ==
In 2009, After the release of Beautiful Losers, Rose directed a short-form documentary called Become a Microscope - 90 Statements on Sister Corita, with original music by Money Mark and Becky Stark. The 22 minute film tells the story of Sister Mary Corita, the California nun who was also a political artist. In 2010 he completed "Portraits of Braddock", for IFC (Independent Film Channel). A television movie following the trials and tribulations of a small Pennsylvania steel town, and its young mayor, John Fetterman. Rose also directed "Pendarvia", a short documentary on the musical group The Decemberists which was released January, 2011. In 2019 he directed a short documentary Hamburger Eyes which focuses on a tight-knit community of street photographers in San Francisco dedicated to capturing both the unseen and iconic moments of everyday life. He has also directed numerous short films and commercials for television. He is currently working on his first feature film.

In America, Rose is signed as a director with the Los Angeles production company The Directors Bureau which was founded by Roman Coppola and Mike Mills and also represents Wes Anderson, Melodie McDaniel, and Sofia Coppola. He is also represented by Iconoclast in Germany.

In 2009, he worked as a creative director at Wieden+Kennedy to help create WKE (WKEntertainment), a content-driven entertainment channel and production house. At WKE, Rose was the producer of numerous television projects including Califunya, D.I.Y. America, and Don't Move Here, which he also directed.

== Curatorial/Fine Art Practice ==
Rose was an associate curator along with Roger Gastman and Jeffrey Deitch on the museum exhibition "Art in the Streets" which opened at the Los Angeles Museum of Contemporary Art (MoCA) in April 2011.

In early 2016, Rose co-founded The Conversation, a multi-media art space in Berlin along with curator/gallerist Johann Haehling von Lanzenauer. The project is a progressive gallery space, where concepts in all mediums can come to fruition through a diverse and talented international group of creative protagonists. As an offshoot of this project, Rose established La Rosa Social Club. Conceived as a touring art bar, created by artists, and considered as a social sculpture, the project has been realized in Los Angeles, Sydney, Berlin and Abu Dhabi and continues tour the world.

As a visual artist, Rose has exhibited internationally including Hope Gallery (Los Angeles), Postmasters (New York), Supreme (New York), Colette (Paris), and Dover Street Market (London). He is currently represented by Circleculture Gallery in Berlin. His 2021 exhibition "Suitcase City" at The Lodge in Los Angeles saw the artist transform the gallery into a makeshift luggage store, where he created custom wallpaper and built displays from recycled retail fixtures he purchased from junkyards. In 2009 Rose was chosen to create a signature shoe model for DC Shoes based on his artwork. He has also created clothing designs for Uniqlo, Nike, FACT and Shepard Fairey's Subliminal brand as well as other boutique apparel collaborations.

== Make Something!! ==
Rose is the co-founder of Make Something!!, a non-profit 501c3 art education program for teens. Each Make Something!! workshop is about teaching young people to use their own ingenuity and available resources to get something done. The program believes that creativity and self-expression are skills necessary in all factions of life and promotes a community of support to face challenges together. Working with a small team, the program has partnered with school districts in Los Angeles, New York, Paris, San Francisco, Melbourne, Tokyo and Miami, now having held over fifty creative workshops in cities worldwide,

== Writing and publishing ==
In late 2011, Rose co-authored (with Brian Roettinger and Mandy Kahn) "Collage Culture: Examining the 21st Century Identity Crisis," a book of criticism published by Swiss company JRP-Ringier. Rose's essay for the book, titled "The Death of Subculture" has been described as an impassioned call to arms, urging the next generation of artists to end the collage era by adopting a philosophy of creative innovation. Rose's publishing imprint Alleged Press has released books featuring the art of Ari Marcopoulos, Ed Templeton, Mike Mills, Barry McGee, Chris Johanson, and Gusmano Cesaretti. He is also co-editor of ANP Quarterly, a free arts magazine published by RVCA.

== Works ==
=== Selected films ===
- Bedtime Story (2021)
- No Age: Head Sport Full Face (2020)
- Hamburger Eyes (2019)
- Night For Change (2018)
- A No Good Day In Tuckertown (2017)
- Fade to Blue (2016)
- Bombonice (2015)
- The Bubble (2015)
- Soko: Love Letter (2014)
- Fashion At Work (2014)
- Cake Walk (2013)
- Boom Town (2013)
- New York LA LA LA (2013)
- The Gallerina (2012)
- Cat Power: Nothin' But Time (2012)
- Chris Johanson, The Generic Man (2011)
- El Mundo Es Tuyo for Opening Ceremony (2010)
- Wild Goodness (2010)
- Portraits Of Braddock (2010)
- Pendarvia (2010)
- Become A Microscope: 90 Statements On Sister Corita (2009)
- Beautiful Losers (2008)

=== Selected books ===
- Blackout Poems (2023)
- Gusmano Cesaretti: Fragments of Los Angeles (2013)
- Collage Culture: Examining The 21st Century Identity Crisis (2012)
- Barry McGee: THR (2010)
- Art In The Streets (2010)
- Mike Mills: Graphics Films (2009)
- Ed Templeton: Deformer (2008)
- Harmony Korine: The Collected Fanzines (2008)
- Chris Johanson: Please Listen I have Something To Tell You About What Is (2007)
- Beautiful Losers (2006)
- Ari Marcopoulos: Out & About (2006)
- Young, Sleek & Full Of Hell (2005)
- Ed Templeton: Teenage Smokers (1999)
- Dysfunctional (1999)
