= Radio23 =

Radio 23
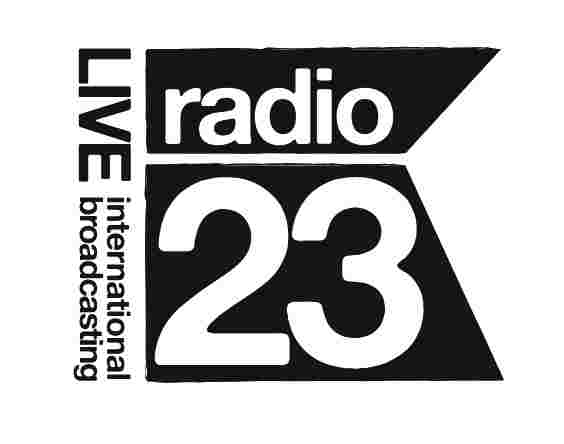
- Portland, Oregon; United States

Programming
- Format: Freeform

Ownership
- Owner: Cascade Community Radio, Inc Webcast]

History
- First air date: April 23, 2009; 17 years ago
- Last air date: July 2015; 10 years ago

Radio23 was a non-commercial, freeform radio station founded by Programming Director Jeff Hylton Simmons and launched in 2009. It was shut down in July 2015. The successor called Freeform Portland went on air in April 2016. Based out of Portland, Oregon, where it supported the local artists and community, the station's goal was to provide an international artistic platform for home broadcasters around the world, and to teach anyone around the world how to create radio with a computer and an internet connection. Radio23 is connected with radio stations that include Cascade Community Radio, Hearth Music, WFMU, KDVS, CKUT-FM, KZME, KBOO, Error FM, and Willamette Radio, and also with the magazine War, Semen and Grooviness.

== Events ==
Since its official launch in May 2009, Radio 23 covered many festivals; some of these include the Primavera Festival, NYC's No Fun Fest, PDX Pop Now!, Lockstock, North Side Festival, the Portland Institute for Contemporary Art's Time-Based Art Festival, and Eye & Ear Fest. Radio23's shows include Cinema Terrorisme, Ola's Kool Kitchen and Nine 11 Thesaurus.

== Programming ==
Radio23's programming included types of popular music that include rock, indie, jazz, folk, R&B, experimental music, and hip-hop. It also featured band interviews and live broadcasts.

== See also ==
- WKEntertainment
- WFMU
- List of Internet radio stations
- Freeform Portland
