= Tod Swank =

American skateboarder

Tod Swank is an American former professional skateboarder, company owner (Tum Yeto distribution and Foundation skateboards), photographer, and musician. His mid-1980s skateboard 'zine, Swank Zine, was among the original wave of underground xeroxed press.

== Career ==
Swank achieved notoriety as one of the earliest American skaters to compete in European contests, placing third in the 1985 French Open (hosted by the SCAF, the Skateboard Club of Fontainbleu) and seventh place that same year in the Scandinavian Open '1985.

In 1987 Swank was featured on the cover of Transworld Skateboarding as the subject of iconic photo titled The Push, an image shot by J. Grant Brittain, then senior photo editor of the magazine.

One image stood out—the frame with Tod simply pushing along the sidewalk. It was so basic—it was the foundation of skateboarding, it was the first thing we all learn to do after stepping on a board, it was the essence of this activity we, who do it, love. We all have this in common: we push.
