= Lavender Diamond =

American band

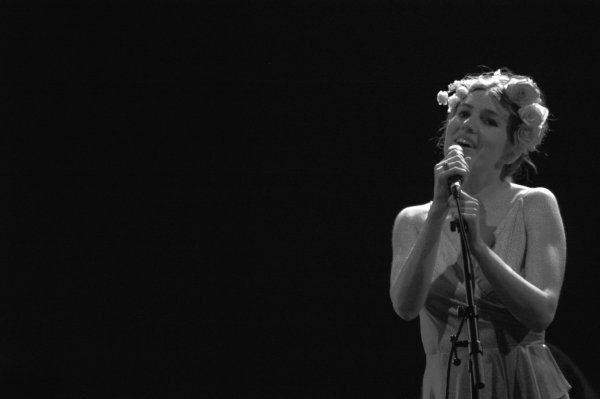
- Becky Stark in Brussels (2007)

Background information
- Origin: Los Angeles, California, USA
- Genres: Folk, country, indie rock, folk rock, punk
- Years active: 2003-present
- Labels: Matador Records; Rough Trade Records; Paracadute
- Members: Becky Stark; Steve Gregoropoulos; Ron Regé Jr. Jeffrey Rosenberg
- Past members: Devon Williams

Lavender Diamond is an American, Los Angeles-based band, fronted by singer Becky Stark.

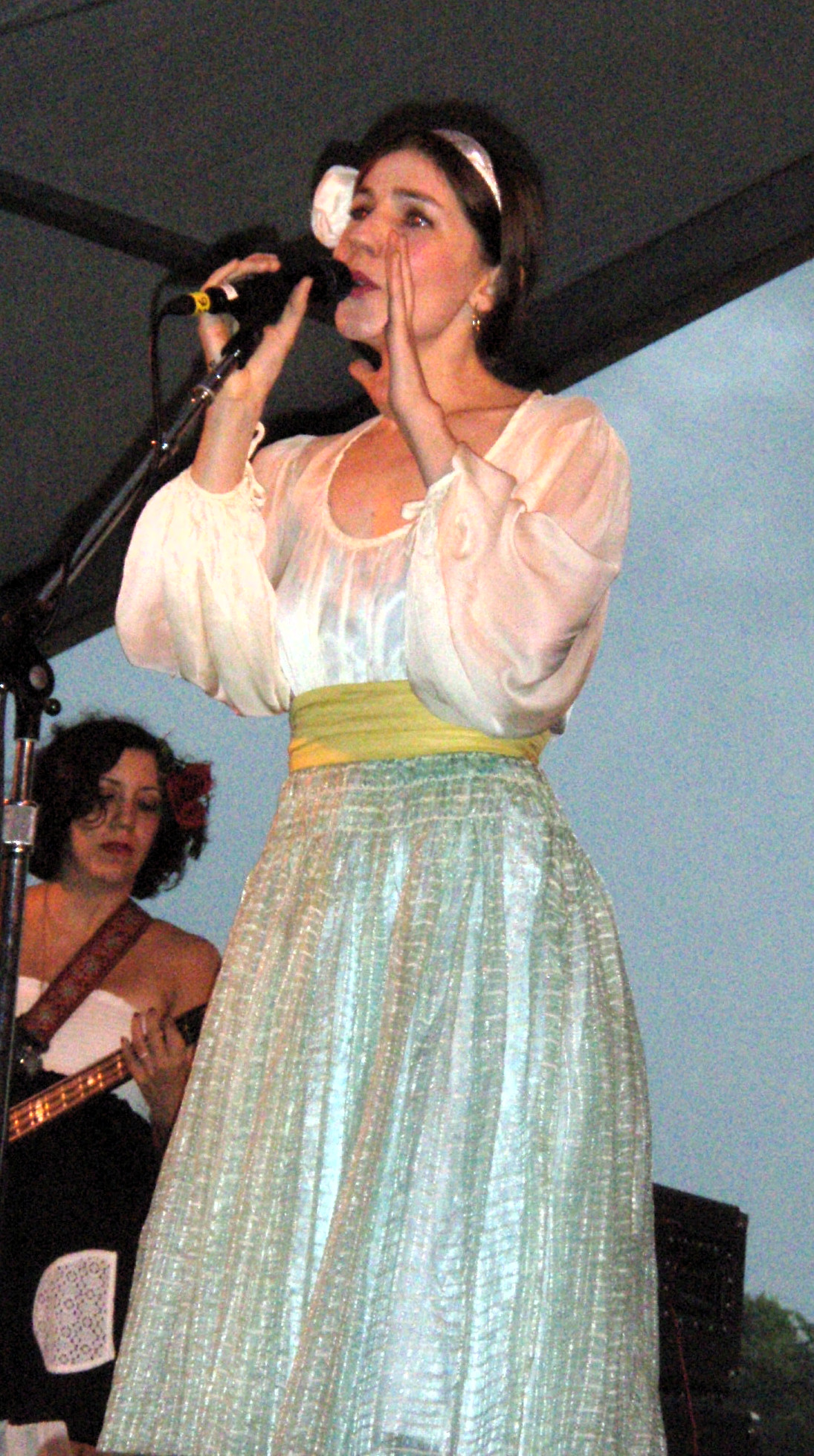
Becky Stark, performing at the Newport Folk Festival (2 August 2008)

== History ==
While living in Providence, Rhode Island, Stark began performing as Lavender Diamond in a play that she and puppeteer Xander Marro wrote, created and toured with called Birdsongs of the Bauharoque inspired by the work of artist Paul Laffoley. A self-produced CD of Stark's songs accompanied the tour in a hand-sewn, silkscreened sleeve. Lavender Diamond became a duo and eventually a four-piece band after Stark relocated to Los Angeles. With the help of local patrons Brian Kaneda and Josh Scuteri, Lavender Diamond self-released a four-song EP and performed at L.A.'s ArthurFest, at South by Southwest in Austin, Texas, and at the CMJ New Music Seminar in New York City. In 2006 Lavender Diamond signed to Rough Trade Records in Europe, and Matador Records in the U.S., and toured and performed with The Decemberists for three weeks.

In 2007 the band released its first full-length album, Imagine Our Love and appeared on the Madonna tribute/charity record, Through the Wilderness. In 2009 they covered "Purple Rain" for SPIN Magazine's tribute to Prince's Purple Rain.

The band parted ways with Matador and went on hiatus for a few years while its members continued to work and play in other projects. In 2011, the original Lavender Diamond lineup reunited for a few concerts in the Los Angeles area, and in 2012 released their second album, Incorruptible Heart.

Bandmember/cartoonist Ron Rege Jr. furnishes Lavender Diamond with all of its artwork.

== Members ==
- Becky Stark — vocals
- Steve Gregoropoulos — piano, vocals
- Ron Regé Jr. — drums, artwork
- Jeffrey Rosenberg — guitar, vocals

== Former members ==
- Devon Williams — guitar, vocals
- Jeff Kwong — guitar

== Discography ==
=== Albums ===
- Artifacts Of The Winged 12-song solo CD (2003, self-released)
- Imagine Our Love full-length album (2007)
- Incorruptible Heart full-length album (2012)
- "Now Is The Time" full-length album (2020)

=== Singles and EPs ===
- "When Are You Coming Home?" b/w "Wild" (2003, self-released)
- Themepark Ashtray 7" with Vague Angels (2004, Pretty Activity)
- Cavalry of Light EP (2005, self-released)
- "Christmas Time Celebration / The Song Of Impossible Occurrences" 7" with The Queens of Sheeba, Devendra Banhart (2005, Cold Sweat records)
- Open Your Heart EP (2007, Rough Trade Records, with Colin Meloy)
- "Everybody's Heart's Breaking Now" (2012, Paracadute)

=== Compilation appearances ===
- Hen House Studios Anthology 3, 2003, performing "Lavender Diamond- Emptiness is a Conductor" (2003, Hen House Studios)
- Through the Wilderness a tribute to Madonna performing Like A Prayer (2007, Manimal Vinyl Records)
- Purplish Rain: A 25th Anniversary Tribute to Prince's Purple Rain, performing Purple Rain (2009, SPIN Magazine)
- The Switch (Music from the Motion Picture), performing "Open Your Heart" (2010, Rhino Entertainment)
- The soundtrack of game Space Ducks, performing Moment of Laughter (2012)

=== Mystical Unionists (Becky Stark and Ron Regé) ===
- An Introduction to The Mystical Union of Souls 5-song CD
- "Sketches" for The Craft of Consciousness 7"

== See also ==
- New Weird America
