= Tum Yeto =

Skateboard distribution company

Tum Yeto, Inc.
- Industry: Skateboarding
- Founded: San Diego, United States (1989)
- Founder: Tod Swank
- Headquarters: San Diego, United States
- Area served: Global
- Key people: Tod Swank, Ed Templeton
- Products: Skateboard decks, skateboard wheels, skateboard trucks, skateboard shoes, apparel
- Brands: Foundation, Toy Machine, Ruckus, Pig Wheels, Dekline, Habitat

Tum Yeto is a skateboard distribution company that operates out of San Diego, California, United States.

== History ==
Founded in 1989 by former professional skateboarder, Tod Swank, Tum Yeto manufactures, distributes, exports and wholesales the Foundation, Toy Machine, Pig Wheels, Dekline, Ruckus, and Habitat brands. Tum Yeto were involved in a legal case resolved in 2009 in the UK regarding the length of a "reasonable" period of notice.

=== Foundation ===
Longtime Foundation team member, Corey Duffel, celebrated his 10-year anniversary as a Foundation sponsored rider in February 2013. The commemoration event was held at the headquarters of international skateboarding magazine, Transworld SKATEboarding, in Carlsbad, California, U.S.

Taylor Smith was assigned professional status with Foundation in July 2014 and Smith was informed at a surprise party that was held in California, US. Swank and Duffel were in attendance at the surprise party, and a video part titled "Tee Hee" was featured on the Thrasher magazine's website to coincide with the announcement.

=== Habitat partnership ===
Following the 2014 closure of the DNA Distribution skateboard company, which distributed the Alien Workshop and Habitat brands, an announcement that the Habitat brand had joined the "Tum Yeto Collective" was published on July 8, 2014. The announcement was presented in the form of a 5-minute, 28-second-long video, featured on Tony Hawk's web-based "RIDE Channel", which was filmed and edited by Habitat cofounder Joe Castrucci. The text beneath the video states that the first Habitat products to be sold after the transition will be available during the American summer of 2014.

In an interview following the announcement, Habitat videographer Brennan Conroy explained the arrangement between the two companies:

They [Tum Yeto] didn’t buy us, they are just distributing Habitat. It’s all gonna be based on sales and how much we sell is how much we will make. They are gonna have to dig into their pockets for the initial cost of the production of the boards, which is a lot of money. But it’s gonna come down to, you guys sold 1000 boards, well, here’s your percent, and here’s what you can do with the money.
