= Cheryl Dunn =

American filmmaker and photographer

Cheryl Dunn is an American documentary filmmaker and photographer. She has made two feature films, Everybody Street (2013) and Moments Like This Never Last (2020). She has had three books of photographs published: Bicycle Gangs of New York (2005), Some Kinda Vocation (2007) and Festivals are Good (2015).

== Early life and education ==
Dunn was born in New Jersey. She graduated from Rutgers University in New Jersey with a BFA in art history.

== Career and work ==
After moving to New York City in the mid 1980s, Dunn spent a large part of her career documenting city streets and the people who leave their mark there: graffiti writers, artists, skaters, boxers, bikers, protesters, and assorted characters. In the late 1990s she began to focus on filmmaking, creating films about artists of her generation who have influenced urban life through their own work.

Her films have played at film festivals including, Tribeca, Edinburgh, Rotterdam, Hotdocs, Los Angeles, Havana, and on PBS.

Dunn's work has been exhibited at Tate Modern in London, Deitch Projects in New York City, and the Art in the Streets exhibition at the Geffen Contemporary MOCA.

She was one of the subjects in the documentary, book, and traveling museum exhibition Beautiful Losers.

Her documentary film Everybody Street (2013) about photographers who have used New York City streets as a major subject in their work. The film includes Bruce Davidson, Jill Freedman, Joel Meyerowitz, Bruce Gilden, Mary Ellen Mark, Jamel Shabazz, Ricky Powell, Martha Cooper, Elliot Erwitt, Rebecca Lepkoff, Boogie, Clayton Patterson, Jeff Mermelstein with Max Kozloff and Lucy Sante. Everybody Street world-premiered at Hot Docs Canadian International Documentary Festival in Toronto in spring 2013. It was since shown at Seaport Museum of New York, NY, 2010; Format International Photography Festival, Derby, UK, 2011; Tate Modern London, July 2011; HotDocs, Canadian International Documentary Film Festival, 2013; T-Mobile New Horizons Film Festival, Wroclaw, Poland, 2013; Raindance Film Festival, London, 2013; FOAM Unseen Festival, Amsterdam, 2013; Atlanta Celebrates Photography, Atlanta, 2013; Independent Photography Festival, Melbourne, 2013; Raindance International Film Festival, Berlin, 2013; Nitehawk Cinema, New York, 2013; Cinefamily, Los Angeles, 2013; Miami Street Photography Festival, Miami, 2013; Miami Beach Cinematheque, Miami, 2013; ARTEFIERA at Cineteca Bologna, Bologna, Italy, 2014; Los Angeles Center of Photography (LACP), Los Angeles, 2014; ICA, London, 2014; Gene Siskel Theater, Chicago, 2014; FilmBar, Phoenix, 2014; Rialto Theater, Amsterdam, 2014; Hollywood Theatre Portland, 2014; The Hepworth Wakefield, Wakefield, UK, 2014; Bloor Hot Docs Cinema, Toronto, 2014; Salem Film Festival, Salem, 2014; Kentucky Museum of Art & Culture, Louisville, 2014; EPOS International Art Film Festival, Tel Aviv, 2014; Utah Museum of Fine Arts, Salt Lake City, 2014.

Her second documentary film, Moments Like This Never Last (2020) about Dash Snow, a graffiti writer and downtown artist. The film includes Jeffrey Deitch, Leo Fitzpatrick, Blair Hanson, Ryan McGinley, David Rimanelli, Neville Wakefield. Moments Like This Never Last world-premiered at DOC NYC, 2020 it was released in theaters August 20, 2021 and released for online streaming September 3, 2021.

== Filmography ==
- Pro Abortion by Susan Cianciolo (shot and directed segment). Shown at Rotterdam International Film Festival 2-1997; Edinburgh Film Festival 9-1996.
- Sped. Shown at Moving Pictures. Dagkrant – 26th International Film Festival Rotterdam 1997; Raygun screening Los Angeles, CA Feb 18, 1997; Edinburgh International Film Fest Scotland 8-1999, 8–2001.
- Adventure Divas, Havana Film Festival 12-1999
- Backworlds for Words. Shown at Edinburgh International Film Festival, Scotland 8-1999; Dance on Screen Film Fest, London 11-1999; Cut and Paste Film Festival. Iowa City, IA, 2000.
- Peace Consideration Community. Shown at Mirror ball Endinberg International Film Fest & Pre-feature presentations throughout the UK 1999; Warchild Benefit for the Yugoslavian refugee Program, 1999.
- Come Mute (10 min.) for the film Beautiful Losers. Shown at Res Screenings. Los Angeles, CA. 2005; Athens International Dance Film Festival 2004; Los Angeles Film Festival 2004.
- Bicycle Gangs of NY (2005). Shown at Garden State Film Festival, cell phones and train stations throughout the Republic of China, and Taiwan. March 2006; Tribeca Film Festival New York, NY. 2005; Darklight Film Festival, Dublin, Ireland. 2005; Raindance Film Festival, London, England. 2005; Palm Springs International Festival of Short Films, Palm Springs, CA. 2005; Bicycle Film Festival, San Francisco, CA, 2005.
- Creative Life Store, Yerba Buena Center for the Arts, San Francisco, CA; included in package for the book, Some Kind of Vocation (2007)
- Everybody Street (2013)
- Moments Like This Never Last (2020) – about Dash Snow

== Exhibitions ==
- Spit and Peanut Shells, American Pictures, Country Club, Cincinnati, Ohio, 2009
- Uncanny, Galleria Patricia Armocida, Milan, Italy, 2011
- Tagged, Phillips, Manhattan, NY, 2022
- Ways of Being, Kohler Arts Center, Sheboygan, WI, 2022
- Beyond Trend, Oakland museum, Oakland, CA, 2022
- Visual Language the art of protest Subliminal projects, Los Angeles, CA, 2023

== Publications ==
- Bicycle Gangs of New York. New York, NY: Distributed Art Publishers, 2005. ASIN B0063M65LW
- Some Kinda Vocation. Brooklyn, NY: Picturebox, Iconoclast, 2007. ISBN 0978972228
- Uncanny, split book with Alessandro Zuek Simonetti, SM, Milan, Italy, 2011.
- Festivals are Good. New York, NY: Damiani, 2015. ISBN 8862084668
