= Janice Grube =

American singer-songwriter

- Born: January 19, 1971 (age 55)
- Origin: Teaneck, New Jersey, United States
- Genres: Alternative rock, pop rock, alternative country, indie rock
- Occupations: Singer, songwriter
- Instruments: guitar, vocals
- Years active: 1994–2004
- Label: Tequemo Records (independent label)

Janice Grube is an American singer-songwriter based in Portland, Oregon. She was the voice and main songwriter for the Los Angeles band, Watsonville Patio.

After a few years removed from the music industry, Grube started WK Radio, Wieden+Kennedy's in house internet radio station. After a brief hiatus in summer 2009, WK Radio returns in September as WKE (WKEntertainment), W+K's new content driven entertainment channel. Filmmaker Aaron Rose was also hired to help create WKE alongside Grube and Bill Davenport.

Grube currently serves as WKE's content director and executive producer of several television projects, including 12, Don't Move Here, and Califunya.
