= WKEntertainment =

American production company

WKE
- Type: Subsidiary
- Industry: Entertainment
- Founded: 2001; 25 years ago
- Headquarters: Portland, Oregon, United States
- Key people: Dan Wieden, David Kennedy (Founders); Bill Davenport (CEO); Mark Fitzloff, Susan Hoffman, Aaron Rose (Creative director); Janice Grube (Content Director)
- Products: Film & radio
- Parent: Wieden+Kennedy

WKE (abbreviated from WKEntertainment or Wieden+Kennedy+Entertainment) is an independently owned American production company and arts and culture delivery channel, a subsidiary of the advertising agency Wieden+Kennedy. The site contains material from a number of contributors, as well as original materials created by W+K under the creative direction of filmmaker Aaron Rose.

== History ==
Wieden+Kennedy had created original contents for various brands under the name 'W+K Entertainment' since 2001, with Bill Davenport as CEO. Its productions include Battlegrounds, an MTV2 series showcasing street basketball; Ginga, a documentary about Brazilian soccer players; Road to Paris, documenting Lance Armstrong's path to his third Tour de France victory in 2001; and Say My Name, a worldwide documentary project about women by Nirit Peled.

Wieden+Kennedy's exploration into producing its own non-branded content was started after in early 2009 after five prior months of refinements with WK Radio, an internet radio station. WK Radio was created by singer-songwriter Janice Grube, in collaboration with Davenport and under the executive creative direction of Mark Fitzloff and Susan Hoffman. WK Radio broadcast DJs, live music performances and interviews with "low key emerging talents, musicians and designers", where staffers often pitch in as well as outside artists and musicians.

== Present ==
WK Radio stream was put on hiatus on mid-2009, and Wieden+Kennedy hired creative director and filmmaker Aaron Rose to help relaunch the station as entertainment content delivery platform and production house. The studio's first project is a daily recap coverage of Portland Institute for Contemporary Art Time-Based Art Festival 2009, done in collaboration with Portland Radio Authority and Radio23.

A full site launched in October 2009, with episodic shows such as:

- Califunya, a comedy variety show.
- Don't Move Here a look inside Portland's vibrant underground music scene
- DIY America, a documentary-based exploration into the American subcultures of skateboarding, graffiti, punk and hip hop.
- HOW TO!, a series of offbeat instructional shorts.
- 12, a documentary on Wieden+Kennedy's agency-disguised, experimental advertising school.
