= Ed Templeton =

American skateboarder and artist

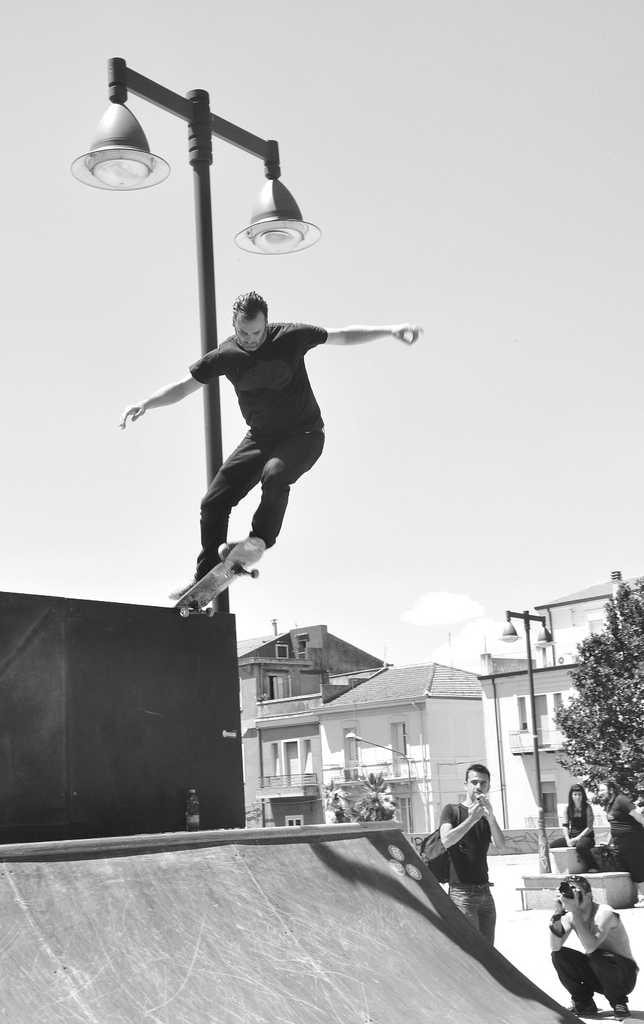
- Templeton in 2010
- Born: July 28, 1972 (age 53); Garden Grove, California, U.S.
- Education: Self taught
- Known for: Skateboarder; Contemporary Artist; Photographer
- Spouse: Deanna Templeton (m. 1991)
- Website: www.ed-templeton.com

Ed Templeton (born July 28, 1972) is an American professional skateboarder, contemporary artist, and photographer. He is the founder of the skateboard company, Toy Machine, a company that he continues to own and manage. He is based in Huntington Beach, California.

Templeton was inducted into the Skateboard Hall of Fame in 2016.

== Early life ==
Templeton was born in Garden Grove, California. His family lived in various places in Southern California before moving to Huntington Beach. He began skateboarding in 1985 in Huntington Beach, with friend, Jason Lee. In a 2012 interview, Templeton explained the commencement of his fascination with skateboarding:

The first thing that I ever saw was a kid skating down the street and he ollied up a curb; that was, you know, the thing that got me started. I thought that was the coolest thing ever, like, how could this guy just keep cruising down the street and not have to stop and pick up his board. By luck, [professional skateboarder and company owner] Mark Gonzales lived here in 1987, so, ah, one of my first, probably the first pro I ever saw, or realized was a pro skateboarder, was Mark Gonzales. I was in Sidewalk Surfer, the skate shop down here, and, that was on Main St., in Huntington Beach; we went in there to look at stickers, and there was a Skull Skates sticker which I fell in love with—I thought that was the coolest sticker ever ... so we followed him [Gonzales], ahh, back to his house, like stalkers, and, uh, and started skating the quarter-pipe [ramp] and he had disappeared, but then he came back down, did, like, a three, four-foot high "judo air" ... I remember being pretty floored, floored by that.

Templeton married his wife, Deanna Templeton, in 1991. They both became vegetarian in 1990, vegan in 1991 and have not consumed meat or dairy products since.

Templeton has avoided alcohol for most of his life and does not smoke or use other recreational drugs.

== Professional skateboarding ==
Templeton became a professional skateboarder a month before graduating from high school signing with New Deal Skateboards in 1990. He left New Deal in 1992 to initiate two short-lived companies, "TV" and "Television" (both with professional skateboarder, Mike Vallely).

=== Toy Machine ===
Following the demise of both TV and television, Templeton founded Toy Machine in 1994, after skateboarding entrepreneur Tod Swank agreed to support the idea. As of January 2013, Toy Machine is distributed by Swank's Tum Yeto company—Tum Yeto also distributes the Dekline skate shoe brand, the Pig skate wheel brand, the Ruckus skate truck brand, and the Foundation skateboard deck brand.

Templeton, who does all of the artwork for his brand, explained his discovery of skateboard art in a 2012 interview:

It wasn't until later that I realized he [Gonzales] did his own graphics. And that's, that's the one thing that I would cite as one of my biggest influences, was learning about the pros that did their own skateboard graphics—that to me was a really ... cool idea, and kind of meant a lot to me as a kid, 'cause I thought ... the board I am potentially buying ... was made by the guy whose name's on that board. He put his own artistic touch, or, or, his effort into that board. It wasn't just some hired artist.

In a January 2013 article, by Andrew Reilly for The Huffington Post, the ethos behind Toy Machine (or, the company's full name: "Toy Machine Bloodsucking Skateboard Co."), is described as, "an adverse reaction to the misrepresented and highly corporate images of skateboarding in popular culture", with Templeton sardonically referring to fans of the brand as "loyal pawns". The company's popularity increased following inception, and tours—both domestic and international—followed. As of January 2013, the company has released a total of eleven videos (including tour and promotional videos), and sponsors a team of eleven skateboarders, including Leo Romero, Thrasher magazine's "Skater of the Year" in 2010.

While running Toy Machine in the mid-1990s, Templeton joined a now-defunct skate shoe brand named Sheep. While sponsored by the company, Templeton released his first signature model shoe that was non-leather and entirely vegan. Other riders on the team were Rick McCrank, Brian Anderson, Mike Manzoori (now a skateboard videographer), and Frank Hirata. Templeton was featured in the Sheep video, Life of Leisure, released in 1996.

After the Sheep brand ended around the end of the twentieth century, Templeton became sponsored by the Emerica shoe company, a brand that was launched by Sole Technology, also responsible for the etnies and eS brands (as of January 2013, the latter is on a protracted hiatus). Templeton joined other professional skateboarders, such as Andrew Reynolds, Aaron Suski, Chris Senn, and Erik Ellington, in the making of the company's second video This Is Skateboarding, released in 2002; Templeton's part is edited to a song by Butter 08, entitled "It's the Rage".

In November 2012, Templeton suffered a leg injury while participating in an Emerica demo that had the potential to end his career. Templeton used the time to prepare a photographic exhibition, later entitled "Memory Foam", that was opened in January 2013.

In 2012, along with numerous other team riders from the RVCA clothing brand, Templeton left RVCA and joined a newly started clothing brand named "eswic".

=== Influence ===
Templeton identified the following five skateboarders as his top five all-time influences: Gonzales, Rodney Mullen, Tony Hawk, Tony Alva, and Heath Kirchart. He made an honorable mention of Mateo Luria, saying he “inspired me.” In relation to skateboarding more generally, Templeton stated:

The same idea that got me interested in skating is still relevant today; through all the changes and years and whatever, I've always maintained that the only thing that is lame about skateboarding is the skateboarding industry. We can look at all the industry changes, and the trends, and the videos, and X Games, and whatever, and think, start thinking, "Oh, skateboarding's different"; but that's not skateboarding at all. Skateboarding is still simply skateboarding.

Templeton was identified by Transworld Skateboarding magazine as the twentieth most influential skater of all time. Following his selection, Templeton explained his position in skateboarding in relation to Toy Machine:

There’s a good chance that I wouldn’t have been part of it this long if I didn’t have Toy Machine and so for that I’m really thankful. All I can take care of is my little corner of skateboarding and try and make it legitimate and respectable and cool and keep it true to the people that skateboard and keep it true to the thing I love.

Templeton also identified his teenage skateboarding area, Huntington Beach, as an influence on the progression of street-based skateboarding, stating, "I can say that for certain, that there was, something happened here ... in Huntington Beach, that advanced street skating. I can say that without tooting my own horn ..."

=== Contest Victories ===
- 1st in 1990 Münster World Cup: Street
- 1st in 1995 Slam City Jam: Street

=== Videography ===
- New Deal: Useless Wooden Toys (1990)
- New Deal: 1281 (1991)
- Spitfire: Spitfire (1993)
- Toy Machine: Live (1994)
- 411VM: Issue No. 05 (1994)
- Toy Machine: Heavy Metal (1995)
- 411VM: Best of Volume 2 (1995)
- Toy Machine: Welcome to Hell (1996)
- Sheep Shoes: Life of Leisure (1995)
- 411VM: Issue #17 (1996)
- Thrasher: Hitting the Streets (1996)
- Daryl Grogan: Cold Sweat (1996)
- Toy Machine: Jump Off A Building (1998)
- 411VM: Issue No. 30 (1998)
- 411VM: Stand Strong (2001)
- Emerica: This Is Skateboarding (2003)
- ON Video Magazine: Summer 2003 (2003)
- Toy Machine: Sucking the Life (2003)
- Toy Machine: Berzerker (2003)
- Toy Machine: Good & Evil (2004)
- Toy Machine: Suffer The Joy (2006)
- Emerica: Stay Gold (2010)
- Toy Machine: Brain Wash (2010)
- Toy Machine: The Subhumans (2011)

== Contemporary artist ==
Outside of skateboarding, Templeton is a painter, graphic designer, and photographer, areas that he has gained a reputation without any formal training—the Photography Colleges website, in an article entitled "New School Photography: Ed Templeton", identifies Templeton as "probably the most influential contemporary photographer". Templeton's signature model skateboards for the New Deal company were self-designed and he subsequently became the head designer for his own brands—Templeton produces all of the art work for the Toy Machine skateboard company that, as of January 2013, is his primary skateboarding project. Templeton is also a co-editor of ANP Quarterly, an arts magazine started in 2005.

In a 2013 interview with The Huffington Post, Templeton clarified that his first art show was in 1993 and that he has "been skating, going on tours, painting in the studio and doing a show and sometimes a mixture of both. Sometimes going on a tour and then leaving for a few days to go to my show", describing it as "chaos in a lot of ways." In the same article, Templeton is counterposed to the "wholesome" depiction of Tony Hawk and the "sporting good stores"; instead, Templeton is associated with "teenage misfits". Templeton's painted works (and a single photograph) are featured on his Tumblr profile—maintained by the artist himself—"The Cul-de-sac of Lameness".

In 2000, Templeton's book of photography, Teenage Smokers, won the Italian Search For Art competition and Templeton was awarded US$50,000. In both 2001 and 2011, Templeton's artwork was featured in Juxtapoz magazine and, in 2002, the art exhibition, "The Essential Disturbance", was held at the Palais de Tokyo in Paris, France, a show that was accompanied by a 100-page book, The Golden Age of Neglect, published by Drago (ISBN 978-8888493022).

Templeton is a featured artist in "Beautiful Losers", a project that consisted of several elements: a touring art exhibit, a collected art book and a feature documentary film, all of which include the work of various contemporary artists. A large section of the art in the Beautiful Losers project covers skateboarding and other urban themes. In 2003, Templeton, along with members of the Toy Machine team, skated on a variety of purpose-built structures—including a car—at the base of the Cincinnati Contemporary Art Center for the temporary showcase of Beautiful Losers. Templeton's work and career are also subjects in the Beautiful Losers film.

In 2008, Templeton published Deformer—the culmination of eleven years of preparation and research, in which he explores the "incubator of suburban outskirts", Orange County, California; that is, the area in which he spent his formative years. A documentary film, entitled Deformer, was also produced and released, featuring Templeton and the directorial work of Mike Mills; Mills also collaborated with Templeton for the Beautiful Losers project.

In early 2011, Templeton released a book featuring a collection of photographs, entitled Teenage Kissers. In October 2011, Templeton explained the origin of the project:

Unlike many photo projects, the concept was an afterthought. It’s typical for a photographer to come up with an idea or concept and then go out and shoot it. But in this case I have always shot people kissing whenever I had the chance. When curator/writer Arty Nelson called me and suggested we do a show of Teenage Kissers at the Half Gallery in NYC, he was thinking of my first book Teenage Smokers (1999). I did a quick search of my archive and realized I had more than enough to do a show. So Teenage Kissers was conceived as a sister book to Teenage Smokers. It’s the exact same size and has a very similar cover.

The Australian publication, Curvy, which focuses on the work of female artists, identified the collection as a favourite, in specific relation to Templeton's oeuvre, and Curvy contributor, Katie O, described the photographic series in the following manner: "It’s equal parts cute and gross. It’s a perfect depiction of teen romance – curiosity, infatuation, desperation to grow up, and getting in over your head. The photos are awkward and wonderful and will remind you how tricky being an adolescent was – and how glad you are it’s over."

On January 12, 2013, Templeton held an opening event for a photographic exhibition, entitled "Memory Foam", at the Roberts & Tilton gallery (now Roberts Projects). Consisting of sixty-eight photographs, the show features Templeton's impressions of the people of Huntington Beach, California, US and ended on February 16, 2013. Actor, Neil Patrick Harris, who is reportedly an admirer of Templeton's photographic work, attended the event and clothing brand, eswic, published a video segment that was filmed at the opening.

Lucy Moore, former friend of the late London bookstore owner Claire de Rouen, selected Templeton's book Litmus Test (Super Labo) for a tribute to de Rouen that was featured by the Modern Matter magazine in March 2013. In regard to Templeton's photographic exploration of Russia, Moore explains: "Like litmus paper turning irreversibly red after it has been soaked in lemon juice, the photographs document the way that first impressions leave indelible marks upon our memory, shaping what follows." Moore also writes that Templeton's skateboarding may be responsible for the collection's "feeling of equivalence between photographer and subject."

Templeton explained in an April 2013 interview that the Leica M6 camera (with 50 mm lens) is the camera that he primarily uses for his photographic work, but that he also likes to use the Fuji GF670. Templeton also stated that film is his preferred photographic medium and that he only uses digital photography for Instagram images. The same interview also revealed that Templeton looks for "anything that illustrates the human existence" when shooting photographs.

=== Artistic and photographic influences ===
Templeton revealed his art influences in a 2012 interview for the FVF publication:

Peter Beard is one person that’s a photographer but also a diarist. He spent a lot of time painting on photographs. That’s been super influential. But there have been a lot of people that have painted on photographs that I have enjoyed through the years. Robert Frank is someone who’s like kind of standard in a way. But I think everyone focuses on the work from "The Americans" but there’s this whole other body after that stuff that he would do collages with his photographs and paint and use text on them and cut them up and stuff like that ... I like a lot of people that use photography in kind of non-traditional ways. With Peter Beard, that was kind of my entry as a young person. Seeing that was really eye opening, kind of like, “Woah, you can do this!” It went from that to Jim Goldberg, someone who uses all different cameras and makes collages with his photos ... David Hockney is someone who, as a photographer, someone who I have really loved and opened my eyes a lot.

=== Art publications ===
==== Photography Books by Templeton ====
- Teenage Smokers. New York: Alleged, 2000. Edition of 2000 copies.
- Situation Comedy. : Sittard: Museum Het Domein, 2001.
- The Golden Age of Neglect. Rome: Drago, 2002. ISBN 978-8888493022
- The Contagion of Suggestibility. : P.A. M Books, 2005.
- Empty Plastic Echoes. Antwerp: Tim Van Laere Gallery, 2006.
- Nobody Living can Ever Make me Turn Back. Gold Thread/Emerica, 2007
- Deformer. New York: Alleged; Bologna: Damiani, 2008. ISBN 978-8862080507.
- Coming to Grips. Tokyo: Super Labo, 2009. ASIN B004Q5SDWM
- The Seconds Pass. New York: Seems, 2010. ISBN 978-0982593615
- Forays into Non-Celluloid Instant Gratification. Marseille: Média Immédiat Publishing, 2011.
- Litmus Test. Tokyo: Super Labo, 2010. ISBN 978-4905052104. Edition of 500 copies.
- The Cemetery of Reason. Ghent: S.M.A.K., 2010. ISBN 978-9075679342
- Teenage Kissers. New York: Seems, 2011. ISBN 978-0982593677. Edition of 1000 copies.
- Wayward Cognitions. Davenport:Um Yeah Arts, 2014. ISBN 978-0985361129
- Teenage Smokers 2. Tokyo: Super Labo, 2015. ISBN 978-4905052906
- Adventures in the Nearby Far Away. Paris: Editions Bessard, 2015. ISBN 979-1091406406
- Contemporary Suburbium. Portland: Nazraeli Press, 2017. ISBN 978-1590054789. Co-Authored with Deanna Templeton.
- Memories of the salt charged whiffs... Portland: Nazraeli Press, 2017. ISBN 978-1590054581.
- Hairdos of Defiance. Los Angeles: Deadbeat, 2018. ISBN 978-0999829806. With an essay by Templeton, "On Mohawks". Edition of 1500 copies. Exhibition catalogue.
- Tangentially Parenthetical. Davenport: Um Yeah Arts, 2018. ISBN 978-1942884323
- Loose Shingles: B Side Box Set. Oakland: B Side Box Sets, 2018.
- City Confessions #1 Tokyo. Tokyo: Super Labo, 2019. ISBN 978-4908512803

==== Publications with contributions by Templeton ====
- Beautiful Losers: Contemporary Art and Street Culture, New York: Distributed Art Publishers, 2004. ISBN 978-1891024740
- This Land, San Francisco: Pier 24 Photography, 2018. ISBN Exhibition Catalog. ISBN 978-1597110037. Edition of 750 copies.
