= Thomas Campbell (visual artist) =

American painter

Thomas Campbell (born c. 1969) is a California-based visual artist, filmmaker, sculptor and photographer whose work has appeared on the Ugly Casanova album Sharpen Your Teeth and in Juxtapoz Magazine's September 2006 issue.

Thomas grew up surfing and skating in southern California before moving to New York in the 1980s. In that setting he came to know and be associated with the artists that would go on to make up San Francisco's Mission School painters and the generation that would be at least loosely defined by the Beautiful Losers exhibition in 2004.

His first feature-length surf film, The Seedling, came out in 1999; his second release was a film called Sprout in 2004, and his third surf film is called The Present, released in 2009.
