= Becky Stark =

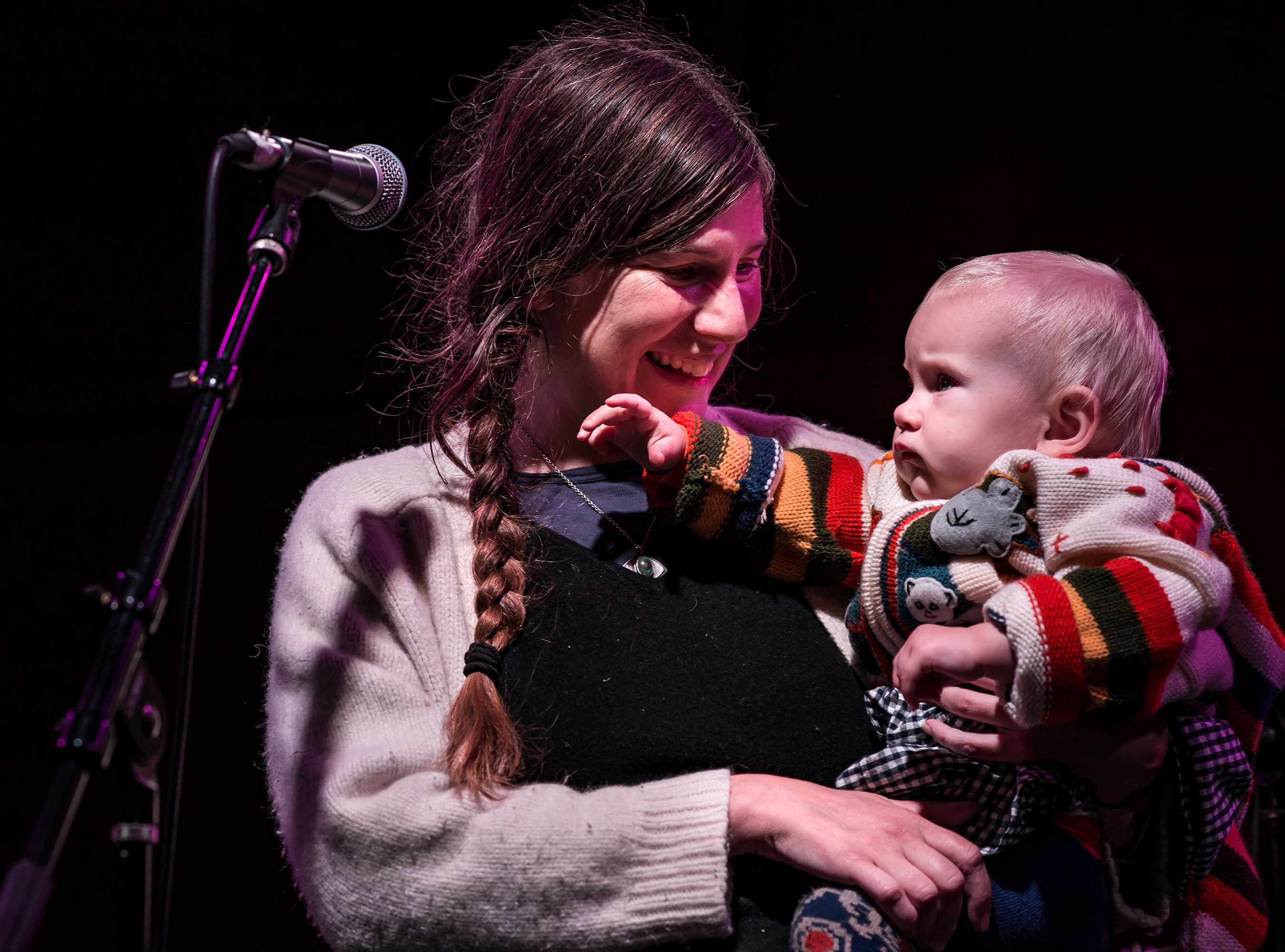

Background information
- Born: Rebecca Ann Stark; 1976 (age 49–50); Culver City, California, U.S.
- Origin: California, U.S.
- Genres: Indie rock, folk rock, folk, alternative rock
- Instrument: Vocals | Drums | Guitar | Tambourine
- Years active: 2004 - present (Lavender Diamond)
- Labels: Matador, Rough Trade, Cold Sweat

Becky Stark is an American artist, singer, songwriter and entertainer from Los Angeles, California. She is the voice of the band Lavender Diamond.

== Career ==
Becky Stark has performed extensively as a solo artist and leader of the Lavender Diamond band.

She appeared in the November 2007 Vanity Fair "Folk Music Heroes" portfolio by Annie Leibovitz on the page between Joni Mitchell and Judy Collins. In addition to her work with Lavender Diamond she sings with The Living Sisters, a folk trio with Eleni Mandell and Inara George from the Bird and the Bee.

The 2007 Lavender Diamond album Imagine Our Love was released on Matador and Rough Trade Records. A film to accompany the album is currently in production in IMAX format.

In 2008 she wrote the "Songs of the Believers" for the film City of Ember starring Bill Murray, directed by Gil Kenan and produced by Tom Hanks. The film is a post-apocalyptic action-adventure story for children. In the film Becky plays the Songmaster. She also stars in an upcoming short film version of a short story from Miranda July's book No one Belongs Here More Than You. Based on the story "Birthmark", the short is called "White Light".

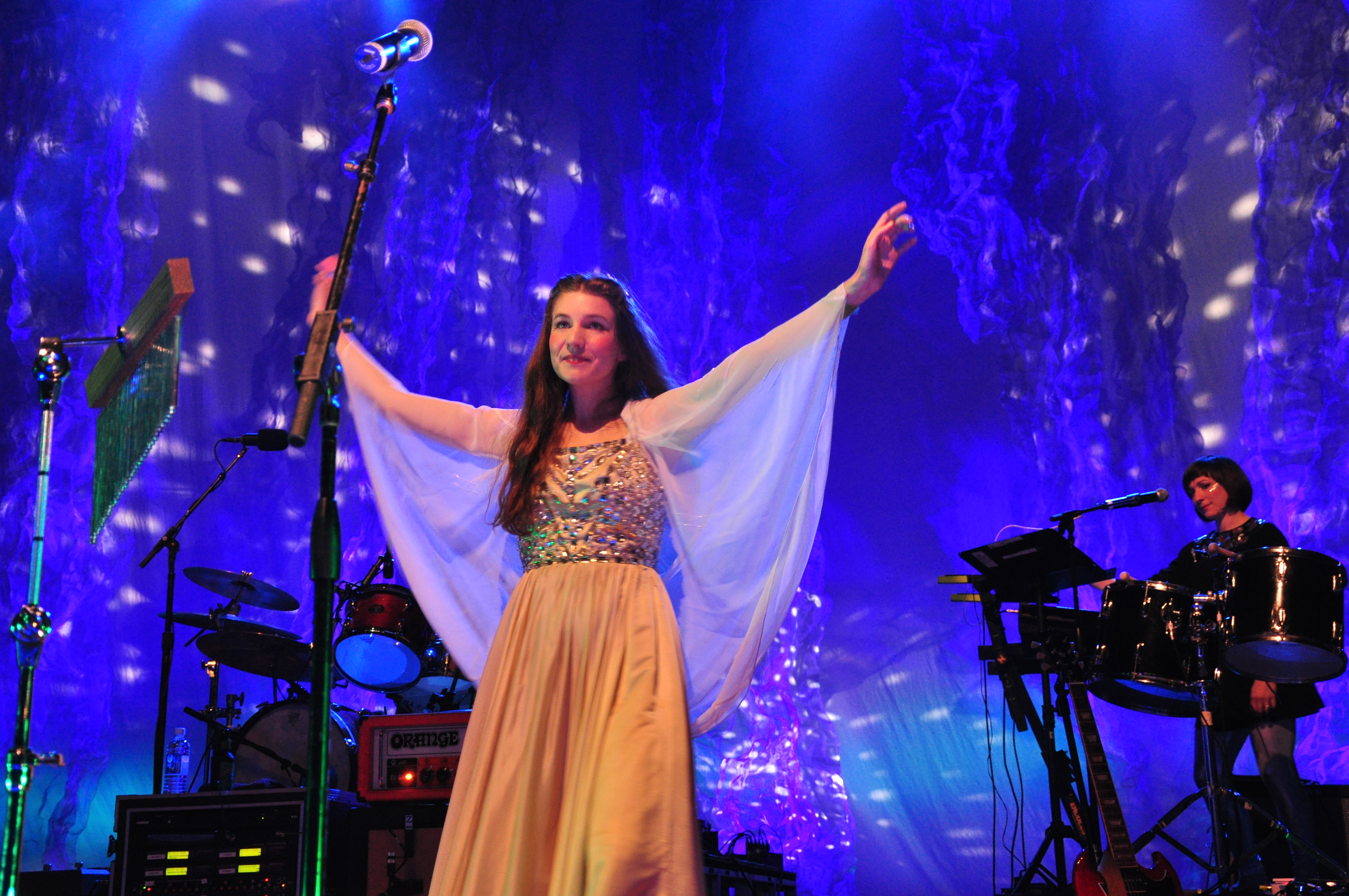
Stark in 2009 concert with The Decemberists

Stark appeared onstage as the musical guest in The Daily Show creator Ben Karlin's new variety show, singing with Zooey Deschanel and accompanied by OK Go. In 2009 she wrote, directed and appeared in the web series Califunya!

She appears as a character/vocalist on the Decemberists' 2009 concept album The Hazards of Love. She sings as the character Margaret and sings on the tracks "Won't Want for Love (Margaret in the Taiga)","Isn't It a Lovely Night?", "The Abduction of Margaret", and "The Hazards of Love 4 (The Drowned)." She appeared with her band at the 2009 South by Southwest festival.

== See also ==
- Folk rock
- Rough Trade
- Alternative rock
