= List of Guggenheim Fellowships awarded in 2024 =

List of Guggenheim Fellowships awarded in 2024:

| Fellow | Category | Field of Study |
|---|---|---|
| Wale Adebanwi | Humanities | African Studies |
| Heather Cass White | Humanities | American Literature |
| Carl Knappett | Social Sciences | Anthropology & Cultural Studies |
| Laura A. Ogden | Social Sciences | Anthropology & Cultural Studies |
| Douglas Rogers | Social Sciences | Anthropology & Cultural Studies |
| Deborah A. Thomas | Social Sciences | Anthropology & Cultural Studies |
| Paul Newton | Natural Sciences | Applied Mathematics |
| Paul Hardin Kapp | Humanities | Architecture, Planning, & Design |
| Marc Kamionkowski | Natural Sciences | Astronomy–Astrophysics |
| Nicholas Frankel | Creative Arts | Biography |
| Alison M. Bell | Natural Sciences | Biology |
| Robert M. Pringle | Natural Sciences | Biology |
| Corina E. Tarnita | Natural Sciences | Biology |
| Chad A. Mirkin | Natural Sciences | Chemistry |
| Teri W. Odom | Natural Sciences | Chemistry |
| Rosie Herrera | Creative Arts | Choreography |
| Ryan K. Johnson | Creative Arts | Choreography |
| Hari Krishnan | Creative Arts | Choreography |
| Rebecca Lazier | Creative Arts | Choreography |
| Victor Quijada | Creative Arts | Choreography |
| amara tabor-smith | Creative Arts | Choreography |
| Abby Zbikowski | Creative Arts | Choreography |
| Gretchen Reydams-Schils | Humanities | Classics |
| Andrew M. Riggsby | Humanities | Classics |
| Gene Tsudik | Natural Sciences | Computer Science |
| Kim Lane Scheppele | Social Sciences | Constitutional Studies |
| Emily Wilcox | Creative Arts | Dance Studies |
| Martin J. Wainwright | Natural Sciences | Data Science |
| Joshua Harmon | Creative Arts | Drama & Performance Art |
| Modesto Jimenez | Creative Arts | Drama & Performance Art |
| Martyna Majok | Creative Arts | Drama & Performance Art |
| James Scruggs | Creative Arts | Drama & Performance Art |
| Caridad Svich | Creative Arts | Drama & Performance Art |
| Eric Steig | Natural Sciences | Earth Science |
| Anna M. Shields | Humanities | East Asian Studies |
| Carola Suárez-Orozco | Social Sciences | Education |
| Vivek Goyal | Natural Sciences | Engineering |
| Petia Vlahovska | Natural Sciences | Engineering |
| John Connelly | Humanities | European & Latin American History |
| Martin Nesvig | Humanities | European & Latin American History |
| Martin Munro | Humanities | European & Latin American Literature |
| Camille Bordas | Creative Arts | Fiction |
| Jamel Brinkley | Creative Arts | Fiction |
| Emma Cline | Creative Arts | Fiction |
| Laird Hunt | Creative Arts | Fiction |
| Julia Phillips | Creative Arts | Fiction |
| Kirstin Valdez Quade | Creative Arts | Fiction |
| Emma Straub | Creative Arts | Fiction |
| Justin Torres | Creative Arts | Fiction |
| Itziar Barrio | Creative Arts | Film-Video |
| Jessica Beshir | Creative Arts | Film-Video |
| Garrett Bradley | Creative Arts | Film-Video |
| Lilli Carré | Creative Arts | Film-Video |
| Jude Chehab | Creative Arts | Film-Video |
| Ariana Gerstein | Creative Arts | Film-Video |
| Juan Pablo González | Creative Arts | Film-Video |
| Ben Hagari | Creative Arts | Film-Video |
| Shadi Harouni | Creative Arts | Film-Video |
| Baba Hillman | Creative Arts | Film-Video |
| Crystal Kayiza | Creative Arts | Film-Video |
| Won Ju Lim | Creative Arts | Film-Video |
| Loira Limbal | Creative Arts | Film-Video |
| Raúl O. Paz-Pastrana | Creative Arts | Film-Video |
| Jennifer Redfearn | Creative Arts | Film-Video |
| Shengze Zhu | Creative Arts | Film-Video |
| Jonathan Sterne | Creative Arts | Film, Video, & New Media Studies |
| Sónia Almeida | Creative Arts | Fine Arts |
| Kim Anno | Creative Arts | Fine Arts |
| Jessica Elaine Blinkhorn | Creative Arts | Fine Arts |
| Rebeca Bollinger | Creative Arts | Fine Arts |
| Ben Thorp Brown | Creative Arts | Fine Arts |
| Mike Cloud | Creative Arts | Fine Arts |
| Lewis deSoto | Creative Arts | Fine Arts |
| Adama Delphine Fawundu | Creative Arts | Fine Arts |
| Nicholas Galanin | Creative Arts | Fine Arts |
| Guillermo Galindo | Creative Arts | Fine Arts |
| Antonietta Grassi | Creative Arts | Fine Arts |
| Léonie Guyer | Creative Arts | Fine Arts |
| Bang Geul Han | Creative Arts | Fine Arts |
| Lotus L. Kang | Creative Arts | Fine Arts |
| Nicola López | Creative Arts | Fine Arts |
| Park McArthur | Creative Arts | Fine Arts |
| Harold Mendez | Creative Arts | Fine Arts |
| Taji Ra’oof Nahl | Creative Arts | Fine Arts |
| Lorraine O’Grady | Creative Arts | Fine Arts |
| Lamar Peterson | Creative Arts | Fine Arts |
| Anders Ruhwald | Creative Arts | Fine Arts |
| Carrie Schneider | Creative Arts | Fine Arts |
| Jennifer Sirey | Creative Arts | Fine Arts |
| Arvie Smith | Creative Arts | Fine Arts |
| jackie sumell | Creative Arts | Fine Arts |
| Dyani White Hawk | Creative Arts | Fine Arts |
| Susan York | Creative Arts | Fine Arts |
| Claire Bishop | Humanities | Fine Arts Research |
| Laura U. Marks | Humanities | Fine Arts Research |
| Alexander Nagel | Humanities | Fine Arts Research |
| Amara Solari | Humanities | Fine Arts Research |
| Krista Thompson | Humanities | Fine Arts Research |
| Jonathan Alter | Creative Arts | General Nonfiction |
| Thomas Beller | Creative Arts | General Nonfiction |
| Jefferson Cowie | Creative Arts | General Nonfiction |
| David Mura | Creative Arts | General Nonfiction |
| Beth Nguyen | Creative Arts | General Nonfiction |
| Jennifer Raff | Creative Arts | General Nonfiction |
| Sonia Shah | Creative Arts | General Nonfiction |
| Christina Sharpe | Creative Arts | General Nonfiction |
| Adam Shatz | Creative Arts | General Nonfiction |
| James Wood | Creative Arts | General Nonfiction |
| Robert Kopp | Natural Sciences | Geography & Environmental Studies |
| Emily T. Yeh | Natural Sciences | Geography & Environmental Studies |
| Angela N. H. Creager | Humanities | History of Science, Technology, & Economics |
| Dániel Margócsy | Humanities | History of Science, Technology, & Economics |
| Matthew Pratt Guterl | Humanities | Intellectual & Cultural History |
| Vincent W. Lloyd | Humanities | Intellectual & Cultural History |
| Tiya Miles | Humanities | Intellectual & Cultural History |
| Thomas M. Keck | Social Sciences | Law |
| Joseph F. Eska | Humanities | Linguistics |
| Bruno Bosteels | Humanities | Literary Criticism |
| Marta Figlerowicz | Humanities | Literary Criticism |
| Sianne Ngai | Humanities | Literary Criticism |
| Roy Scranton | Humanities | Literary Criticism |
| Henri Darmon | Natural Sciences | Mathematics |
| Cassandra Quave | Natural Sciences | Medicine & Health |
| Brian A. Catlos | Humanities | Medieval & Early Modern Studies |
| Utku Asuroglu | Creative Arts | Music Composition |
| Nicolás Lell Benavides | Creative Arts | Music Composition |
| Kui Dong | Creative Arts | Music Composition |
| Kate Gentile | Creative Arts | Music Composition |
| Rodney Jones | Creative Arts | Music Composition |
| Yoon-Ji Lee | Creative Arts | Music Composition |
| Aruán Ortiz | Creative Arts | Music Composition |
| Luis Quintana | Creative Arts | Music Composition |
| Nicole Rampersaud | Creative Arts | Music Composition |
| Bekah Simms | Creative Arts | Music Composition |
| Anthony Tidd | Creative Arts | Music Composition |
| Julia Wolfe | Creative Arts | Music Composition |
| Theresa Wong | Creative Arts | Music Composition |
| Xi Wang | Creative Arts | Music Composition |
| Nina Kraus | Humanities | Music Research |
| Amy Lynn Wlodarski | Humanities | Music Research |
| Roger Philip Levy | Natural Sciences | Neuroscience |
| Jenann Ismael | Humanities | Philosophy |
| Barbara Montero | Humanities | Philosophy |
| Sara Bennett | Creative Arts | Photography |
| Matthew Brandt | Creative Arts | Photography |
| Carlos Diaz | Creative Arts | Photography |
| Joanne Dugan | Creative Arts | Photography |
| Lisa Elmaleh | Creative Arts | Photography |
| Lucas Foglia | Creative Arts | Photography |
| Dylan Hausthor | Creative Arts | Photography |
| Katherine Hubbard | Creative Arts | Photography |
| Tarrah Krajnak | Creative Arts | Photography |
| Rachelle Mozman Solano | Creative Arts | Photography |
| Gina Osterloh | Creative Arts | Photography |
| Arthur Ou | Creative Arts | Photography |
| Ahndraya Parlato | Creative Arts | Photography |
| Greta Pratt | Creative Arts | Photography |
| Margaret Stratton | Creative Arts | Photography |
| Leonard Suryajaya | Creative Arts | Photography |
| Ada Trillo | Creative Arts | Photography |
| Tracy R. Slatyer | Natural Sciences | Physics |
| Kaveh Akbar | Creative Arts | Poetry |
| Jos Charles | Creative Arts | Poetry |
| Elaine Equi | Creative Arts | Poetry |
| Vievee Francis | Creative Arts | Poetry |
| Airea D. Matthews | Creative Arts | Poetry |
| Robyn Schiff | Creative Arts | Poetry |
| Safiya Sinclair | Creative Arts | Poetry |
| Tracy K. Smith | Creative Arts | Poetry |
| Mai Der Vang | Creative Arts | Poetry |
| Kosuke Imai | Social Sciences | Political Science |
| Jan-Werner Müller | Social Sciences | Political Science |
| Jessica Pisano | Social Sciences | Political Science |
| Mara Benjamin | Humanities | Religion |
| Carol E. Harrison | Humanities | Religion |
| Travis Zadeh | Humanities | Religion |
| Jennifer Ackerman | Natural Sciences | Science Writing |
| Ed Yong | Natural Sciences | Science Writing |
| Feng Wang | Social Sciences | Sociology |
| Nita Kumar | Humanities | South & Southeast Asian Studies |
| Jonathan A. Silk | Humanities | South & Southeast Asian Studies |
| Jack Halberstam | Humanities | Theatre Arts & Performance Studies |
| Tavia Nyong’o | Humanities | Theatre Arts & Performance Studies |
| Ryan Bloom | Humanities | Translation |
| Ned Blackhawk | Humanities | U.S. History |
| Elizabeth Hinton | Humanities | U.S. History |
| Christina Snyder | Humanities | U.S. History |
