= Elmaleh =

Elmaleh is a surname. Notable people with the surname include:

- Gad Elmaleh (born 1971), Moroccan standup comedian and actor
- Lisa Elmaleh (born 1984), American photographer
- Maxime Elmaleh (born 1969), Canadian curler
- Sarah Elmaleh, American voice actor
- Victor Elmaleh (1918–2014), Moroccan-American businessman and real estate developer
