= Robin Curtis (scholar) =

Canadian film & media scholar

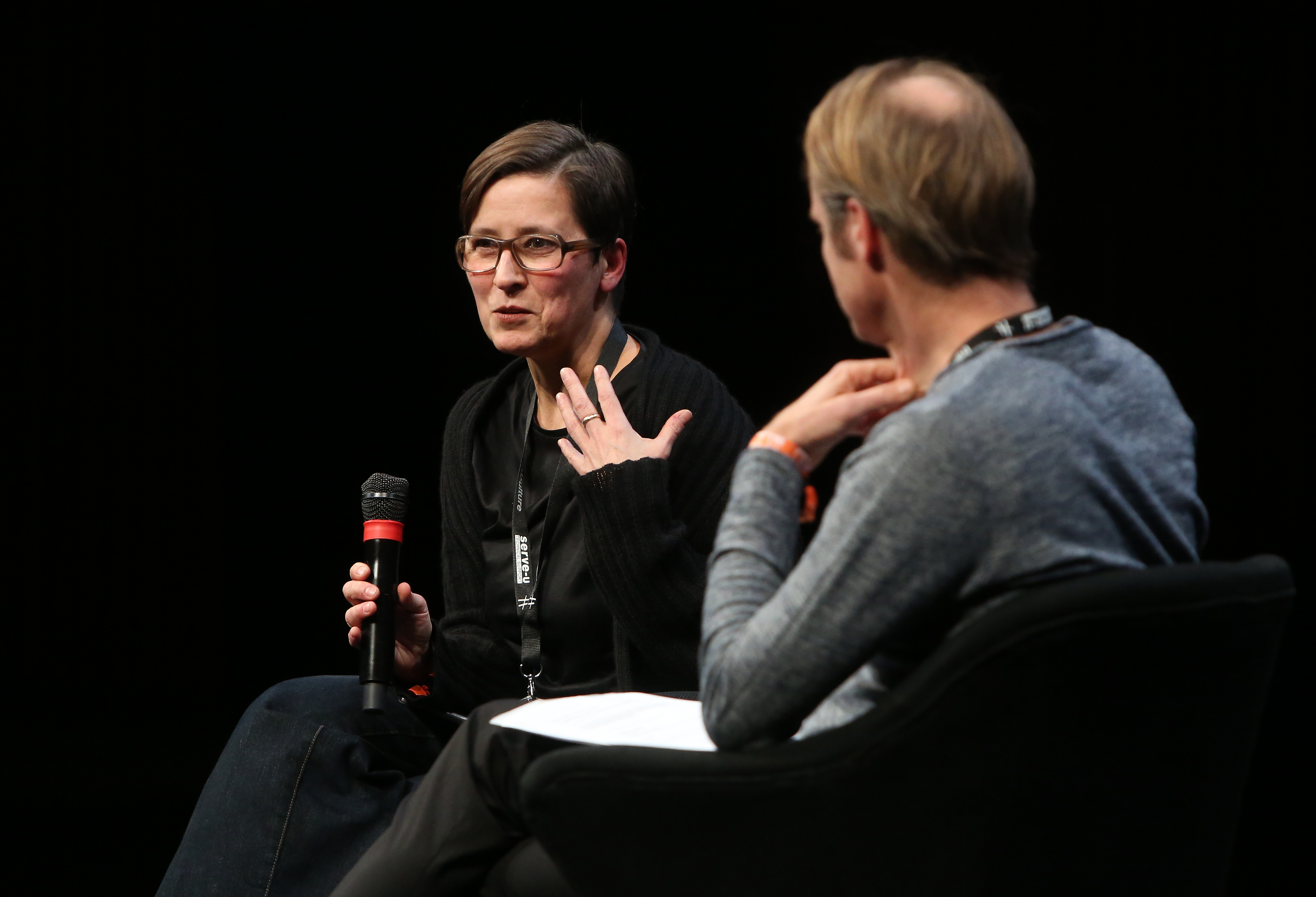
Curtis (left) in 2019

Robin Curtis is a Canadian film and media scholar and cultural critic who is based in Germany. She currently holds the chair in Media and Cultural Studies at the Heinrich-Heine-Universität Düsseldorf, where she also chairs the department of Media and Cultural Studies (Medien- und Kulturwissenschaft - which combines German Media studies with perspectives on humans, animals and things as well as culture, audiences, everyday life and aesthetic experience familiar from Cultural Studies and Film Studies).

Her writings have appeared in both German and English. In recent years she has contributed in particular to the development of the theory of immersion as well the link between empathy, empathy aesthetics (or Einfühlung) and the capacity of audio-visual media to destabilize the subject via atmospheric qualities or mimetic processes. Further contributions focus on the manner in which the audio-visual medium requires a distinct approach to autobiography and other forms of "reports" on or documents of the self and its situation within time and space.

She is a member of the editorial board of the journals Pop: Kultur und Kritik and Jahrbuch immersiver Medien.

Her work as an independent curator includes her collaboration in 2001 with Laura U. Marks commissioned by the International Short Film Festival Oberhausen entitled "Out of Time: Bodies of Temporality." In this section consisting of 19 90-minute-programmes, which included contributions by guest curators Jeremy Rigsby, Johan Grimonprez, Victor Masayesva Jr., Rick Prelinger and Herbert Schwarze, Patricia R. Zimmermann, Jan-Christopher Horak, Grahame Weinbren, and Paul D. Miller a.k.a. DJ Spooky that Subliminal Kid, Curtis and Marks took up the topic of temporal perception in the present. Curtis has also curated programmes for Arsenal: Institut für Film- und Videokunst e.V. in Berlin, for the Goethe Institut in Palestine and Israel. and was a member of the curatorial team for the 2002 Werkleitz Biennale on the topic of the capitalist logic of intercultural and sexual profit in the programmes entitled "Zugewinngemeinschaft." The Biennale's Website offers the following description of the topic: "Curated by a team of 12 artists and executives this years biennial is set to focus on the roots of apartheid as a broad-based and subtle phenomenon and to look at how separate identities are coined culturally, socially and politically, be it on the basis of colour, sex and class, or on the basis of education, wealth and profession. How do such factors define and reinforce the notion of ‘they’ on the one hand, and ‘we’ on the other? A confrontation with the architecture of divisiveness and its possible antidotes, even if these be utopian in nature, will be at the heart of the 5th Werkleitz Biennial. Its title “Zugewinngemeinschaft” – a term from German marital law – can, however, also be understood in a much more far-reaching sense: if it is applied to a society that in many regards defines itself through added value (or is focused on it) and tends to want to exclude any other obligations, other political circumstances come into view."

Her short film Nachlaß completed in 1992 and is distributed by Canadian Filmmakers Distribution Centre in Toronto and by Arsenal: Institut für Film- und Videokunst e.V. in Berlin.

== Biography ==
Robin Curtis was born in Toronto, Ontario, where she completed a double specialist Honours Bachelor of Arts at the University of Toronto in both Cinema Studies and German Languages and Literature in 1989. After having spent her third year on an independent study abroad in the Winter Semester 1986–87 at the Freie Universität Berlin, she moved to Berlin in 1989 where she completed a Magister Artium degree in 1996 in Theater Studies and North American Studies at the Freie Universität Berlin. Following the conferring of this degree she held a position as Wissenschaftliche Mitarbeiterin at the Media Studies Department of the Universität für Film und Fernsehen, Potsdam-Babelsberg (then known as the Hochschule für Film und Fernsehen "Konrad Wolf" Potsdam-Babelsberg) from 1997 to 2002. In the Spring of 2002 she took up a position as Research Fellow (Wissenschaftliche Mitarbeiterin) in the Collaborative Research Center (Sonderforschungsbereich 447 Kulturen des Performativen) "Cultures of Performativity" operated jointly by the Freie Universität Berlin and the Humboldt Universität Berlin.

In this context she completed her doctorate summa cum laude with the film and media scholar Gertrud Koch as her principal advisor in 2003 with a dissertation entitled Situating the Self: Visceral Experience and Anxiety in the German Non-Fictional Autobiographical Film. From 2008 to 2011 she was a Feodor-Lynen-Fellow of the Alexander von Humboldt Foundation. From 2012 to 2017 she was a W2 Professor of Theory and Practice of Audiovisual Media in the Media and Cultural Studies Department at the Heinrich-Heine-Universität Düsseldorf. From September 2017 to August 2021 she has held the chair in Media and Cultural Studies at the Albert-Ludwigs-Universität Freiburg. From 2021 she has held the chair in Media and Cultural Studies (W3 Lehrstuhlinhaberin) in the Media and Cultural Studies Department at the Heinrich-Heine-Universität Düsseldorf.

== Works ==
=== Books ===
==== Monographs ====
- Conscientious Viscerality: The Autobiographical Stance in German Film and Video. Berlin: Gebrüder Mann Verlag / Edition Imorde. 203 pages. 2006. ISBN 398094364X

==== Edited volumes and special issues ====
- The Autobiographical Turn in Germanophone Documentary and Autobiographical Film. Eds. Robin Curtis und Angelica Fenner. Rochester: Camden House Press, 2014. ISBN 9781571139177
- Synchronisierung der Künste. Eds. Robin Curtis, und Marc Siegel. München: Fink Verlag, 2013. ISBN 3770551028
- Synästhesie-Effekte: Zur Intermodalität der ästhetischen Wahrnehmung. Eds. Robin Curtis, Marc Glöde und Gertrud Koch. München: Fink Verlag, 2011. ISBN 3770545877
- Einfühlung: Zu Geschichte und Gegenwart eines ästhetischen Konzepts. Eds. Robin Curtis und Gertrud Koch. München: Fink Verlag, 2009. ISBN 3770545885
- An English translation of Einfühlung: Zu Geschichte und Gegenwart eines ästhetischen Konzepts appeared in Art in Translation Volume 6, Number 4, December 2014.
- Special Issue „Immersion,” montageAV. Eds. Robin Curtis and Christiane Voss. 17/2/2008.
- Deixis und Evidenz. Eds. Horst Wenzel and Ludwig Jäger with Robin Curtis and Christina Lechtermann. Freiburg: Rombach Verlag, 2008.
- Umwidmungen: architektonische und kinematografische Räume Ed. with Robin Curtis and Marc Glöde. Berlin: Vorwerk 8 Verlag, 2005. ISBN 3930916703
- Special Issue „Erinnern / Vergessen,” montageAV. Eds. Robin Curtis and Jörg Frieß, 11/1/2002.

=== Articles (recent selection) ===
- Klaus Sachs-Hombach, John Bateman, Robin Curtis, Beate Ochsner, Sebastian Thies. "Medienwissenschaftliche Multimodalitätsforschung" MEDIENwissenschaft 2018 01. pp. 8–26.
- Robin Curtis. „‘Being Boring‘ oder Medien der Muße" Pop: Kultur und Kritik 12 (Frühjahr 2018)]. 23–33. ISBN 3837638073
- Robin Curtis. „Der Tanz der Dinge: der Raum selbst bewegt sich, nähert sich, weicht zurück, dreht sich].“ Nachdemfilm Sondernummer zum Thema „Film | Tanz | Diskurs. Bewegungsbilder vom Tanzen im modernen Kino“ Hg. Sabine Nessel und Linda Waack. 16 (2017).
- Robin Curtis.„Das Vergessen, die Materie und das Selbst: Demenz im Dokumentarfilm” Alte im Film und auf der Bühne. Neue Altersbilder und Altersrollen in den darstellenden Künsten. Hg. Henriette Herwig und Andrea von Hülsen-Esch. Bielefeld: Transcript Verlag. 177-192
- Robin Curtis. „Autobiographical Film as Immersive Performance”. Sich selbst aufs Spiel setzen. Spiel als Technik und Medium der Subjektivierung Hg. Christian Moser und Regine Strätling. München: Wilhelm Fink Verlag. 2016 289-306.
- Robin Curtis. „Objects Arrested in Time and Space: Abstraction and Affect“. The Cine-Files: A Scholarly Journal of Cinema Studies. Issue 10: Special Issue on Cinematic Affect, Hg. Anne Rutherford. 2016.
- Robin Curtis.„Immersion and Abstraction“. Immersion in the Visual Arts and Media. Hg. Burcu Dogramaci und Fabi-enne Liptay. Amsterdam: Rodopi Verlag. 41-64.
- Robin Curtis. „Historical Reenactments und historisch spezifische Strategien der Verortung in der Geschichte“. Prinzip Wiederholung. Zur Ästhetik von System- und Sinnbildung in Literatur, Kunst und Kultur aus interdisziplinärer Sicht. Hg. Karoly Csuri und Joachim Jacob. Bielefeld: Aisthesis Verlag. 167-177.
- Robin Curtis. “Erstarrung, die Pose und das Altern” Pop: Kultur und Kritik 6 (Frühjahr 2015). 78-82. ISBN 3837638073

== Interviews and press ==
- Marissa Müller. "Selfiewahn und Likegeilheit: Wieso wir uns in sozialen Medien inszenieren." Fudder.de
- Where are they now? – Profiling Robin Curtis
- Heidi Ossenberg. Festivals schaffen Zugang für Filme aus aller Welt Badische Zeitung

== Scholarship ==
- Robin Curtis in the Databank of significant German female scholars, AcademiaNet
- Robin Curtis in the German Research Council Database

== Curating ==
5. Werkleitz Biennale 2002 "Zugewinngemeinschaft" 31.7. bis 4.8.2002 künstlerische Leitung: Holger Kube Ventura, kuratiert von: Jochen Becker, Reinhild Benning, Robin Curtis, Micz Flor, Stephan Geene, Merle Kröger, Brigitta Kuster, Renate Lorenz, Philip Scheffner, Dierk Schmidt, Stefanie Sembill, Gerhard Wissner.

== Filmmaking ==
Inclusion of Nachlass in Maria Eichhorn's 23 Films/23 Posters Show
