= De Young Museum =

Art museum in San Francisco, California, U.S.

M. H. de Young Memorial Museum
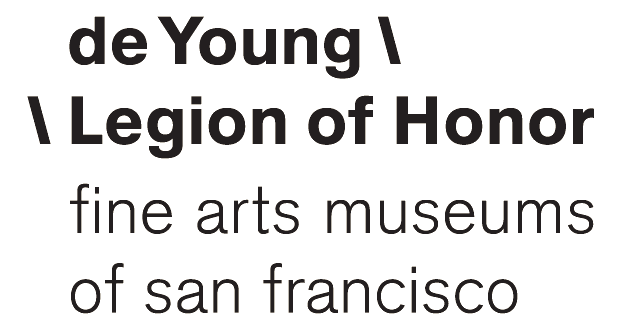

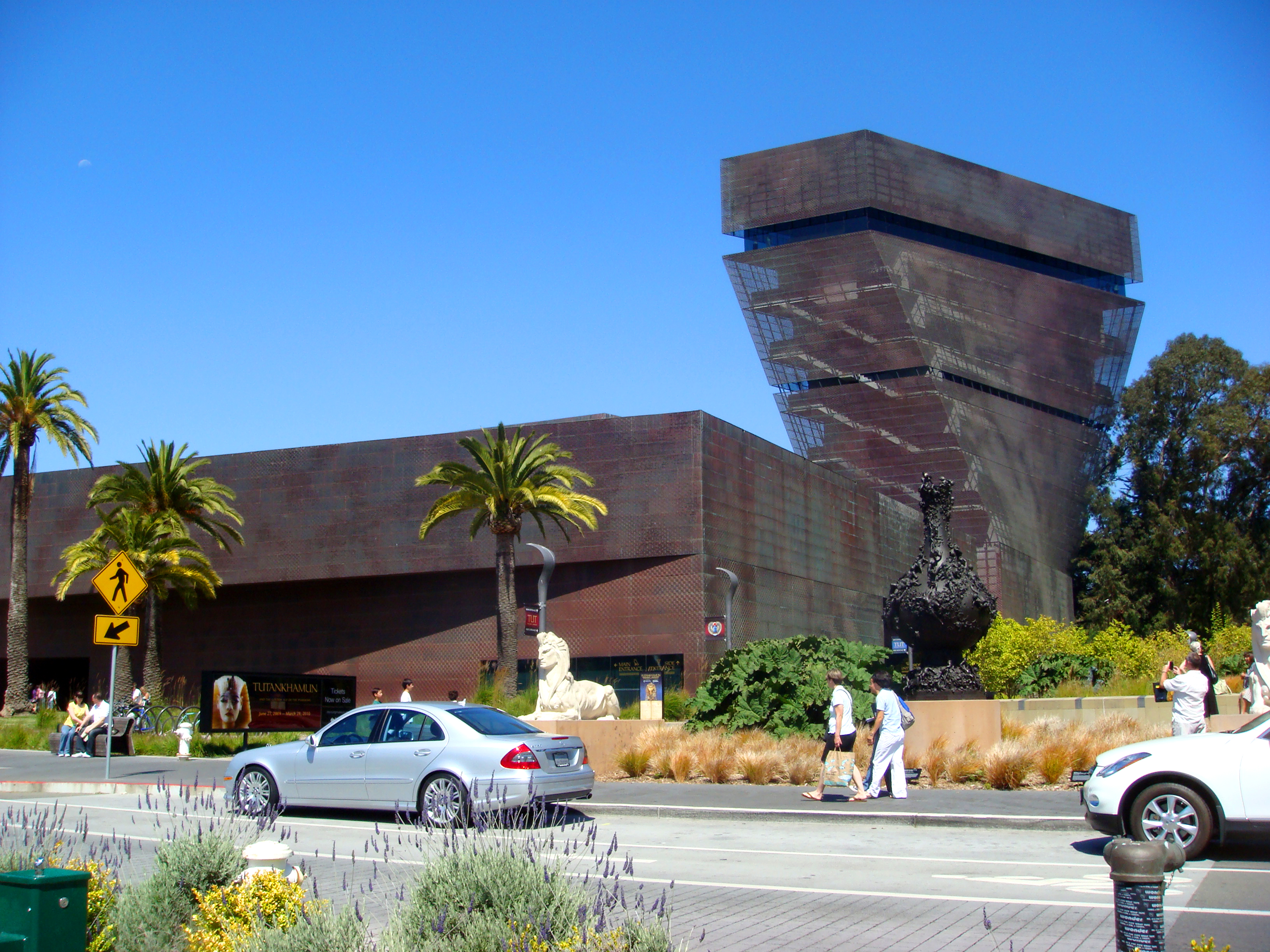
- Interactive fullscreen map
- Established: March 23, 1895
- Location: 50 Hagiwara Tea Garden Drive, San Francisco, California, United States
- Coordinates: 37°46′17″N 122°28′07″W
- Type: Art museum, ethnographic museum
- Visitors: 999,645 (2023)
- Director: Thomas P. Campbell
- Public transit access: 9th and Irving; Bus: 28, 28R, 44, 5R
- Website: www.famsf.org

The de Young Museum, formally the M. H. de Young Memorial Museum, is a fine arts museum located in San Francisco, California, United States, named for early San Francisco newspaperman M. H. de Young. Located on the West Side of the city in Golden Gate Park, it is a component of the Fine Arts Museums of San Francisco, along with the Legion of Honor.

The museum received 999,645 visitors in 2023, ranking as the 22nd most-visited museum in the United States, and the 82nd most-visited art museum in the world. In 2024, the two combined museums were ranked 15th in The Washington Post's list of the best art museums in the U.S.

== History ==
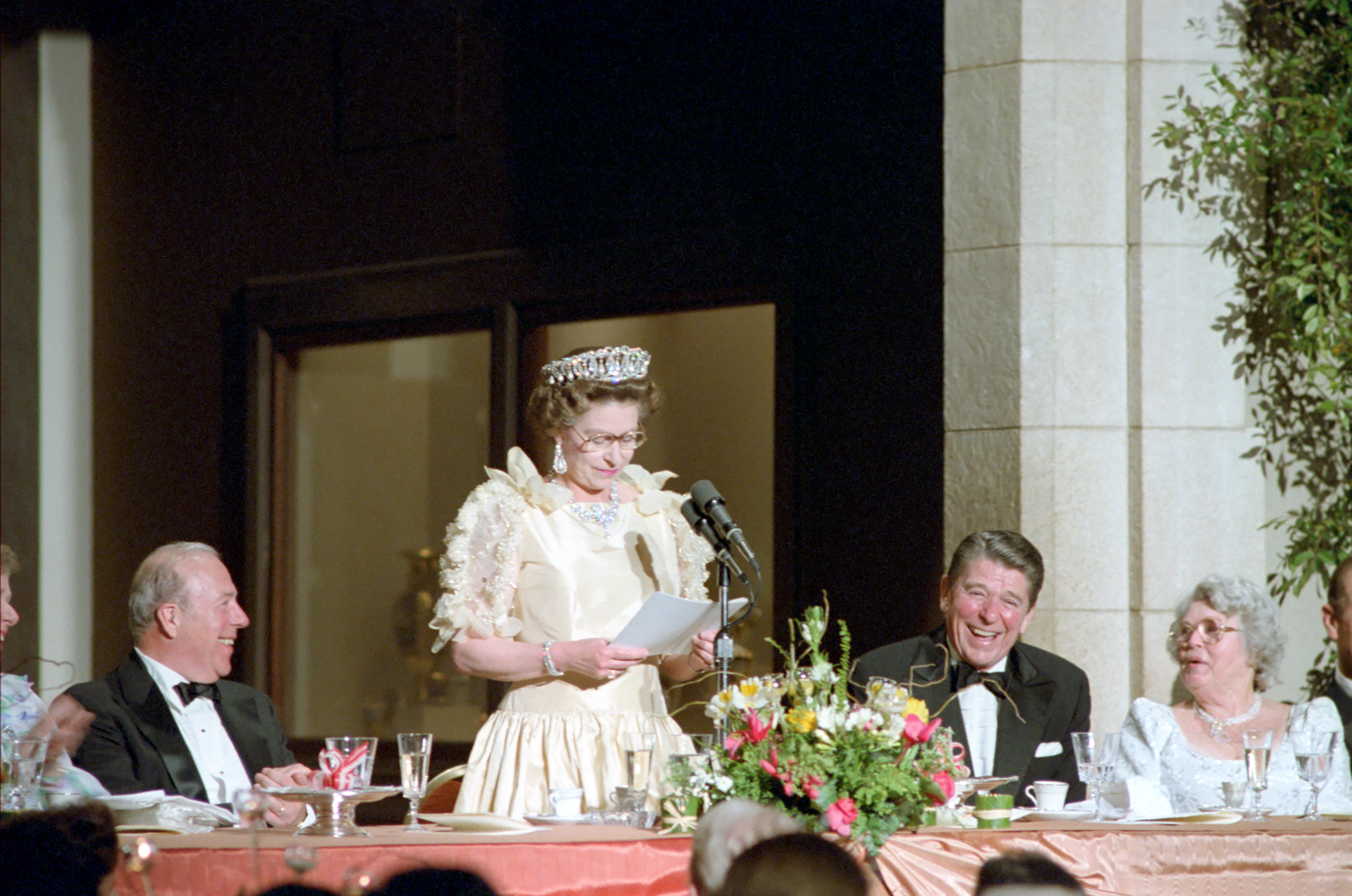
Elizabeth II speaking at the de Young Museum in 1983

The museum opened in 1895 in one of the buildings originally constructed for the California Midwinter International Exposition of 1894 (a fair modeled on the Chicago World's Columbian Exposition of the previous year). It was housed in an Egyptian Revival architecture structure which had been the Fine Arts Building at the fair. The building was badly damaged in the 1906 San Francisco earthquake, and was closed for a year and a half for repairs, reopening in November 1907.

Before long, the museum's steady development called for a new space to better serve its growing audiences. M. H. de Young responded by planning the building that would serve as the core of the de Young facility through the 20th century. Louis Christian Mullgardt, the coordinator for architecture for the Panama–Pacific International Exposition, designed the Spanish-Plateresque-style building. The new structure was completed in 1919 and formally transferred by de Young to the city's park commissioners. In 1921, de Young added a central section, together with a tower that would become the museum's signature feature, and the museum began to assume the basic configuration that it retained until 2000. De Young's efforts were honored with the changing of the museum's name to the M. H. de Young Memorial Museum. Another addition, a west wing, was completed in 1925, the year de Young died. In 1929 the original Egyptian-style building was declared unsafe and demolished.

By 1949, the elaborate cast concrete ornamentation of the original de Young was determined to be a hazard and removed because the salt air from the Pacific Ocean had rusted the supporting steel.

The building was severely damaged by the 1989 Loma Prieta earthquake. When the structure was demolished and replaced by a new building, which opened in 2005, the only remaining original elements of the old de Young were the vases and sphinxes located near the Pool of Enchantment. The palm trees in front of the building are also original to the site.

== Collections ==
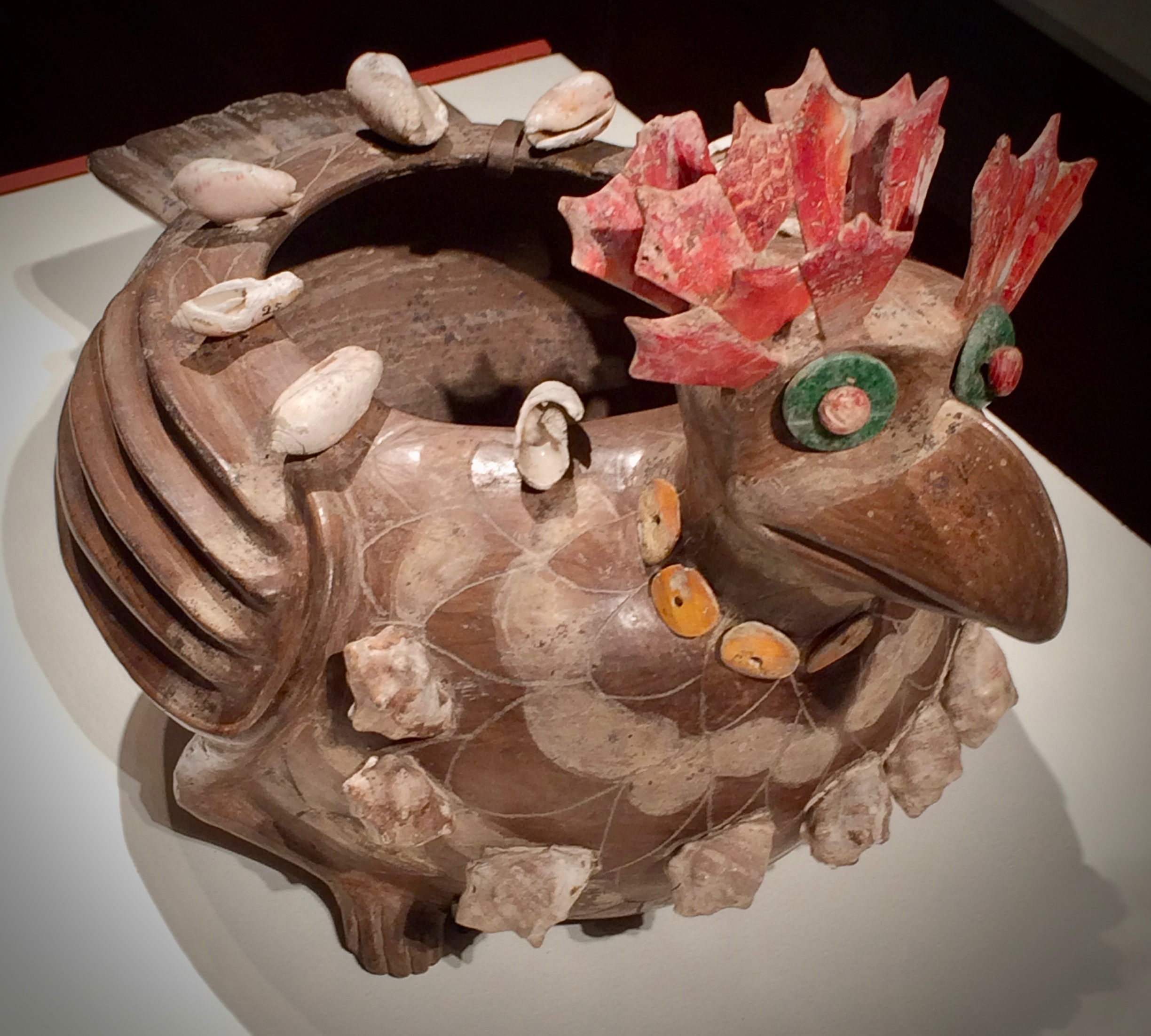
"Cover Pot" for the Teotihuacan show, 2017–18. Avian effigy, 250 – 350 AD

As part of the agreement that created the Fine Arts Museums of San Francisco in 1972, the de Young's collection of European art was sent to the Legion of Honor. In compensation, the de Young received the right to display the bulk of the organization's anthropological holdings. These include significant pre-Hispanic works from Teotihuacan and Peru, as well as indigenous tribal art from sub-Saharan Africa.

The de Young showcases American art from the 17th through the 21st centuries, international contemporary art, textiles, and costumes, and art from the Americas, Oceania, and Africa. Collections on view at the de Young Museum include African art, American art, Ancient art, Arts of the Americas, Contemporary art, Costume + Textile arts, European decorative arts, European paintings, European sculpture, Oceanic art, Photography, and Works on paper. Some of the collection is accessible online on the museum website and Google Arts & Culture.

=== American ===
The American art collection consists of over 5,000 objects including 1,000 paintings, 800 sculptures, and 3,000 decorative arts objects. It includes works ranging from 1670 to the present day.

In 1978, the American art collections were transformed by the decision of John D. Rockefeller III and Blanchette Ferry Rockefeller to donate their renowned collection of 110 paintings, 29 drawings, and 2 sculptures to the Fine Arts Museums of San Francisco.

The de Young's chronological survey of American art includes galleries devoted to art in the following areas: Native American and Spanish Colonial; Anglo-Colonial; Federal era art and Neoclassical; Victorian genre and realism; trompe-l'œil still life; the Hudson River School, Barbizon, and Tonalism; Impressionism and the Ashcan School; Arts and Crafts; Modernism; Social realism and American Scene; Surrealism and Abstraction; Beat, Pop, and Figurative; and Contemporary.

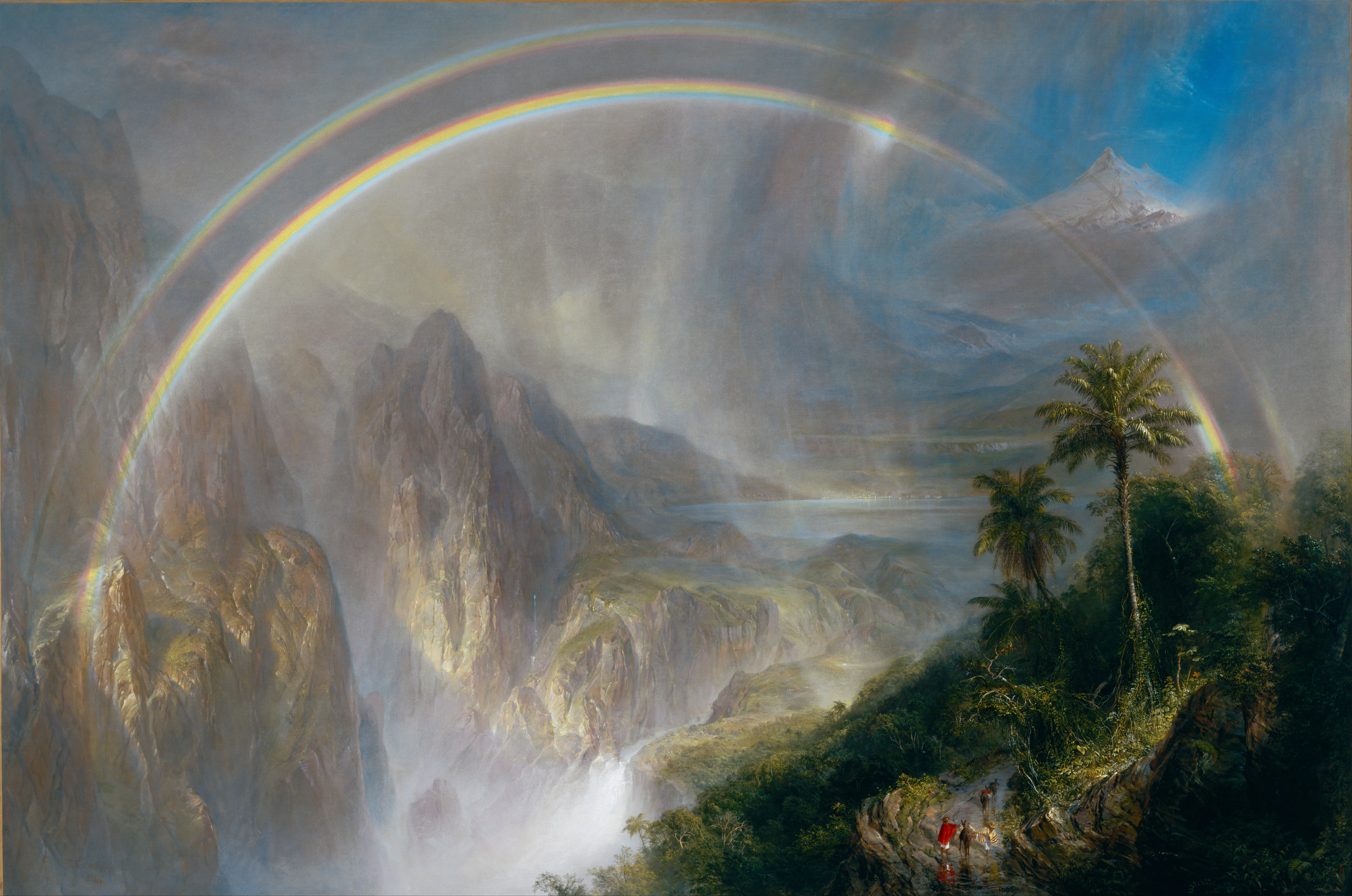
Rainy Season in the Tropics by Frederic Edwin Church (1866)

Although the permanent collection is national in scope, art made in California from the gold rush era to the present day is also on display in the de Young. Important California collections with national significance include examples of Spanish colonial, Arts and Crafts, and Bay Area Figurative and Assemblage. Important among them are the most significant museum collections of works by Bay Area painter Chiura Obata and sculptor Ruth Asawa.

The permanent collection galleries integrate decorative arts objects with paintings and sculptures, emphasizing the artistic, social, and political context for the works on display. While essentially chronological, the installation also juxtaposes works from different cultures and time periods to emphasize the historical connections between works in the collection. Painters with paintings in this museum include Thomas Hart Benton (Susannah and the Elders), Samuel Marsden Brookes, Mary Cassatt, Elizabeth Catlett, Thomas Cole (Prometheus Bound), John Singleton Copley, Richard Diebenkorn, Maynard Dixon, Childe Hassam, Thomas Hill, George Hitchcock, Beth Lipman, Louise Nevelson, Georgia O'Keeffe, Otis Oldfield, Mary Lovelace O'Neal, David Park, John F. Peto, Mel Ramos, Granville Redmond, Betye Saar, Kiki Smith, Pat Steir, Edmund C. Tarbell (The Blue Veil), Wayne Thiebaud, John Vanderlyn, and Thomas Waterman Wood (Newspaper Vendor).

In January 2017, the institution announced a significant new addition to its collection of American Art through the acquisition of 62 works by 22 contemporary African American Arts, including Thornton Dial's Blood And Meat: Survival For the World (1992) and Lost Cows (2000-1), Joe Light's Dawn (1988), Jessie T. Pettway's Bars and String-Pierced Columns (1950s), Lonnie Holley's Him and Her Hold the Root (1994) and Joe Minter's Camel at the Watering Hole (1995). The works were first exhibited in Revelations: Art from the African American South in 2018, and subsequently in the museum's permanent collection galleries dedicated to Modern and Contemporary American Art.

In July 2023, the Fine Arts Museums announced the promised gift by Bernard and Barbro Osher of 61 works of American art to the museums’ collection. ARTnews reported that the gift included works by well-known American artists such as Alexander Calder, Winslow Homer, Georgia O’Keeffe, John Singer Sargent, and Charles Sheeler. They figure alongside lesser-known artists such as the influential artist-teacher Frank DuMond, Boston school painter William McGregor Paxton, and the American Impressionists Edward Henry Potthast, Frederick Carl Frieseke, and Richard Edward Miller.

=== Archives of American Art ===
Since 1991, the American Art Department has housed a set of the Smithsonian Institution’s Archives of American Art microfilm collection. In conjunction with the Bothin Library and department research files, the American Art Study Center is the most important research center for American art on the West Coast.

=== European ===
In 2026, the museum displayed Monet and Venice, an exhibition that highlighted the key moments in Claude Monet's life in Venice that culminated in the Water Lilies series.

=== International contemporary ===
In 1988, the Fine Arts Museums made a commitment to collect international contemporary art. In addition to works in traditional media, this commitment has expanded the museums’ holdings of works in new or multiple media––including installation and conceptual works, video and other time-based media, and photography and other lens-based media––to more accurately reflect contemporary art practice.

Contemporary acquisitions include Wall of Light Horizon (2005), by Sean Scully and signature sculptures by Zhan Wang and Cornelia Parker. The strength of the collection lies in artists associated with California, including Piotr Abraszewski, Christopher Brown, Squeak Carnwath, Jim Christensen, Robert Colescott, Hung Liu, Bruce Nauman, Rachel Neubauer, Edward Ruscha and Masami Teraoka.

Lens-based and time-based media works include those by Nigel Poor, Catherine Wagner, Rebeca Bollinger, Alan Rath, The Propeller Group, Firelei Báez, Carrie Mae Weems, and Lisa Reihana. The museums have also acquired works by artists such as Anish Kapoor, Odd Nerdrum, Gottfried Helnwein, Doris Salcedo, David Nash, Rose B. Simpson, Barbara Hepworth, Richard Deacon, and Frank Bowling.

With a $1 million grant from the Svane Family Foundation, in 2023 the Fine Arts Museums acquired works by 30 Bay Area artists, including Wesaam Al-Badry, Rupy C. Tut, Woody D. Othello, and Chelsea Ryoko Wong. The exhibition Crafting Radicality: Bay Area Artists from the Svane Gift, on view at the de Young museum in 2023, displayed works from the gift, "captures the local moment," as reported by KQED.

The de Young also organized the first-ever retrospective of feminist art pioneer Judy Chicago in 2020, forty years after her landmark installation The Dinner Party (1974–79) made its debut in San Francisco.

Uncanny Valley: Being Human in the Age of AI, organized at the de Young in 2021 was the "first major exhibition to unpack this question through a lens of contemporary art and propose new ways of thinking about intelligence, nature, and artifice." Frieze magazine named it one of the top 10 exhibitions of the year.

In 2021, the de Young organized artist Hung Liu's solo show, Golden Gate (金門), an exhibition that centered on the immigrant and migrant experience in California.

Kehinde Wiley: An Archaeology of Silence, which was first seen at the 2022 Venice Biennale, opened in February 2023 at the de Young. The US debut of the exhibition was notable for its inclusive, sensitive interpretative approach, spearheaded by FAMSF's Director of Interpretation Jackson Abrams. A particularly notable aspect was the creation of a "respite room" where visitors could pause after visiting the exhibition. The presentation also included special programming with community partners, such as workshops on grief.

=== Textiles and costumes ===
The Fine Arts Museums' textiles collection boasts more than 13,000 textiles and costumes from around the world. It is one of the largest and most comprehensive collections of its type in the United States. It comprises costume and costume accessories; loom-woven textiles; non-woven fabrics; and objects whose primary decoration is produced through techniques such as beading and embroidery.

The de Young has exhibited fashion since the 1930s, with pieces by Dior, Balenciaga, Grès, Yves Saint Laurent, Chanel, Ralph Rucci, and Kaisik Wong. They have collections of 18th and 19th-century European fans, a lace collection, a group of European ecclesiastical vestments and furnishings, and a growing collection of contemporary wearable art.

In August 2017, the Summer of Love Experience: Art, Fashion, and Rock & Roll celebrated the 50th anniversary of the Summer of Love and featured fashion from the late sixties from the museum's permanent collection and on loan from Bay Area independent designers. The exhibit hosted 270,000 visitors.

In the fall of 2018, the de Young organized Contemporary Muslim Fashions. The exhibition explored Muslim female dress codes from multiple communities, cultures and religious interpretations, starting at the turn of the millennium. It was the first large scale exploration of the topic at an art institution, and included emerging and established designers and artists from Europe, the Middle East, South East Asia and the US. The exhibition travelled to Museum Angewandte Kunst in Frankfurt in 2019.

=== Africa, Oceania, and the Americas ===
More than 1,400 examples from the eastern Sudan, the Guinea coast, west and central Africa, eastern and southern Africa, and elsewhere on the continent are included in the Fine Arts Museums’ African art collection at the de Young. The African art collection is presented thematically rather than geographically, emphasizing the aesthetic and expressive qualities of the art.

The Oceanic collections were charter collections of the de Young, their nucleus formed in 1894 at the California Midwinter International Exposition in Golden Gate Park. Additional Oceanic works of sculpture, basket weaving, tapa cloths, ceramics, and stone tools have since been acquired, bringing the holdings to more than 3,000. Highlights of the collection include a 10-foot (3.0 m) housepost from the Iatmul people of the Sepik in Papua New Guinea, a group of brightly painted carvings used in malagan ceremonials of New Ireland, a roll of feather money from Nindu Island of Santa Cruz, a fan from the Marquesas Islands of Polynesia, a rare navigation figure from the Caroline Islands of Micronesia, and a selection of powerful wood carvings from the Māori people of New Zealand.

The Arts of Indigenous America collections are of national significance to art history, anthropology, and world history, and they have helped establish the de Young as a primary source for cultural research and study. The extensive collection of ancient American and Native American art comprises nearly 2,000 works of art from Meso-America, Central and South America, and the West Coast of North America. Art from cultures indigenous to the American continents was a defining feature of the museum's charter collection and continues to be an area of significant growth. Special galleries are devoted to ancient objects from Mexico, including an outstanding grouping of Teotihuacan murals.

== Selected collection highlights ==
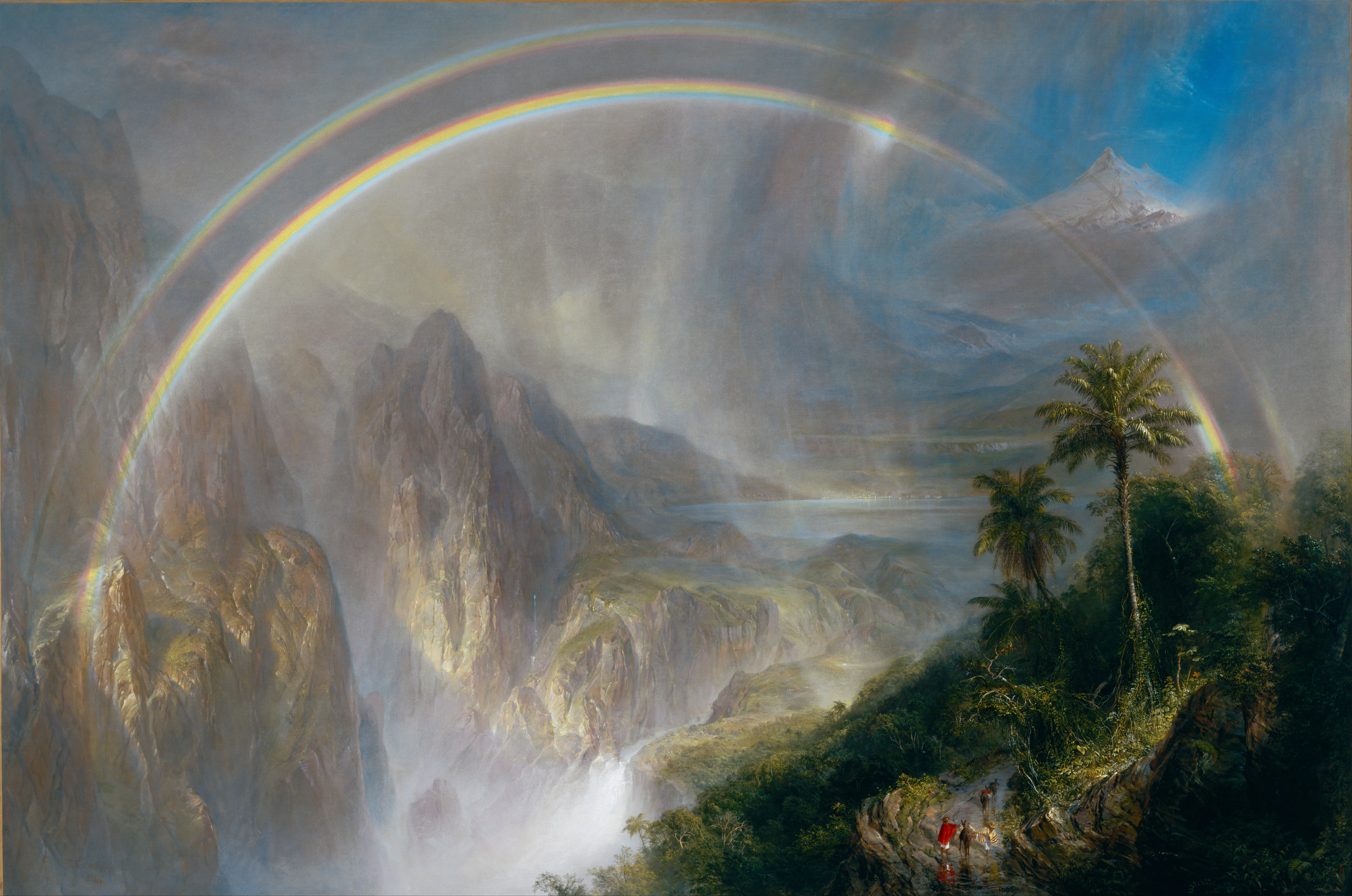
Frederic Edwin Church

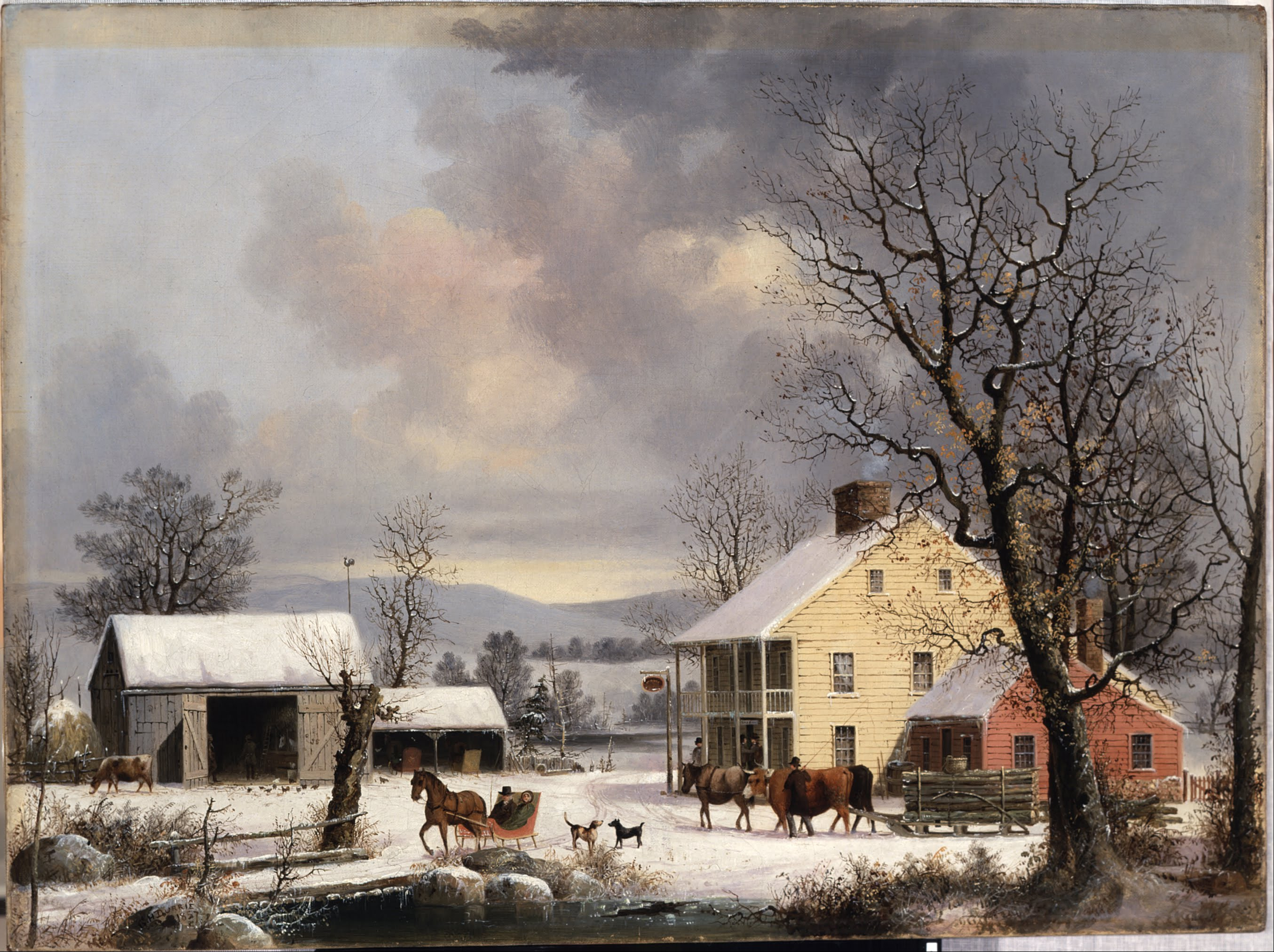
George Henry Durrie

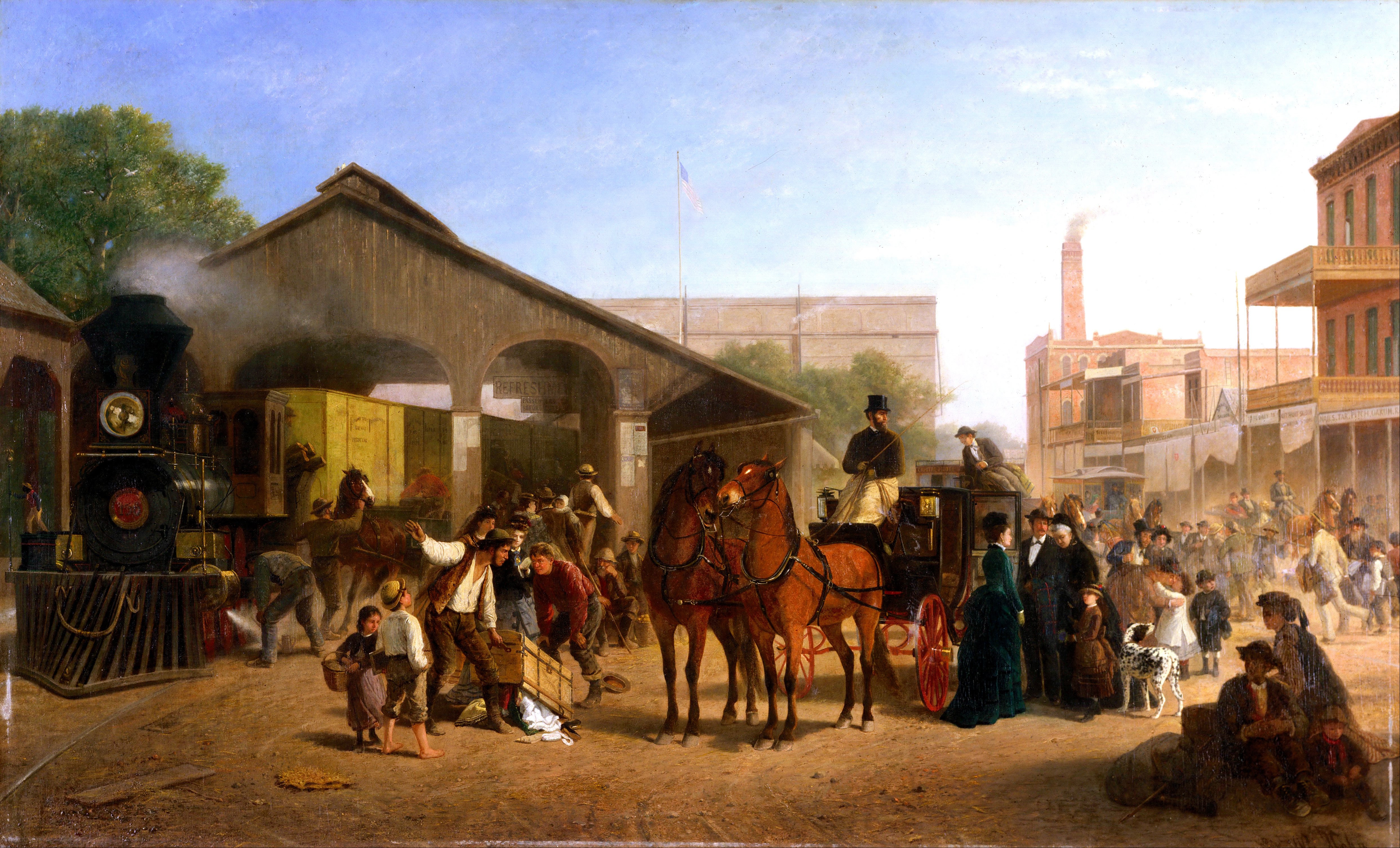
William Hahn

Teotihuacan mural fragment

== Architecture ==
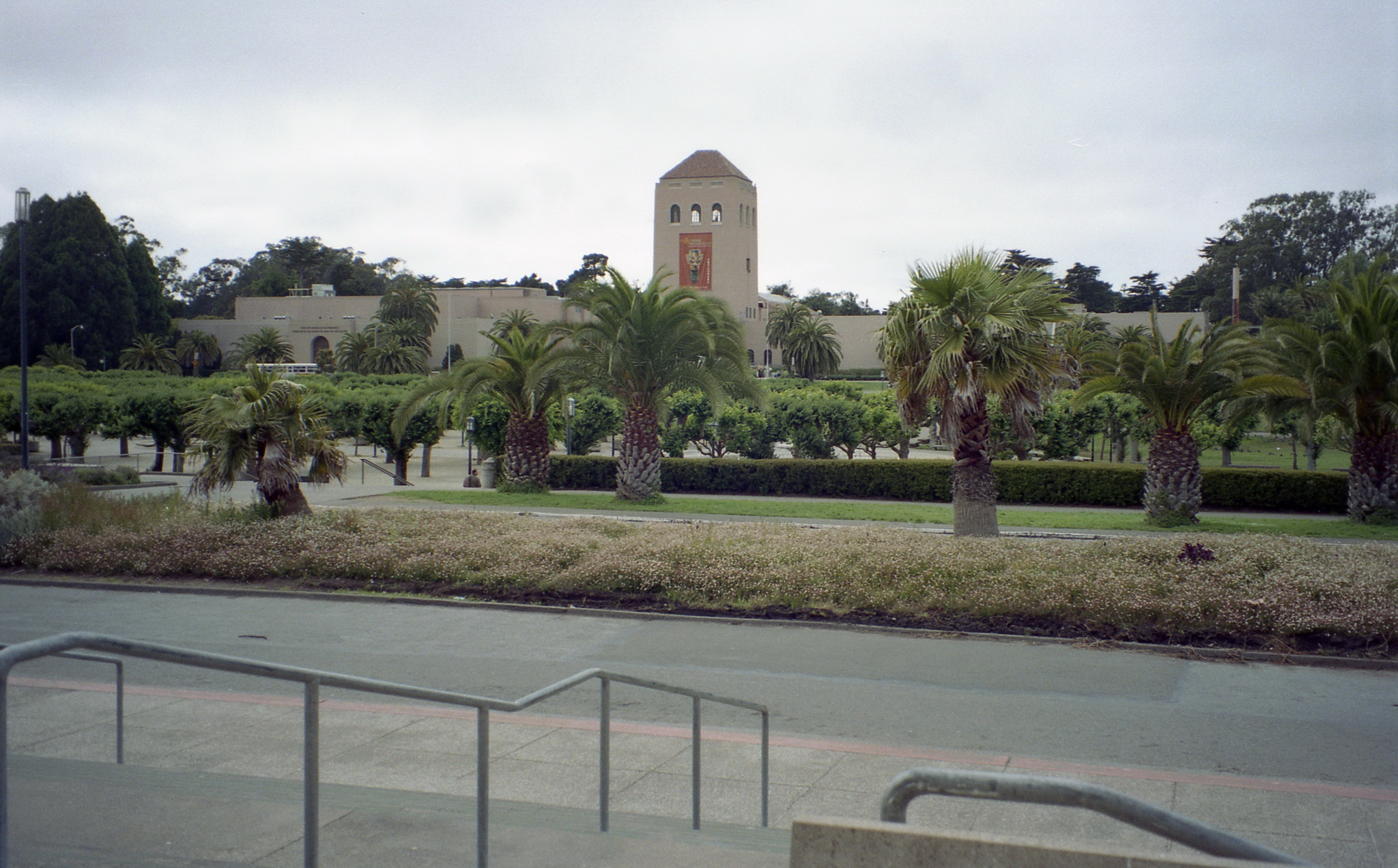
De Young Museum prior to 2005 reconstruction

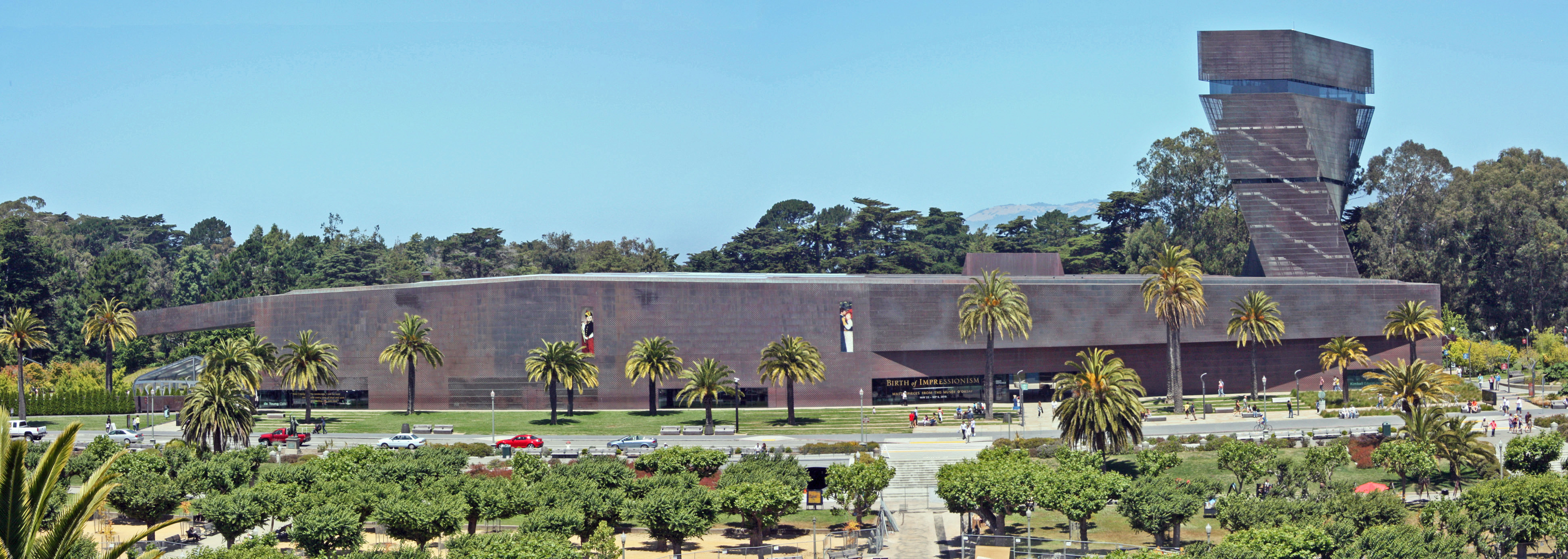
Museum, with Hamon Tower on the right

The current building was completed by architects Jacques Herzog, Pierre de Meuron and Fong + Chan and opened on October 15, 2005. Structural, civil and geotechnical engineering was provided by Rutherford + Chekene; Arup Group provided mechanical and electrical engineering. Herzog & de Meuron won the competition in January 1999 beating out other short-listed architects Tadao Ando and Antoine Predock. The terrain and seismic activity in San Francisco posed a challenge for the designers Herzog & de Meuron and principal architects Fong & Chan. To help withstand future earthquakes, "[the building] can move up to three feet (91 centimeters) due to a system of ball-bearing sliding plates and viscous fluid dampers that absorb kinetic energy and convert it to heat".

A new museum structure located in the middle of an urban park was initially controversial. San Francisco voters twice defeated bond measures that were to fund the new museum project. After the second defeat, the museum itself planned to relocate to a location in the Financial District until donors came forward to allow the museum to stay in Golden Gate Park.

The designers were sensitive to the appearance of the building in its natural setting. Walter J. Hood, a landscape architect based in Oakland, California, designed the museum's new gardens. The entire exterior is clad in 163,118 sq ft (15,154.2 m^{2}) of copper, which is expected to eventually oxidize and take on a greenish tone and a distinct texture to echo the nearby eucalyptus. In order to further harmonize with the surroundings, shapes were cut into the top to reveal gardens and courtyards where 48 trees had been planted; the giant tree-ferns that form a backdrop for the museum entrance are particularly dramatic. 5.12 acres (20,700 square meters) of new landscaping were planted as well, with 344 transplanted trees and 69 historic boulders. The building is clad with variably perforated and dimpled copper plates, whose patina will slowly change through exposure to the elements. This exterior facade was developed and fabricated by engineers at Zahner.

== Hamon Observation Tower ==
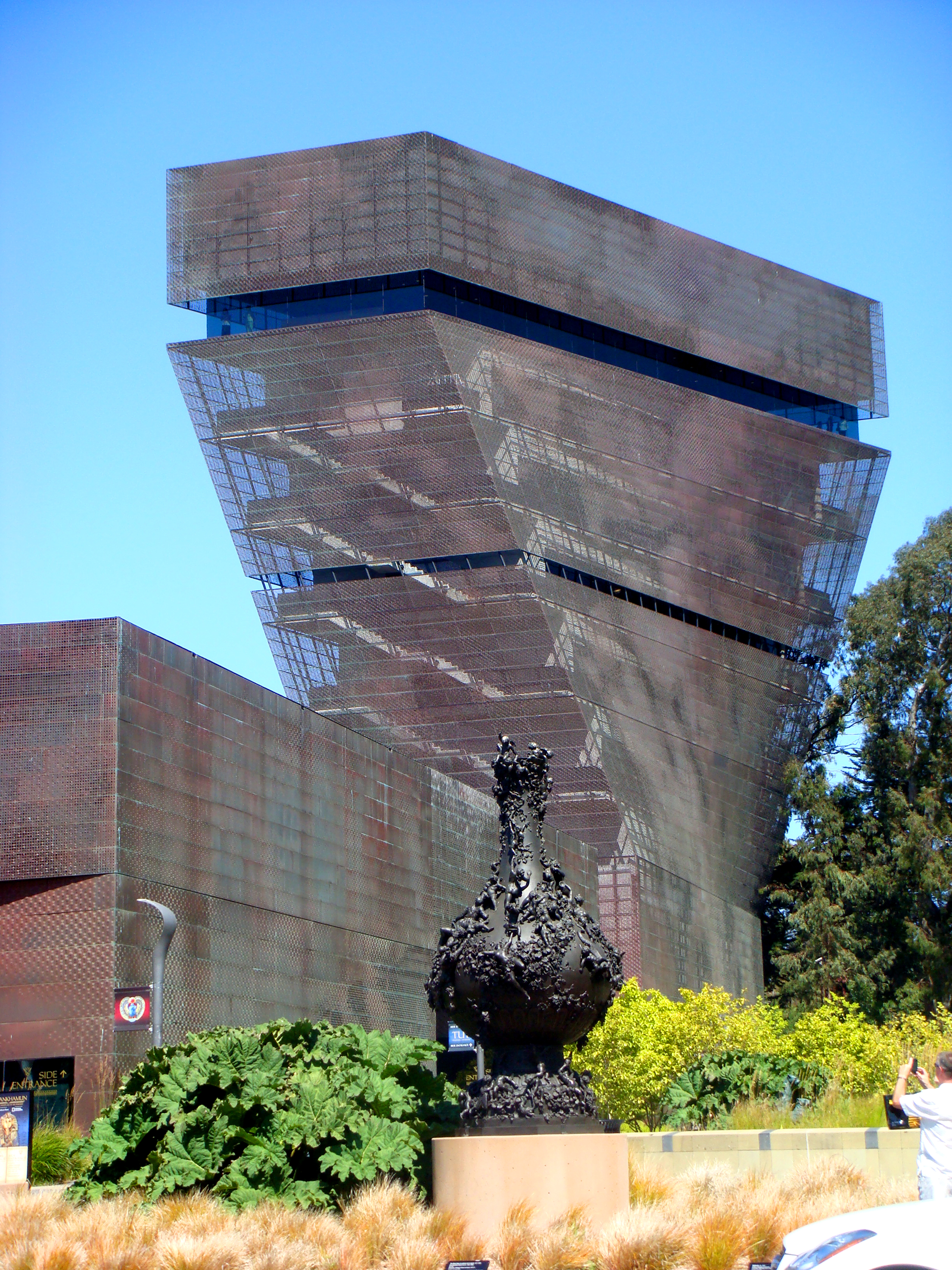
Hamon Observation Tower

Hamon Observation Tower is a 144 feet (44 m) tall tower attached to the de Young Museum that is the tallest point in Golden Gate Park. Entry is free using an elevator to the right of the admissions desk to the ninth floor. In 2023, it saw about 1000 guests per week. The tower replaces an older version from the prior building that had to be completely rebuilt after the 1989 earthquake. The tower is made of copper so that it will turn green over time as it oxidizes. It also features a giant satellite map of San Francisco. It has 360 degree views, including views of the Pacific Ocean, Marin Headlands, the Golden Gate Bridge and San Francisco Bay.

=== Reception ===
In 2021, The Telegraph recommended the tower for those who only have 48 hours to spend in San Francisco. In 2022, the Los Angeles Times rated it the 33rd best thing to do in California. In 2024, The New York Times included it in its recommendations for 36 hours in San Francisco.

== Three Gems ==
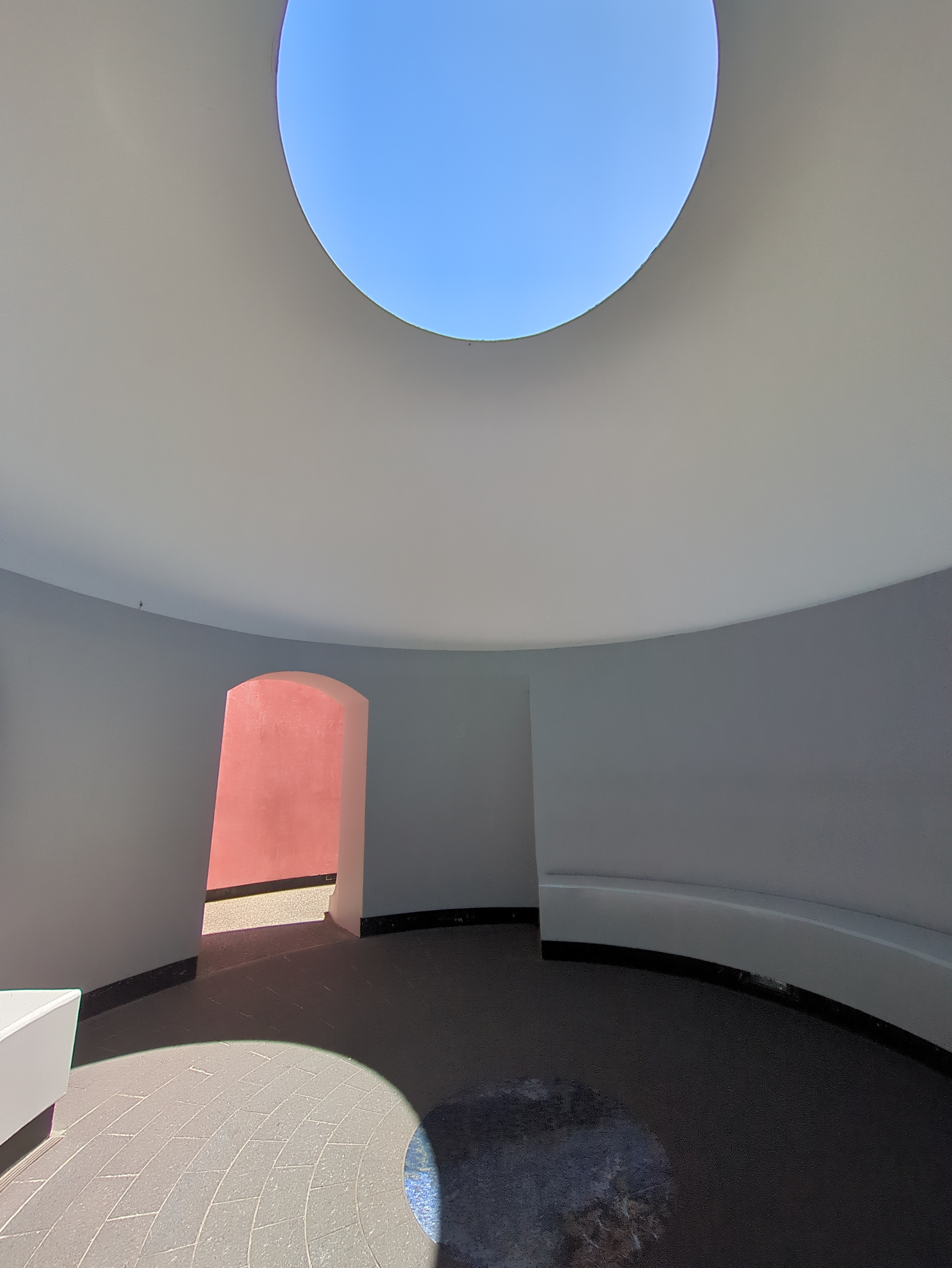
Inside the Three Gems skyspace

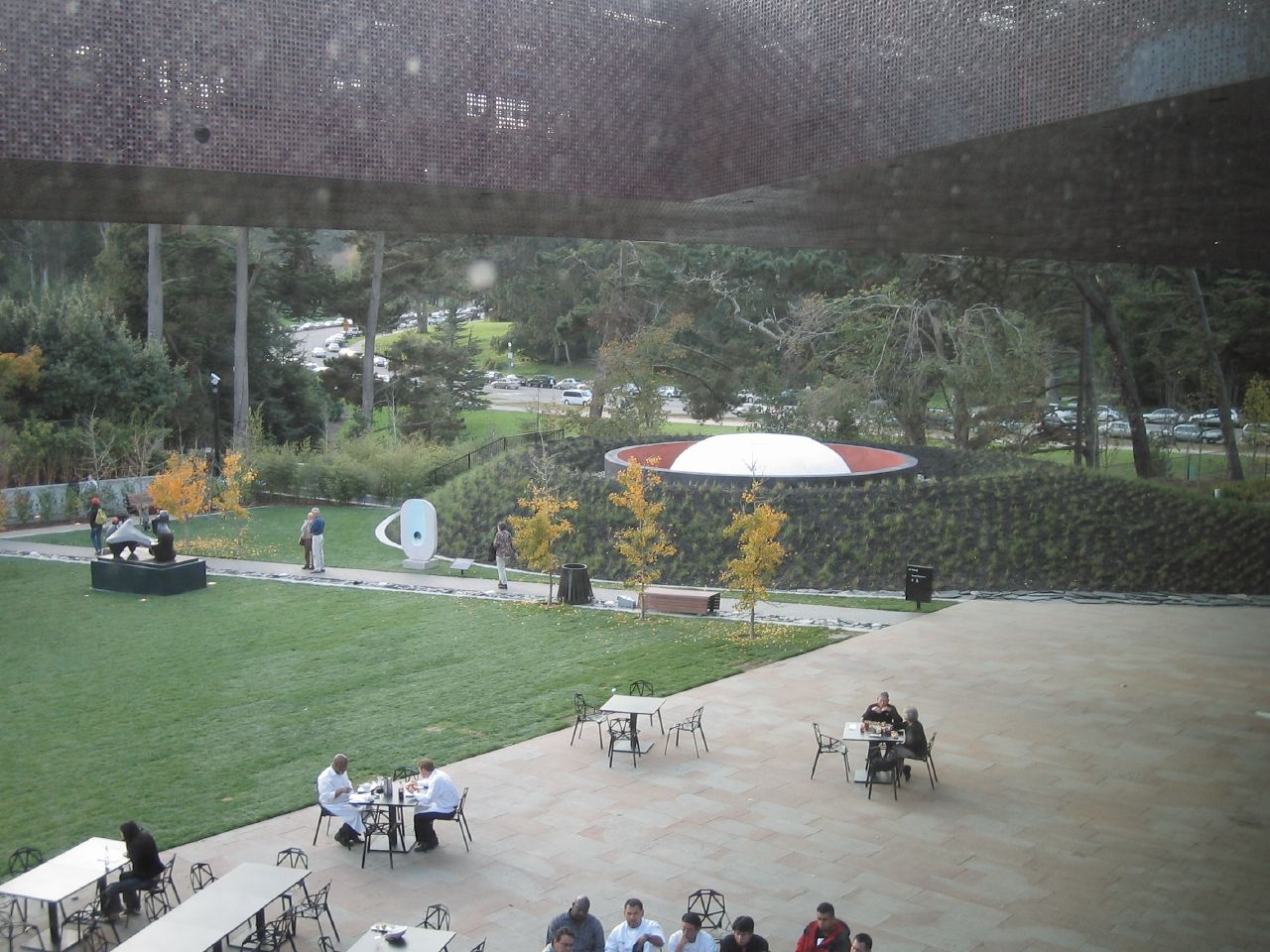
2005 view of Three Gems

Three Gems (2005) was installed as a permanent fixture at the de Young Museum. It is James Turrell's first Skyspace to adopt the stupa form. It is built into a dune and has an oculus to encourage viewing the sky as a piece of art, subtly enhanced by LED lights. The Three Gems is largely hidden from view and is accessed by a tunnel.

== See also ==
- List of largest art museums
- List of most-visited art museums
- List of most-visited museums in the United States
- Bouquets to Art, annual floral exhibition based on collections in the museum
