= Rupy C. Tut =

Indian-American visual artist

- Born: c. 1985 – c. 1986; Chandigarh, India
- Education: UCLA, Loma Linda University
- Style: Indian miniature paintings
- Website: www.rupyctut.com

Rupy C. Tut (born c. 1985 – c. 1986) is an Indian-born American visual artist. She specializes in eco-feminist paintings made using knowledge and training in 18th century traditional Indian Pahari painting. Tut is based in Oakland, California.

== Early life and education ==
Tut's grandparents were displaced during the Partition of India. She was born in Chandigarh and lived in the state of Punjab in India until her family relocated to Southern California in the United States when she was eleven or twelve.

In 2006, she graduated from UCLA with a degree in evolutionary and ecological biology and a minor in South Asian studies. She then attended Loma Linda University, graduating with a master's in global health in 2009. She married, and in 2011, moved to the Bay Area.

== Artwork ==
While applying for jobs in public health, Tut began painting and studied traditional Pahari painting from 2016 to 2021. She makes her own pigments and uses hemp paper or linen. Her work focuses on women, migration, and the natural world.

Tut's paintings have been displayed at various institutions, including the De Young Museum and the Asian Art Museum. She has had solo shows at the Triton Museum of Art, the Jessica Silverman gallery, and the Institute of Contemporary Art San Francisco.
