= Bouquets to Art =

Bouquets to Art is an annual floral exhibition hosted by the De Young Museum of Fine Arts Museums of San Francisco. Florists, designers and garden clubs are invited to present floral interpretations of works in the museum's permanent collections, and the floral displays are presented in juxtaposition with the works that inspired them.

The Fine Arts Museums of San Francisco consist of the Legion of Honor and the de Young Museum. For several years, while the de Young Museum was closed for construction, the exhibition was presented at the Legion. In 2006, with the reopening of the de Young, Bouquets to Art returned there.
