= Mara Benjamin =

American scholar of Jewish studies

- Occupation: Jewish studies scholar
- Partner: Miryam Kabakov (m. 2004)
- Awards: Guggenheim Fellowship (2024)

Academic background
- Education: Hampshire College; Oxford Centre for Hebrew and Jewish Studies; Stanford University
- Thesis: Franz Rosenzweig and scripture (2005)
- Doctoral advisor: Arnold Eisen

Academic work
- Discipline: Jewish studies
- Sub-discipline: Modern Jewish studies
- Institutions: St. Olaf College; Mount Holyoke College

Mara H. Benjamin is an American scholar of modern Jewish studies. A 2024 Guggenheim Fellow, she is the author of Rosenzweig's Bible and The Obligated Self and is Irene Kaplan Leiwant Professor of Jewish Studies at Mount Holyoke College.

== Biography ==
Mara Hillary Benjamin was born to Judith Benjamin, a North Seattle College ESL teacher, and Kenneth Collins, a Los Alamos National Laboratory senior security advisor. Her paternal grandfather, Samuel Carl Collins, was born to Jewish parents from Brownsville, Brooklyn, who had previously emigrated from Odesa in present-day Ukraine. She later adopted the surname of her stepfather, environmental engineer and University of Washington professor Mark M. Benjamin. She attended Garfield High School, during which, amidst warming Soviet Union–United States relations, she was part of the KING-TV/Gosteleradio Teen Space Bridge project with students in 1988.

Benjamin obtained her BA at Hampshire College and her PhD (2005) in modern Jewish thought at the Stanford University Department of Religious Studies, as well as a diplomat in Jewish studies at Oxford Centre for Hebrew and Jewish Studies. Her doctoral dissertation Franz Rosenzweig and scripture was supervised by Arnold Eisen. She was the 2004-2005 Hazel D. Cole Fellow at the University of Washington Stroum Center for Jewish Studies and the 2005–2007 Jacob and Hilda Blaustein Postdoctoral Fellow at Yale University. In 2008, she joined St. Olaf College as Assistant Professor of Religion. In 2017, she moved to Mount Holyoke College, where she had previously worked as an auditor for Mount Holyoke professor Lawrence Fine while studying at Hampshire, and subsequently became the Irene Kaplan Leiwant Professor of Jewish Studies.

Benjamin specializes in modern Jewish studies. In 2009, she published her first book, a monograph on Jewish philosopher Franz Rosenzweig named Rosenzweig's Bible. She won the 2019 American Academy of Religion Book Award in Constructive-Reflective Studies for her next book The Obligated Self (2018). In 2024, she was awarded a Guggenheim Fellowship in Religion.

=== Personal life ===
In 2004, Benjamin entered a partnership with social worker Miryam Kabakov.

Originally frequenting a Conservative synagogue, Benjamin later shifted towards being shomer Shabbat after meeting Kabakov. She also planned to attend a Jewish seminary but decided against it after realizing that she would have to work on Shabbat as a rabbi.

== Bibliography ==
- Rosenzweig's Bible (2009)
- The Obligated Self (2018)
