= Antonietta Grassi =

Canadian artist

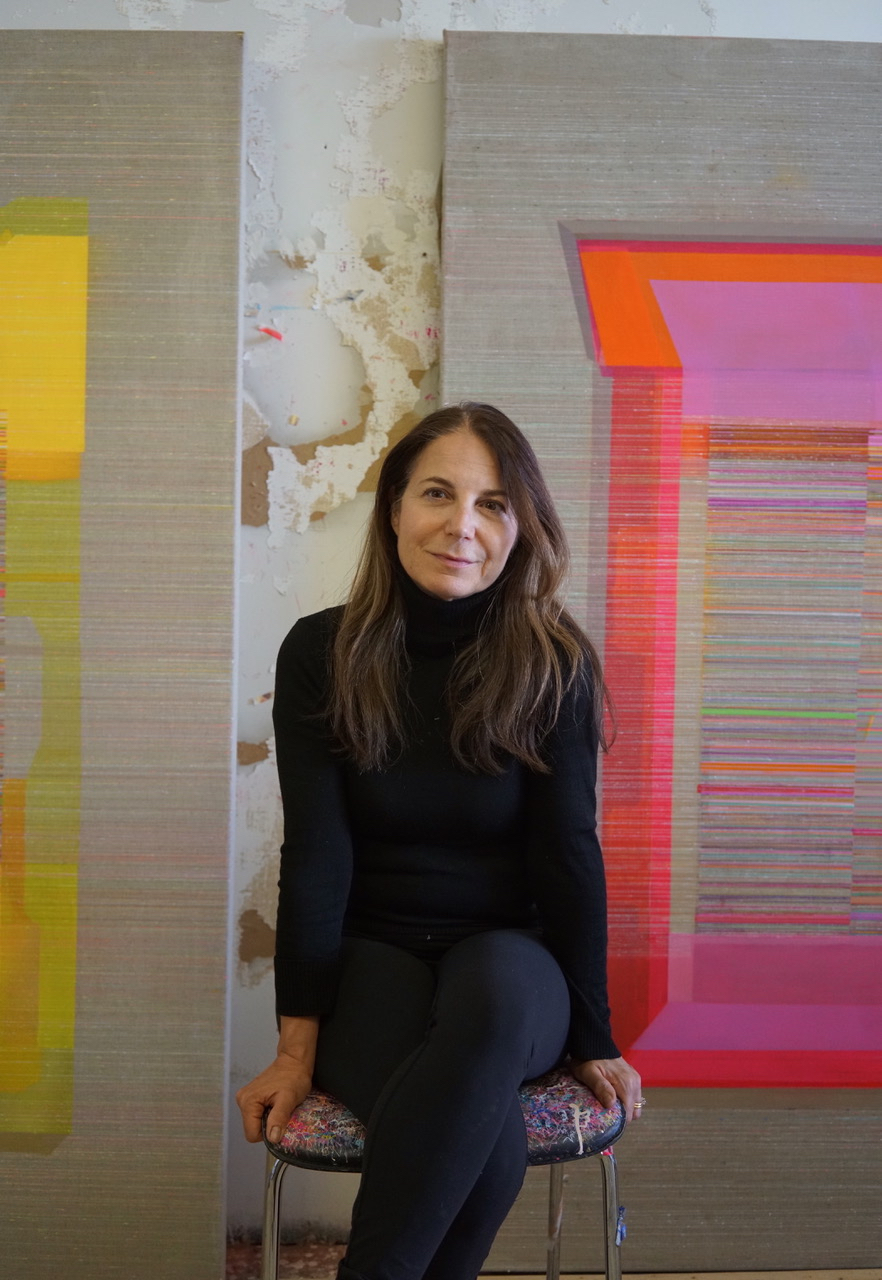
- Grassi in 2020
- Born: 1965 (age 60–61); Montreal, Québec, Canada
- Known for: Painting
- Website: antoniettagrassi.com

Antonietta Grassi is a contemporary Canadian artist based in Montreal, Quebec. She is known for her geometric abstract paintings which reference textiles, architecture, analog technologies and the history of 20th-century painting. Her work has been featured in solo and group exhibitions in museums and galleries in Canada, the United States, and in Europe

== Early life ==
Antonietta Grassi was born in Montreal, Canada in 1965 and is of Italian ancestry. Grassi's mother and aunts worked in the textile factories doing piece work when they immigrated to Montreal from Italy in the late fifties.

After graduating with a diploma in design from Ryerson University in 1987, she began her career as a designer and color researcher in the textile and fashion industries in Montreal.

== Art career ==
Grassi enrolled part time at Concordia University in the early nineties. She studied there under abstract painter Yves Gaucher who was an important mentor. Grassi was included in the 2002 exhibition at Concordia University's Leonard and Bina Ellen Art Gallery entitled Yves Gaucher, which included works by Gaucher and "...brings together the works of ten artists who have worked with Yves in one way or another and have acknowledged the significance of the encounter. Most were students of his at Concordia, and each one provides a different perspective. Antonietta Grassi (BFA 1994) and Brigitte Radecki (BFA 1978) cite Yves as an important mentor as they attempt to both embrace and critique the language of formalism." She obtained her Bachelor of Fine Arts in 1994, after which she left the fashion industry to dedicate herself full time to her art career. She received a MFA from the Université du Québec à Montréal in 1997. Upon graduating, Grassi exhibited in numerous group and solo shows.

Grassi was part of two large multi-gallery painting shows in Montreal put on by the Association de galeries d’art contemporain: Peinture Peinture (1998) and Pictura: Painting in Montréal’s Image (2020). She was part of the 2021 Symposium de Baie-Saint-Paul, and one of a dozen artists in the Future in Mind exhibition in the Canadian Pavilion at Expo 2020 in Dubai. She has had solo shows of her painting series in her commercial galleries and in public art spaces, including:

- Le projet cicatrice (partie 1) (Centre Clark, Montréal, 1997)
- Scar Calendar (UNIT/PITT, formerly the Helen Pitt Gallery, Vancouver, 1997)
- Babble (and other coded language) (Galerie Lilian Rodriguez, Montréal, 2002)
- Mots perdus (Galerie Esthésio, Quebec, 2005)
- Contemplation for Obsolete Objects (Galerie Patrick Mikhail, 2018 and Harcourt House, 2019)
- Lifelines (Patrick Mikhail Gallery, 2020 and Ottawa City Hall Art Gallery, 2021)
- Zip Stack Flow (Patrick Mikhail Gallery, 2022)

She was part of the stable of artists at a number of commercial galleries including Galerie Lilian Rodriquez in Montréal. Since 2017, she is exclusively represented by Patrick Mikhail Gallery, Montréal. Grassi has been a professor in the Visual Arts department at Dawson College since 1998.

== Art practice ==
Grassi's work draws from the history of 20th century abstraction. Her use of color has been compared to that of the early American abstract expressionist painter Helen Frankenthaler, and her interest in hand-drawn grids compared to Canadian-born American minimalist painter Agnes Martin. Grassi prefers to paint on raw linen or canvas using acrylic and oil paints. She builds up multi-layered surfaces of paint that are intersected by thread-like lines. Her paintings have been likened to geometric poems, woven with threads that connect early computer coding and textiles with personal and collective memory. Starting in 2018, Grassi became interested in the link between woven textiles and computers when she learned that the Jacquard loom (1804) had inspired the Analytical Engine, an 1837 mechanical-computing device invented by English mathematicians Charles Babbage and Ada Lovelace. These ideas affected the imagery and painting techniques that dominated the subsequent body of her artwork. They also lead the artist to pay homage to the contributions of women computer scientists and mathematicians, such as Lovelace and Grace Hopper, by referring directly to their names or to their discoveries in her paintings’ titles (ex. ADA, 2019, Break Point, 2019, FlowMatic, 2019, Compiler, 2020).

== Collections ==
Grassi's works are in the collections of the Conseil des arts et des lettres du Québec (CALQ), and the Musée national des beaux-arts du Québec (MNBAQ),

== Awards ==
Guggenheim Fellowship in Fine Arts, John Simon Guggenheim Memorial Foundation, 2024
