= Margaret Stratton =

American photographer and video artist

Margaret Stratton (born 1953) is an American photographer and video artist. Her work in photography has been exhibited at the Smithsonian Institution, Her videos are represented by the Video Data Bank, and have been screened nationally and internationally, as noted in the Harvard Crimson, Wild Women Storm the Film Archive, The Berlin Film Festival. Awards include the Director's Award: Black Maria Film Festival, Los Angeles, CA.

She is a professor at the University of Iowa.

Stratton is a graduate of the Evergreen State College (BA, 1977), the University of New Mexico (MA, 1983 and MFA, 1985).
