= Rebeca Bollinger =

American artist

- Born: Los Angeles, California, United States
- Education: San Francisco Art Institute
- Known for: Photography, sculpture, video, drawing
- Awards: National Endowment for the Arts, Artadia
- Website: Rebeca Bollinger

Rebeca Bollinger (born Los Angeles, California) is an American artist. She works with sculpture, photography, video, drawing, installation, writing and sound.

== Early life and education ==
Bollinger was born and raised in Los Angeles. She completed her BFA in Painting from the San Francisco Art Institute (SFAI) in 1993.

== Work ==
Rebeca Bollinger, Untitled (nillas), ink on cookies, shrink wrap, 18" x 9" x 2.5", 1997.

Bollinger first gained notice for her video Alphabetically Sorted (1994), a found object of 644 keywords from a CompuServe photography forum called "Plain Brown Wrapper," which were then alphabetized and read by Victoria: High Quality, an early Apple PlainTalk electronic voice. New York Times critic Roberta Smith noted the work's sociological slant and "surprisingly inflected" narration suggesting "a kind of found poetry."

From 1995-1997, she imprinted downloaded portraits from early websites onto baked goods using a commercial baking printer called the Sweet Art Machine. These installations and sculptures featured shrink-wrapped cookies, cakes, crackers and video projection. In the late 1990s, Bollinger aggregated image searches and stock photography archives online to create colored pencil drawings and wall-sized video projections for the "Similar/Same" series (1999-2000.)

Rebeca Bollinger, Background, glazed ceramic, 7.5" x 10.5" x 6", 2010.

In the 2000s, Bollinger began creating a repository of her own photographs of everyday subjects, which she catalogued and presented in video projections and works on paper exploring uncertainty, the fragmentation of experience, and randomness. The video projection Fields (2001) presented this archive as time-based abstractions, along with drawings and photographs. Critics suggest that the chance structuring of the work enabled surprising forms of beauty reminiscent of the rhythms and randomness of John Cage compositions. In Here to There (2007), she extended this work into sculptural space, projecting sequences of multiple images onto a freestanding wall with raised wood boxes to form collage-like wholes that combined Cubist-like fragmentation with cinematic duration and dissolves.

Rebeca Bollinger, Darling Dark Direct Directly, installation view, acrylic on framed cork board, poured aluminum, pearl head straight pins, wood, plywood, dowels, porcelain clamp lamps, LED flood lights, power strip, extension cord, 76" x 189" x 37.5", 2018.

Beginning in 2010, Bollinger increasingly translated two-dimensional images and ephemeral experiences into three-dimensional space and physical objects (e.g., Background, 2010). Using photography as a structural base to extract shapes and abstractions, she produced works such as Color Study (2010), which combined a single photograph with glazed ceramic elements. In later sculpture, installations and performances, she aggregated materials and objects—found ephemera, her own hand built ceramics, cast glass, bronze and poured aluminum elements, imprinted cork boards, and writing—much as earlier work aggregated images (e.g., Darling Dark Direct Directly, 2018).

== Recognition ==
Bollinger has been recognized by SFMOMA (SECA Electronic Media) (1996), the Bay Area Video Coalition (1996, 2008), Fleishhacker Foundation (1997), National Endowment for the Arts (1999), Artadia (2001), and Center for Cultural Innovation (2014), and received the James D. Phelan Art Award in Video (2004). She has been recognized with artist residencies from the Headlands Center for the Arts (1996), Loyola University New Orleans (1998), The Lab (1999), Dennis Gallagher and Sam Perry Ceramic Program (2010), and Mills College Art Museum (2018). Bollinger is featured in the book Radical Light: Alternative Film and Video in the San Francisco Bay Area, 1945–2000 (2010), and her work belongs to the public art collections of SFMOMA, de Young Museum, San Jose Museum of Art, Oakland International Airport, University of California, San Francisco, and Video Data Bank. Rebeca Bollinger is a 2024 John Simon Guggenheim Fellow.
