= Vincent Lloyd =

American theologian, author, and academic

Vincent W. Lloyd
- Education: Princeton University (BA); University of California, Berkeley (MA, PhD)
- Occupations: Theologian, author, academic
- Theological work
- Main interests: Africana Studies, theology

Vincent W. Lloyd is an American theologian and author. He is the director of Africana Studies at Villanova University. He now teaches as a visiting faculty member at Deep Springs College.

Lloyd received a B.A. from Princeton University and both an M.A. and a Ph.D. from the University of California, Berkeley.

== Books ==
- Black Dignity: The Struggle Against Domination (Yale University Press, 2022) ISBN 9780300253672
- Break Every Yoke: Religion, Justice, and the Abolition of Prisons, with Joshua Dubler (Oxford University Press, 2019) ISBN 9780190949150
- In Defense of Charisma (Columbia University Press, 2018) ISBN 9780231183864
- Religion of the Field Negro: On Black Secularism and Black Theology (Fordham University Press, 2017)
- Black Natural Law (Oxford University Press, 2016) ISBN 9780199362189
- The Problem with Grace: Reconfiguring Political Theology (Stanford University Press, 2011)
- Law and Transcendence: On the Unfinished Project of Gillian Rose (Palgrave, 2009) ISBN 9780230210479
- (co-editor) Anti-Blackness and Christian Ethics (Orbis, 2017) ISBN 9781626982512
- (co-editor) Race and Secularism in America (Columbia University Press, 2016) ISBN 9780231174916
- (co-editor) Sainthood and Race: Marked Flesh, Holy Flesh (Routledge, 2014) ISBN 9781138547056
- (editor) Race and Political Theology (Stanford University Press, 2012) ISBN 9780804773157
- (co-editor) Secular Faith (Wipf and Stock Cascade, 2010) ISBN 9781498212311
