= Harold Mendez =

Chicago-born Artist (born 1977)

- Born: 1977; Chicago
- Alma mater: University of Illinois Chicago
- Occupation: Visual artist
- Awards: Guggenheim Fellowship (fine art, 2024, 2024)

Harold Mendez (born 1977) is a Chicago-born artist based in Los Angeles. He is best known for his work in the 2017 Whitney Biennial and has also had work exhibited in and collected by the Museum of Modern Art, Studio Museum in Harlem, Smart Museum of Art, Institute of Contemporary Art (Los Angeles), Institute of Contemporary Art (Miami), Wattis Institute for Contemporary Arts, Whitney Museum of American Art, and the Wexner Center for the Arts.

== Personal life ==
In 1977, Harold Mendez was born in Chicago, Illinois. He is a first generation American and his father is from Mexico and his mother is from Colombia.

== Career ==
Mendez graduated from the University of Illinois Chicago with a Master in Fine Art in 2007.

In 2017, Mendez's work was displayed in the front window at the Tiffany & Co. flagship store alongside the work of Carrie Moyer, Shara Hughes, Ajay Kurian, and Raúl de Nieves to celebrate the Whitney Biennial. In the same year, Mendez participated in a cultural exchange trip to Havana with five other Chicago artists hosted by the National Museum of Mexican Art and sponsored by the MacArthur Foundation International Connections Fundl.

In 2018, Mendez' work was featured at the Museum of Modern Art "Being New Photography 2018" exhibit.

In 2019, his work was featured in the exhibit CROSS CURRENTS / INTERCAMBIO CULTURAL at the Smart Museum of Art. His 2019 piece A new place to drown is held at the Whitney Museum of American Art.

In 2020, Mendez held a solo exhibition at the Logan Center Gallery in Chicago titled Harold Mendez: The years now. From September 2020 to January 2021, the Institute of Contemporary Art (Los Angeles) hosted a solo exhibit of Mendez' work titled Harold Mendez: Let us gather in a flourishing way, which was curated by Jamillah James.

From November 2021 to May 2022, Mendez had his solo show “And, perhaps, here, between” at the Institute of Contemporary Art (Miami), which centered work inspired from his 2017 cultural exchange trip. Also in 2022, Mendez was featured in the exhibit Drum Listens to Heart at the Wattis Institute for Contemporary Arts.

In 2023, Mendez, Sahar Khoury, and Jumana Manna participated on a panel and held simultaneous exhibitions at the Wexner Center for the Arts. Mendez' exhibit at the Wexner Center for the Arts - one way to transform and two and three - is his largest exhibition to date and consists of more than thirty of his works.

Mendez also has work in Studio Museum in Harlem's permanent collection.
