= Carol E. Harrison =

American academic

- Occupation: Historian
- Spouse: Tom Brown
- Awards: Guggenheim Fellowship (2024); Rome Prize (2024)

Academic background
- Education: Louisiana State University; University of Oxford
- Thesis: The esprit d'association and the French bourgeoisie: voluntary societies in eastern France, 1830-1870 (1993)

Academic work
- Discipline: History
- Sub-discipline: History of France; History of the Catholic Church
- Institutions: Auburn University; Kent State University; University of South Carolina

Carol Elizabeth Harrison is an American historian who has written on the history of France and the Catholic Church, including the books The Bourgeois Citizen in Nineteenth-Century France (1999) and Romantic Catholics (2014). A 2024 Guggenheim Fellow, she has worked as a history professor at Auburn University, Kent State University, and the University of South Carolina.

== Biography ==
Carol Elizabeth Harrison, a native of Baton Rouge, was born to Kay and Doug Harrison. She attended Baton Rouge Magnet High School, where she was a state French club quiz bee champion. She later studied at Louisiana State University, obtaining her BA in 1990. In 1989, she was elected Louisiana's 1990 Rhodes Scholar, as well as LSU's first woman Rhodes Scholar.

Now a Rhodes Scholar, Harrison obtained her PhD at the University of Oxford in 1993; her doctoral dissertation was titled The esprit d'association and the French bourgeoisie: voluntary societies in eastern France, 1830-1870. The same year, she became an assistant professor in history at Auburn University, and in 1997 she moved to Kent State University with that same title. After being promoted to associate professor in 2001, she moved to the University of South Carolina in 2002 and was promoted to professor in 2013.

Harrison authored the books The Bourgeois Citizen in Nineteenth-Century France (1999) and Romantic Catholics (2014), and she has also written several scholarly journal articles on the history of France and Catholic Church. In 2009, she and Ann Johnson co-edited the volume National Identity: The Role of Science and Technology, adapted from an Osiris special issue named Science and National Identity. She served as a co-editor of the journals Proceedings of the Western Society for French History from 2004 to 2007 and French Historical Studies from 2014 to 2018. In 2014, she wrote a New York Times Opinionator article on the Édouard René de Laboulaye novel Paris in America.

In 2024, Harrison was awarded a Guggenheim Fellowship in Religion and a Rome Prize in Modern Italian Studies, both of which will fund research for A Women’s History of Vatican I, her book on the First Vatican Council.

Harrison married Tom Brown while working on Romantic Catholics. John Beall Jr, who was the first Spirit Rider at Oklahoma State University, was his first cousin once removed on her mother's side.

== Bibliography ==
- The Bourgeois Citizen in Nineteenth-Century France (1999)
- (ed. with Ann Johnson) National Identity: The Role of Science and Technology (2009)
- Romantic Catholics (2014)
