= Petia Vlahovska =

Bulgarian chemical engineer

- Петя Влаховска
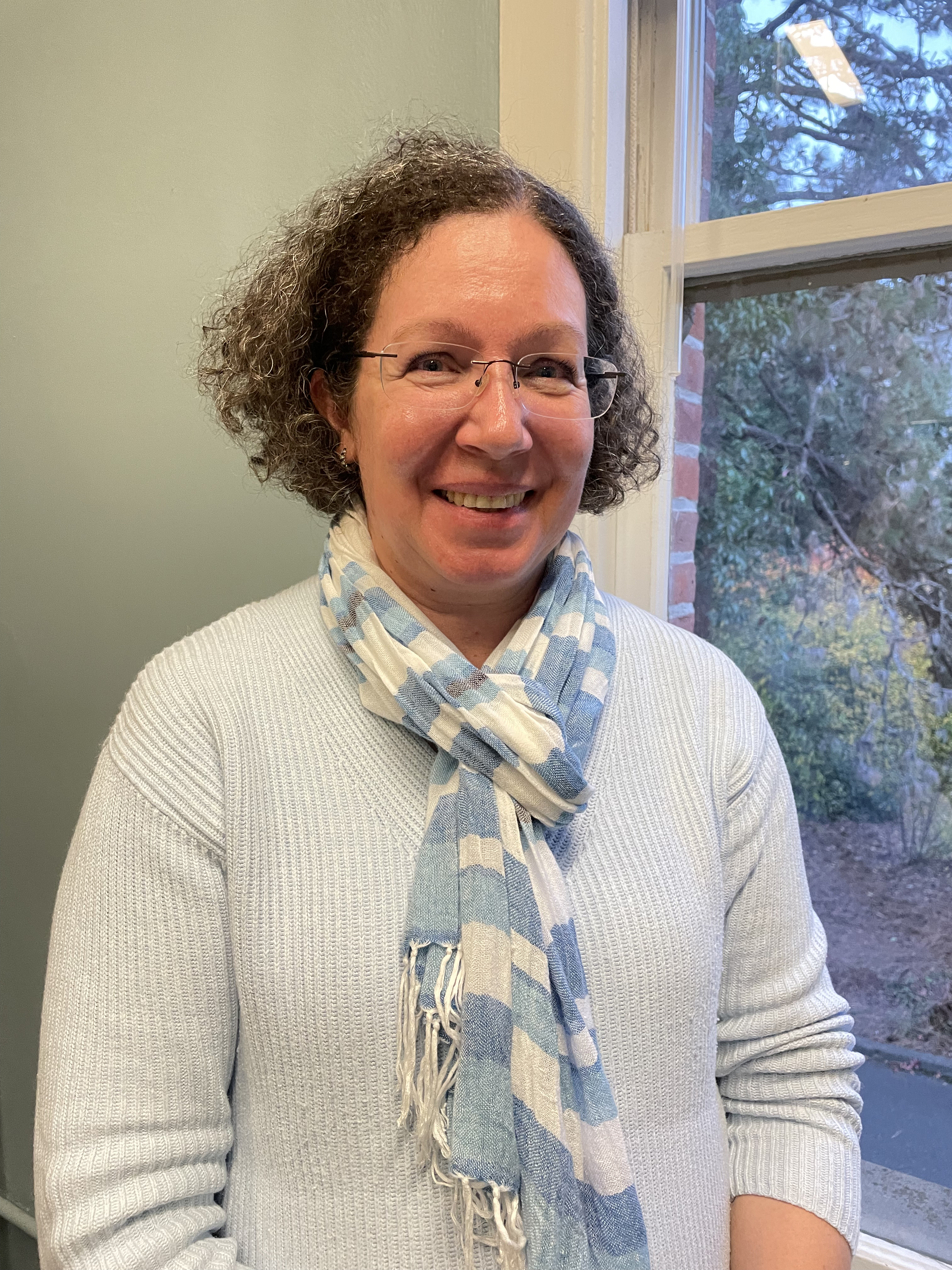
- Born: 1972 or 1973 (age 53–54)
- Occupation: Engineer
- Awards: Fellow of the American Physical Society (2019); Guggenheim Fellow (2024)

Academic background
- Education: Sofia University; Yale University
- Thesis: Dynamics of a surfactant-covered drop and the non-Newtonian rheology of emulsions (2003)
- Doctoral advisor: Jerzy Blawzdziewicz; Michael Loewenberg

Academic work
- Sub-discipline: Biophysical engineering; Fluid mechanics
- Institutions: Brown University; Dartmouth College; Northwestern University

Petia Mladenova Vlahovska (born circa 1973) is a Bulgarian engineer specializing in biophysics and fluid mechanics. A 2019 Fellow of the American Physical Society and 2024 Guggenheim Fellow, she is a professor in the McCormick School of Engineering, in the Department of Engineering Sciences and Applied Mathematics.

== Biography ==
Vlahovska was born in around 1973 to parents who were engineers. Moving from her native northern Bulgaria, she obtained her MSc (1994) in Chemistry at Sofia University, where she later started her postgraduate studies as a research associate at the Laboratory of Chemical Physics and Engineering. She later moved across the Atlantic Ocean to Yale University, where she obtained her MS in Chemical Engineering (1999), MPhil in Mechanical Engineering (2001), and PhD in Chemical Engineering (2003); her doctoral dissertation Dynamics of a surfactant-covered drop and the non-Newtonian rheology of emulsions was supervised by Jerzy Blawzdziewicz and Michael Loewenberg. She was later a David Crighton Fellow (2004-2005) at the Department of Applied Mathematics and Theoretical Physics at the University of Cambridge.

After visiting positions at the Brown University School of Engineering (2003-2005) and a postdoctoral fellow at the Max Planck Institute of Colloids and Interfaces Theory and Bio-systems Department (2005-2006), she moved to Dartmouth College's Thayer School of Engineering in 2006 and became an assistant professor. In 2009, she received a CAREER Award from the National Science Foundation. In 2010, she returned to Brown, while retaining an adjunct assistant professor position at the Thayer School of Engineering until 2011 and Dartmouth's department of physics until 2012. She was promoted from assistant professor to associate professor in 2013. She moved to Northwestern University (where she had been a visiting scholar from 2014 to 2015) in 2017 and was promoted there to professor in 2020. At Northwestern, she has also been part of the Northwestern-Argonne Institute of Science and Engineering.

She and her research group investigate biological and physical systems through theoretical and experimental models. She teaches classes in fluid mechanics and biophysics, as well as in applied mathematics and vector calculus. In 2016, she was awarded the Humboldt Research Fellowship to work with the scientist Rumiana Dimova in the Department of Theory and Biosystems in the Max Planck Institute of Colloids and Interfaces. In 2019, she was elected Fellow of the American Physical Society for "pioneering work on problems in interfacial flows and soft matter, including the fluid-structure interaction in Stokes flow, the mechanics of biomembranes, and electrohydrodynamics." She was awarded a Guggenheim Fellowship in 2024; she intends to use the Fellowship to do research on the use of active fluids in cytological microbotics. In 2025, she was one of six engineers to receive a National Science Foundation TRAILBLAZER Award.
