= Nicole Rampersaud =

Canadian trumpeter and composer

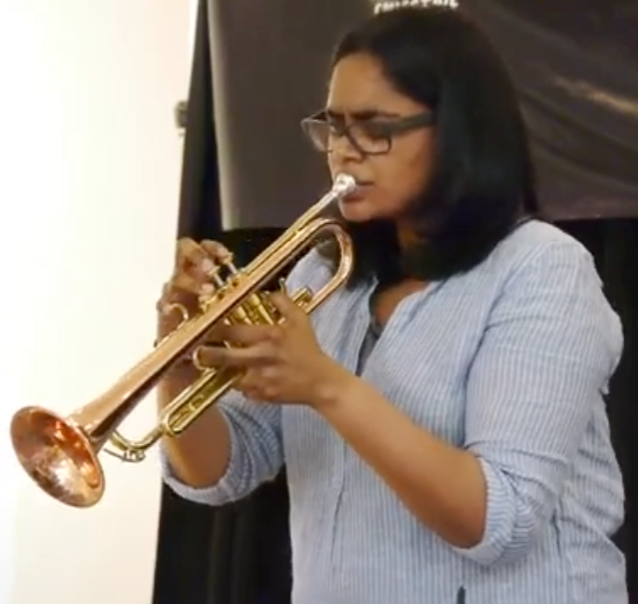
- At the Something Else! Festival in 2017
- Born: Toronto, Ontario, Canada
- Education: University of Toronto; New England Conservatory of Music
- Occupations: Trumpeter; composer
- Employer: Yorkville University
- Awards: Guggenheim Fellowship (2024)
- Musical career
- Genres: Jazz
- Instrument: Trumpet
- Formerly of: c_RL; Understory; Brass Knuckle Sandwich

Nicole Rampersaud is a Canadian trumpeter and composer. A 2024 Guggenheim Fellow, she has been a member of several bands, and her solo debut album Saudade was nominated for the 2024 East Coast Music Award for Instrumental Recording of the Year.

== Biography ==
Nicole Rampersaud was born in Toronto and raised there. She played trumpet for her school band and later "discovered her own musical interests through self-exploration in the university library". She attended the University of Toronto, where she graduated from the Jazz Performance Program, and the New England Conservatory of Music, where she was awarded a Master of Music degree in jazz performance in 2006.

She is founding trumpeter for the trio c_RL, formed in 2009. In 2019, she was the first composer-in-residence for the OBEY Convention. In 2021, she formed (with Parmela Attariwala and Germaine Liu) Understory, an improv project centered on virtual performance. She performed at the 2022 Guelph Jazz Festival. She also formed the duo Brass Knuckle Sandwich with pianist Marilyn Lerner, playing as trumpeter.

In November 2023, she released Saudade, her debut solo trumpet album from Ansible Editions; David Reed of The Intelligencer called it "a fearless and experimental expression that does not easily translate to description in written word". Saudade was nominated for the 2024 East Coast Music Award for Instrumental Recording of the Year, losing to Flying Pooka!'s The Ecstasy of Becoming. She, Liu, and Matana Roberts headlined the final act of the 2024 Women from Space festival. In 2024, she was awarded a Guggenheim Fellowship in Music Composition.

She works as associate director of admissions at Yorkville University.
