= Laura U. Marks =

Media scholar

Laura U. Marks is a philosopher and scholar of new media and film. She is the Grant Strate University Professor at Simon Fraser University (SFU). Previously, she was the Dana Wosk University Professor of Art and Cultural Studies at SFU. Among her theoretical contributions is the concept of haptic visuality, according to which a spectator's contact with media is conceived of as touching, as opposed to seeing. Marks is also a curator, and has developed exhibitions of Arab cinema.

== Publications ==
- Marks, Laura U. (2000). The Skin of the Film: Intercultural Cinema, Embodiment, and the Senses. Duke University Press. ISBN 0-8223-2358-3. OCLC 41273008.
- Marks, Laura U. (2002). Touch: Sensuous Theory and Multisensory Media. University of Minnesota Press. ISBN 0-8166-3888-8. OCLC 49626366.
- Marks, Laura U. (2010). Enfoldment and Unfinity: An Islamic Genealogy of New Media Art. MIT Press. ISBN 978-0-262-01421-2. OCLC 458583162.
- Marks, Laura U. (2015). Hanan al-Cinema: Affections for the Moving Image. MIT Press. ISBN 978-0-262-33107-4. OCLC 922529462.
- Marks, Laura U. (2024). The Fold: From Your Body to the Cosmos. Duke University Press ISBN 978-1-4780-3011-9
