= Lisa Elmaleh =

American visual artist

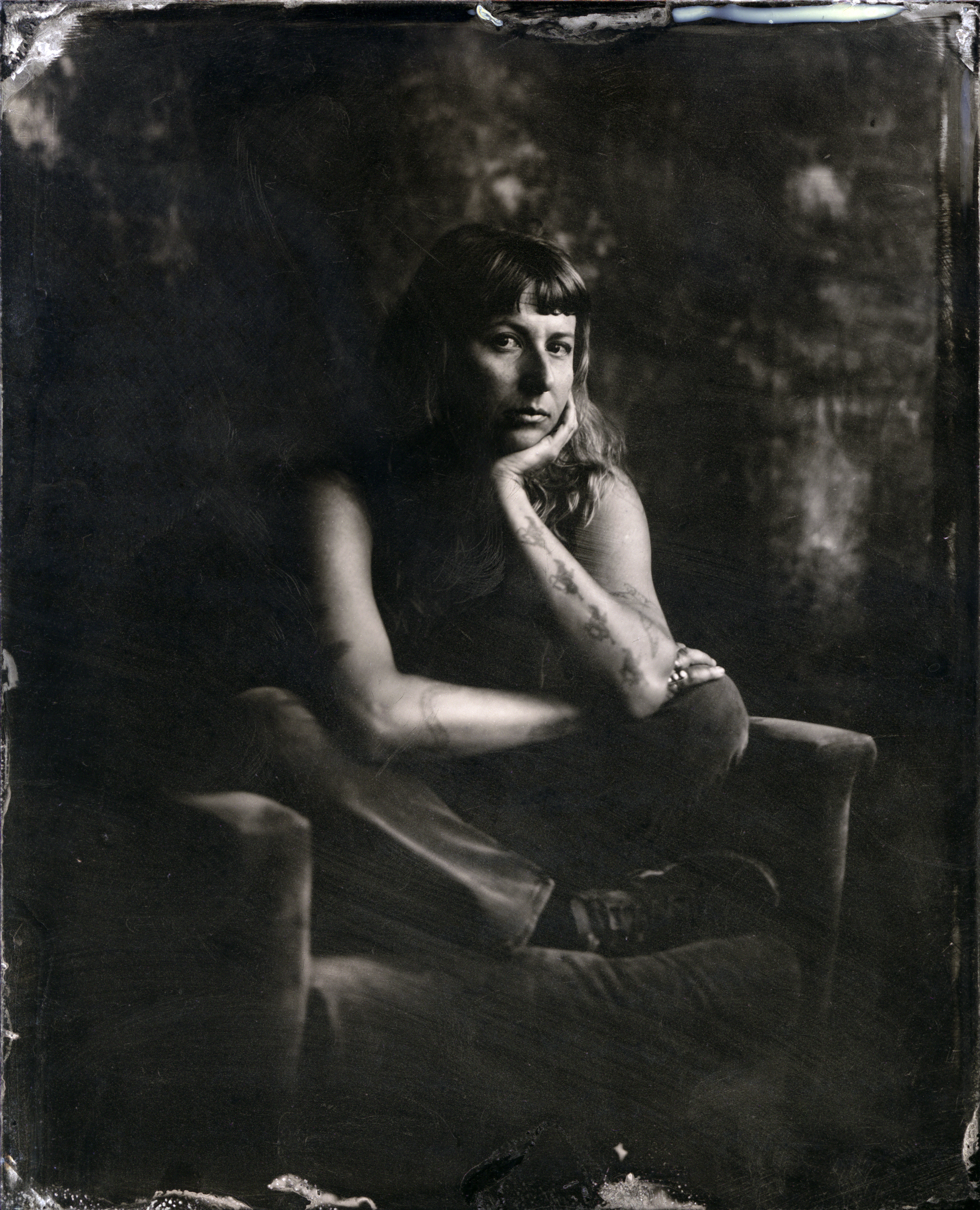
- Born: July 20, 1984 (age 42); Miami, Florida
- Citizenship: United States
- Education: BFA, School of Visual Arts
- Website: https://www.lisaelmaleh.com/

Lisa Elmaleh is an American visual artist, educator, and documentarian based in Hampshire County, West Virginia. She specializes in large-format photography using tintype, glass negative, and celluloid film. Since 2007, she has been traveling across the United States documenting American landscapes, life, and culture.

== Early life and education ==
Born in Miami, Florida 1984 Elmaleh grew up in a small apartment with her mother on a limited income. Her father was a photographer who worked with landscapes; Elmaleh recalls watching him develop photographs in a darkroom, saying "the magic of the images...stuck with me". She attended the School of Visual Arts in Manhattan, graduating with a Bachelor of Fine Arts in 2007.

=== Methods ===
Elmaleh creates tintype photographs, learning the collodion process in 2007. Her preferred camera is the Century Universal; she uses a Schneider Kreuznach 300mm lens. The wet collodion process means that images must be shot and developed while the chemicals are still wet on the plate. Many of her photographs focus on Appalachian folk musicians. She converted a Toyota Tacoma truck into a mobile darkroom—driving to meet her subjects. Because of the time constraints of the collodion process, Elmaleh develops the photographs within thirty minutes of taking them. Images are taken and developed one at a time.

=== Awards and honors ===
- 2010: Artist in Residence at Everglades National Park
- 2011: Won the Aaron Siskind Foundation IPF Grant
- 2012: Won the Ruth and Harold Chenven Foundation Grant
- 2013: Named one of Photo District News's "30 New And Emerging Photographers To Watch"
- 2015: Runner up for the Aperture Portfolio Prize
- 2022: Won the Arnold Newman Prize
- 2024: Guggenheim Fellowship

=== Works ===
Some of Elmaleh's works include:

- Everglades: a photo series of the natural environment of South Florida
- American Folk: a photo series of Appalachian folk musicians

== Personal life ==
She moved to Paw Paw, West Virginia from Brooklyn in 2014.
