= Henry Villierme =

American painter

- Born: August 21, 1928; San Francisco, CA
- Died: March 13, 2013 (aged 84)
- Known for: Painting
- Movement: Bay Area Figurative Movement, Abstract Expressionism, Pointillist, Cubist

Henry Pierre Villierme (August 21, 1928 – March 13, 2013) was an American Californian painter associated with abstract expressionism and the Bay Area Figurative Movement. Villierme was considered one of the "Second Generation" members of the Bay Area Figurative Movement. Villierme first rose to prominence with a series of successful exhibitions in the late 1950s. From the 1960s to the 1980s Villierme continued to paint and sculpt in his studio, and in the late 1980s returned to public exhibitions.

== Biography ==
Henry Villierme was born in San Francisco in 1928. His father, Louis Justin Henri Faustin Villierme (Tahiti, 1904 – San Francisco, 1967), was member of a French family from Lorient, Brittany, which had settled in Tahiti, French Polynesia, and who later moved to San Francisco. After the premature death of his mother Emilia, he was, together with his two younger brothers, entrusted to an aunt to raise him in his father's French family in Tahiti, French Polynesia; he returned to the Bay Area for his higher education in 1939. Henry Villierme spoke French due his paternal family origin.

Villierme served in the United States Army in the Korean War, as a medic on the front line, and he was awarded the Bronze Star by the United States Army in 1951. Upon returning to the United States and discharge from the Army, he enrolled in the California College of Arts and Crafts under the G.I. Bill.

In Oakland, at the California College of Arts & Crafts, he met Barbara Albers in 1953, and they married in 1954. They raised four children, Frank, Julianne, Paul and Claudia. They moved to Southern California in the late fifties, where they stayed, living successively in Hermosa Beach, then in Ojai. Henry died on March 13, 2013.

== Artwork ==
Villierme credited his initial interest in art to "working in a paint store and working out interior color schemes". He also credited his time in the Far East, where he was excited by the look of Japan, as well as "the concern for art values" that was part of the Japanese people's way of life."

At the California College of Arts and Crafts Villierme studied under David Park, Harry Krell, Elmer Bischoff, and Richard Diebenkorn, the latter having commented on Henry Villierme's “instinctual understanding” of the art of painting.

Outside of the Bay Area Figurative Movement, one of Henry Villierme's early influences at CCAC was the Japanese American abstractionist and abstract calligrapher Saburo Hasegawa. Villierme graduated from CCAC with a Bachelor's Degree in Painting. Villierme also took several courses at the California School of Fine Arts (San Francisco Art Institute), where his peers included Robert Downs, Manuel Neri, and Bruce McGaw.

Villierme's art showed promise early on. In August 1957 Villierme won Second Award at the Jack London Square Art Festival for his painting "Highway". In November, his painting "Lake View" took First Place at the 7th Annual Exhibition Oil and Sculpture at the Richmond Art Center, with honorable mentions going to Richard Diebenkorn, Nathan Oliveira, and David Park.

Villierme was invited to display in "The Next Direction", an exhibition sponsored by the Oakland Art Museum and which also featured works by McGaw, Park, Bischoff, and Diebenkorn. He later went on to win a prize aware at the Los Angeles County Museum 1958 Annual Exhibition – Artists of Los Angeles and Vicinity, for his piece "Landscape". Villierme's works were also featured in exhibitions at the M.H. de Young Memorial Museum and the San Francisco Museum of Art.

Villierme's work is typically realistic, and his most frequent subjects are great rolling landscapes typical of California's Central Valley. He is also known for his portraits and still lifes, which are generally done on smaller, one-square-foot canvases. He worked from sketches he made on the spot, which he put aside for a month or more before he painted from them. His approach is often considered pointillist and cubist. In 1992, Richard Diebenkorn said of Villierme, "(Villierme's) painting had, and still has, instinctual understanding of that universal human activity in which colors are applied to a surface."

In the late 1950s Henry Villierme and his wife left the Bay Area for Southern California to raise their family. Richard Diebenkorn later said, responding to Villierme's decision, "Of all the painting students at the California College of Arts and Crafts who might have abandoned his direction, Henry was one whose defection could hit me the hardest."

In the late 1980s Villierme began a comeback that culminated with the 2005 Bay Area Figurative 1950s and 1960s exhibit at the Bolinas Museum in Bolinas, California.

== Exhibitions ==
Jack London Square Art Festival. August 1957. Oakland, CA. "Highway" (Second Award).

California College of Arts and Crafts 50th Anniversary. M.H. de Young Memorial Museum. San Francisco, CA.

7th Annual Exhibition Oil and Sculpture at the Richmond Art Center. November 1–30, 1957. Richmond, CA. "Lake View" (First Place).

Seventy Sixth Annual Painting and Sculpture Exhibition of the San Francisco Art Association. February 28 - March 31, 1957. San Francisco, CA. "House Tops"

The Next Direction. The Oakland Art Museum. June 8 – 30, 1957. Oakland, CA.

Contemporary Bay Area Figurative Painting Exhibition. The Oakland Art Museum. September 1957. Oakland, CA. "Highway Study".

Seventy-Seventh Annual Painting and Sculpture Exhibition of the San Francisco Art Association. May 1958. San Francisco, CA. "Landscape" .

Contemporary Bay Area Figurative Paintings. Los Angeles County Museum. Los Angeles, CA

1958 Annual Exhibition – Artists of Los Angeles and Vicinity. Los Angeles County Museum. May 21 – June 29, 1958. Los Angeles, CA. "Landscape" (Prize Award)

Brookshire Square Invitational Art Exhibition. Downey Museum of Art, May, 1966. Donwey, CA.

Bay Area Figurative 1950s and 1960s. Bolinas Museum. April 29 – June 18, 2006. Bolinas, CA.
