= Roland Petersen =

Danish-born American painter, printmaker, and professor (born 1926)

- Born: March 31, 1926 (age 100); Endelave, Denmark
- Education: California School of Fine Arts, Hans Hoffman School of Fine Arts, California College of Arts and Crafts, Atelier 17
- Alma mater: University of California at Berkeley
- Occupations: painter, printmaker, professor
- Employer(s): University of California, Davis, Washington State University
- Movement: Bay Area Figurative Movement

Roland Conrad Petersen (born March 31, 1926) is a Danish-born American painter, printmaker, and professor. His career spans over 50 years, primarily in the San Francisco Bay Area and is perhaps best-known for his "Picnic series" (a yearly event at UC Davis) beginning in 1959 to today. He is part of the Bay Area Figurative Movement.

== Early life and education ==
Petersen was born 1926 in Endelave, Denmark. He received a B.A. in 1949 and M.A. degree in 1950 from the University of California at Berkeley (UC Berkeley), where he studied under Chiura Obata, John Haley, and Glen Wessels. He continued his studies at California School of Fine Arts (now known as San Francisco Art Institute), the Hans Hofmann School of Fine Arts in Provincetown (from 1950 to 1951), California College of Arts and Crafts (1952 to 1954), and Atelier 17 with Stanley Hayter (from 1963, and 1970 to 1971).

After graduation college in 1950, Petersen made his way east to study with Hans Hoffman School of Fine Arts in Provincetown. Roland would return again the following summer of 1951 after a sojourn in Europe studying for six months with the printmaker Stanley William Hayter. Vestiges of Hofmann's approach, including his conviction that "every deep artistic expression is a product of a conscious feeling for reality," are present in Petersen's works of the early 1950s. It was Hoffman's teaching that showed Petersen how to incorporate "recognizable, everyday objects into this theory of opposition push/pull" a theory, which stresses the applying and combining of opposing forces in art.

== Teaching and career ==
He taught painting at Washington State University from 1956 to 1992; and painting and printmaking at University of California, Davis from 1956 to 1991.

He won a Guggenheim Fellowship in 1963; and a Fulbright Fellowship to France in 1970.

In March 2010, Petersen's work was the subject of a major retrospective ("Roland Petersen: 50 Years of Painting") held at the Monterey Museum of Art in Monterey, California. Petersen, his daughter, and his wife, the photographer Caryl Ritter, were present. In 2016 a one man show In Perspective was held at his current gallery The Studio Shop Gallery in Burlingame, California, and again on September 22 – October 15, 2017—the show is called Six Decades of Painting—resulting in a bound book of Petersen's work under the same title.

Roland Petersen was a part of the Bay Area Figurative Movement—a mid-20th Century art movement made up of a group of artists in the San Francisco Bay Area who abandoned working in the prevailing style of Abstract Expressionism in favor of a return to figuration in painting during the 1950s and onward into the 1960s. The "Bridge Generation" (the second of three generations) included the artists Roland Petersen, Nathan Oliveira, Theophilus Brown, Paul Wonner, John Hultberg, and Frank Lobdell.

== Collections ==
- Davis Arts Center, Davis, California
- Manetti Shrem Museum of Art, Davis, California
- Hirshhorn Museum and Sculpture Garden, Washington, D.C.
- Fine Arts Museums of San Francisco, (Achenbach Foundation for Graphic Arts), San Francisco, California
- Virginia Museum of Fine Arts, Richmond, Virginia
- Crocker Art Museum, Sacramento, California
- University of Nevada, Reno, Nevada
- Wesleyan University School of Art, Bloomington, Illinois
- Long Beach Museum of Art, Long Beach, California
- Sacramento City College, Sacramento, California
- Fine Arts Gallery of San Diego, San Diego, California
- Monterey Museum of Art, Monterey, California
- Musée Municipal, Brest, France
- Museum of Contemporary Art, San Diego, California
- Oakland Museum of California, Oakland, California
- Philadelphia Museum of Art, Philadelphia, Pennsylvania
- Phoenix Art Museum, Phoenix, Arizona
- San Francisco Museum of Modern Art (SFMoMA), San Francisco, California
- De Young Museum, San Francisco, California
- Santa Barbara Museum of Art, Santa Barbara, California
- Museum of Modern Art (MoMA), New York City, New York
- Whitney Museum of American Art, New York City, New York

== Selected solo exhibitions ==
2017 Roland Petersen: Six Decades of Painting, Studio Shop Gallery, Burlingame, CA 2016 Roland Petersen: In Perspective, Studio Shop Gallery, Burlingame, CA 2015 Works On Paper 1959–1969, Elliott Fouts Gallery, Sacramento, CA 2013 A Journey Through Time, Elliott Fouts Gallery, Sacramento, CA 2008 Roland Petersen: A Natural Order, Hackett-Freedman Gallery, San Francisco, CA 2002 Roland Petersen: Early Paintings 1958-–1969, Hackett-Freedman Gallery, San Francisco, CA 2001 Roland Petersen: Recent Works, John Natsoulas Gallery, Sacramento, CA 1998 Roland Petersen: Recent Works, John Natsoulas Gallery, Sacramento, CA 1998 Endelave Museum, Endelave, Denmark (traveled throughout Denmark) 1995 Roland Petersen: Recent Works, Maxwell Galleries, San Francisco, CA 1993 Roland Petersen: Works on Paper, Harcourts Modern and Contemporary Art, San Francisco, CA 1992 Retrospective, University of California, Davis, Richard L. Nelson Gallery, University of California, Davis, CA 1991 Roland Petersen: Works on Paper, Harcourts Modern and Contemporary Art, San Francisco, CA 1990 Roland Petersen: Bay Area Paintings of the Sixties, Vanderwoude Tananbaum Gallery, New York, NY 1989 Roland Petersen: Works on Paper, Harcourts Modern and Contemporary Art, San Francisco, CA 1987 Roland Petersen—Bay Area Paintings of the Sixties, Vanderwoude/Tananbaum Gallery, New York, NY 1985 Roland Petersen: Encaustic Paintings, Rorick Gallery, San Francisco, CA 1984 Roland Petersen: Selected Monotypes & Watercolors, Smith Andersen Gallery, Palo Alto, CA 1981–83 Roland Petersen: Encaustic Paintings, Rorick Gallery, San Francisco, CA 1980 University of Reading, Reading, England 1979 Brubaker Gallery, Sarasota, FL 1978 Roland Petersen Retrospective, University of California, Davis, Memorial Union Art Gallery, University of California, Davis, CA 1977 Aberbach Fine Arts Gallery, London, England. Kathryn Markel Gallery, New York, NY. University of Reading, Reading, England 1976 20 Year Retrospective of Color Prints by Roland Petersen, Washington State Art Services Program (traveling, organized by the Museum of Art), Pullman, WA 1975 Adele Bednarz Gallery, Los Angeles, CA 1973 Santa Barbara Museum of Art, Santa Barbara, CA. Adele Bednarz Gallery, Los Angeles, CA 1972 Phoenix Art Museum, Phoenix, AZ 1970 Adele Bednarz Gallery, Los Angeles, CA 1968 M.H. de Young Memorial Museum, San Francisco, CA 1967 Staempfli Gallery, New York, NY (also 1965, 1962) 1965 Crocker Art Museum, Sacramento, CA 1961 Esther-Robles Gallery, Los Angeles, CA 1961 California Palace of the Legion of Honor, San Francisco, CA 1954 Oakland Museum of California, Oakland, CA

Selected Group Exhibitions 2016 Out Our Way, Manetti Shrem Museum of Art, Davis, CA 2002 Geometry Hackett-Freedman Gallery, San Francisco, CA 2001 California Printmakers Association: Group Exhibition, Marin Civic Center, San Rafael, CA 1995 Andre Milan Gallery, Sao Paulo, Brazil 1993 Artists Contemporary Gallery, Sacramento, CA Pence Gallery, Davis, CA 1992–93 California Painting, The Essential Modernist Framework, Fine Art, CA State University, Los Angeles, CA; Traveled to University Art Gallery, California State University, San Bernardino, CA 1992 Hall of Pictures, Uman, Russia California Dreamin', Fresno Metropolitan Museum, Fresno, CA 1990 Northern California Figuration, Natsoulas, Novelozo, Davis, CA 1989 Collectors Exhibit, Sacramento City College, Sacramento, CA 1985 Sacramento/Davis Interface, Richmond Art Center, Richmond, CA 1984–86 Prints U.S.A., First overseas exhibition by the California Society of Printmakers: World Print Council, San Francisco, CA; Traveled to the National Museum, Singapore; National Gallery, Bangkok, Thailand; Amerika Haus, Berlin, Germany; Malmo Konsthall, Malmo, Sweden; Museo de Arte Carrillo Gil, Mexico 1980 The Collectors Eye, Laguna Beach Museum of Art, Laguna Beach, CA; Traveled to Aberbach Gallery, London, England 1977–78 Atelier 17 Exhibition, Elvehjem Art Center, University of Wisconsin, Madison, WI; traveled to Museum of Art, University of Iowa, Iowa City, IA; Brooklyn Museum of Art, Brooklyn, NY; Museum of Art, University of Michigan, Ann Arbor, MI; Krannert Art Museum, University of Illinois at Urbana-Champaign, Champaign, IL; Aberbach Fine Arts Gallery, London, England; Kathryn Markel Gallery, New York, NY 1972 The American Artist and Water Reclamation, National Gallery of Art, Washington, DC 1971 Four-Person Exhibition, American Cultural Center, Paris, France 1969 The Illinois Biennial, Krannert Art Museum, University of Illinois at Urbana Champaign, Champaign, IL 1968 The Humanist Tradition with David Park in Contemporary American Painting, New York School, New York, NY. Four Person Exhibition with David Park, Elmer Bischoff and Joan Brown, Bednarz and Heritage Gallery, Los Angeles, CA 1966 Contemporary American Artists in the White House, White House, Washington, DC 1964 Painting and Sculpture Today, Herron Museum of Art, Indianapolis, IN 1962 68th Denver Annual, Denver Art Museum, Denver, CO 1961 National Watercolor Exhibition, Peoria, IL 1960 First Winter Invitational, California Palace of the Legion of Honor, San Francisco, CA 1956 San Francisco Art Association Invitational, M.H. De Young Memorial Museum, San Francisco, CA 1955 Second Oil Annual, Seattle Art Museum, Seattle, WA 1954 San Francisco Art Annual, San Francisco Museum of Art, San Francisco, CA 1951 Atelier 17, New York, NY. American Painters, Florence, Italy. Young Painters, Beaux Gallery, Paris, France 1950 National College Exhibition, Andover, MA
