= Theophilus Brown =

American artist (1919–2012)

- Born: William Theophilus Brown; April 7, 1919; Moline, Illinois
- Died: February 8, 2012 (aged 92); San Francisco, California
- Known for: Visual Arts
- Movement: Bay Area Figurative Movement
- Spouse: Paul Wonner (domestic partner)

William Theophilus Brown (April 7, 1919 – February 8, 2012) was an American artist. He became prominent as a member of the Bay Area Figurative Movement.

== Background and career ==
A descendant of early-American intellectuals, Brown was born in Moline, Illinois. His great-grandfather was friends with Ralph Waldo Emerson and Henry David Thoreau. Brown's father was an inventor and chief designer at the John Deere Company in Moline, Illinois. While attending Yale University in the late-1930s, Brown met composer Paul Hindemith and poet May Sarton, with whom he would share lifetime friendships. After graduating in 1941, Brown was drafted in World War II. Following his discharge, he began to study painting, moving between New York City and Paris, meeting an impressive range of artists that included Picasso, Braque, Giacometti, Balthus, and de Kooning, among others. Brown, who studied piano at Yale, was also close to a number of composers, including John Cage, Francis Poulenc, Samuel Barber, and Igor Stravinsky.

In 1952 Brown enrolled in the graduate studio program at the University of California, Berkeley, joining a group of artists—including Richard Diebenkorn, David Park, Elmer Bischoff, James Weeks, and Nathan Oliveira — that would later be known as the Bay Area Figurative Movement. While attending Berkeley, Brown also met and fell in love with his long-time partner and fellow-painter Paul Wonner.

In the early 1960s, Brown and Wonner moved to Santa Monica, where they developed a close friendship with fellow gay couple, novelist Christopher Isherwood and portrait artist Don Bachardy. Over the years, Brown and Wonner also fostered friendships with playwright William Inge, composer and conductor André Previn, actress Eva Marie Saint and her husband, director Jeffrey Hayden, and New Zealand novelist Janet Frame.

In his later years, Brown still managed to paint daily. Theophilus Brown resided in San Francisco, California at the time of his death.

His papers are held at the Archives of American Art.

Four months before his death, Brown gave an interview on YouTube in which he fact-checked his Wikipedia entry. He found the entry accurate, on the whole, but termed his classification as an abstract expressionist "horseshit." He died in San Francisco, aged 92.

== Selected collections ==
- Oakland Museum of California

== Exhibitions ==
2011

- Minnesota Marine Art Museum

2005

- Sacramento State University

1996

- Stanford Art Gallery

== Sources ==
- Jones, Caroline A., Bay Area Figurative Art 1950-1956, Berkeley, University of California Press, 1990.
- Arthur, John., Theophilus Brown: Paintings, Collages and Drawings, Chesterfield: Chameleon, 2007, ISBN 978-0-915829-75-0
- McCarthy, David, "Social Nudism, Masculinity, and the Male Nude in the Work of William Theo Brown and Wynn Chamberlain in the 1960s", Archives of American Art Journal 38, nos. 1–2 (1998), 28–38
