= Adelie Landis Bischoff =

American artist (1926–2019)

- Born: Adelie Landis; February 12, 1926; Brooklyn, New York City, New York (state), United States
- Died: July 23, 2019; Berkeley, California, United States
- Education: Mount Sinai Nursing School, California School of Fine Arts, University of California, Berkeley
- Occupation: Visual artist
- Years active: 1950s – 2010s
- Spouse: Elmer Bischoff (m. 1962–1991; death)

Adelie Landis Bischoff (February 12, 1926 – July 23, 2019), was an American artist and painter, active in the San Francisco Bay Area. She was the wife of artist Elmer Bischoff.

== Early life ==
Adelie Landis was born and raised in Brooklyn, the daughter of Alexander Landis and Eva Paris Landis. She trained as a nurse at Mount Sinai Nursing School (now Mount Sinai Phillips School of Nursing) in the 1940s. She studied fine arts at the California School of Fine Arts (now San Francisco Art Institute), in 1951 and 1952, working with Elmer Bischoff, David Park, and Hassel Smith. She earned a master of fine arts degree in painting at the University of California, Berkeley in 1959.

== Career ==
Adelie Landis worked as a psychiatric nurse at McLean Hospital from 1947 to 1948, before she moved to California to pursue a career in art. Landis Bischoff was considered an artist of the San Francisco Abstract Expressionist movement, but she also worked in the Bay Area Figurative Movement. "I never got into the drip and blob," she later said of expressionism. "I think it took more nerve than I had at the time." Landis Bischoff's work was exhibited in San Francisco and New York in 2006, in Belmont in 2012, and included in a 2014 show, "Beauty Fierce as Stars, Groundbreaking Women Painters 1950s and Beyond" in Berkeley, California.

Landis Bischoff's home was burned in the Oakland firestorm of 1991. The fire destroyed thousands of her and her late husband's drawings, photographs, notebooks, and diaries. "It was a kind of epiphany. I felt a surge of freedom to just leave it, to walk out and leave everything," she recalled later. She built a new home in Oakland, designed by architect Stanley Saitowitz, and continued painting and exhibiting new works into her late eighties.

== Personal life and legacy ==
Adelie Landis married fellow artist Elmer Nelson Bischoff in 1962. Their son, David Bischoff, became a sculptor and writer. She was widowed when Elmer died from cancer in 1991; she died in 2019, aged 93 years, in Berkeley.

Works by Adelie Landis Bischoff are held in the collections of the San Francisco Museum of Modern Art, the Library of Congress, Bryn Mawr College, and the University of California Art Museum.
