= Robert Qualters =

American painter

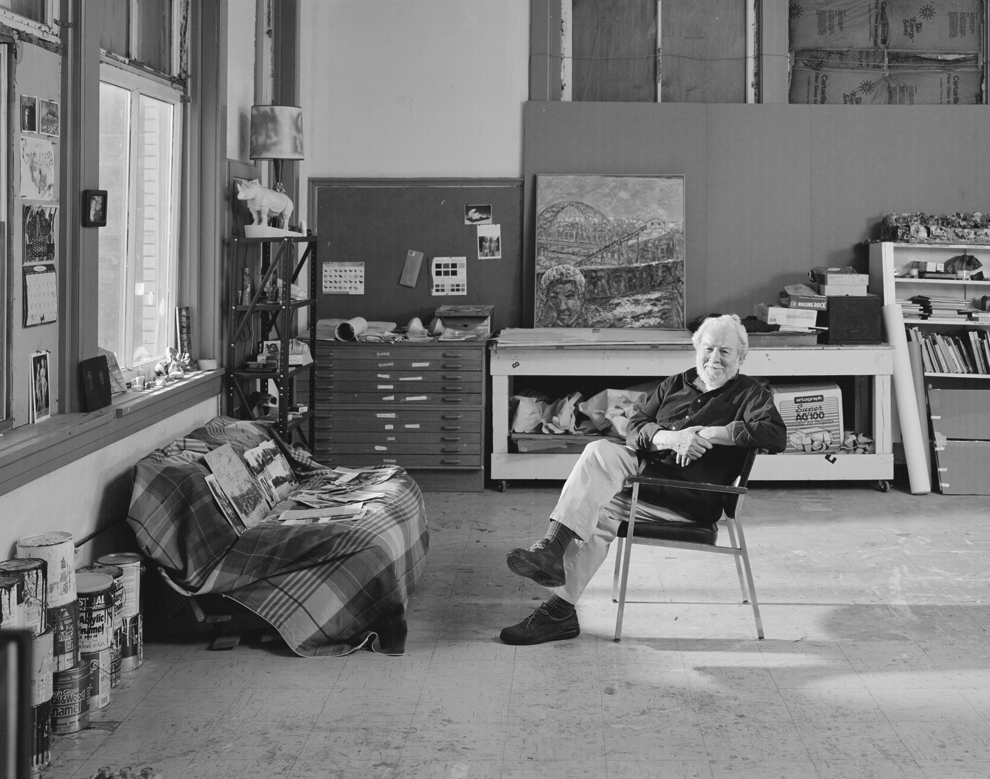
- Photograph by Mark Perrott of artist Robert Qualters in his Homestead, PA studio.
- Born: Robert L. Qualters, Jr. March 13, 1934 (age 92); McKeesport, Pennsylvania
- Education: Carnegie Institute of Technology (now Carnegie Mellon University), California College of Arts and Crafts, Syracuse University
- Known for: Painting, Printmaking, Installation
- Movement: Bay Area Figurative Movement of Representational Painting

Robert L. Qualters, Jr. (born March 13, 1934) is an American painter, installation artist and printmaker based in Pittsburgh, Pennsylvania. His work encompasses traditional painting, as well as murals, and collaborations with other Pittsburgh-based artists across several disciplines. He is associated with the Bay Area Figurative Movement of Representational Painting.

== Early life ==
Qualters was born in McKeesport, Pennsylvania and grew up in Clairton, Pennsylvania. His mother was a schoolteacher and his father a county assessor. He has two sisters, Priscilla and Margaret.

== Education, military, and teaching ==
Qualters graduated from Clairton High School in 1951 and enrolled in Carnegie Institute of Technology (now Carnegie Mellon University) as an art major. At Carnegie Tech, he studied with Robert Lepper who once taught fellow Pittsburghers Philip Pearlstein and Andy Warhol. In 1953, Qualters joined the army, serving the following two years as an artilleryman in England. He returned to Pittsburgh in 1955 and spent one more year at Carnegie Tech.

Qualters moved to California in 1956 on the G.I. Bill and enrolled in the California College of Arts and Crafts in Oakland. He earned a B.F.A. there, while becoming immersed in the fledgling Bay Area Figurative Movement of Representational Painting. At California College, his mentors included the painters Nathan Oliveira and Richard Diebenkorn—founding members of the Bay Area Figurative Movement—and the calligrapher Sabro Hasegawa. It was Diebenkorn who, in 1957, invited Qualters to be in the first Bay Area Figurative show.

Qualters returned to Pittsburgh in 1959. From 1962–1968, he taught at the State University of New York at Oswego, while completing an M.F.A. at Syracuse University in 1965. He settled in Pittsburgh permanently in 1968. Since then, he has taught at the University of Pittsburgh, Carlow College, Slippery Rock State University, Indiana University of Pennsylvania, West Virginia University, and Carnegie Mellon University. He has also been an Artist-in-Residence at the Pittsburgh High School for the Creative and Performing Arts.

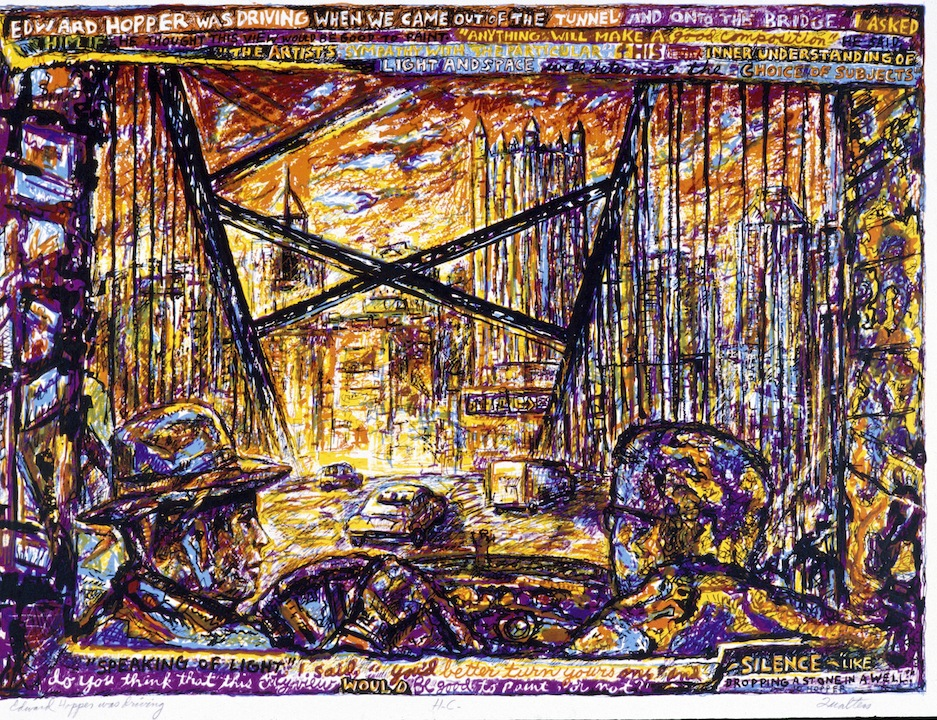
Edward Hopper Was Driving from Lessons of the Masters, 1997

== Work ==
Qualters is known for his vivid, color-saturated depictions of Pittsburgh's neighborhoods, bridges, and steel mills as well as self-portraits. Qualters has also created original works alongside poets Jan McReery and Gail Ghai; mixed media and tattoo artist Nick Bubash; photographers Charlee Brodsky and Mark Perrott, and other Pittsburgh-based artists. With scenic designer Tony Ferrieri, Qualters designed and painted the set for the City Theatre of Pittsburgh's 1996–97 production of “Below the Belt.”

Qualters has exhibited in Pennsylvania, as well as in New York, California, Maine, and West Virginia. In Pittsburgh, he has had solo-artist shows at Borelli Edwards, Concept Art Gallery, Carson Street Gallery, the Carnegie Museum of Art, the Pittsburgh Center for the Arts, and many other galleries and museums. A 2008 retrospective at the Rivers of Steel National Heritage Area in Homestead featured works from a 20-year span, 1980–2000, highlighting the end of the industrial age in the Monongahela Valley through firsthand observation and through what Rivers of Steel Director Ronald Baraff calls "the lens of the people". His work is represented in the permanent collections of the Carnegie Museum of Art; the Oakland Museum of California; and the Westmoreland County Museum of American Art in Greensburg, Pennsylvania; as well as in the main offices of PPG Industries, Alcoa, Hillman Company, The Pittsburgh Foundation, The Heinz Endowments, and many other corporations, schools, and government agencies, and private collections throughout Southwestern Pennsylvania.

Qualters' work has also been seen in more than two-dozen public murals and site-specific installations around the city. Besides commissions from Mercy Hospital of Pittsburgh, the Western Pennsylvania School for Blind Children, Pittsburgh's Three Rivers Arts Festival, Oxford Development Company and others, he has created more than a dozen murals with high school students between 1986 and 1988 and as recently as 2005. His work with these students, like his numerous collaborations with prominent Pittsburgh artists, reflects a passion to create, as well as to teach, learn, and discover.

Aside from Diebenkorn and other Bay Area colorists, his influences include Brueghel, Rembrandt, Matisse, and fellow Pittsburgh artist John Kane. Many of his works include references or homages to these artists.

== Awards and recognition ==
A past president of both the Associated Artists of Pittsburgh and Artists Equity of Pittsburgh, Qualters is the Pittsburgh Center for the Arts' 1985 Artist of the Year, one of the many honors bestowed on him over six decades of work. In addition to local grants and commissions, he has received funding to work in France and was a visiting artist at the American Academy in Rome. Along with countless reviews and feature stories in local press, his work has been published in American Artist, The Pittsburgh That Starts Within You, Carnegie Magazine, Pittsburgh Quarterly, and the Pratt Institute's Artists Proof.

On March 11, 2014, the Pittsburgh City Council presented Robert Qualters with an official City Proclamation.

On July 24, 2014, Pennsylvania's First Lady, Susan Corbett, announced Robert Qualters as the Pennsylvania Artist of the Year at the Pennsylvania Governor's Arts Awards 2014.

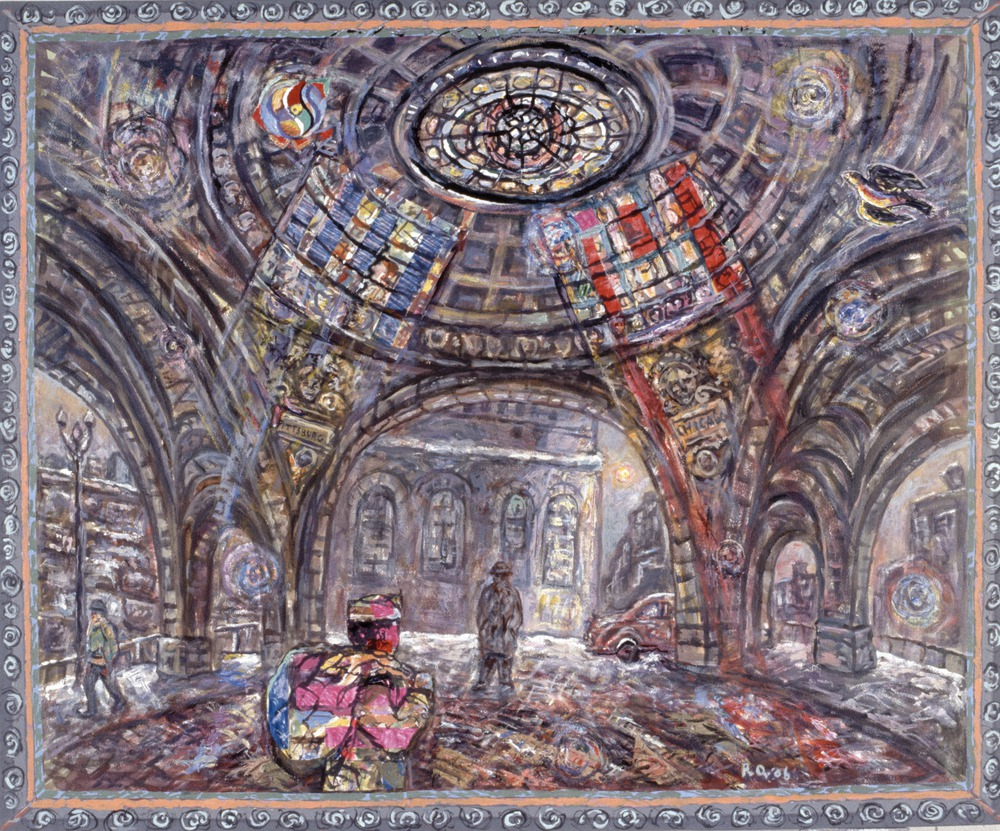
Penn Station Rotunda, 2006

== Personal life ==
Qualters lives in the Squirrel Hill neighborhood of Pittsburgh and works in Homestead. His wife of 46 years, the former Joanne Ricchi of Oswego, New York, passed in 2010. The Qualters have two sons: Robert Qualters III of Florida and Brett Qualters of Montana.

== Other ==
In 2014, three concurrent projects—a biography, a documentary film, and a 40-year retrospective—celebrate Qualters' life and work. The University of Pittsburgh Press published Robert Qualters: Autobiographical Mythologies by author, historian, and curator Vicky A. Clark, PhD of Clarion University in January; With Pittsburgh Filmmakers, filmmakers Joe and Elizabeth Seamans released Bob Qualters: The Artist in Action; and from February 7 through April 20, the Pittsburgh Center for the Arts in Shadyside ran Robert Qualters: 40 Years Paintings, Drawings, and Prints.
