= James Weeks (artist) =

American artist

- Born: December 1, 1922; Oakland, California
- Died: January 3, 1998 (aged 75); Boston, Massachusetts
- Movement: Bay Area Figurative Movement
- Spouse: Lynn Williams Weeks

James Darrell Northrup Weeks (December 1, 1922 – January 3, 1998) was an American artist and an early member of the Bay Area Figurative Movement. Unlike many artists in the movement, Weeks was never known for painting in a non-representational style, instead using abstraction in the "ideas of painting." He further diverged from his colleagues in the rigidity of his figures, a characteristic that Anita Ventura described as "[painting] not for expression so much as comprehension."

== Life ==
James Darrell Northrup Weeks was born on December 1, 1922, in Oakland, California to Anson Weeks and Ruth Daly, both musicians. Weeks graduated from Lowell High School in 1940 and enrolled at the California School of Fine Arts. In 1943, Weeks enlisted in the US Air Force, returning to CSFA in 1946 following the end of World War II. In the following years, Weeks studied with William Gaw and David Park at CSFA and attended Marian Hartwell's school of design.

Weeks graduated from CSFA in 1947, joining the faculty soon after. Two years later, Weeks married Lynn Williams Weeks.

In the following years Weeks taught at both CSFA and California College of Arts and Crafts, which together included a number of notable faculty including Richard Diebenkorn. While teaching, Weeks worked at a sandwich factory in order to supplement his primary income.

In the summer of 1952, Weeks studied at Escuela de Pintura y Escultura in Mexico City on G.I. Bill benefits.

In 1967, Weeks and his family moved to Los Angeles and joined Diebenkorn on the University of California Los Angeles faculty.

Weeks moved to Boston in 1970, serving on the faculty of the art department of Boston University until his 1987 retirement.
