= Bruce McGaw =

Bruce Alanson McGaw (April 5, 1935 – March 22, 2025) was an American painter and educator. He is part of the Bay Area Figurative Movement, and was professor emeritus of the San Francisco Art Institute. He studied in the 1950's at the California College of the Arts with Richard Diebenkorn and others.

== Background ==
Bruce Alanson McGaw was born in Berkeley, California on April 5, 1935, and was raised in Albany, California. He graduated from Albany High School in 1949. He studied with Fred Martin while in high school.

In 1955, at age 18, McGaw attended classes at California College of Arts and Crafts (now the California College of the Arts) in Oakland, and was in the institution’s first class taught by Richard Diebenkorn. He also studied with Leon Goldin, Sabro Hasegawa, Carol Purdie and Ralph Siegel. He graduated with honors in 1957 with a BFA degree.

By 1957, McGaw had increasingly focused on representational work and the depiction of the human figure, a focus that would define his practice for the next fifty years. This dynamic observational approach was influenced by the vitality of other Bay Area Figurative artists active during this period, such as David Park (painter) and Elmer Bischoff.

McGaw died on March 22, 2025, at the age of 89.

== Studio and teaching practice ==
In describing his relationship to teaching and his own painting practice McGaw states, "Painting is one of the oldest of human activities and remains vital and essential. Its wonder is related to the challenges and difficulties of its physical limitations, its constrained format and fixed facture, always totally present, a poetry of sight. Painting taps the deepest and most considered resources of its maker."

McGaw's work consists largely of medium to large-scale oil paintings and charcoal drawings featuring human figures, still lives of vignettes found often in his studio, and landscapes capturing the light of the San Francisco Bay Area cast on the mixed industrial and working-class suburbs of East Bay towns like Emeryville, California. An avid student of art history and poetry, he cites significant texts and relationships with colleagues among the most important influences in his studio practice.

McGaw continued to paint and draw in the studio he built in 1990 in the Richmond hills, California.

== Teaching ==
- San Francisco Art Institute, San Francisco, CA – Professor, Painting & Drawing (all levels), Painting & Sculpture MFA seminars, Art History - 1957–2017
- Bowling Green State University, Bowling Green, Ohio – Visiting Artist - 1998
- Stanford University, Palo Alto, CA – Fall semester 1984
- University of California, Berkeley, CA School of Architecture, Spring quarter 1981–1983
- Pacific Basin School of Textile Arts, Berkeley, CA – Summer 1978
- Fort Wright College, Spokane, Washington – Visiting Artists - Fall 1973
- Neighborhood Art Workshop, North Richmond, Contra Costa County, CA – Summer 1967
- Palo Alto Art Club, Palo Alto, CA – 1960–61

== Exhibitions ==
- Bruce McGaw Paintings, Fresno Museum of Art, Fresno, CA, 2009
- Bruce McGaw Paintings, Walter and McBean Galleries, San Francisco Art Institute, San Francisco, CA, 2008
- Group Show – University Library Gallery, CSU Sacramento, Sacramento, CA, 2005
- Bruce McGaw: A Survey of Fifty Years, John Natsoulas Gallery, Davis, CA, 2004
- Group Show - John Natsoulas Gallery, Davis, CA, 2002
- Bruce McGaw Early Paintings, John Bergruen Gallery, San Francisco, CA, 2000
- Mural – Chylinski Building, Los Angeles, 1998
- Group Show – Robert Ariele Fine Arts, Menlo Park, Group Show, 1996
- Group Show - John Natsoulas Gallery, Davis, CA 1996
- Faculty Exhibition, San Francisco Art Institute, San Francisco, CA, 1995
- Pier 23 Cafe, San Francisco, CA, 1991
- Lyrical Vision: The 6 Gallery 1954-1957 – Natsoulas/Novelozo Gallery, Davis, CA, 1990
- Group Show – Natsoulas/Novelozo Gallery, Davis, CA, 1990
- Group Show - Rena Bransten Gallery, San Francisco, CA 1990
- One Person Show - Claypoole Freeze Gallery, Pacific Grove, CA 1990
- Bay Area Figurative Art – San Francisco Museum of Modern Art, San Francisco, CA, 1989
- One Person Show – Charles Campbell Gallery, San Francisco, CA, 1984
- Courtside Tennis Club, Los Gatos, CA, 1977
- Private Studio Exhibition - 363 Clementina Street, San Francisco, CA, 1974
- Drawing Invitational - Oakland Museum of Art, Oakland, CA, 1973
- Private Studio Exhibition - 363 Clementina Street, San Francisco, CA, 1973
- Drawing Invitational - San Francisco Art Institute, San Francisco, CA, 1973
- Four Person Show (with David Hannah, Jack Jefferson and Joe Oddo) - Oakland Museum of Art, Oakland, CA, 1970
- Solo Drawing Exhibition - San Francisco Art Institute, San Francisco, CA, 1969
- Solo Exhibit - Trinity University Art Gallery, San Antonio, Texas, 1967
- Solo Exhibit - Derby Street Gallery, Berkeley, CA 1966
- Five Person Exhibition - St. Aidans Episcopal Church, San Francisco, CA 1965
- Solo Exhibit - Distel Gallery, Palo Alto, CA, 1964
- Contemporary Bay Area Figurative Painting: The seminal exhibition with Elmer Bischoff, Richard Diebenkorn, and David Park - Oakland Art Museum, Oakland, CA 1957
- Two Person Show (with Manuel Neri) - Six Gallery, San Francisco, CA 1956

== Publications ==
- Rapko, John. “Artists Of Invention At the Oakland Museum.” Art Week Vol. 39 # 1, Feb. 2008.
- Cripps, Michael. “Bruce McGaw; An Artistic Force In The San Francisco Bay Area.” Lifescapes, May 2006.
- Dalkey, Victoria. “Bright Path In Shadows.” Sacramento Bee, Dec. 19, 2004.
- Bolden, Vanessa. Bruce McGaw; A Survey of 50 Years. John Natsoulas Gallery, Davis, CA, December 2004.
- Hackett-Freedman Gallery. Homage to the San Francisco Art Institute: Artists Who Transformed American Culture.; San Francisco Art Institute. Hackett-Freedman Gallery, San Francisco, CA, Oct 1999.
- McGaw & Casey FitzSimons. "A Conversation with Bruce McGaw, Artist." Art Week, Vol. 27 #6, June 1996.
- Larry, Lawrence M., Lawrence, Sheila Davis. "A Collection of California Contemporary Art at the Official Residence of the United States Ambassador to Switzerland.", 1996
- Shere, Charles. Alvin Light 1931 - 1980; Art At The Center And At The End, in The Expressive Sculpture of Alvin Light. Monterey Museum of Art, Monterey, CA, 1990.
- Jones, Caroline. Bay Area Figurative Art 1950-1965. San Francisco Museum of Art, San Francisco, CA, 1989.
- Albright, Thomas. Art in the San Francisco Bay Area 1945–1980. University of California Press, Berkeley, CA, 1985.
- Berry, Wendell. Salad. North Point Press, Albany, CA, 1981 (Jacket Art)
- Mills, Paul. Bay Area Figurative Painting. Oakland Art Museum, Oakland Museum of Art, Oakland, CA 1957
