= David Park (painter) =

American painter (1911–1960)

- David Park at work Photo by Imogen Cunningham
- Born: March 17, 1911; Boston, Massachusetts, United States
- Died: September 20, 1960 (aged 49); Berkeley, California, United States
- Education: California School of Fine Arts
- Known for: Painting
- Movement: Bay Area Figurative School
- Spouse: Lydia Newell
- Children: 2

David Park (March 17, 1911 – September 20, 1960) was an American painter and a pioneer of the Bay Area Figurative Movement in painting during the 1950s.

== Biography ==
David Park was born in Boston, the son of Mary Turner and Charles Edward Park. His father was a Unitarian minister. He attended the Loomis Chaffee School in Windsor Connecticut and was recognized for his early talent by the sculptor Evelyn Longman Batchelder, the headmaster's wife.

He moved to Los Angeles at the age of 17, staying with his aunt Edith Park Truesdell who was an artist, so he could study at Otis Art Institute in 1928. A year later, he moved to Berkeley where he married Lydia Newell in 1930, and with whom he had two daughters, Natalie and Helen. His first solo show was in 1933 at the Oakland Art Gallery.

In 1943, he began teaching at California School of Fine Arts (CSFA), now known as San Francisco Art Institute (SFAI). During the economic depression, Park returned to Boston to teach art at the Winsor School for Girls.

David Park was one of the post-World War II alumni of the San Francisco Art Institute which was called the California School of Fine Arts (CSFA) at the time. He revived an interest in figurative art, at first experimenting with still-abstracted forms that relied on color for their impact, dynamics and warmth. Park, along with Richard Diebenkorn and Elmer Bischoff, broke away from the philosophy of painting promoted by Clyfford Still, who taught at the Institute, forming what would later be called the Bay Area Figurative Movement. Their influence may be seen in the work of later Bay Area Figurative School artists such as Paul John Wonner, Nathan Oliveira, Manuel Neri, Henry Villierme, Henrietta Berk and Joan Brown.

Although these painters started out painting in what was called an objective style, deploying abstract shapes in large space, they soon migrated to using the physical world and representative subjects to experiment with shape, color, texture and temperature in their painting. Park realized that concentrating on principle and abstraction drew attention to the painter rather than the painting. He felt that it was important to focus on the present, to develop responses to nature. "I believe that we are living at a time that overemphasizes the need of newness, of furthering concepts".

Park worked with figurative painting from about 1950 until about 1959 when he became ill with cancer. Usually working from memory, he initially painted what he saw: kids playing in the street, musicians, his friends, people in their houses. Toward the end of the decade he painted classical studio nudes and bathers in a monumental style. After he became too ill to work with oils, he continued working with watercolors which he produced until his early death in 1960, at the age of 49, of cancer. Park was working at the University of California as an Associate Professor of Art up until he died. He was painting his best works in the final years of his life and career.

== Legacy ==
In 1988, Park received a retrospective at the Whitney Museum of American Art in New York City. Another Park retrospective was held from 2020–2021 at the San Francisco Museum of Modern Art.

Park's Standing Male Nude in the Shower, painted between 1955 and 1957, sold for $1,160,000 at Sotheby's New York on May 15, 2007.
