= Manuel Neri =

American sculptor (1930–2021)

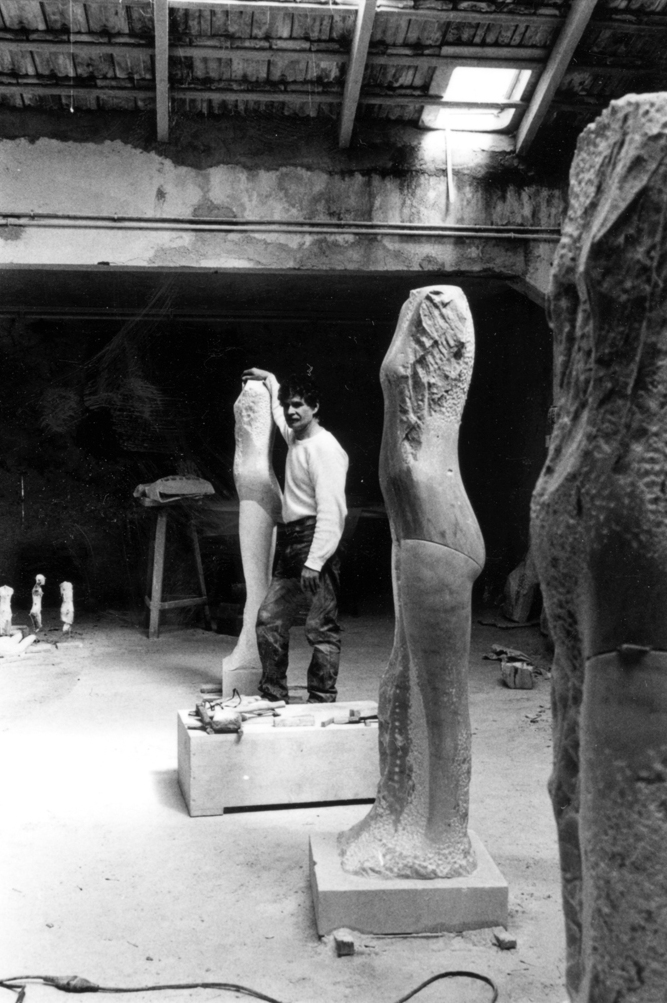
- Sculptor Manuel Neri in his Carrara, Italy studio, 1983; photo by Sally Larsen
- Born: Manuel John Neri Jr. April 12, 1930; Sanger, California, U.S.
- Died: October 18, 2021 (aged 91); Sacramento, California, U.S.
- Education: California College of Arts and Crafts (1951–1952; 1955-1956), California School of Fine Arts (1956-1958)
- Known for: Sculpture, also drawing, painting and printmaking
- Movement: Bay Area Figurative Movement, Funk art
- Awards: Guggenheim Foundation - Fellowship (1979); National Endowment for the Arts - Individual Artist Grant (1980); American Academy and Institute of Arts and Letters – Award in Art (1982); San Francisco Arts Commission – Outstanding Achievement in Sculpture (1985); San Francisco Art Institute – Honorary Doctorate (1990); California College of Arts and Crafts – Honorary Doctorate (1992); Corcoran School of Art – Honorary Doctorate (1995); Orange County Museum of Art - Distinguished Artist Award (1999); International Sculpture Center - Lifetime Achievement Award in Contemporary Sculpture (2006); San Francisco Museum of Modern Art - Bay Area Treasure (2008)

Manuel John Neri Jr. (April 12, 1930 – October 18, 2021) was an American sculptor who is recognized for his life-size figurative sculptures in plaster, bronze, and marble. In Neri's work with the figure, he conveys an emotional inner state that is revealed through body language and gesture. Since 1965 his studio was in Benicia, California; in 1981 he purchased a studio in Carrara, Italy, for working in marble. Over four decades, beginning in the early 1970s, Neri worked primarily with the same model, Mary Julia Klimenko, creating drawings and sculptures that merge contemporary concerns with Modernist sculptural forms.

== Biography ==
Manuel John Neri Jr. was born on April 12, 1930, in Sanger, California, to immigrant parents from Jalisco who left Mexico during political unrest following the Mexican Revolution. He began attending college at San Francisco City College in 1950, initially studying to be an electrical engineer. A class in ceramics with Peter Voulkos inspired him to continue his art studies. He enrolled at California College of Arts and Crafts in Oakland, and at California School of Fine Arts (now the San Francisco Art Institute). Neri studied under Richard Diebenkorn, Elmer Bischoff, and Frank Lobdell, among others. He began to create life-sized figurative sculptures in plaster and mixed media, their surfaces often painted to accentuate the forms and gestures.

In the late 1950s, Neri was a member of the artist-run cooperative gallery, Six Gallery in San Francisco, along with Joan Brown, Bruce Conner, Jay DeFeo, and other artists. In October 1955, he helped organize "6 Poets at 6 Gallery" Six Gallery reading, a landmark Beat era event where Allen Ginsberg gave the first public reading of Howl. In 1959, Neri was an original member of Bruce Conner's Rat Bastard Protective Association. In the 1960s, he was associated with the Bay Area Figurative Movement. He was married to Bay Area artist Joan Brown from 1962 to 1966, though their relationship and artistic collaboration dated back several years prior to this.

Neri taught sculpture and ceramics at California School of Fine Arts from 1959 to 1965, and taught classes in the art department at UC Berkeley in 1963–1964. He was a member of the art department faculty at the University of California, Davis from 1965 to 1990.

In 2006, Neri was a recipient of the International Sculpture Center's Lifetime Achievement Award in Contemporary Sculpture. In 2008 he received the Bay Area Treasure Award from the San Francisco Museum of Modern Art. Previous awards include a Guggenheim Foundation Fellowship (1979), National Endowment for the Arts Individual Artist Grant (1980), American Academy and Institute of Arts and Letters Academy-Institute Award in Art (1982), San Francisco Arts Commission Award for Outstanding Achievement in Sculpture (1985), and Orange County Museum of Art Distinguished Artist Award (Newport Beach, CA, 1999). He received Honorary Doctorates from the San Francisco Art Institute (1990), California College of Arts and Crafts (1992), and The Corcoran School of Art, Washington, D.C. (1995).

== Works ==
Neri created figurative sculptures in plaster, marble, bronze, and clay, their surfaces often sanded, chipped, or painted as a means of directing the gestural thrust. From the late 1970s on he also worked in marble and created numerous figures, torsos, and heads at his studio in Carrara.

He is also noted for his work a draftsman and a collaborator on artists' books. His books include three collaborations with poet Mary Julia Klimenko, and a series of unique books that combine his original drawings with poetry by Pablo Neruda, Federico García Lorca, and W.S. Merwin.

Neri's early works included paintings and mixed-media sculptures based on abstracted figurative or architectural forms. He has received sculpture commissions from the Office of the State Architect, State of California, for the Bateson Building, Sacramento, California (1980-1982); U.S. General Services Administration for the U.S. Courthouse, Portland, Oregon (1987); Laumeier Sculpture Park, Sunset Hills, Missouri (1994); Iowa State University, Ames, Iowa, for the Gerdin Building (2003); St. Anne's Church, Seattle, Washington (2003), and others. Neri's work is represented by Hackett Mill Gallery, San Francisco, California; Robischon Gallery, Denver, Colorado; and Yares Art in Santa Fe, New Mexico, Palm Springs California, and New York City, New York.

== Selected collections ==
Museums holding works by Manuel Neri include the Addison Gallery/Phillips Academy; Anderson Collection at Stanford University; Art Institute of Chicago; Cantor Arts Center, Stanford University; Cincinnati Art Museum; Clarinda Carnegie Art Museum, Clarinda, Iowa; Crocker Art Museum, Sacramento, CA; Denver Art Museum; Des Moines Art Center; DiRosa, Napa, California; El Museo Mexicano, San Francisco; El Paso Museum of Art, Texas; Fine Arts Museums of San Francisco; Frederik Meijer Gardens & Sculpture Park, Grand Rapids, Michigan; Fresno Art Museum; Grounds for Sculpture, Hamilton, New Jersey; Grove Isle Sculpture Garden, Coconut Grove, FL; Harvard University Art Museums; Hirshhorn Museum and Sculpture Garden, Washington, D.C.; Honolulu Museum of Art; Indianapolis Museum of Art; Kemper Museum of Contemporary Art, Kansas City, MO; Laumeier Sculpture Park, Sunset Hills, Mo.; Manetti Shrem Museum, University of California, Davis; Memphis Brooks Museum of Art, Tennessee; Metropolitan Museum of Art, New York; Minneapolis Institute of Art; Nasher Museum at Duke University, Durham, NC; Nasher Sculpture Center, Dallas, Texas; National Gallery of Art, Washington, DC; Nevada Museum of Art, Reno; Oakland Museum of California; Palm Springs Art Museum, California; Phillips Collection, Washington, DC; Phoenix Art Museum; Portland Art Museum, Oregon; Racine Art Museum; San Antonio Museum of Art; San Diego Museum of Art; San Francisco Museum of Modern Art; San Jose Museum of Art, California; Seattle Art Museum; Tampa Museum of Art; Berkeley Art Museum and Pacific Film Archive; University of New Mexico Fine Arts Center, Albuquerque; University Museums, Iowa State University, Ames; Whitney Museum of American Art, New York; Yale University Art Gallery, and New Haven, Connecticut.

== Personal life ==
Manuel Neri had several marriages; he was the second husband of painter Joan Brown from 1962 to 1966 (though their relationship and artistic collaboration dated back several years prior to that). He has seven children: Raoul, Laticia, Noel (his son by Joan Brown), Max, Ruby, Julia, and Gus. He died on October 18, 2021, in Sacramento, California, at the age of 91.

== Books ==
- Albright, Thomas (1985). Art in the San Francisco Bay Area, 1945–1980. Berkeley: University of California Press. ISBN 0-520-05193-9.
- Cancel, Luis R.; et al. (1988). The Latin American Spirit: Art and Artists in the United States, 1920–1970. Bronx: Bronx Museum of the Arts and Harry N. Abrams. ISBN 0-8109-1271-6.
- Cowart, Jack; Amerson, Price (1994). Manuel Neri: A Sculptor's Drawings. Washington, DC: The Corcoran Gallery of Art. ISBN 0-88675-041-5.
- Cowart, Jack; Amerson, Price; Beardsley, John; Geldzahler, Henry; Pincus, Robert (1996). Manuel Neri: Early Work 1953–1978. Washington, DC: The Corcoran Gallery of Art. ISBN 0-88675-046-6.
- Cowart, Jack (2001). Manuel Neri: Paintings and Painted Papers. Washington, DC: The Corcoran Gallery of Art. ISBN 0-88675-064-4.
- Geldzahler, Henry (1993). Manuel Neri: Sculpture, Painted and Unpainted. Bridgehampton, NY: Dia Center for the Arts. ASIN B000L9JN5I. OCLC 30866519.
- Guenther, Bruce (1994). The Essential Gesture. Newport Beach, CA: Newport Harbor Art Museum. ISBN 0-917493-21-4.
- Herskovic, Marika (2009). Abstract and Figurative Expressionism: Style is Timely Art is Timeless. New York School Press. pp. 180–183. ISBN 978-0-9677994-2-1.
- Jones, Caroline A. (1989). Bay Area Figurative Art: 1950–1965. Berkeley: University of California Press. ISBN 0-520-06842-4.
- Neubert, George (1976). Manuel Neri, Sculptor. Oakland, CA: The Oakland Museum. LCCN 76-40536. OCLC 7614261.
- Nixon, Bruce (2012). Things That Dream: Contemporary Calligraphic Artists' Books/Cosas que sueñan: Libros de artistas caligráficos contemporáneos (in English and Spanish). Stanford, CA: Stanford University. ISBN 978-0-911221-48-0.
- Nixon, Bruce (2005). Manuel Neri: Painted Bronzes and Plasters. San Francisco, CA: Hackett Freedman Gallery. ISBN 1-933399-00-7.
- Nixon, Bruce (2005). Manuel Neri: Artists' Books/The Collaborative Process. San Francisco and New York: Fine Arts Museums of San Francisco, in association with Hudson Hills Press. ISBN 1-55595-261-5.
- Nixon, Bruce (2006). Manuel Neri: The Figure in Relief. Hamilton, NJ; Portland, OR; San Jose, CA: Grounds for Sculpture; Portland Art Museum; San Jose Institute for Contemporary Art, in association with Hudson Hills Press. ISBN 1-883124-26-3.
- Nixon, Bruce (2017). Manuel Neri: Matters of Form & Construction. Ames and Clarinda, Iowa: Iowa State University Museums and Clarinda Carnegie Art Museum.
- Nixon, Bruce (2017). Manuel Neri & The Assertion of Modern Figurative Sculpture. Stanford, CA: Anderson Collection/Stanford University Press. ISBN 978-1-5036-0548-0.
- Paz, Octavio; Beardsley, John; Livingston, Jane (1987). Hispanic Art in the United States. New York: Abbeville Press. ISBN 0-89659-688-5.
- Plagens, Peter (1974). Sunshine Muse. New York: Praeger Publishers. ISBN 0-520-22392-6.
- Quirarte, Jacinto (1973). Mexican American Artists. Austin: University of Texas Press. ISBN 0-292-75048-X.
- Reynolds, Jock (2018). Manuel Neri: The Human Figure in Plaster and on Paper. New Haven, Conn.: Yale University Art Gallery. ISBN 978-0-300-23302-5.
- Williams, Thomas (2013). The Bay Area School: Californian Artists of the 1940s, 1950s and 1960s. London: Lund Humphries. ISBN 978-1-84822-123-9.
- Whitcomb, Laura (2021). DILEXI a Gallery & Beyond. Los Angeles: Label Curatorial. ISBN 978-0-578-99535-9.

== See also ==
- Ventana al Pacifico (1989), Portland, Oregon
