= Joan Brown =

American painter

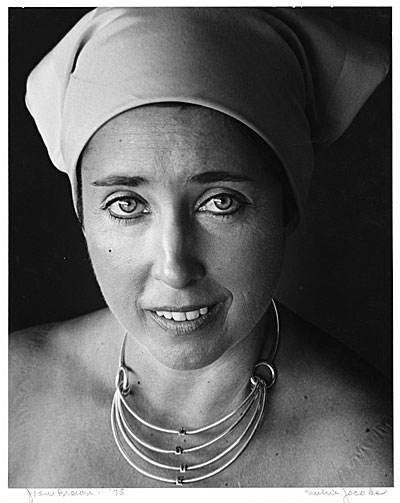
- Brown in 1975
- Born: Joan Vivien Beatty; February 13, 1938; San Francisco, California, U.S.
- Died: October 26, 1990 (aged 52); Puttaparthi, India
- Education: California School of Fine Arts (1955-60) (BFA, 1959; MFA, 1960)
- Known for: Painting
- Movement: Bay Area Figurative Movement
- Awards: James D. Phelan Award (1962) Mademoiselle Merit Award (1963); Louis Comfort Tiffany Award (1965); Adaline Kent Award, San Francisco Art Institute (1973); National Endowment for the Arts Grant (1976, 1980); Guggenheim Fellowship (1977) Honorary Doctor of Fine Arts, San Francisco Art Institute (1986)

Joan Brown (born Joan Vivien Beatty; February 13, 1938 – October 26, 1990) was an American figurative painter who lived and worked in Northern California. She was a member of the "second generation" of the Bay Area Figurative Movement.

== Background ==
In the late 1950s, Joan Brown was a maturing artist who helped make California, and the Bay Area in particular, an important artistic center. Brown worked with multiple other artists to make popular the concepts of figurative painting, Beat Generation culture, and Funk art.

== Education and early life ==
Joan Brown was born on February 19, 1938, in San Francisco to a second-generation Irish father and a native Californian mother. Brown's family life was very unhappy. Her father drank heavily and her mother, who had intended to have a career instead of a family, frequently threatened suicide. Brown could not wait to grow up and move out.

Growing up, Brown acquired her education through Catholic Schools in San Francisco—first St. Vincent de Paul School and then Presentation High School—which engendered in her a revulsion toward Catholic education and religion. She studied at the California School of Fine Arts (now San Francisco Art Institute), graduating with a Bachelor of Fine Arts degree in 1959 and a Master of Arts in 1960. There she met her instructor and mentor Elmer Bischoff. While still a student she had her first solo gallery exhibition in 1958.

In 1956 she married her first husband, Bill Brown, a fellow student who had encouraged her to complete her course and work with Bischoff. However, right before their wedding, she became very ill. Bill Brown presented her with books that contained reproductions of paintings by Rembrandt, Francisco Goya, Diego Velázquez, and other masters. Due to her illness, Brown had time to study the books carefully. She later stated, "I'd never seen any of this stuff, and I felt this tremendous surge of energy". She was inspired to want to follow their example, and she realized that painting professionally was what she was meant to do.

The marriage of Joan and Bill Brown was annulled in 1962. She was married to Bay Area Figurative sculptor Manuel Neri from 1962 to 1966, though their relationship and artistic collaboration dated back several years prior to this.

== Career ==
Brown achieved prominence with a style of figurative painting that combined bright color, sometimes cartoonish drawing, and personal symbolism. Her first museum show occurred at the Whitney annual show in New York (now the Whitney Biennial) in 1960 when she was 22. She was the youngest artist to be exhibited that year.

=== Early career ===
As a teenager, Brown would flip through magazines and make pencil sketches of any celebrities she found to be sophisticatedly dressed. In 1956, Brown took a summer class at CSFA with Elmer Bischoff. Bischoff was the teacher that influenced Brown the most through his motivation, encouragement, and overall mentorship. He told her to follow her heart and to not focus on small details and academic rules. She noted that his instructional methods allowed her to make mistakes and learn from them. Bischoff led Brown to think more about the actual art and the struggles that come along with producing her paintings. This inspired Brown to become more serious and focused on exploring and discovering her talents and techniques.

Influenced by Bischoff's teaching style, many of Brown's paintings were directly related to events that happened in her life. She had many other interests other than art. She loved to dance and swim. She was also very involved in her son's life as well as her romantic relationships and marriages. All of these things were incorporated into her art. Joan Brown became increasingly popular and admirable in her artwork. In 1960, at the age of 22, Brown had her first New York City exhibition of her abstract expressionist paintings.

Her interests began to alter as she progressed through her work and through her life. Leading up to her death, she focused heavily on ancient cultures and spirituality.

Nude, Dog, Clouds (1963) at the Smithsonian American Art Museum in 2022

In 1960 and 1961, as Brown began to mature as an artist, she switched from painting abstract works to focusing more on figurative imagery. These paintings began to incorporate intense colors and dramatic lighting. The energy she brought into these paintings was through the use of large brush strokes and palette knives. She would also allow paint to drip randomly on various areas of the canvas. The imagery she portrayed helped set the tone that these paintings, such as Portrait of Bob for Bingo (1960), were very autobiographical and helped to represent important events and objects in her life. Her painting The Sky Blew Up in Salinas (1960) had many abstract shapes inspired by Peter Voulkos's ceramic works and Frank Lobdell's handling of paint.

In 1962, Brown had a son, Noel Elmer Neri, with her second husband, Manuel Neri. In 1963–1964, Brown's paintings were focused on the life of her son. She painted major events and challenges that happened in her son's life throughout this time. One of her first paintings that focused on Noel was Noel’s First Christmas (1963), which was especially important to her because it mixed her love for her son with her love for Christmas. She produced few paintings in 1964 because she was occupied with teaching, as well as dealing with the disintegration of her marriage to Neri, whom she divorced in 1966.

In 1965, Brown decided to completely change her painting style. Believing that the thick impasto, large scale, and brilliant color of her previous works had become a routine, she switched to painting more intimate, detailed, less spontaneous, black and white paintings.

=== Later career ===
In 1968, she married artist Gordon Cook. While seemingly very different, the two artists respected and inspired each other's work. Brown went back to using color again in her paintings. Her paintings, at this time, were produced for self-reflection. She kept her technique as figurative and representational, but she focused more metaphorically now. This had to do with many recent events in her life, including the death of both of her parents. Her love for cats began to show in her works. She started to include more animals and more symbolism than she had done previously.

In the 1970s Brown produced autobiographical works based on actual and imagined events. She was a swimmer in amateur competitions and swam in the first women's Golden Gate swim in San Francisco Bay. In 1974, she joined the faculty of the University of California, Berkeley teaching art. In 1975 she and a group of others nearly drowned during a swim to Alcatraz Island when a passing freighter swamped the group. Her paintings based on the experience included the self-portrait After the Alcatraz Swim #3.

Brown painted many self-portraits. While all of her paintings were very personal and incorporated into them specific events from her life, her self-portraits made her paintings become even more personal. Not only were they fitting to her life, she also tied her self-portraits into some of her other paintings. She created these series of self-portraits to portray her thoughts and emotions. After her near death experience of swimming across the San Francisco Bay from Alcatraz Island, she painted After the Alcatraz Swim in 1975 to help her cope with almost drowning.

In 1977, Brown received a Guggenheim Fellowship for Fine Arts.

== As a teacher ==
From 1961 until 1969, Brown taught introductory painting and drawing classes at the California School of Fine Arts, San Francisco. In 1964, she was invited to University of Colorado at Boulder to teach during the summer. Brown taught painting to both undergraduate and graduate students. She also taught at the Academy of Art College in San Francisco (1966–1967 and 1971–1973), the University of Victoria, British Columbia (1969), Sacramento State College (1970–1971), and Mills College, Oakland (1973). From 1974 to 1990, she was an art professor in the Department of Art Practice at the University of California, Berkeley with tenure.

== Death ==
In the late 1970s, Brown became increasingly interested in spirituality and New Age ideas, eventually becoming a friend of Sathya Sai Baba. She made a number of trips to his ashram in Puttaparthi, India. She withdrew from painting later on and concentrated on public sculpture. Her influences were Egyptian and Hindu icons. The works she produced after this trip reflected the experiences and observations she made. Brown then travelled all over the world, producing paintings from the different cultures and experiences she was having. In 1990, Brown travelled to India to help with the installation of one of her obelisks. Brown died along with Bonnie Lynn Mainric, 43, of San Francisco, and Michael Oliver, 25, a Santa Cruz comedian on 26 October 1990 when a concrete turret from the floor above collapsed while they were installing the mosaic obelisk at Sai Baba's Eternal Heritage Museum in Puttaparthi, India. At the time of her death, Brown was married to Mike Hebel, a police officer.

== Legacy ==
In 2016 her biography was included in the exhibition catalogue Women of Abstract Expressionism organized by the Denver Art Museum. Her work was included in the 2022 exhibition Women Painting Women at the Modern Art Museum of Fort Worth. The San Francisco Museum of Modern Art (SFMOMA) holds twenty-five of her works in its collection and, in November 2022, recognized her legacy with a major retrospective, including approximately eighty of Brown's paintings and sculptures. This retrospective of Brown's work is the first of its kind in more than twenty years.

== Sources ==
- Marika Herskovic, Abstract and Figurative Expressionism: Style is Timely Art is Timeless (New York School Press, 2009.) ISBN 0-9677994-2-2. pp. 56–59
- Tsujimoto K, Baas J. (1998). The Art of Joan Brown. Berkeley, CA: University of California Press. p. 3. ISBN 0-520-21468-4 (hardbound), ISBN 0-520-21469-2 (paperback)
