= Leon Goldin =

American painter (1925–2023)

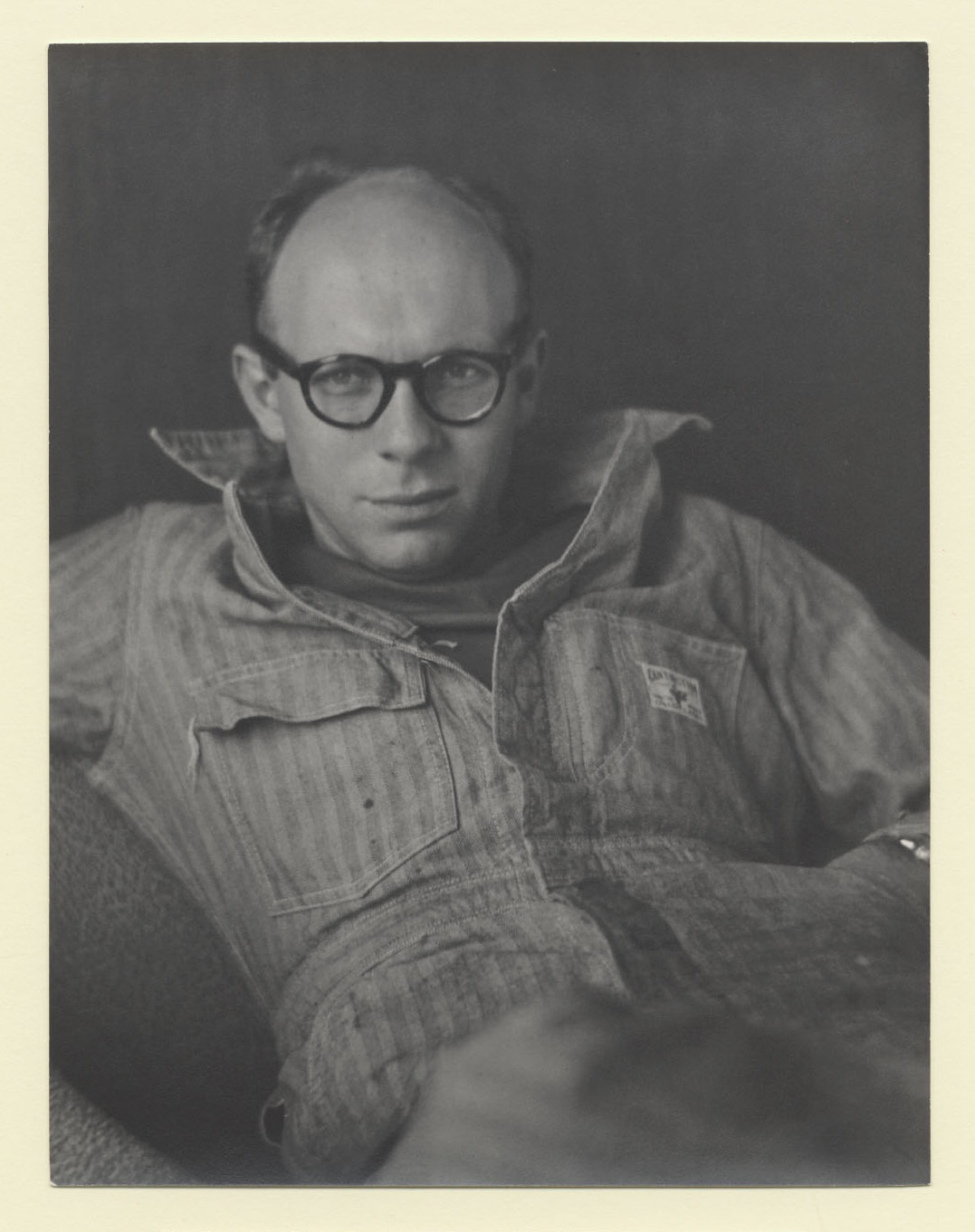
- Photography by Johan Hagemeyer, Hagemeyer's photograph collection, The Bancroft Library, University of California, Berkeley, © The Regents of the University of California
- Born: January 16, 1923; Chicago, Illinois, U.S.
- Died: January 30, 2009 (aged 86); New York City, NY
- Occupation: Artist
- Awards: Guggenheim Fellowship, Prix de Rome, Fulbright Scholarship, National Institute of Arts and Letters, National Endowment for the Arts, Ford Foundation Purchase Prize

Academic background
- Education: Art Institute of Chicago (BFA); University of Iowa (MFA)

Academic work
- Discipline: Abstract expressionism, High modernism
- Institutions: Columbia University; California College of Arts and Crafts (CCAC); Cooper Union
- Website: https://leongoldin.com/

Leon Goldin (1923–2009) was a post-war American painter and printmaker who worked in the tradition of abstract expressionism and high modernism. Goldin was born in 1923, earning his BFA at the Art Institute of Chicago and later his MFA at the University of Iowa, where he studied intaglio printmaking under Mauricio Lasansky. In 1953 he won a Fulbright Scholarship in Painting. In 1955 he was awarded the prestigious Prix de Rome, allowing him to work and study as a Fellow at the American Academy of Rome between 1955 and 1958. In 1959, Goldin returned to New York, where he was supported by a Guggenheim Fellowship. From 1964 to 1992, Goldin worked as a professor of art at Columbia University and later as the department chair. During this period up until his death in 2009, Goldin was represented by Kraushaar Galleries in New York. In 1971, he was listed in the Dictionary of Contemporary American Artists.

Goldin was affiliated with the Bay Area Figurative Movement between 1950 and 1954, during which time he pioneered work in Color Field and unconventional printmaking techniques. In New York, he was closely aligned with the Abstract Expressionist painters of the New York School, associating with and befriending other artists including David Lund, Karl Schrag, Jack Sonnenberg, Dan Hodermarsky, Stephen Pace (artist), Emily Mason, and Wolf Kahn. These disparate artists took inspiration from the landscape of Deer Isle, Maine, and many of them took up residence there part of the year, where they formed a tight-knit artistic community

Goldin's work can be found in the permanent collections of the Baltimore Museum of Art., LACMA, the Brooklyn Museum, the National Academy of Design, the National Gallery of Art, the Pennsylvania Academy of Fine Arts, and the Smithsonian American Art Museum. His work has been exhibited at the Museum of Modern Art, the Oakland Museum, the Felix Landau Gallery, and L'Attico galleria d'arte in Rome
