= Henrietta Berk =

American painter (1919–1990)

- Born: Henrietta Robin; January 9, 1919; Wichita, Kansas, US
- Died: January 15, 1990 (aged 71); Oakland, California, US
- Education: California College of Arts and Crafts
- Known for: Painting
- Movement: Abstract expressionism, Bay Area Figurative Movement
- Spouses: Morris Berk; Paul Farberman

Henrietta Berk (January 9, 1919 – January 15, 1990) was a painter in the San Francisco Bay Area whose work was part of the Bay Area Figurative Movement taking place in the mid-20th century. Her oil paintings were noted for their strong colors and shapes.

== Early life and education ==
Henrietta Robin was born in Wichita, Kansas. She and her siblings spent some of their childhood at the Pacific Hebrew Orphan Asylum and Home in San Francisco, after their father left the family and their mother, a seamstress, could not support a family. She attended the California College of Arts and Crafts in Oakland from 1955 to 1959, where she studied with Richard Diebenkorn and Harry Krell.

== Career ==
Berk was known for intensely-colored landscapes, portraits, still life and abstract compositions. Her paintings were described as "refreshing in their candor, warm, colorful, exciting with enormous vitality and vibrating with her dominant personality," in the words of one admirer. "With all her squeezed-from-the-tube, knifed-on impastos, there is discipline in her structure, a balance in the pull of color, of texture, an equilibrium of horizontals, verticals, and receding planes and a constant shift from surface to deep space," commented another reviewer in 1972. Berk decorated her home with her own paintings, and works by Berk were part of the US Embassy's art library. Her works were also seen in the film Guess Who's Coming to Dinner? (1967).

Berk held her first one-woman show in 1959. Beginning in 1960, her artwork was exhibited at galleries and museums throughout California, including the San Francisco Museum of Art, Oakland Museum, de Young Museum, The Carter Gallery, and the de Saisset Museum. In 1972 she traveled to Israel on a study mission for the Jewish Welfare Federation of Alameda and Contra Costa Counties, and made pen-and-ink drawings to benefit the United Jewish Welfare Fund. 1974 she traveled to Mexico City as a guest of the Mexico Travel Association, and made pen-and-ink drawings of her travels for the Oakland Tribune.

In her later life, diabetic retinopathy affected Berk's vision, and she was described as a blind artist. "I can't drive and I can't read very well, but I can paint," she explained in 1988. In 1989 she marked her 70th birthday with a one-woman show at Interart Gallery in San Francisco. "Because I'm seeing less, it forces me to work large, have more contrast and make a bolder statement," she told an interviewer in 1989.

== Personal life and legacy ==
Robin married twice. Her first husband was physician Morris Berk; they married in 1939 and 1944, had two children, Anne and Steven, and divorced in 1969. Her second husband was Paul Farberman; they married in 1972 and divorced in 1973. She died in 1990, at the age of 71, in Oakland.

A retrospective exhibit of Berk's work opened at The Hilbert Museum at Chapman University on August 28, 2021, in conjunction with a book on the artist, In Living Color, The Art & Life of Henrietta Berk, developed by Steven Stern and published by Cool Titles.
