= SFAI Legacy Foundation + Archive =

Nonprofit and archive in San Francisco, California

San Francisco Art Institute Legacy Foundation + Archive (SFAI LF+A) is an independent nonprofit created to safeguard and sustain the former San Francisco Art Institute’s (SFAI) legacy and historical collections. Its mission is to preserve the 150-year history of the former art school in San Francisco, California, which chronicles Northern California art since 1871 and the school’s influence as a leader in experimental artistic practice and innovative scholarship. SFAI LF+A provides access to its archives for artists, scholars, and the public through programs, publications, and exhibitions.

== History and development ==
With no financial options left, the SFAI ended all course and degree programs, held its final commencement on July 12, 2022, and closed permanently. Amid the school's impending closure, SFAI librarians Jeff Gunderson and Becky Alexander secured a grant for $234,000 from the National Endowment for the Humanities (NEH) in April 2022. The grant funded, "Expanding the Conversation: Improving Access to 150 Years of Archival Collections at the San Francisco Art Institute" project, which aimed to arrange, describe, and rehouse 544 linear feet of the school's archives, significantly enhancing both public and scholarly access to the school's historical records.

After the San Francisco Art Institute’s July 2022 closure, Gunderson and Alexander led an informal group of SFAI community members to discuss the possibility of starting an independent nonprofit focused on preserving SFAI’s archives and legacy resources, and protecting the collection from the school’s creditors. As a result of these meetings, in August, SFAI Legacy Foundation + Archive (SFAI LF+A) was officially established as a 501(c)3 tax-exempt nonprofit organization, with Charles DeSantis, Gale Elston, and Katie Hood Morgan serving as founding board members, and archivists Becky Alexander, and Jeff Gunderson overseeing daily operations. Building on this progress, in November 2022, the SFAI Board of Trustees officially granted possession of the SFAI archives to SFAI LF+A. It also transferred the right to administer the July 2022 National Endowment for the Humanities grant to SFAI LF+A.

In April 2023, as the SFAI filed for bankruptcy, the school's collection and archives, now overseen by the new SFAI LF+A, were removed from the campus's Anne Bremer Memorial Library and the school's bell tower. Around 1,000 boxes of materials were moved to a 1,500 square feet (140 m^{2}) space in the basement of a building on Hawthorne Street, the new home of SFAI LF+A, located next to Crown Point Press in San Francisco’s South of Market (SoMa) district, near several major museums.

In April 2025, the Trump administration rescinded the 2022 National Endowment for the Humanities (NEH) grant of $234,000 awarded to the SFAI Legacy Foundation + Archive. The grant was part of a broader, politically driven effort to claw back funding for cultural projects, with approximately 75% of the award intended for preserving the San Francisco Art Institute's historic collection.

== Archive and collections ==
Following SFAI's permanent closure in 2022, protecting its 152-year history of influencing Northern California art and culture became a critical mission. To ensure that the SFAI legacy and unique archives remain available for future scholarship, the SFAI LF+A made preserving these records an essential priority. The collection comprises 550 linear feet of archival material. It includes manuscripts, account books, meeting minutes, blueprints, ephemera, photographs, audio and video recordings, and student and alumni artworks.

Additionally, there is an eclectic assortment of items, including a file on the ghost(s) haunting the school's bell tower, a 1970's "dogs on campus" file regarding students’ dogs roaming the school grounds and the messes they left behind, and various interesting objects such as a folding chair, complete with a metal plaque that commemorates when avant-garde composer John Cage sat in it while performing on campus.

== Community engagement ==
In October 2024, SFAI LF+A launched a series of complimentary Walking Tours throughout downtown San Francisco.

An ongoing project, The SFAI Memory Collection digital repository was created by the SFAI Legacy Foundation + Archive in collaboration with the SF Artists Alumni (SFAA). The active project collects narratives, photographs, and cinematic pieces from the SFAI community, including alumni, faculty, staff, and students, to preserve the history and creative legacy of SFAI.

SFAI LF+A was a major contributor to People Make This Place: SFAI Stories, an exhibition at the San Francisco Museum of Modern Art (SFMOMA) running from July 26, 2025, to July 2026. The exhibition celebrates the legacy of the SFAI and features works by more than 50 alumni and faculty, including archival ephemera provided by SFAI LF+A, such as student newspapers, posters from 1950s Beat-era galleries, and flyers from the 1970s punk and new wave music scenes.
