= Bay Area Figurative Movement =

American art movement

The Bay Area Figurative Movement (also known as the Bay Area Figurative School, Bay Area Figurative Art, Bay Area Figuration, and similar variations) was a mid-20th-century art movement centered in the San Francisco Bay Area. Emerging in the 1950s and 1960s, it brought together a group of artists who abandoned working in the prevailing style of Abstract Expressionism, embracing a renewed focus in figuration in painting.

The New York School of Abstract Expressionism was the first American style of art to have international importance. The San Francisco Bay Area was the center for an independent variant of Abstract Expressionism. The Bay Area Figurative Movement was in response to both. Because Bay Area Figuration often employed the spontaneity of Abstract Expressionism, it is considered a hybrid style that produced challenging or problematic pictures.

The first exhibition to present this movement, Contemporary Bay Area Figurative Painting was organized by Paul Mills for the Oakland Art Museum. The exhibition ran September 8 - 29, 1957 and then traveled to the following museums: Los Angeles County Museum, Exposition Park, Los Angeles, California, 13 November 1957 - 22 December 1957, Dayton Art Institute, Ohio, 7 January 1958 - 9 February 1958, The Colorado Springs Fine Arts Center, Colorado, 1 March 1958 - 1 March 1958. The artists in the show, chosen by Paul Mills and David Park, were Richard Diebenkorn, David Park, Elmer Bischoff, Joseph Brooks, Theophilus Brown, Robert Downs, Bruce McGaw, Robert Qualters, Walter Snelgrove, Henry Villierme, James Weeks, and Paul Wonner.

Many of the pioneering artists in this movement were Abstract Expressionists until several of them abandoned non-objective painting in favor of working with the figure. Among these artists were David Park, Richard Diebenkorn, Elmer Bischoff, Paul Wonner, Theophilus Brown, and James Weeks.

They were followed by painter Joan Brown and the sculptor Manuel Neri who were briefly married. Other Bay Area artists who became associated with the style include Nathan Oliveira, Henrietta Berk Terry St. John, and Frank Lobdell, an abstract painter who made figurative life drawings. Artists who taught at UC Davis also developed figurative work, including Wayne Thiebaud, Roland Petersen and William Wiley, but because their work developed outside the Bay Area and had different stylistic roots, they are generally not considered part of the Bay Area Figurative Movement

The California School of Fine Arts (which later became the San Francisco Art Institute, where many former GIs used their benefits to take art classes after WWII, was the center of this style. David Park, Elmer Bischoff and Richard Diebenkorn met there and developed close personal friendships. Many other Bay Area schools and institutions were also important to the development and refinement of this art movement, including the California College of Arts and Crafts, where Nathan Oliveira taught, and the University of California, Berkeley where David Park, Elmer Bischoff and Joan Brown taught.

== Participants in the 1957 exhibition Contemporary Bay Area Figurative Painting ==
=== David Park ===
David Park (1911–1960) was the initiator of the Bay Area Figurative Movement. As an influential teacher at the California School of Fine Arts beginning in 1943, he painted abstractly until late 1949, when he took his non-objective paintings to the dump. In the spring of 1951, Park won a prize for a figurative canvas, "Kids on Bikes" that he submitted to a competitive exhibition. Park's turn to figurative style baffled some of his colleagues, as at the time, abstract painting was the only way to go for progressive artists. This stylistic shift, which some of his peers initially thought was a joke, gradually influenced his peers, including Elmer Bischoff and Richard Diebenkorn, to experiment with figuration.

During the decade that followed, Park's oil paintings evolved from using firm brushwork towards a lush, painterly style that included heavy, wet-on-wet brushstrokes, alongside drips and spatters. Before his death from bone cancer in 1960, Park was the subject of a one-man show at the Staempfli Gallery in New York City in October of 1959. That show included many large canvases, including "Four Men," now in the collection of the Whitney Museum.

In 2004, Hackett Freedman Gallery in San Francisco held an exhibition of 35 of David Park's works from 1953 to 1960. These were the works that marked the final years of his life, and the exhibition was held to celebrate his life as well as his return to figure painting in 1950, which was instrumental in starting the movement. Some of the earlier works in the exhibition suggest that Park responded to the art of Max Beckmann, and his influence is particularly visible in The Band (1955). Over the years, Park's palette turned towards an ebullient chromaticism, but his carving approach to paint handling could be seen in his work throughout, until finally he decided to give up oils in 1959.

Some of David Park's important works are Mother in Law (1954–55), Violin and Cello (1939), Torso (1959), and Figure in Chair (1960).

=== Elmer Bischoff ===
Elmer Bischoff (1916–1991), in his late thirties and forties, had an extensive phase of what he called "Picassoesque mouthings". After returning from war in 1945, he felt impelled to challenge all the assumptions that he held about art as well as life. When asked about this in an interview, he said, “Until then art had been an external acquisition; [but now it] became more of a quest.” It was around this time that he was hired as a short-term replacement at the school of fine arts.

Just like his abstract work, Bischoff achieved great success with his early figurative works. Bischoff entered his painting Figure and Red Wall in the Fifth Annual Oil and Sculpture Exhibition at the Richmond Art Center and won the $200 first prize for it. This feat earned him a solo show at the Paul Kantor Gallery in Los Angeles. However, it was a one-person show of paintings and drawings in January 1956 at the California School of Fine Arts gallery that Bischoff believed had the biggest impact on his future.

Some of Bischoff's important works are Figure at window with Boat (1964), Playground (1954), and The River (1953).

=== Richard Diebenkorn ===
Out of all the early artists, it was Richard Diebenkorn (1922–1993) who took the biggest risk by turning to figuration in 1955. Diebenkorn was nationally recognized for his abstract work. James Johnson Sweeney's exhibition "Younger American Painters", resulted in his work was extensively shown by dealers in Los Angeles and Chicago. Along with his national reputation for his abstract work, Diebenkorn was also a beloved abstractionist among the locals in Sausalito.

After that he focused on figurative art but it was not until 1956 that he attempted complex figurative paintings. His earliest figurative works seemed to loosely be based on self-portraits. He returned to abstraction in the mid-1960s.

=== Theophilus Brown and Paul John Wonner ===
Theophilus Brown (1919–2012) and Paul John Wonner (1920–2008) were a gay couple whose careers were chronicled in the 2023-24 exhibition "Breaking the Rules: Paul Wonner and Theophilus Brown." Both were influenced by each other, and by their peers, to experiment with figurative art. In 1955, both Brown and Wonner rented studio spaces within the same building which was also the building where Richard Diebenkorn worked. Diebenkorn, Bischoff and Park joined Brown and Wonner to hold life-drawing sessions. They were occasionally joined by James Weeks and Nathan Oliviera.

Wonner's figurative works were displayed in an exhibition held at the California School of Fine Arts gallery late in 1956. From the very beginning Wonner was committed to conventions of representation, and identified line as a firm descriptive boundary and edge. Brown's early figurative works included semi-abstract images of football players influenced by the paintings of Willem de Kooning. Some of these works were featured in a 1956 Life Magazine feature article which helped launch Brown's career.

Some of Brown's works are Male Nude Seated (1960) and Sun and Moon (1960), while Wonner's works include Side of the house, Malibu (1965) and Mountain Near Tucson (1963).

=== Bruce McGaw ===
Bruce McGaw was born in 1935 and was the youngest artist to be included in the 1957 Contemporary Bay Area Figurative Painting exhibition. He studied at California College of Arts and Crafts and took one of the first classes taught by Diebenkorn in 1955. McGaw had a close relationship with Diebenkorn, who even met with McGaw's parents to show them his support for their son's works. McGaw also studied with Leon Goldin, where he worked with abstraction.

McGaw was not confined to any particular style and moved from one style to the other. One of McGaw's first mature figurative paintings clearly showed influences from Diebenkorn but McGaw also showed a lot of new features of his own. He was not aggressive in promoting his art and did not achieve the commercial success enjoyed by his peers. McGaw was associated with Beat poets including Gary Snyder and Philip Whalen. He taught at the San Francisco Art Institute for 60 years, making him its longest serving faculty member.

== Other Notable Bay Area Figurative Artists ==
=== Joan Brown ===
Joan Brown created colorful, expansive paintings depicting her life and experiences in San Francisco, where she lived and worked in for nearly all her life. Her time as a figurative artist was intense and productive and provided some of the most important works of the Movement. Brown earned a BFA and MFA from the California School of Fine Arts (which became the San Francisco Art Institute). It was there that she met a key mentor, artist Elmer Bischoff, and began gaining recognition for her paintings. In 1960, she was the youngest artist exhibited as part of Young America 1960 (Thirty American Painters Under Thirty-Six) at the Whitney Museum of American Art.

Some of Joan Brown's works are Woman and Dog in Room with Chinese Rug (1975) and Noel at the Table with a Large Bowl of Fruit (1963).

=== Manuel Neri ===
Manuel Neri was a sculptor. Neri explored abstraction during the early stages of his career, like all the younger Bay Area Figurative artists. It was only after he left school in 1959 that he took up figuration. It allowed him to synthesize his interests in color and form and to play with the ambiguities of content. It is the non-specificity of his figures and their abstract qualities that make his sculptures part of the Bay Area Figurative Movement and not just any contemporary figurative sculpture in America.

Neri, only two years younger than Nathan Oliveira, had a similar childhood and like Oliveira had no interest in art as a kid. The only reason Neri took a course in ceramics in school was to lighten his load. His ceramics teacher was Roy Walker who encouraged him to pursue art further by taking advanced classes. Neri soon dropped his engineering classes and in 1951 started taking courses at the California College of Arts and Crafts, where he officially enrolled in 1952.

Some of Neri's important works are Untitled Standing Figure (1956–57) and College Painting No. 1 (1958–59).

=== Nathan Oliveira ===
Nathan Oliveira (1928–2010) is associated with Bay Area Figuration, although he personally felt more connected to postwar European art and was influenced by Max Beckmann, Alberto Giacometti and Francis Bacon (artist).

During an early trip to M. H. de Young Memorial Museum, Oliveira decided to become a portrait painter after being entranced by the work of Rembrandt. He later went on to serve in the army, where he managed to keep up with his art scene. He did not consider himself avant-garde or part of a specific movement.

Oliveira's early figurative works tend to have more detail and color, which can be seen in his Seated Man with Dog. His works completed in the San Leandro studio in 1959, in his own words, "became the very foundation of [his] whole identity as a painter in [his] country."

Some of Nathan's important works are Seated Man with Dog (1957), Man Walking (1958), and Adolescent by the Bed (1959).

=== Henrietta Berk ===
Henrietta Berk (1919–1990) painted mostly in oil. Her work was noted for its strong colors and shapes. Berk developed her own unique approach to art with daring use of color and unique interpretation of shape and light. Her work is remarkable considering the challenging times for female artists in the 1960s and the glass ceiling she fought so hard to break. Berk attended the California College of Arts and Crafts in Oakland from 1955 to 1959, where she studied with Richard Diebenkorn and Harry Krell. Some of Berk's most noted works are Me or Facade (1960), Picnic (1961), Golden Gate (1961), Three Figures (1962), Racing (1964), Leaning Figure (1967), and Lagoon Valley Road (1968).

A retrospective exhibit of her work opened at The Hilbert Museum at Chapman University June 13, 2020, in conjunction with a book on the artist, "In Living Color, The Art & Life of Henrietta Berk", edited by Cindy Johnson and published by Cool Titles.

== See also ==
- Paula Kirkeby, local gallery owner and printing press owner that published and represented Bay Area Figurative Movement artists

== Sources ==
- Boas, Nancy (2012). David Park: A Painter's Life. Berkeley: University of California. ISBN 9780520268418
- Chadwick, Witney (1984). “Narrative Imagism and the Figurative Tradition in Northern California Painting”. Art Journal 45(4), 309.
- Falk, Peter Hastings. (1999) Who Was Who in American Art: 1564-1975, Madison, CT: Sound View Press, Vol. I, p. 143.
- Gomez, Edward M. (February 5, 1990). “The San Francisco Rebellion”. Time.
- Jones, Caroline A. (1990) Bay Area Figurative Art: 1950-1965, Berkeley, CA: University of California Press, ISBN 0-520-06842-4
- Knight, Christopher (December 15, 1989). “ART REVIEW: Figurative ‘50s Work Whose Time Has Come”. Los Angeles Times.
- Landauer, Susan (2000) The Lighter Side of Bay Area Figuration, San Jose, CA: Kemper Museum of Contemporary Art, ISBN 1-891246-03-8
- Landauer, Susan (2001). Elmer Bischoff: The Ethics of Paint. Berkeley: University of California. ISBN 0520230426
- Livingston, Jane, John Elderfield (1997). The Art of Richard Diebenkorn. New York: Whitney Museum of American Art, 1997. ISBN 0520212584
- Van Proyen, Mark. "David Park at Hackett-Freedman." Art In America 92, no. 4 (April 2004): 140–141. Art Full Text (H.W. Wilson), EBSCOhost (accessed May 13, 2016).
