= Paul Wonner =

American artist (1920–2008)

- Born: Paul John Wonner; April 24, 1920; Tucson, Arizona, U.S.
- Died: April 23, 2008 (aged 87)
- Known for: Abstract expressionist
- Movement: Bay Area Figurative Movement

Paul John Wonner (April 24, 1920 – April 23, 2008) was an American artist best known for his still-life paintings done in an abstract expressionist style. Born in Tucson, Arizona, he received a B.A. in 1952, an M.A. in 1953, and an M.L.S. in 1955―all from the University of California, Berkeley. He rose to prominence in the 1950s as an abstract expressionist associated with the Bay Area Figurative Movement, along with his partner, Theophilus Brown, whom he met in 1952 while attending graduate school. In 1956, Wonner started painting a series of dreamlike male bathers and boys with bouquets. In 1962, he began teaching at the University of California, Los Angeles. By the end of the 1960s, he had abandoned his loose figurative style and focused exclusively on still lifes in a hyperrealist style. Wonner died April 23, 2008, in San Francisco, California.

== Permanent collections ==
- Cantor Arts Center (Stanford University, California)
- Crocker Art Museum, (Sacramento, California)
- Davis Art Center, (Davis, California)
- Honolulu Museum of Art
- Hunter Museum of American Art, (Chattanooga, Tennessee)
- Kemper Museum of Contemporary Art, (Kansas City, Missouri)
- Kresge Art Museum
- Madison Museum of Contemporary Art, (University of Wisconsin, Madison, Wisconsin)
- McNay Art Museum, (San Antonio, Texas)
- San Francisco Museum of Modern Art, San Francisco, California
- Sheldon Museum of Art (Lincoln, Nebraska)
- Smithsonian American Art Museum (Washington, D.C.)
- Museum of Modern Art, New York
- Solomon R. Guggenheim Museum (New York City)

== See also ==
- Bay Area Figurative Movement
