= Nathan Oliveira =

American painter (1928–2010)

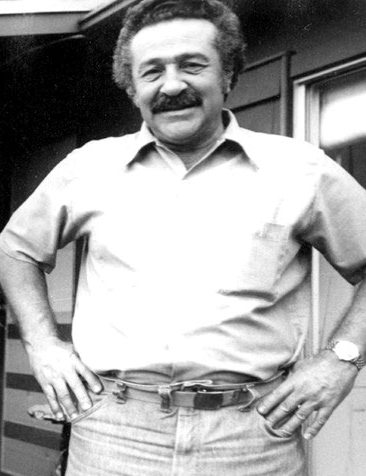
- Nathan Oliveira at his Stanford home, 1977
- Born: Nathan Vargus Roderick; December 19, 1928; Oakland, California, U.S.
- Died: November 13, 2010 (aged 81); Palo Alto, California, U.S.
- Education: California College of the Arts
- Known for: Painting, sculpture, printmaking, educator

Nathan Oliveira (December 19, 1928 – November 13, 2010) was an American painter, printmaker, and sculptor, born in Oakland, California to immigrant Portuguese parents. Since the late 1950s, Oliveira has been the subject of nearly one hundred solo exhibitions, in addition to having been included in hundreds of group exhibitions in important museums and galleries worldwide. He taught studio art for several decades in California, beginning in the early 1950s, when he taught at the California College of Arts and Crafts (now California College of the Arts) in Oakland. After serving as a Visiting Artist at several universities, he became a Professor of Studio Art at Stanford University.

In 1999 Nathan Oliveira was awarded the Distinguished Degree of "Commander" in "The Order of the Infante D. Henrique," awarded by the President of Portugal and the Portuguese government, for his artistic and cultural achievements.

In 2002, "The Art of Nathan Oliveira" opened, a major traveling retrospective of his work organized by the San Jose Museum of Art and guest curated by Peter Selz. The exhibition was accompanied by a monograph, Nathan Oliveira, by Selz, with an introduction by Susan Landauer and an essay by Joann Moser, published by the University of California Press.

== Early life and education ==
Nathan Oliveira, Portrait of John Young, 1976, acrylic on canvas, John Young Museum of Art, University of Hawaii at Manoa

Oliveira arrived with his family in San Francisco after World War II and graduated from San Francisco's George Washington High School.

He studied at the California College of Arts and Crafts (now California College of the Arts) in Oakland, California, where he earned a BFA degree in 1951 and an MFA degree in 1952. While attending CCAC, he took an eight-week summer course in painting at Mills College taught by the German Expressionist Max Beckmann.

== Teaching ==
After graduation Oliveira taught art at several colleges, including the California College of the Arts, The California School of Fine Arts (now The San Francisco Art Institute), the University of Chicago, UCLA and Stanford University.

- 1952–53 Printmaking Instructor, California School of Fine Arts, San Francisco, CA
- 1952-53 Watercolor Instructor, California College of the Arts, Oakland, CA
- 1955–56 Chair of Graphic Arts, California College of the Arts, Oakland, CA
- 1961-62 Visiting Professor in Painting, University of Chicago, Chicago, IL
- 1962-63 Visiting Professor in Studio Art, University of California, Los Angeles, CA
- 1963-64 Visiting Professor in Studio Art, Cornell University, Ithaca, NY
- 1964–96 Professor of Studio Arts, Stanford University, Stanford, CA

During his Stanford years, Oliveira held summer positions as a visiting artist in Colorado and Hawaii. He also served as a member of the Honorary Board of the Humane Society Silicon Valley in Milpitas, California from 2007 until his death in 2010.

== Awards ==
- 1999 Distinguished Degree of "Commander" in "The Order of the Infante D. Henrique" awarded by the President of Portugal and the Portuguese government.
- 1996 Honorary Doctorate of Fine Arts, Honoris Causa, San Francisco Art Institute, San Francisco, CA
- California Society of Printmakers Honors Nathan Oliveira for Distinguished Artistic Achievement
- 1994 Elected Fellow, American Academy of Arts and Sciences, Cambridge
- Elected Academy Membership (Fellow), American Academy of Arts and Letters, New York, NY
- 1992 Ann O'Day Maples Professor in the Arts Emeritus, Stanford University, CA
- 1988 Ann O'Day Maples Professor in the Arts, Endowed Chair, Stanford University, CA
- 1985 Academician, Graphic Arts, National Academy of Design, New York, NY
- 1984 Academy Institute Award in Art, American Academy and Institute of Arts and Letters, New York, NY
- 1982 Elected Member, National Academy of Design, New York, NY
- 1974 National Endowment for the Arts, Individual Artist Grant
- 1968 Doctor of Fine Arts Degree, Honoris Causa, California College of Arts and Crafts, Oakland, CA
- 1963 - 1964 Tamarind Lithography Fellowship, Los Angeles, CA
- 1963 Arte Actual de America y España Special Prize, Madrid, Spain
- 1959 Norman Wait Harris Bronze Medal, Art Institute of Chicago, Chicago, IL
- 1958 John Simon Guggenheim Fellowship
- 1957 Louis Comfort Tiffany Foundation Grant

== Styles, subjects and media ==
Sea by Nathan Oliveira, 1959, Honolulu Museum of Art

Although Oliveira is often associated with the Bay Area Figurative Movement, he was aesthetically independent. He felt that his paintings had been also strongly influenced by the work of Willem de Kooning, Alberto Giacometti and Francis Bacon. Prior to and during his years in art college, he viewed and was influenced by retrospectives of the European Expressionist masters Oskar Kokoschka, Edvard Munch, and Max Beckmann at the M.H. de Young Memorial Museum. He once stated: "I'm not part of the avant-garde. I'm part of the garde that comes afterward, assimilates, consolidates, refines."

Oliveira established an early reputation for his depictions of isolated figures painted in an improvisational style. Over time his subjects and style varied tremendously, as he created images of animals, birds of prey, human heads, masks, nudes, and still lifes of fetish objects. Oliveira also developed a series of "sites" that told the story of an invented culture with shamanic characteristics. Most of the artist's paintings are either vividly colored but somber human figures, or abstract expressionist works that vaguely resemble seascapes. Sea from 1959, in the collection of the Honolulu Museum of Art, is an example of these almost abstract seascapes.

During his lifetime Oliveira made notable works in a huge range of media, including oil paintings, acrylic paintings on paper, drawings in ink, charcoal and pencil, lithographs, etchings, posters, and sculptures in clay, wax and bronze. Oliveira was especially noted for his work in the monotype medium, in which single printed impressions are made from a painting executed on a metal plate. He was also an accomplished sculptor. A survey of Oliveira's bronzes was held at the Palo Alto Art Center in 2008. His work is in the di Rosa Collection.

== Auction record ==
A 1960 oil painting by Nathan Oliveira, Seated Figure with Pink Background, sold for $317,500 (including buyer's premium) at Sotheby's New York on November 12, 2002.

== Windhover Contemplative Center ==
During the 1990s Oliveira worked on a series of paintings of catenary curves based on observation of the flight of birds, including kestrels that had hovered outside the windows of his studio in the Stanford Hills. This series was dubbed the "Windhover" series by Oliveira's friend, poet Desmond Egan. He made parallels between the paintings and the 1877 Gerard Manley Hopkins poem "The Windhover."

In June 2013 Stanford University started construction of the "Windhover Contemplative Center," a 4,000-square-foot, one-story building to house four paintings from Oliveira's Windhover series. The center, intended to provide Stanford faculty, staff and students with a place to reflect and meditate, was envisioned by Oliveira and his wife Ramona prior to their deaths.

Designed by Aidlin Darling Design architects, the Windhover opened on October 9, 2014. It is located in front of Roble Hall. Constructed with rammed earth and wooden walls, the center features three interior rooms to house the Oliveira paintings. Outside landscaping includes a reflection pool and garden areas for meditation. The building is enclosed in glass, allowing for viewing of the Oliveira paintings even from outside. The center is open to the Stanford community daily from 11 a.m. to 11 p.m. A Stanford I.D. card is required to enter.

Docents from the Cantor Arts Center lead tours for the public on Saturdays. Visitors are asked to refrain from using cell phones, tablets, laptops and other electronic devices while inside the center.

== Death ==
Nathan Oliveira died at his home in Stanford, California on November 13, 2010. A memorial service for him was held at Stanford Memorial Church on January 12, 2011.

== See also ==
- Bay Area Figurative School
