= San Francisco Art Institute =

Former art school in San Francisco, California

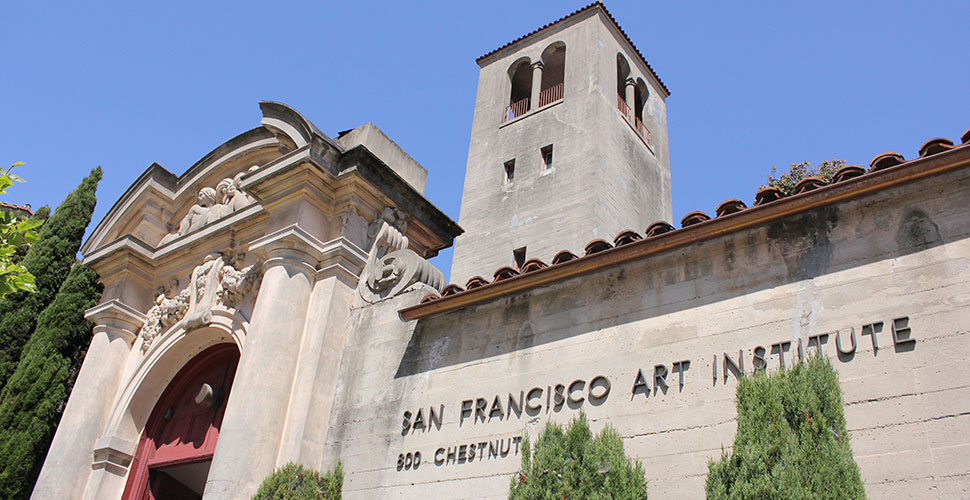
- Former names: California School of Design, Mark Hopkins Institute of Art, California School of Fine Arts
- Type: Private art school
- Active: 1871–2022
- Chairman: Lonnie Graham
- Interim Chief Operating Officer: Mark Kushner
- Students: 332
- Location: San Francisco, California, United States; 37.803456°N 122.417144°W
- Campus: Urban 4 acres (1.6 ha)
- Colors: Gray and clear
- Mascot: Fog
- Website: sfailegacyarchive.org

San Francisco Designated Landmark
- Designated: 1977
- Reference no.: 85

San Francisco Art Institute (SFAI) (1871–2022), was a private college of contemporary art in San Francisco, California. Founded in 1871, SFAI was one of the oldest art schools in the United States and the oldest west of the Mississippi River. Approximately 220 undergraduates and 112 graduate students were enrolled in 2021. The institution was accredited by the Western Association of Schools and Colleges (WASC) and the National Association of Schools of Art and Design (NASAD), and was a member of the Association of Independent Colleges of Art and Design (AICAD). The school closed permanently in July 2022.

== History ==
=== 19th century ===
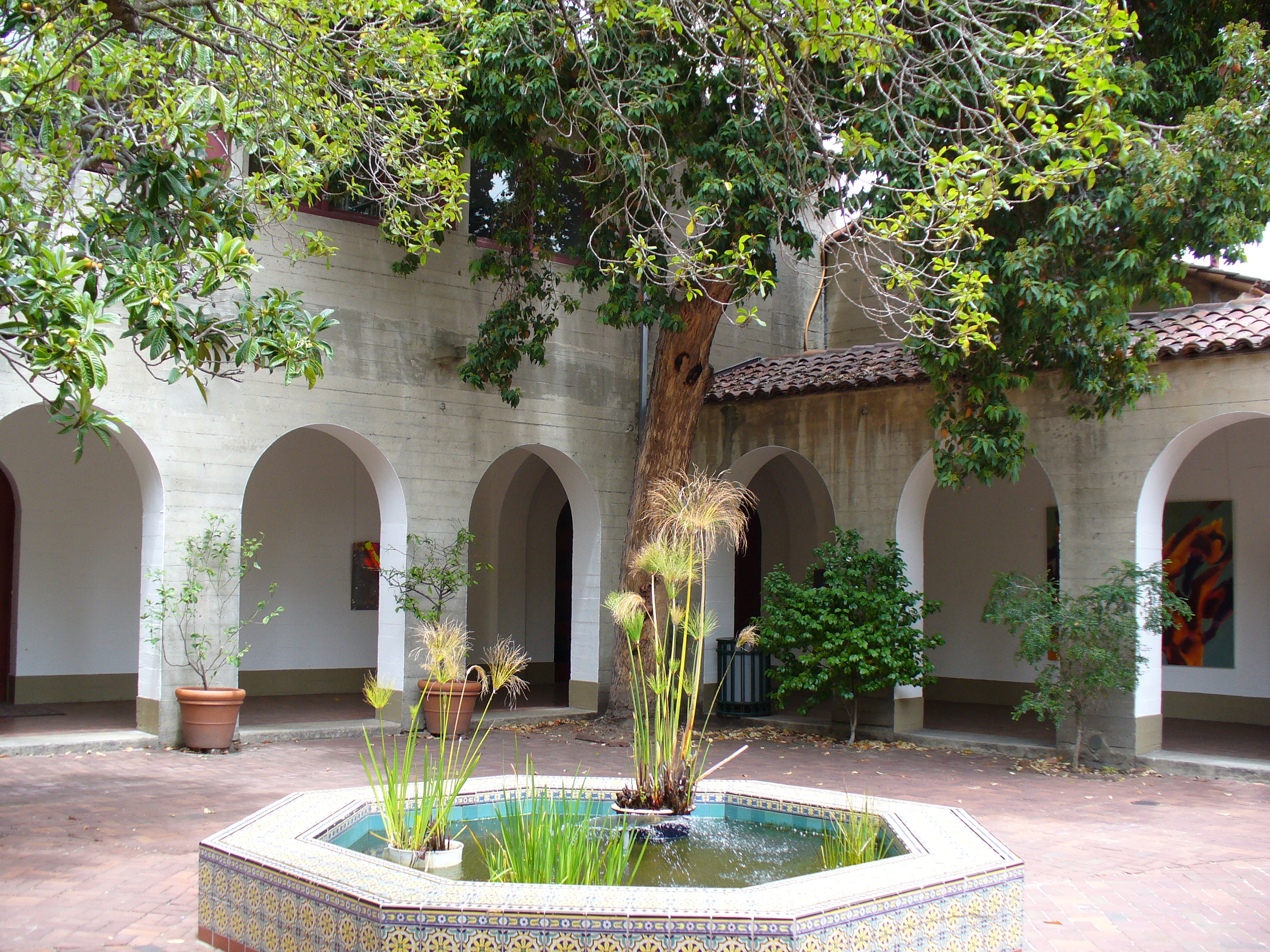
The courtyard

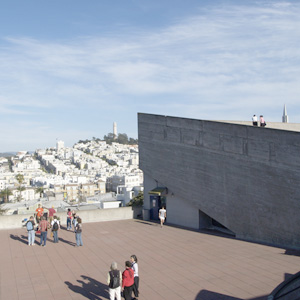
The roof terrace at SFAI's Chestnut Street Campus offered a scenic view over the city.

The San Francisco Art Institute originated in 1871 as the San Francisco Art Association (SFAA). Founded by a select group of artists, writers, and community leaders, most notably, led by Virgil Macey Williams, the first president Juan B. Wandesforde, with B.P. Avery, Edward Bosqui, Thomas Hill, and S.W. Shaw, the association sought to promote California art and artists. Their objective was to establish a school and museum to advance and preserve what they identified as a new and distinct artistic tradition, shaped by the cultural isolation and unique landscape of the American West.

By 1874, the SFAA had 700 regular members and 100 life members and had raised sufficient funds and the necessary momentum to launch an art school, which was named the California School of Design (CSD). Painter Virgil Macy Williams, who had spent nearly ten years studying with master painters in Italy and had taught at Harvard College before coming to San Francisco, became the school's first director and painting instructor—positions he held until his sudden death in 1886. During Williams' tenure, the CSD developed a national reputation and amassed a significant collection of early California and western fine art as the foundation collected for a planned museum.

In 1893, Edward Searles donated the Hopkins Mansion, one of the most palatial and elaborate Victorian mansions ever built, to the University of California in trust for the SFAA for "instruction in and illustration of the fine arts, music and literature." Named the Mark Hopkins Institute of Art, it housed both the CSD's campus and SFAA's art collection. Through this new affiliation, students of the University of California were able to enroll in classes at the CSD.

=== 20th century ===
In 1906, the devastating fire following the San Francisco earthquake destroyed the Mark Hopkins Institute of Art building, and the CSD and SFAA facilities, records and art collection. At the time, the replacement value of the building and its contents was estimated at $2.573 million. However, the combined amount of numerous insurance policies yielded less than $100,000 for rebuilding. Nevertheless, within a year, the SFAA built a new but comparatively modest campus in the same location, and adopted the name San Francisco Institute of Art.

In 1916, the SFAA merged with the San Francisco Society of Artists and assumed directorship of the San Francisco Museum of Art at the Palace of Fine Arts, which was established to host the 1915 World's Fair, Panama–Pacific International Exposition. In addition, the school was renamed the California School of Fine Arts (CSFA) to better reflect its mission to promote, develop and preserve regional art and culture. In 1926 the school moved to 800 Chestnut Street, which remained the school's main campus. In 1930 Mexican muralist Diego Rivera was hired to paint The Making of a Fresco Showing the Building of a City, which is located in the Diego Rivera Gallery.

During its first 60 years, influential artists associated with the school included Eadweard Muybridge, photographer and pioneer of motion graphics; Maynard Dixon, painter of San Francisco's labor movement and of the landscape of the West; Henry Kiyama, whose Four Immigrants Manga was the first graphic novel published in the U.S.; Sargent Claude Johnson, one of the first African-American artists from California to achieve a national reputation; Louise Dahl-Wolfe, an innovative photographer whose work for Harper's Bazaar in the 1930s defined a new American style of "environmental" fashion photography; Gutzon Borglum, the creator of the large-scale public sculpture known as Mount Rushmore; Rudolf Hess, German Expressionist painter and art critic, Emily Carr, Modernist Canadian painter well known for her work with indigenous culture, and numerous others.

After World War II ended (1945) the school became a nucleus for Abstract Expressionism, with faculty including Clyfford Still, Ad Reinhardt, Mark Rothko, David Park, Elmer Bischoff, and Clay Spohn. Although painting and sculpture remained the dominant mediums for many years, photography had also been among the course offerings. In 1945, Ansel Adams founded the school's photography department, which is considered the first fine-art photography department in the United States. The faculty hired during this time included Dorothea Lange, Imogen Cunningham, Minor White, Edward Weston, and Lisette Model. Sidney Peterson began teaching film courses at the school in 1947. These were the first noncommercial film classes taught at any institution. The Film Department was officially established later, in 1969. In 1949, Director Douglas MacAgy hosted the "Western Roundtable on Modern Art," a conference meant to discuss the state of art at that time. Participants included architect Frank Lloyd Wright, philosopher Gregory Bateson, artists Marcel Duchamp and Mark Tobey, art historian Robert Goldwater, and composers Darius Milhaud and Arnold Schoenberg.

By the early 1950s, San Francisco's North Beach had become the West Coast center of the Beat Movement, and music, poetry, and discourse were an intrinsic part of artists' lives. Collage artist Jess Collins renounced a career as a plutonium developer and enrolled at SFAI as a painting student. In 1953 he and his partner, poet Robert Duncan, along with painter Harry Jacobus, started the King Ubu Gallery, an important alternative space for art, poetry, and music.

A distinctly Californian modern art soon emerged that fused abstraction, figuration, narrative, and jazz. SFAI faculty David Park, Elmer Bischoff, James Weeks, James Kelly, Frank Lobdell, and Richard Diebenkorn were now the leaders of the Bay Area Figurative Movement, informed by their experience of seeing local museum exhibitions of work by Edvard Munch, Max Beckmann, Edgar Degas, and Henri Toulouse-Lautrec. Students at the school, including David Simpson, John Hultberg, William T. Wiley, Robert Hudson, William Allan, Joan Brown, Manuel Neri, Carlos Villa, and Wally Hedrick, continued the investigation of new ideas and new materials, many becoming the core of the Funk art movement.

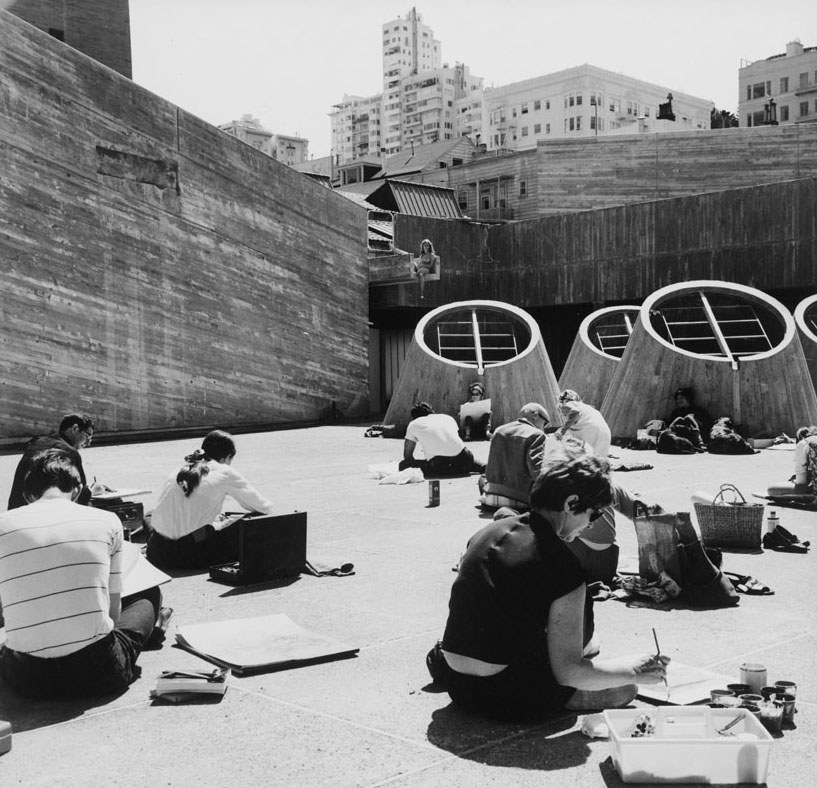
San Francisco Art Institute roof

Renamed San Francisco Art Institute in 1961, SFAI rejected the distinction between fine and applied arts. SFAI stood at the forefront of recognizing an expanded vocabulary of art-making that hybridized many practices including performance, conceptual art, new media, graphic arts, typography, and political and social documentary. Students in the early to mid-1960s included artists Ronald Davis, Robert Graham, Forrest Myers, Leo Valledor, Michael Heizer, Ronnie Landfield, Peter Reginato, Gary Stephan, and John Duff and in the late 1960s Annie Leibovitz, who would soon begin photographing for Rolling Stone magazine; Paul McCarthy, well known for his performance and sculpture works; and Charles Bigelow, who would be among the first typographers to design fonts for computers. Alumni Ruth-Marion Baruch and Pirkle Jones documented the early days of the Black Panther Party in northern California.

In 1969, a new addition to the building by Paffard Keatinge-Clay added 22,500 sq ft (2,090 m^{2}) of studio space, a large theater/lecture hall, an outdoor amphitheater, galleries, and a cafe.

Installation art, video, music, and social activism continued to inform much of the work of faculty and students in the 1970s and 1980s. The faculty during this period included George Kuchar, Gunvor Nelson, Howard Fried, Paul Kos, Angela Davis, Kathy Acker, Robert Colescott, and many other influential artists and writers. Among the students were a number of performance artists and musicians, including Karen Finley, whose performances challenged notions of femininity and political power, and Prairie Prince and Michael Cotten, who presented their first performance as the Tubes in the SFAI lecture hall, and became pioneers in the field of music video. The school became a hub for the Punk music scene, with bands such as the Mutants, the Avengers, and Romeo Void all started by SFAI students. Technology also became part of art practice: faculty Sharon Grace's Send/Receive project used satellite communications to create an interactive transcontinental performance, while Survival Research Laboratories, founded by student Mark Pauline, began staging large-scale outdoor performances of ritualized interactions among machines, robots, and pyrotechnics.

Since the 1990s the studio and classroom have become increasingly connected to the world via public art and community actions. As students at SFAI, Barry McGee, Aaron Noble, and Rigo 23, among others, were part of the movement known as the Mission School, taking their graffiti-inspired art to the streets and walls of the city. Faculty and students have created site-specific projects in locations from the San Francisco waterfront (Ann Chamberlain and Walter Hood's monument to the Abraham Lincoln Brigade) to the U.S. Consulate in Tijuana, Mexico (a sculpture by artist Pedro Reyes and SFAI students for the U.S. Department of State's Art in Embassies program). Organizations like Artists' Television Access (ATA) and Root Division, founded by alumni, and SFAI's City Studio program engage and educate local communities and cultivate a vital artistic ecosystem.

The school's history was recognized in 2016, when its campus was listed on the National Register of Historic Places.

== Closure ==
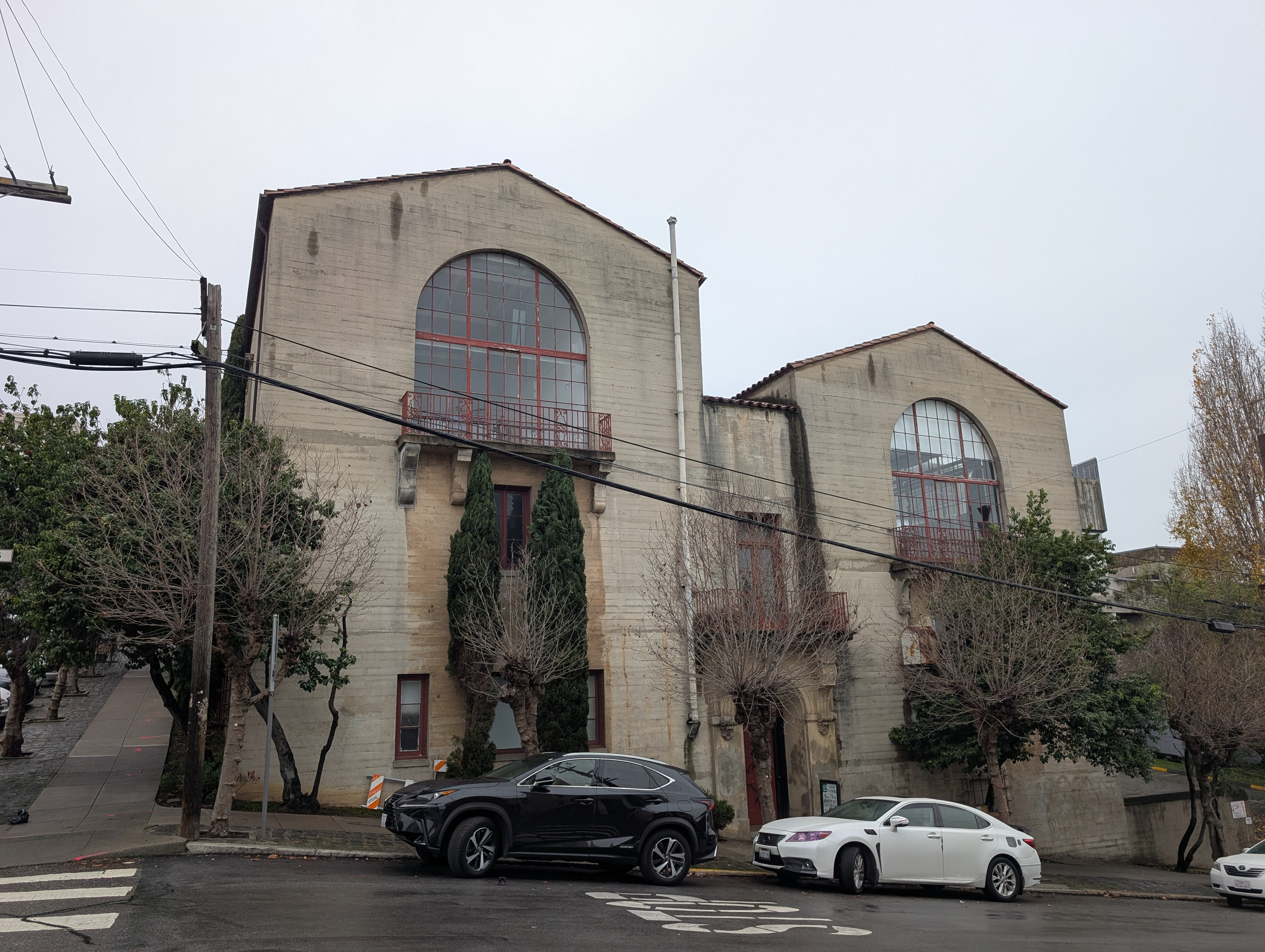
The San Francisco Art Institute in December 2024.

Due to long-term financial mismanagement, declining enrollment, high real estate costs, and reliance on income from campus property rentals—which was affected by the COVID-19 pandemic—SFAI's financial crisis worsened amid debt from a $19.7 million bank loan for the ill-conceived expansion and renovation of a second campus at Fort Mason, a property the school had secured with a sixty-year lease in 2015. Unable to meet fundraising goals, SFAI announced on March 23, 2020, that it would stop accepting new students for the following fall semester, marking its 149th birthday three days later, on Thursday, March 26, 2020.

Briefly SFAI announced the cancellation of the fall 2020 semester before reversing their decision and allowing for online and offline classes through the 2020–21 school year. In July 2020, after securing $4 million in donations, the board and administration announced an agreement had been reached to retain all tenured faculty for the coming academic year, resulting in the continuation of courses for the following academic year and the reinstatement of the degree program for those within a year of graduation.

In October 2020, a temporary solution occurred when the Regents of the University of California—which owned the land beneath the school's Russian Hill campus—agreed to purchase its $19.7 million debt from a private bank, preventing the foreclosure on SFAI's 800 Chestnut campus and turning the Regents into the school's landlord, with a rent-to-own six-year repayment structure designed to help SFAI recover.

In January 2021, in an attempt to find more funds to keep the school afloat, the SFAI Board of Trustees hatched a plan to sell the 1931 Diego Rivera mural, The Making of a Fresco Showing the Building of a City, valued at $50 million, to Star Wars filmmaker George Lucas for his Lucas Museum of Narrative Art in Los Angeles. After objections from alumni, staff, faculty, and community members, the plan was thwarted by the San Francisco Board of Supervisors, who unanimously voted to designate the mural a city landmark. While a sale was technically still possible, the status meant the mural could not be removed or significantly altered without the city’s Historic Preservation Commission's approval.

In February 2022 the University of San Francisco (USF) and SFAI announced that they had entered into an agreement to study the acquisition of SFAI by USF. Then, in July, after 5 months of due diligence, USF officially decided not to merge with the SFAI, citing insurmountable financial liabilities, poor enrollment projections, and extensive deferred maintenance as reasons the deal was not feasible.After the failed merger attempt with USF, the San Francisco Art Institute ceased all course and degree programs and held its final commencement and graduation ceremony on July 12, 2022. In August, a new nonprofit, SFAI Legacy Foundation + Archive (SFAI LF+A), was created as a separate entity from the SFAI fine arts college to protect the school’s name and historical artifacts and preserve SFAI's history.

On April 26, 2023, the San Francisco Art Institute filed for Chapter 7 liquidation. The campus was put up for sale in late June, with an announcement that Diego Rivera's mural in the Diego Rivera Gallery, The Making of a Fresco, Showing the Building of a City, with an assessed value of $50 million, would be sold as part of the property unless no satisfactory offer is received, in which case it might be available for separate sale.

In late February 2024, a nonprofit corporation endowed by Laurene Powell Jobs bought the campus, including the mural, for approximately $30 million, with the stated intention of continuing its use as an arts institution. It is planned to house the California Academy of Studio Arts, which will offer free one-year study residencies to 30 emerging visual artists.

== Academics ==
SFAI offered Bachelor of Arts (BA), Bachelor of Fine Arts (BFA), Master of Arts (MA), and Master of Fine Arts (MFA) degrees. SFAI also offered Low-Residency MFAs and Post-Baccalaureate certificates in Studio Art.

=== Photography ===
Founded by Ansel Adams in 1945, the Photography Department became the first program of its kind In the United States dedicated to exploring photography as a fine-art medium. Adams designed the school's darkrooms and attracted photographers for the original faculty, including Dorothea Lange, Imogen Cunningham, Minor White, and Morley Baer, who became Head of the Department after White's departure in 1953.

=== Painting ===
Throughout the SFAI Painting Department's history, it had been home to celebrated artists such as Clyfford Still, Mark Rothko, Hassel Smith, Richard Diebenkorn, Jay DeFeo, Fred Martin, Bruce McGaw, Elmer Bischoff, David Park, David Simpson, Frank Lobdell, Roy De Forest, Joan Brown, Ronald Davis, William T. Wiley, Toba Khedoori, Barry McGee, Inez Storer and Kehinde Wiley among others and was central to movements such as Abstract Expressionism, Bay Area Figuration, Color Field, California Funk, and the Mission School.

=== New Genres ===
Howard Fried founded the performance and video department (which later became New Genres) at the San Francisco Art Institute. In the late 1970s, a long-lost collection of Eadweard Muybridge photographs was found and an auction of the materials financed the creation of the department — and the purchase of two Portopak cameras. (More than a century before, the English artist had presented the first ever public showing of moving pictures on campus and apparently left something behind.)

=== Music ===
Among the many artist musicians who studied at SFAI are Jerry Garcia, guitarist in Grateful Dead; Dave Getz, drummer for Big Brother and the Holding Company and Country Joe and the Fish; Prairie Prince of The Tubes; Debora Iyall of Romeo Void; Freddy (aka Fritz) of the Mutants; Penelope Houston of the Avengers, Courtney Love, actress and rock musician; Jonathan Holland of Tussle; Devendra Banhart.

== Housing ==
In summer 2010, SFAI moved its housing program to two locations in Nob Hill: Sutter Hall at 717 Sutter Street, and Abby Hall at 630 Geary Street. In spring 2020, the housing program was dissolved due to financial exigency.

== Exhibitions and public programs ==
Students were given direct access to exhibitions, lectures, symposia, films, and other unique interdisciplinary events. An integral part of campus life, such events connected students to the larger community of artists, art, and contemporary ideas. The Walter and McBean Galleries (on the 800 Chestnut Street campus) house exhibitions, workshops, and other alternative and experimental avenues for presenting work by international contemporary artists. Students also had the opportunity to display their work in a number of spots on SFAI's two campuses, including the Diego Rivera Gallery.

=== Adaline Kent Award ===
Former board member (1947–1957), Adaline Kent was a sculptor and alumni of the school. Upon her death in 1957, she bequeathed $10,000 for the establishment of an annual award for a promising California Artist. Each year since 1957 the prize was awarded by the San Francisco Art Institute Artists' Committee. Winners included Ron Nagle (1978), Wally Hedrick (1985), Mildred Howard (1991), Clare Rojas (2004), and as the final award, Scott Williams (2005).

== See also ==
- Academy of Art University
- American Conservatory Theater
- The Art Institute of California – San Francisco
- California College of the Arts
- List of colleges and universities in California
- University of the Arts (Philadelphia)
- List of San Francisco Designated Landmarks
- Index of San Francisco Art Institute Alumni
- Diego Rivera Gallery
