= Elmer Bischoff =

American painter (1916–1991)

- Born: July 8, 1916; California, US
- Died: March 2, 1991 (aged 74)
- Education: University of California
- Known for: Painting
- Movement: Bay Area Figurative Movement
- Spouse: Adelie Landis Bischoff

Elmer Bischoff, Yellow Lampshade, 1969, De Young Museum, San Francisco

Elmer Nelson Bischoff (July 9, 1916 – March 2, 1991), was an American visual artist, from the San Francisco Bay Area. Bischoff, along with Richard Diebenkorn and David Park, was part of the post-World War II generation of artists who started as abstract painters and found their way back to figurative art.

== Biography ==
Elmer Bischoff, second child of John and Elna (née Nelson) Bischoff, and grew up in Berkeley, California. He was a second-generation Californian, the son of a father of German descent, and a mother of mixed Swedish-Ecuadorian origin.

He entered the University of California, Berkeley, in September 1934, completing his master's degree in May 1939, and immediately started teaching art at Sacramento High School (1939–41). During his years at university, one teacher had influenced him most: the highly independent-minded Margaret Peterson (artist), whose total dedication to her teaching, and insistence on the ethical value of art, were to have a great impact on the artist Elmer Bischoff would be. World War II, however, was to change Bischoff's life. In 1941, he served as a lieutenant colonel in intelligence services of the United States Army Air Forces in England, stationing near Oxford, and only coming back to the US in November 1945.

After the war, back in San Francisco, Bischoff found himself once more in the midst of avant-garde artistic ebullience - mixing, among other painters (and to name but two), with such artists as Mark Rothko and Clyfford Still. In January 1946, a golden opportunity was offered him: one of his artist friends, Karl Kasten (himself a war veteran, like Bischoff) suggested Bischoff as art teacher for a position still available, at San Francisco's California School of Fine Arts. It was then that Bischoff entered a faculty which already included some of the most talented new artists of post-war America. It is there that he eventually met David Park and Richard Diebenkorn. In 1973, Bischoff was elected into the National Academy of Design as an Associate member, and became a full member in 1985.

While distinct from expressionist art that came from Europe, art of the Bay Area Figurative Movement displays the immediacy and warmth that one sees in abstract expressionist painting. Elmer Bischoff was older than Diebenkorn, and he had experiences in the world that led to his taking an independent turn in painting. Bischoff's quiet and lyrical paintings were serious in a different way from the painting which was being taken seriously at the time; and which saw the rise of Abstract expressionism.

A retrospective of Elmer Bischoff's work, Grand Lyricist: The Art of Elmer Bischoff, was offered by the Oakland Museum of California, November 3, 2001- January 13, 2002. The Crocker Art Museum (California), the de Young Museum, the Hirshhorn Museum and Sculpture Garden (Washington D.C.), the Honolulu Museum of Art, the Kemper Museum of Contemporary Art (Kansas City, Missouri), the Museum of the National Academy of Design (New York City), the Museum of Fine Arts, Houston (Texas), the Oklahoma City Museum of Art, the Orange County Museum of Art, The Phillips Collection (Washington D.C.), the San Francisco Museum of Modern Art, and the Smithsonian American Art Museum (Washington D.C.) are among the public collections holding works by Elmer Bischoff.

Bischoff was the father of composer John Bischoff.

== See also ==
- Bay Area Figurative Movement
