= Richard Diebenkorn =

American painter and printmaker

- Richard Diebenkorn in 1986
- Born: Richard Clifford Diebenkorn Jr. April 22, 1922; Portland, Oregon, US
- Died: March 30, 1993 (aged 70); Berkeley, California, US
- Known for: Painting
- Movement: Bay Area Figurative Movement, abstract expressionism, Color Field painting, lyrical abstraction
- Spouse(s): Phyllis Antoinette Gilman (m. 1943); 2 childen

Richard Clifford Diebenkorn Jr. (April 22, 1922 – March 30, 1993) was an American painter and printmaker. His early work is associated with abstract expressionism and the Bay Area Figurative Movement of the 1950s and 1960s. In the late 1960s, he began his extensive series of geometric, lyrical abstract paintings. Known as the Ocean Park paintings, these paintings were instrumental to his achievement of worldwide acclaim.

Art critic Michael Kimmelman described Diebenkorn as "one of the premier American painters of the postwar era, whose deeply lyrical abstractions evoked the shimmering light and wide-open spaces of California, where he spent virtually his entire life."

== Early life ==
Richard Clifford Diebenkorn Jr. was born on April 22, 1922, in Portland, Oregon. His family moved to San Francisco, California, when he was two years old. By the age of four or five he had begun drawing often.

== Education and military service ==
In 1940, Diebenkorn entered Stanford University, where he met his first two artistic mentors, professor and muralist Victor Arnautoff, who guided Diebenkorn in classical formal discipline with oil paint, and Daniel Mendelowitz, with whom he shared a passion for the work of Edward Hopper. Hopper's influence can be seen in Diebenkorn's representational work of this time. While attending Stanford, Diebenkorn visited the home of Sarah Stein, the sister-in-law of Gertrude Stein, and first saw the works of European modernist masters Cézanne, Picasso, and Matisse. The beginning of the United States's involvement in World War II interrupted Diebenkorn's education at Stanford, and he was not able complete his degree at that time. Diebenkorn entered the United States Marine Corps in 1943, where he served until 1945.

While enlisted, Diebenkorn continued to study art and expanded his knowledge of European modernism, first while enrolled briefly at the University of California, Berkeley, and later on the East Coast, while stationed at the Marine base in Quantico, Virginia. While enrolled at Berkeley he had three influential teachers: Worth Ryder, Erle Loran, and Eugene Neuhaus. Both Ryder and Erle Loran had studied art in Europe in the 1920s and brought their first-hand knowledge of European modernism to their teaching. Neuhaus emigrated from Germany in 1904 and was a seminal figure in establishing the Bay Area as a center of art appreciation and education on the West Coast.

On the East Coast, when he transferred to the base in Quantico, Diebenkorn took advantage of his location to visit art museums in Washington, DC, Philadelphia, and New York City. This allowed him to study in person the paintings of modern masters such as Pierre Bonnard, Georges Braque, Henri Matisse, Joan Miró, and Pablo Picasso. Also at this time, he had his first exposure to the new New York–based artists who were beginning their abstract Surrealism-based paintings. The work of Robert Motherwell, in particular, left an impression. Diebenkorn began his own experiments in abstract painting.

In 1945, Diebenkorn was scheduled to deploy to Japan; however, with the war's end in August 1945, he was discharged and returned to life in the Bay Area.

== Career ==
During the late 1940s and early 1950s, Diebenkorn lived and worked in various places: San Francisco and Sausalito (1946–47 and 1947–1950), Woodstock, New York (1947), Albuquerque, New Mexico (1950–1952), Urbana, Illinois (1952–53), and Berkeley, California (1953–1966). He developed his own style of abstract expressionist painting.

After World War II, the art world's focus shifted from the School of Paris to the United States and, in particular, to the New York School. In 1946, Diebenkorn enrolled as a student in the California School of Fine Arts (CSFA) in San Francisco (now known as the San Francisco Art Institute), which was developing its own vigorous style of abstract expressionism. In 1947, after ten months in Woodstock on an Alfred Bender travel grant, Diebenkorn returned to the CSFA, where he adopted abstract expressionism as his vehicle for self-expression. He was offered a place on the CSFA faculty in 1947 and taught there until 1950. He was influenced at first by Clyfford Still, who also taught at the CSFA from 1946 to 1950, Arshile Gorky and Willem de Kooning. Diebenkorn became a leading abstract expressionist on the West Coast. From 1950 to 1952, Diebenkorn was enrolled under the G.I. Bill in the University of New Mexico’s graduate fine arts department, where he continued to adapt his abstract expressionist style.

For the academic year 1952–53, Diebenkorn took a faculty position at the University of Illinois in Urbana, where he taught painting and drawing. In November and December 1952, he had his first solo exhibit at a commercial art gallery, the Paul Kantor Gallery in Los Angeles.

In September 1953, Diebenkorn moved to back to the San Francisco Bay Area from New York City, where he had spent the summer. He took a position at California College of Arts and Crafts in 1955, teaching until 1958.

He established his home in Berkeley and lived there until 1966. During the first few years of this period, Diebenkorn abandoned his strict adherence to abstract expressionism and began to work in a more representational style. By the mid-1950s, Diebenkorn had become an important figurative painter, in a style that bridged Henri Matisse and abstract expressionism. Diebenkorn, Elmer Bischoff, Henry Villierme, David Park, James Weeks, and others participated in a renaissance of figurative painting, dubbed the Bay Area Figurative Movement. His subject matter during this period included interiors, landscapes, still lifes, and the human figure. Diebenkorn began to have a measure of success with his artwork during this period. He was included in several group shows and had several solo exhibits.

In 1960, a mid-career retrospective was presented by the Pasadena Art Museum (now the Norton Simon Museum). That autumn, a variation of the show moved to the California Palace of the Legion of Honor in San Francisco.

In the summer of 1961, while a visiting instructor at UCLA, Diebenkorn first became acquainted with printmaking when his graduate assistant introduced him to the printmaking technique of drypoint. Also while in Southern California, Diebenkorn was a guest at the Tamarind Lithography Workshop (now the Tamarind Institute), where he worked on a suite of prints completed in 1962.

Upon his return to Berkeley in the fall of 1961, Diebenkorn began seriously exploring drypoint and printmaking with Kathan Brown at her newly established fine arts printing press, Crown Point Press. In 1965, Crown Point Press printed and published an edition of thirteen bound volumes and twelve unbound folios of Diebenkorn's first suite of prints, 41 Etchings Drypoints. This project was the first publication of Crown Point's catalog. (Diebenkorn did not continue doing any further etching until 1977, when he and Brown renewed their artistic relationship. From then until 1992, Diebenkorn returned almost yearly to Crown Point Press to produce work)

Also in the fall of 1961, Diebenkorn became a faculty member at the San Francisco Art Institute, where he taught periodically until 1966. He also taught intermittently during these years at a number of other colleges, including the California College of Arts and Crafts and Mills College in Oakland, the University of Southern California (USC), the University of Colorado, Boulder, and the University of California, Los Angeles (UCLA).

In September 1963, Diebenkorn was named the first artist-in-residence at Stanford University in Palo Alto, California, an appointment that lasted until June 1964. His only responsibility in this position was to produce art in a studio provided by the university. Students were allowed to visit him in the studio during scheduled times. Though he created a few paintings during his time at Stanford, he produced many drawings. Stanford presented an extensive show of these drawings at the end of his residency.

From fall 1964 to spring 1965, Diebenkorn traveled through Europe, and he was granted a cultural visa to visit important Soviet museums and view their holdings of Matisse's paintings. When he returned to painting in the Bay Area in mid-1965, his works summed up all he had learned from more than a decade as a leading figurative painter.

The Henri Matisse paintings French Window at Collioure, and View of Notre-Dame, both from 1914, exerted tremendous influence on Richard Diebenkorn's Ocean Park paintings. According to art historian Jane Livingston, Diebenkorn saw both Matisse paintings in an exhibition in Los Angeles in 1966, which enormously affected him and his work. Livingston said about the January 1966 Matisse exhibition that Diebenkorn saw in Los Angeles,

It is difficult not to ascribe enormous weight to this experience for the direction his work took from that time on. Two pictures he saw there reverberate in almost every Ocean Park canvas. View of Notre Dame and the French Window at Collioure, painted in 1914, were on view for the first time in the US.

Livingston said, "Diebenkorn must have experienced French Window at Collioure as an epiphany."

=== Santa Monica and Ocean Park series ===
In September 1966, Diebenkorn moved to Santa Monica, California, and took up a professorship at UCLA. He moved into a small studio space in the same building as his old friend from the Bay Area, Sam Francis. On the same block or nearby were the studios of James Turrell, Larry Bell, Robert Irwin, Vija Celmins, Billy Al Bengston, Maxwell Hendler, Ed Moses, Alexis Smith, Frank Gehry, Charles Arnoldi, Chris Burden, and Karen Carson. During this time, he lived in a house on Amalfi Drive in Santa Monica Canyon, where he would host an artist collective. In the winter of 1966–67, he returned to abstraction, this time in a distinctly personal, geometric style that departed from his early abstract expressionist period. The Ocean Park series, begun in 1967 and developed for the next 18 years, became his most famous work and resulted in approximately 135 paintings. Based on the aerial landscape and perhaps the view from his studio window, these large-scale abstract compositions were named after a community in Santa Monica, where he had his studio.

The Ocean Park series bridged his earlier abstract expressionist works with color field painting and lyrical abstraction. In 1973, Diebenkorn, finding the day-to-day academic and classroom duties unpleasant and burdensome, retired from UCLA to focus solely on his studio work.

Richard Diebenkorn, Ocean Park No. 67, 1973, oil on canvas, 100 × 81 in.

In February 1976 Diebenkorn moved to a new studio designed and built entirely to his specifications and located down the street from his previous location on Main Street in Santa Monica (Diebenkorn had purchased the empty lot there three years earlier). This move coincided with an increase in his stature nationally and internationally.

Throughout the late 1970’s and 80’s Diebenkorn had numerous gallery and museum exhibits and many other professional accolades including representing the United States at the 1978 Venice Biennale. While continuing on his Ocean Park paintings, Diebenkorn increased his creative exploration into other mediums and stylistic approaches. Notably, Diebenkorn did a concentrated series of drawings and prints featuring motifs based on Clubs and Spades (this motif had appeared sporadically in earlier pieces from his career as well). This work was a significant thematic break from the Ocean Park series. Diebenkorn did not produce any Ocean Park paintings from 1981–1983. He returned to creating paintings for that series in 1984. His final Ocean Park painting was completed in 1985.

In 1986, Diebenkorn decided to leave Santa Monica and Southern California. After traveling and looking around several different areas in the western United States, in 1988, Diebenkorn and his wife bought a 100-year old farmhouse, and settled in the Alexander Valley just outside of Healdsburg, California. This area in Sonoma County, in northern California, is rural, hilly farmland with an abundance of wine vineyards. He had the barn of the farmhouse redesigned into his new studio. As part of his Ocean Park series, Diebenkorn produced a set of color monotypes in collaboration with publisher and master printer Garner Tullis in 1988.

In 1989, he began suffering serious health issues related to heart disease. Though still producing prints, drawings, and smaller paintings, his poor health prevented him from completing larger paintings.

In 1990, Arion Press in San Francisco commissioned Diebenkorn to do a series of six etchings for its book Poems of W. B. Yeats, with poems selected and introduced by the esteemed literary scholar and university professor Helen Vendler. For five of the etchings of this project Diebenkorn focused on the subject of a coat, a recurrent theme throughout Yeats’ poetry, producing images that are in varying degrees abstractions on that theme. The sixth image is a double image of the map of Ireland.

In July 1991, Diebenkorn was awarded the National Medal of Arts by President George H. W. Bush.

== Death ==
In the later part of 1992, Diebenkorn, whose health had steadily worsened, moved with his wife to their Berkeley apartment to be nearer medical treatment. He was never able to return to Healdsburg after that. Diebenkorn died due to complications from emphysema in Berkeley on March 30, 1993.

== Personal life ==
At Stanford, Diebenkorn met his fellow student and future wife, Phyllis Antoinette Gilman. They married in 1943 and went on to have two children together, a daughter, Gretchen (1945), and a son, Christopher (1947).

== Exhibitions ==
Diebenkorn had his first show at the California Palace of the Legion of Honor in San Francisco 1948. The first important retrospective of his work took place at the Albright–Knox Art Gallery in Buffalo, New York, in 1976–77; the show, then traveled to Washington, DC, Cincinnati, Los Angeles, and Oakland. In 1989, John Elderfield, then a curator at the Museum of Modern Art in New York, organized a show of Diebenkorn's works on paper, which constituted an important part of his production.

In 1992, the Fundación Juan March, Madrid exhibited Richard Diebenkorn, the first show of Diebenkorn’s work in Europe. The exhibit consisted of over 50 paintings created between 1949 and 1985, including his Ocean Park series.

In 2008 The Phillips Collection exhibited Diebenkorn in New Mexico, an exhibition organized by The Harwood Museum of Art, Taos, of the University of New Mexico. The exhibit examined the works Diebenkorn created during his 30 months in New Mexico. During the exhibition’s run, The Phillips Collection also displayed its Diebenkorn works, including paintings from his renowned Berkeley and Ocean Park series.

In 2012, an exhibition, Richard Diebenkorn: The Ocean Park Series, curated by Sarah C. Bancroft, traveled to the Modern Art Museum of Fort Worth, the Orange County Museum of Art, and the Corcoran Gallery of Art in Washington, DC.

Major recent shows in the San Francisco Bay Area have included Diebenkorn: The Berkeley Years, July–September 2013, at the De Young Museum, San Francisco; an exhibition of small works, June 6–August 23, 2015, at the Sonoma Valley Museum of Art, Sonoma; and Matisse/Diebenkorn, a major show highlighting Matisses's influence on Richard Diebenkorn, March 11–May 29, 2017, at the San Francisco Museum of Modern Art.

== Collections ==
Diebenkorn's work can be found in a number of public collections including the New Mexico Museum of Art, Santa Fe, New Mexico; Honolulu Museum of Art, Honolulu, Hawaii; Albertina, Vienna, Austria; Albright–Knox Art Gallery, Buffalo, New York; Art Institute of Chicago, Chicago; Baltimore Museum of Art; Carnegie Institute, Pittsburgh; Corcoran Gallery of Art, Washington, D.C.; the de Young Museum, San Francisco; Kalamazoo Institute of Arts, Michigan, Hirshhorn Museum and Sculpture Garden, Washington, D.C.; Los Angeles County Museum of Art; Minneapolis Institute of Art; Museum of Fine Arts, Houston, Texas; Phillips Collection, Washington, D.C.; San Francisco Museum of Modern Art, San Francisco; Solomon R. Guggenheim Museum, New York; and the Whitney Museum of American Art, New York. The Iris & B. Gerald Cantor Center for Visual Arts at Stanford University is home to 29 of Diebenkorn's sketchbooks as well as a collection of paintings and other works on paper.

== Recognition ==
In 1978, Diebenkorn was awarded The Edward MacDowell Medal by The MacDowell Colony for outstanding contributions to American culture.

In 1991, Diebenkorn was awarded the National Medal of Arts. In 1979, he was elected into the National Academy of Design as an Associate member, and became a full Academician in 1982.

== Legacy ==
Richard Diebenkorn’s legacy has remained especially significant within postwar and contemporary American painting. His shift in the 1950s from abstraction to figuration was closely tied to the Bay Area Figurative Movement, alongside artists such as David Park and Elmer Bischoff, while later painters including Robert Bechtle cited Diebenkorn as a major influence. Bernice Bing studied under Diebenkorn at the California College of Arts and Crafts, and Henry Villierme was among the artists shaped by his teaching and later associated with Bay Area Figuration. In Southern California, Tony Berlant was part of Diebenkorn’s Santa Monica and UCLA orbit. Diebenkorn’s work has also continued to inform later artists, including geometric abstraction painter Amadour, whose writing and California Incline series position the Ocean Park paintings as an important precedent for contemporary abstractions of Santa Monica light, architecture, and coastal space.

== Art market ==
In 2018, Diebenkorn's Ocean Park #126 painted in 1984 became the most expensive picture by the artist auctioned when it went for $23.9 million at Christie's New York. The previous record from 2012, also at Christie's, was Ocean Park #48 painted in 1971 for $13.5 million. At a 2014 Sotheby's sale of Rachel Lambert Mellon's private collection, Italian fashion designer Valentino Garavani bought Ocean Park #89 (1975), an abstract image of a sunset, for $9.68 million.

Author William Benton made a painting in the style of Diebenkorn's Ocean Park for a friend who was a big admirer of the artist's work. At the back of the painting, Benton wrote a message signed with Diebenkorn's name. When the friend died in 1995, his estate was evaluated and an appraiser, not knowing the paintings provenance, marked the work as worth $50–60,000.

== Sources ==
- Jane Livingston, The Art of Richard Diebenkorn, with essays by John Elderfield, Ruth E. Fine, and Jane Livingston. The Whitney Museum of American Art, 1997, ISBN 0-520-21257-6
- Marika Herskovic, American Abstract Expressionism of the 1950s An Illustrated Survey, (New York School Press, 2003.) ISBN 0-9677994-1-4. p. 102–105
- Marika Herskovic, American Abstract and Figurative Expressionism: Style Is Timely Art Is Timeless. (New York School Press, 2009.) ISBN 978-0-9677994-2-1. p. 80–83
- Bancroft, Sarah, Richard Diebenkorn: The Ocean Park Series. Newport Beach: Orange County Museum of Art, 2012, ISBN 978-3-7913-5138-4
