= Abstract expressionism =

American post–World War II art movement

Additional media
- Years active: Late 1940s – early 1960s
- Location: United States, specifically New York City
- Major figures: Clyfford Still, Jackson Pollock, Willem de Kooning, Arshile Gorky, Mark Rothko, Lee Krasner, Robert Motherwell, Franz Kline, Adolph Gottlieb, David Smith, Hans Hofmann, Joan Mitchell, Elaine de Kooning
- Influences: Modernism, Expressionism (Wassily Kandinsky), Surrealism, Cubism, Dada

Abstract expressionism in the United States emerged as a distinct art movement in the aftermath of World War II and gained mainstream acceptance in the 1950s, a shift from the American social realism of the 1930s influenced by the Great Depression and Mexican muralists. The term was first applied to American art in 1946 by the art critic Robert Coates. Key figures in the New York School, which was the center of this movement, included such artists as Arshile Gorky, Jackson Pollock, Franz Kline, Mark Rothko, Norman Lewis, Willem de Kooning, Adolph Gottlieb, Clyfford Still, Robert Motherwell, Theodoros Stamos, Jack Tworkov, and Lee Krasner among others.

The movement was not limited to painting but included influential collagists and sculptors, such as David Smith, Louise Nevelson, and others. Abstract expressionism was notably influenced by the spontaneous and subconscious creation methods of Surrealist artists like André Masson and Max Ernst. Artists associated with the movement combined the emotional intensity of German Expressionism with the radical visual vocabularies of European avant-garde schools like Futurism, the Bauhaus, and Synthetic Cubism. Artist Paul Hultberg was noted as an innovator, producing large scale abstract expressionist murals using the unconventional medium of vitreous enamel on copper and steel, typically reserved for more diminutive works of jewelry and smaller plaques. He developed his own method for open air firing the enameled panels that were typically too large for kilns.

Abstract expressionism was seen as rebellious and idiosyncratic, encompassing various artistic styles. It was the first specifically American movement to achieve international influence and put New York City at the center of the Western art world, a role formerly filled by Paris. Contemporary art critics played a significant role in its development. Critics like Clement Greenberg and Harold Rosenberg promoted the work of artists associated with abstract expressionism, in particular Jackson Pollock, through their writing and collecting. Rosenberg's concept of the canvas as an "arena in which to act" was pivotal in defining the approach of action painters. The cultural reign of abstract expressionism in the United States had diminished by the early 1960s, while the subsequent rejection of the abstract expressionist emphasis on individualism led to the development of such movements as Pop art and Minimalism. Throughout the second half of the 20th century, the influence of abstract expressionism can be seen in diverse movements in the U.S. and Europe, including Tachisme and neo-expressionism, among others.

The term "abstract expressionism" is believed to have first been used in Germany in 1919 in the magazine Der Sturm in reference to German Expressionism. Alfred Barr used this term in 1929 to describe works by Wassily Kandinsky. The term was used in the United States in 1946 by Robert Coates in his review of 18 Hans Hofmann paintings.

== Style ==
An important predecessor is Surrealism, with its emphasis on spontaneous, automatic, or subconscious creation. Jackson Pollock's dripping paint onto a canvas laid on the floor is a technique that has its roots in the work of André Masson, Max Ernst, and David Alfaro Siqueiros. The newer research tends to put the exile-surrealist Wolfgang Paalen in the position of the artist and theoretician who fostered the theory of the viewer-dependent possibility space through his paintings and his magazine DYN. Paalen considered ideas of quantum mechanics, as well as idiosyncratic interpretations of the totemic vision and the spatial structure of native-Indian painting from British Columbia and prepared the ground for the new spatial vision of the young American abstracts. His long essay Totem Art (1943) had considerable influence on such artists as Martha Graham, Isamu Noguchi, Pollock, Mark Rothko and Barnett Newman. Around 1944 Barnett Newman tried to explain America's newest art movement and included a list of "the men in the new movement". Paalen is mentioned twice; other artists mentioned are Gottlieb, Rothko, Pollock, Hofmann, Baziotes, Gorky and others. Robert Motherwell is mentioned with a question mark. Another important early manifestation of what came to be abstract expressionism is the work of American Northwest artist Mark Tobey, especially his "white writing" canvases, which, though generally not large in scale, anticipate the "all-over" look of Pollock's drip paintings.

The movement's name is derived from the combination of the emotional intensity and self-denial of the German Expressionists with the anti-figurative aesthetic of the European abstract schools such as Futurism, the Bauhaus, and Synthetic Cubism. Additionally, it has an image of being rebellious, anarchic, highly idiosyncratic and, some feel, nihilistic. In practice, the term is applied to any number of artists working (mostly) in New York who had quite different styles, and even to work that is neither especially abstract nor expressionist. California abstract expressionist Jay Meuser, who typically painted in the non-objective style, wrote about his painting Mare Nostrum, "It is far better to capture the glorious spirit of the sea than to paint all of its tiny ripples." Pollock's energetic "action paintings", with their "busy" feel, are different, both technically and aesthetically, from the violent and grotesque Women series of Willem de Kooning's figurative paintings and the rectangles of color in Rothko's Color Field paintings (which are not what would usually be called expressionist, and which Rothko denied were abstract). Yet all four artists are classified as abstract expressionists.

Abstract expressionism has many stylistic similarities to the Russian artists of the early 20th century such as Wassily Kandinsky. Although it is true that spontaneity or the impression of spontaneity characterized many of the abstract expressionists' works, most of these paintings involved careful planning, especially since their large size demanded it. With artists such as Paul Klee, Kandinsky, Emma Kunz, and later on Rothko, Newman, and Agnes Martin, abstract art clearly implied expression of ideas concerning the spiritual, the unconscious, and the mind.

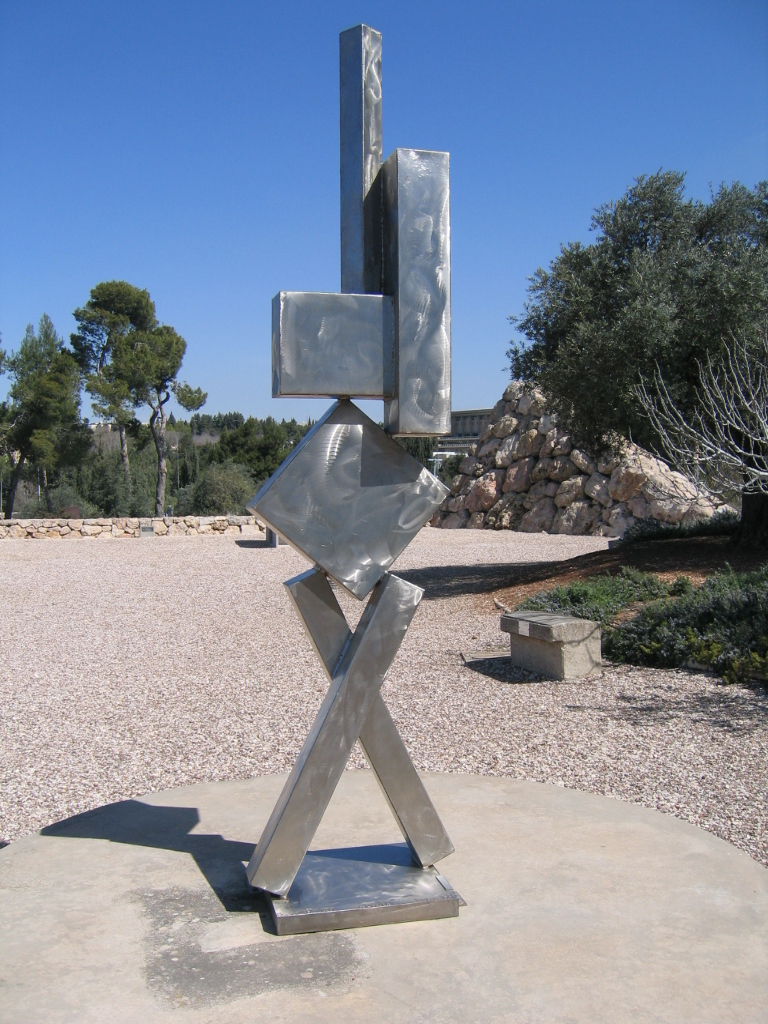
David Smith, Cubi VI (1963), Israel Museum, Jerusalem. David Smith was one of the most influential American sculptors of the 20th century.

Why this style gained mainstream acceptance in the 1950s is a matter of debate. American social realism had been the mainstream in the 1930s. It had been influenced not only by the Great Depression, but also by the Mexican muralists such as David Alfaro Siqueiros and Diego Rivera. The political climate after World War II did not long tolerate the social protests of these painters. Abstract expressionism arose during the war and began to be showcased during the early forties at galleries in New York such as The Art of This Century Gallery. The post-war McCarthy era was a time of artistic censorship in the United States, but if the subject matter were totally abstract then it would be seen as apolitical, and therefore safe. Or if the art was political, the message was largely for the insiders.

While the movement is closely associated with painting, collagist Anne Ryan and certain sculptors in particular were also integral to abstract expressionism. David Smith, and his wife Dorothy Dehner, Herbert Ferber, Isamu Noguchi, Ibram Lassaw, Theodore Roszak, Phillip Pavia, Mary Callery, Richard Stankiewicz, Louise Bourgeois, and Louise Nevelson in particular were some of the sculptors considered as being important members of the movement. In addition, the artists David Hare, John Chamberlain, James Rosati, Mark di Suvero, and sculptors Richard Lippold, Raoul Hague, George Rickey, Reuben Nakian, and even Tony Smith, Seymour Lipton, Joseph Cornell, and several others were integral parts of the abstract expressionist movement. Many of the sculptors listed participated in the Ninth Street Show, a famous exhibition curated by Leo Castelli on East Ninth Street in New York City in 1951. Besides the painters and sculptors of the period the New York School of abstract expressionism also generated a number of supportive poets, including Frank O'Hara and photographers such as Aaron Siskind and Fred McDarrah, (whose book The Artist's World in Pictures documented the New York School during the 1950s), and filmmakers—notably Robert Frank—as well.

Although the abstract expressionist school spread quickly throughout the United States, the epicenters of this style were New York City and the San Francisco Bay area of California.

== Art critics of the post–World War II era ==
At a certain moment the canvas began to appear to one American painter after another as an arena in which to act. What was to go on the canvas was not a picture but an event.

— Harold Rosenberg

In the 1940s there were not only few galleries (The Art of This Century, Pierre Matisse Gallery, Julien Levy Gallery and a few others) but also few critics who were willing to follow the work of the New York Vanguard. There were also a few artists with a literary background, among them Robert Motherwell and Barnett Newman, who functioned as critics as well.

While the New York avant-garde was still relatively unknown by the late 1940s, most of the artists who have become household names today had their well-established patron critics: Clement Greenberg advocated Jackson Pollock and the Color Field painters like Clyfford Still, Mark Rothko, Barnett Newman, Adolph Gottlieb and Hans Hofmann; Harold Rosenberg seemed to prefer the action painters such as Willem de Kooning and Franz Kline, as well as the seminal paintings of Arshile Gorky; Thomas B. Hess, the managing editor of ARTnews, championed Willem de Kooning.

The new critics elevated their protégés by casting other artists as "followers" or ignoring those who did not serve their promotional goal.

In 1958, Mark Tobey became the first American painter since Whistler (1895) to win top prize at the Venice Biennale.

Barnett Newman, Onement 1, 1948. During the 1940s Barnett Newman wrote several articles about the new American painting.

Barnett Newman, a late member of the Uptown Group, wrote catalogue forewords and reviews, and by the late 1940s became an exhibiting artist at Betty Parsons Gallery. His first solo show was in 1948. Soon after his first exhibition, Barnett Newman remarked in one of the Artists' Sessions at Studio 35: "We are in the process of making the world, to a certain extent, in our own image." Using his writing skills, Newman fought every step of the way to reinforce his newly established image as an artist and to promote his work. An example is his letter on April 9, 1955, "Letter to Sidney Janis: — it is true that Rothko talks the fighter. He fights, however, to submit to the philistine world. My struggle against bourgeois society has involved the total rejection of it."

Strangely, the person thought to have had most to do with the promotion of this style was a New York Trotskyist: Clement Greenberg. As long-time art critic for the Partisan Review and The Nation, he became an early and literate proponent of abstract expressionism. The well-heeled artist Robert Motherwell joined Greenberg in promoting a style that fit the political climate and the intellectual rebelliousness of the era.

Greenberg proclaimed abstract expressionism and Pollock in particular as the epitome of aesthetic value. He supported Pollock's work on formalistic grounds as simply the best painting of its day and the culmination of an art tradition going back via Cubism and Cézanne to Monet, in which painting became ever-'purer' and more concentrated in what was 'essential' to it, the making of marks on a flat surface.

Pollock's work has always polarised critics. Rosenberg spoke of the transformation of painting into an existential drama in Pollock's work, in which "what was to go on the canvas was not a picture but an event". "The big moment came when it was decided to paint 'just to paint'. The gesture on the canvas was a gesture of liberation from value—political, aesthetic, moral."

One of the most vocal critics of abstract expressionism at the time was The New York Times art critic John Canaday. Meyer Schapiro and Leo Steinberg along with Greenberg and Rosenberg were important art historians of the post-war era who voiced support for abstract expressionism. During the early-to-mid 1960s younger art critics Michael Fried, Rosalind Krauss, and Robert Hughes added considerable insights into the critical dialectic that continues to grow around abstract expressionism.

== History ==
=== World War II and the Post-War period ===
Richard Pousette-Dart, Symphony No. 1, The Transcendental, 1941–42

During the period leading up to and during World War II, modernist artists, writers, and poets, as well as important collectors and dealers, fled Europe and the onslaught of the Nazis for safe haven in the United States. Many of those who didn't flee perished. Among the artists and collectors who arrived in New York during the war (some with help from Varian Fry) were Hans Namuth, Yves Tanguy, Kay Sage, Max Ernst, Jimmy Ernst, Peggy Guggenheim, Leo Castelli, Marcel Duchamp, André Masson, Roberto Matta, André Breton, Marc Chagall, Jacques Lipchitz, Fernand Léger, and Piet Mondrian. A few artists, notably Picasso, Matisse, and Pierre Bonnard remained in France and survived.

The post-war period left the capitals of Europe in upheaval, with an urgency to economically and physically rebuild and to politically regroup. In Paris, formerly the center of European culture and capital of the art world, the climate for art was a disaster, and New York replaced Paris as the new center of the art world. Post-war Europe saw the continuation of Surrealism, Cubism, Dada, and the works of Matisse. Also in Europe, art brut, and lyrical abstraction or Tachisme (the European equivalent to abstract expressionism) took hold of the newest generation. Serge Poliakoff, Nicolas de Staël, Georges Mathieu, Vieira da Silva, Jean Dubuffet, Yves Klein, Pierre Soulages and Jean Messagier, among others are considered important figures in post-war European painting. In the United States, a new generation of American artists began to emerge and to dominate the world stage, and they were called abstract expressionists.

==== Gorky, Hofmann, and Graham ====
Arshile Gorky, The Liver Is the Cock's Comb (1944), oil on canvas, 73 1/4 × 98" (186 × 249 cm) Albright–Knox Art Gallery, Buffalo, New York. Gorky was an Armenian-born American painter who had a seminal influence on abstract expressionism. De Kooning said: "I met a lot of artists — but then I met Gorky. [...] He had an extraordinary gift for hitting the nail on the head; remarkable. So I immediately attached myself to him and we became very good friends."

The 1940s in New York City heralded the triumph of American abstract expressionism, a modernist movement that combined lessons learned from Matisse, Picasso, Surrealism, Miró, Cubism, Fauvism, and early Modernism via eminent educators in the United States, including Hans Hofmann from Germany and John D. Graham from Ukraine. Graham's influence on American art during the early 1940s was particularly visible in the work of Gorky, de Kooning, Pollock, and Richard Pousette-Dart among others. Gorky's contributions to American and world art are difficult to overestimate. His work as lyrical abstraction was a "new language. He "lit the way for two generations of American artists". The painterly spontaneity of mature works such as The Liver Is the Cock's Comb, The Betrothal II, and One Year the Milkweed immediately prefigured Abstract expressionism, and leaders in the New York School have acknowledged Gorky's considerable influence. The early work of Hyman Bloom was also influential. American artists also benefited from the presence of Piet Mondrian, Fernand Léger, Max Ernst, and the André Breton group, Pierre Matisse's gallery, and Peggy Guggenheim's gallery The Art of This Century, as well as other factors. Hans Hofmann in particular as teacher, mentor, and artist was both important and influential to the development and success of abstract expressionism in the United States. Among Hofmann's protégés was Clement Greenberg, who became an enormously influential voice for American painting, and among his students was Lee Krasner, who introduced her teacher, Hofmann, to her husband, Jackson Pollock.

==== Pollock and Abstract influences ====
During the late 1940s, Jackson Pollock's radical approach to painting revolutionized the potential for all Contemporary art that followed him. To some extent, Pollock realized that the journey toward making a work of art was as important as the work of art itself. Like Picasso's innovative reinventions of painting and sculpture near the turn of the century via Cubism and constructed sculpture, with influences as disparate as Navajo sand paintings, surrealism, Jungian analysis, and Mexican mural art, Pollock redefined what it was to produce art. His move away from easel painting and conventionality was a liberating signal to the artists of his era and to all that came after. Artists realized that Jackson Pollock's process—the placing of unstretched raw canvas on the floor where it could be attacked from all four sides using artist materials and industrial materials; linear skeins of paint dripped and thrown; drawing, staining, brushing; imagery and non-imagery—essentially took art-making beyond any prior boundary. Abstract expressionism in general expanded and developed the definitions and possibilities that artists had available for the creation of new works of art.

The other abstract expressionists followed Pollock's breakthrough with new breakthroughs of their own. In a sense the innovations of Pollock, de Kooning, Franz Kline, Rothko, Philip Guston, Hans Hofmann, Clyfford Still, Barnett Newman, Ad Reinhardt, Richard Pousette-Dart, Robert Motherwell, Peter Voulkos, and others opened the floodgates to the diversity and scope of all the art that followed them. The radical Anti-Formalist movements of the 1960s and 1970s including Fluxus, Neo-Dada, Conceptual art, and the feminist art movement can be traced to the innovations of abstract expressionism. Re-readings into abstract art, done by art historians such as Linda Nochlin, Griselda Pollock and Catherine de Zegher critically shows, however, that pioneer women artists who have produced major innovations in modern art had been ignored by the official accounts of its history, but finally began to achieve long overdue recognition in the wake of the abstract expressionist movement of the 1940s and 1950s. Abstract expressionism emerged as a major art movement in New York City during the 1950s and thereafter several leading art galleries began to include the abstract expressionists in exhibitions and as regulars in their rosters. Some of those prominent 'uptown' galleries included: the Charles Egan Gallery, the Sidney Janis Gallery, the Betty Parsons Gallery, the Kootz Gallery, the Tibor de Nagy Gallery, the Stable Gallery, the Leo Castelli Gallery as well as others; and several downtown galleries known at the time as the Tenth Street galleries exhibited many emerging younger artists working in the abstract expressionist vein.

==== Action painting ====
Action painting was a style widespread from the 1940s until the early 1960s, and is closely associated with abstract expressionism (some critics have used the terms action painting and abstract expressionism interchangeably). A comparison is often drawn between the American action painting and the French tachisme.

The term was coined by the American critic Harold Rosenberg in 1952 and signaled a major shift in the aesthetic perspective of New York School painters and critics. According to Rosenberg the canvas was "an arena in which to act". While abstract expressionists such as Jackson Pollock, Franz Kline and Willem de Kooning had long been outspoken in their view of a painting as an arena within which to come to terms with the act of creation, earlier critics sympathetic to their cause, like Clement Greenberg, focused on their works' "objectness". To Greenberg, it was the physicality of the paintings' clotted and oil-caked surfaces that was the key to understanding them as documents of the artists' existential struggle.

Boon by James Brooks, 1957, Tate Gallery

Rosenberg's critique shifted the emphasis from the object to the struggle itself, with the finished painting being only the physical manifestation, a kind of residue, of the actual work of art, which was in the act or process of the painting's creation. This spontaneous activity was the "action" of the painter, through arm and wrist movement, painterly gestures, brushstrokes, thrown paint, splashed, stained, scumbled and dripped. The painter would sometimes let the paint drip onto the canvas, while rhythmically dancing, or even standing in the canvas, sometimes letting the paint fall according to the subconscious mind, thus letting the unconscious part of the psyche assert and express itself. All this, however, is difficult to explain or interpret because it is a supposed unconscious manifestation of the act of pure creation.

In practice, the term abstract expressionism is applied to any number of artists working (mostly) in New York who had quite different styles, and even applied to work which is not especially abstract nor expressionist. Pollock's energetic action paintings, with their "busy" feel, are different both technically and aesthetically, to De Kooning's violent and grotesque Women series. Woman V is one of a series of six paintings made by de Kooning between 1950 and 1953 that depict a three-quarter-length female figure. He began the first of these paintings, Woman I, in June 1950, repeatedly changing and painting out the image until January or February 1952, when the painting was abandoned unfinished. The art historian Meyer Schapiro saw the painting in de Kooning's studio soon afterwards and encouraged the artist to persist. De Kooning's response was to begin three other paintings on the same theme; Woman II, Woman III and Woman IV. During the summer of 1952, spent at East Hampton, de Kooning further explored the theme through drawings and pastels. He may have finished work on Woman I by the end of June, or possibly as late as November 1952, and probably the other three women pictures were concluded at much the same time. The Woman series are decidedly figurative paintings.

Another important artist is Franz Kline. As with Jackson Pollock and other abstract expressionists, Kline was labelled an "action painter" because of his seemingly spontaneous and intense style, focusing less, or not at all, on figures or imagery, but on the actual brushstrokes and use of canvas; as demonstrated by his painting Number 2 (1954).

Automatic writing was an important vehicle for action painters such as Kline (in his black and white paintings), Pollock, Mark Tobey and Cy Twombly, who used gesture, surface, and line to create calligraphic, linear symbols and skeins that resemble language, and resonate as powerful manifestations from the Collective unconscious. Robert Motherwell in his Elegy to the Spanish Republic series painted powerful black and white paintings using gesture, surface and symbol evoking powerful emotional charges.

Gaining greater notoriety posthumously, enamelist Paul Hultberg (1926-2019), an active contributor to the New York School at the time, has more recently been recognized by historian and curator, Glenn Adamson for his use of "chance operations", or what Adamson referred to as "aleatory aesthetics". Hultberg's style of action painting incorporated fire, splashing, and unpredictable chemical reactions that dictated the final look of the abstract expressionist murals he created utilizing the unconventional medium of vitreous enamel on copper.

Meanwhile, other action painters, notably de Kooning, Gorky, Norman Bluhm, Joan Mitchell and James Brooks, used imagery via either abstract landscape or as expressionistic visions of the figure to articulate their highly personal and powerful evocations. James Brooks' paintings were particularly poetic and highly prescient in relationship to Lyrical Abstraction that became prominent in the late 1960s and the 1970s.

==== Color field ====
Clyfford Still, Barnett Newman, Adolph Gottlieb and the serenely shimmering blocks of color in Mark Rothko's work (which is not what would usually be called expressionist and which Rothko denied was abstract), are classified as abstract expressionists, albeit from what Clement Greenberg termed the Color field direction of abstract expressionism. Both Hans Hofmann and Robert Motherwell can be comfortably described as practitioners of Action painting and Color field painting. In the 1940s Richard Pousette-Dart's tightly constructed imagery often depended upon themes of mythology and mysticism; as did the paintings of Gottlieb, and Pollock in that decade as well.

Color Field painting initially referred to a particular type of abstract expressionism, especially the work of Rothko, Still, Newman, Motherwell, Gottlieb, Ad Reinhardt and several series of paintings by Joan Miró. Greenberg perceived Color Field painting as related to but different from Action painting. The Color Field painters sought to rid their art of superfluous rhetoric. Artists like Motherwell, Still, Rothko, Gottlieb, Hans Hofmann, Helen Frankenthaler, Sam Francis, Mark Tobey, and especially Ad Reinhardt and Barnett Newman, whose masterpiece Vir heroicus sublimis is in the collection of MoMA, used greatly reduced references to nature, and they painted with a highly articulated and psychological use of color. In general, these artists eliminated recognizable imagery, in the case of Rothko and Gottlieb sometimes using symbols and signs as a replacement of imagery. Certain artists quoted references to past or present art, but in general color field painting presents abstraction as an end in itself. In pursuing this direction of modern art, artists wanted to present each painting as one unified, cohesive, monolithic image.

In distinction to the emotional energy and gestural surface marks of abstract expressionists such as Pollock and de Kooning, the Color Field painters initially appeared to be cool and austere, effacing the individual mark in favor of large, flat areas of color, which these artists considered to be the essential nature of visual abstraction, along with the actual shape of the canvas, which later in the 1960s Frank Stella in particular achieved in unusual ways with combinations of curved and straight edges. However, Color Field painting has proven to be both sensual and deeply expressive albeit in a different way from gestural abstract expressionism.

Although abstract expressionism spread quickly throughout the United States, the major centers of this style were New York City and California, especially in the New York School, and the San Francisco Bay area. Abstract expressionist paintings share certain characteristics, including the use of large canvases, an "all-over" approach, in which the whole canvas is treated with equal importance (as opposed to the center being of more interest than the edges). The canvas as the arena became a credo of Action painting, while the integrity of the picture plane became a credo of the Color field painters. Younger artists began exhibiting their abstract expressionist related paintings during the 1950s as well including Alfred Leslie, Sam Francis, Joan Mitchell, Helen Frankenthaler, Cy Twombly, Milton Resnick, Michael Goldberg, Norman Bluhm, Grace Hartigan, Friedel Dzubas, and Robert Goodnough among others.

William Baziotes, Cyclops, 1947, oil on canvas, Chicago Art Institute. Baziotes' abstract expressionist works show the influence of Surrealism

Although Pollock is closely associated with Action Painting because of his style, technique, and his painterly touch and his physical application of paint, art critics have likened Pollock to both Action painting and color field painting. Another critical view advanced by Greenberg connects Pollock's allover canvasses to the large-scale Water Lilies of Claude Monet done during the 1920s. Art critics such as Michael Fried, Greenberg and others have observed that the overall feeling in Pollock's most famous works – his drip paintings – read as vast fields of built-up linear elements. They note that these works often read as vast complexes of similarly-valued paint skeins and all-over fields of color and drawing, and are related to the mural-sized Monets which are similarly constructed of close-valued brushed and scumbled marks that also read as fields of color and drawing. Pollock's use of all-over composition lend a philosophical and a physical connection to the way the color field painters like Newman, Rothko and Still construct their unbroken and in Still's case broken surfaces. In several paintings that Pollock painted after his classic drip painting period of 1947–1950, he used the technique of staining fluid oil paint and house paint into raw canvas. During 1951 he produced a series of semi-figurative black stain paintings, and in 1952 he produced stain paintings using color. In his November 1952 exhibition at the Sidney Janis Gallery in New York City Pollock showed Number 12, 1952, a large, masterful stain painting that resembles a brightly colored stained landscape (with an overlay of broadly dripped dark paint); the painting was acquired from the exhibition by Nelson Rockefeller for his personal collection.

While Arshile Gorky is considered to be one of the founding fathers of abstract expressionism and a surrealist, he was also one of the first painters of the New York School who used the technique of staining. Gorky created broad fields of vivid, open, unbroken color that he used in many of his paintings as grounds. In Gorky's most effective and accomplished paintings between the years 1941–1948, he consistently used intense stained fields of color, often letting the paint run and drip, under and around his familiar lexicon of organic and biomorphic shapes and delicate lines. Another abstract expressionist whose works in the 1940s call to mind the stain paintings of the 1960s and the 1970s is James Brooks. Brooks regularly used stain as a technique in his paintings from the late 1940s. Brooks began diluting his oil paint to have fluid colors with which to pour and drip and stain into the mostly raw canvas that he used. These works often combined calligraphy and abstract shapes. During the final three decades of his career, Sam Francis' style of large-scale bright abstract expressionism was closely associated with Color field painting. His paintings straddled both camps within the abstract expressionist rubric, Action painting and Color Field painting.

Having seen Pollock's 1951 paintings of thinned black oil paint stained into raw canvas, Frankenthaler began to produce stain paintings in varied oil colors on raw canvas in 1952. Her most famous painting from that period is Mountains and Sea. She is one of the originators of the Color Field movement that emerged in the late 1950s. Frankenthaler also studied with Hans Hofmann.

Hofmann's paintings are a symphony of color as seen in The Gate, 1959–1960. He was renowned not only as an artist but also as a teacher of art, both in his native Germany and later in the US. Hofmann, who came to the United States from Germany in the early 1930s, brought with him the legacy of Modernism. As a young artist in pre-First World War Paris, Hofmann worked with Robert Delaunay, and he knew firsthand the innovative work of both Picasso and Matisse. Matisse's work had an enormous influence on him, and on his understanding of the expressive language of color and the potentiality of abstraction. Hofmann was one of the first theorists of color field painting, and his theories were influential to artists and to critics, particularly to Clement Greenberg, as well as to others during the 1930s and 1940s. In 1953 Morris Louis and Kenneth Noland were both profoundly influenced by Helen Frankenthaler's stain paintings after visiting her studio in New York City. Returning to Washington, DC., they began to produce the major works that created the color field movement in the late 1950s.

In 1972 then Metropolitan Museum of Art curator Henry Geldzahler said:

Clement Greenberg included the work of both Morris Louis and Kenneth Noland in a show that he did at the Kootz Gallery in the early 1950s. Clem was the first to see their potential. He invited them up to New York in 1953, I think it was, to Helen's studio to see a painting that she had just done called Mountains and Sea, a very, very beautiful painting, which was in a sense, out of Pollock and out of Gorky. It also was one of the first stain pictures, one of the first large field pictures in which the stain technique was used, perhaps the first one. Louis and Noland saw the picture unrolled on the floor of her studio and went back to Washington, DC., and worked together for a while, working at the implications of this kind of painting.

==== In the 1960s after abstract expressionism ====
In abstract painting during the 1950s and 1960s, several new directions, like the Hard-edge painting exemplified by John McLaughlin, emerged. Meanwhile, as a reaction against the subjectivism of abstract expressionism, other forms of Geometric abstraction began to appear in artist studios and in radical avant-garde circles. Greenberg became the voice of Post-painterly abstraction; by curating an influential exhibition of new painting that toured important art museums throughout the United States in 1964. Color field painting, Hard-edge painting and Lyrical Abstraction emerged as radical new directions.

== Abstract expressionism and the Cold War ==
Since the mid-1970s it has been argued that the style attracted the attention, in the early 1950s, of the CIA, who saw it as representative of the US as a haven of free thought and free markets, as well as a challenge to both the socialist realist styles prevalent in communist nations and the dominance of the European art markets. The book by Frances Stonor Saunders, The Cultural Cold War—The CIA and the World of Arts and Letters, (published in the UK as Who Paid the Piper?: CIA and the Cultural Cold War) details how the CIA financed and organized the promotion of American abstract expressionists as part of cultural imperialism via the Congress for Cultural Freedom from 1950 to 1967. Notably Robert Motherwell's series Elegy to the Spanish Republic addressed some of those political issues. Tom Braden, founding chief of the CIA's International Organizations Division (IOD) and ex-executive secretary of the Museum of Modern Art said in an interview, "I think it was the most important division that the agency had, and I think that it played an enormous role in the Cold War."

Against this revisionist tradition, an essay by Michael Kimmelman, chief art critic of The New York Times, called Revisiting the Revisionists: The Modern, Its Critics and the Cold War, asserts that much of that information concerning what was happening on the American art scene during the 1940s and 50s, as well as the revisionists' interpretation of it, is false or decontextualized. Other books on the subject include Art in the Cold War, by Christine Lindey, which also describes the art of the Soviet Union at the same time, and Pollock and After, edited by Francis Frascina, which reprinted the Kimmelman article.

== Consequences ==
Mark di Suvero, Aurora, 1992–1993

Jean-Paul Riopelle, 1951, Untitled, oil on canvas, 54 x 64.7 cm (21 1/4 x 25 1/2 in.), private collection

Canadian painter Jean-Paul Riopelle (1923–2002), a member of the Montreal-based surrealist-inspired group Les Automatistes, helped introduce a related style of abstract impressionism to the Parisian art world from 1949. Michel Tapié's groundbreaking book, Un Art Autre (1952), was also enormously influential in this regard. Tapié was also a curator and exhibition organizer who promoted the works of Pollock and Hans Hofmann in Europe. By the 1960s, the movement's initial effect had been assimilated, yet its methods and proponents remained highly influential in art, affecting profoundly the work of many artists who followed. Abstract expressionism preceded Tachisme, color field painting, lyrical abstraction, Fluxus, pop art, minimalism, postminimalism, neo-expressionism, and the other movements of the sixties and seventies and it influenced all those later movements that evolved. Movements which were direct responses to, and rebellions against abstract expressionism began with Hard-edge painting (Frank Stella, Robert Indiana and others) and Pop Artists, notably Andy Warhol, Claes Oldenburg and Roy Lichtenstein who achieved prominence in the US, accompanied by Richard Hamilton in Britain. Robert Rauschenberg and Jasper Johns in the US formed a bridge between abstract expressionism and Pop art. Minimalism was exemplified by artists such as Donald Judd, Robert Mangold and Agnes Martin.

However, many painters, such as Jules Olitski, Joan Mitchell and Antoni Tàpies continued to work in the abstract expressionist style for many years, extending and expanding its visual and philosophical implications, as many abstract artists continue to do today, in styles described as lyrical abstraction, neo-expressionist and others.

In the years after World War II, a group of New York artists started one of the first true schools of artists in America, bringing about a new era in American artwork: abstract expressionism. This led to the American art boom that brought about styles such as Pop Art. This also helped to make New York City into a cultural and artistic hub.

Abstract Expressionists value the organism over the static whole, becoming over being, expression over perfection, vitality over finish, fluctuation over repose, feeling over formulation, the unknown over the known, the veiled over the clear, the individual over society and the inner over the outer.

— William C. Seitz, American artist and Art historian

== Major sculpture ==
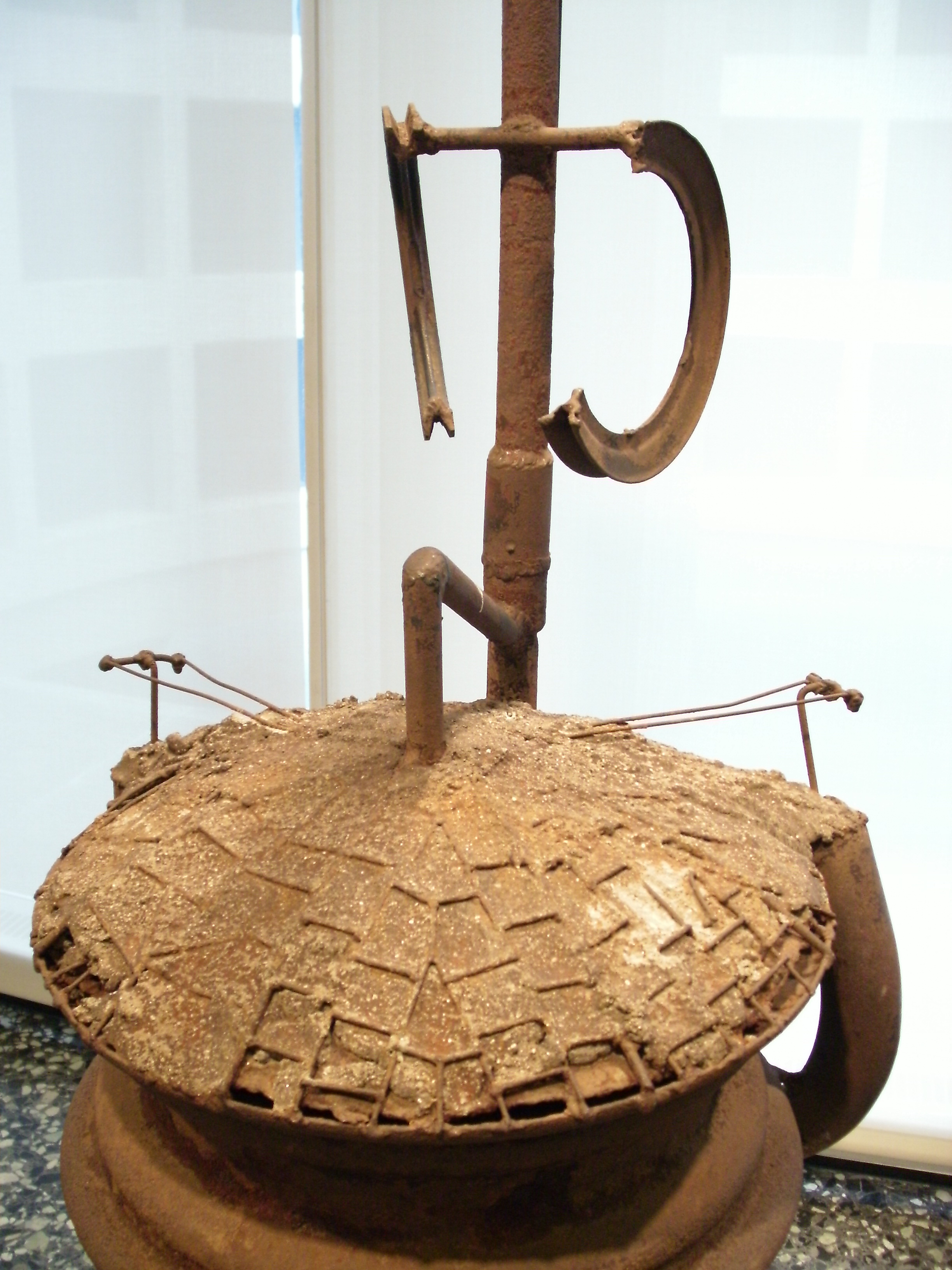
Richard Stankiewicz, Detail of Figure; 1956; steel, iron, and concrete; in the collection of the Hirshhorn Museum and Sculpture Garden

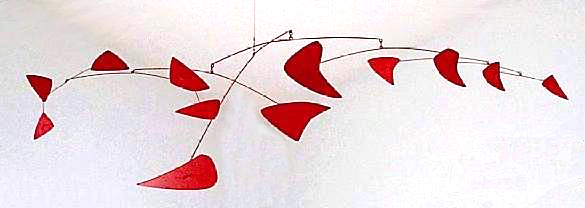
Alexander Calder, Red Mobile, 1956, Painted sheet metal and metal rods, Montreal Museum of Fine Arts

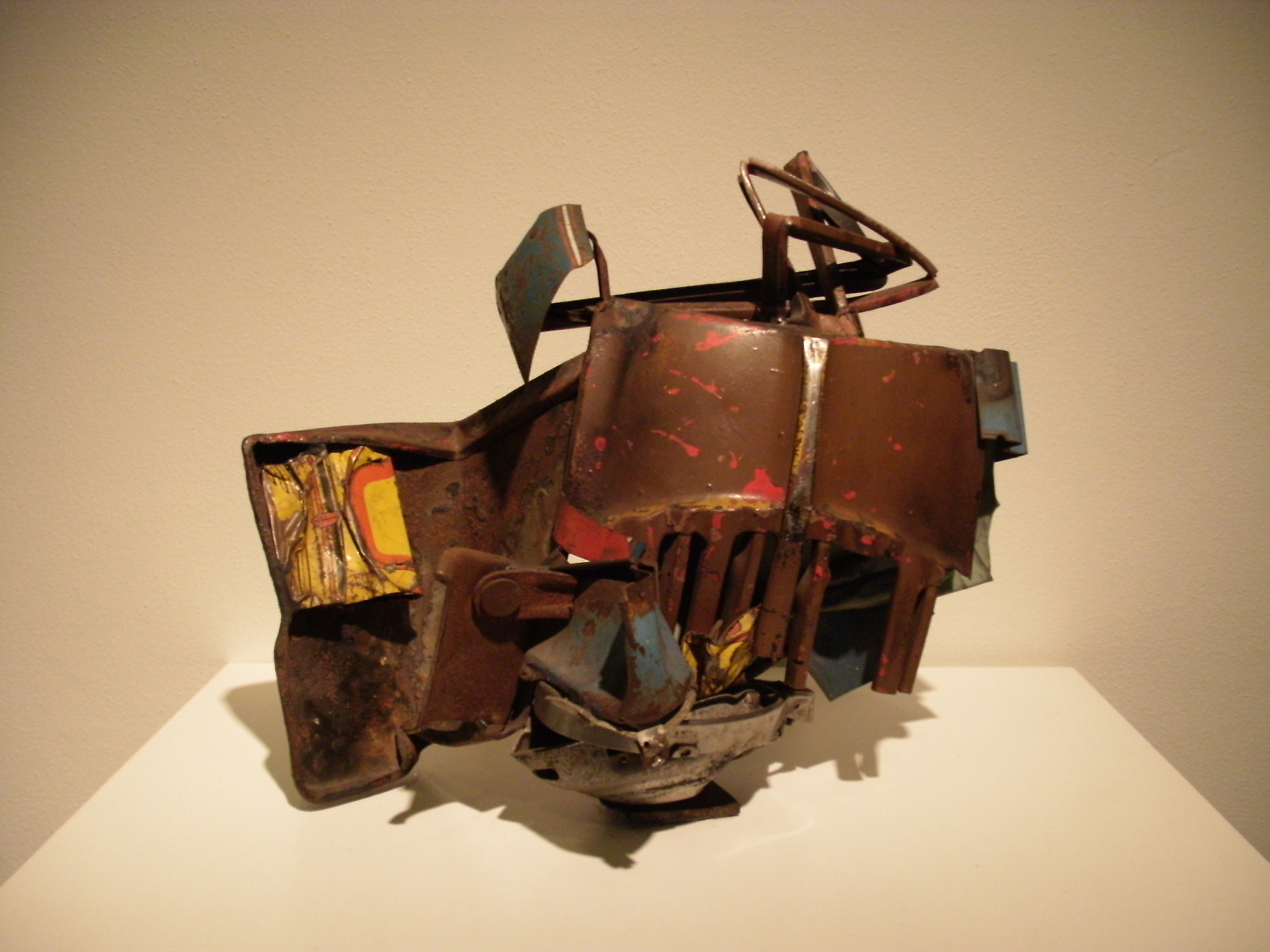
John Chamberlain, S, 1959, Hirshhorn Museum and Sculpture Garden, Washington, D.C.

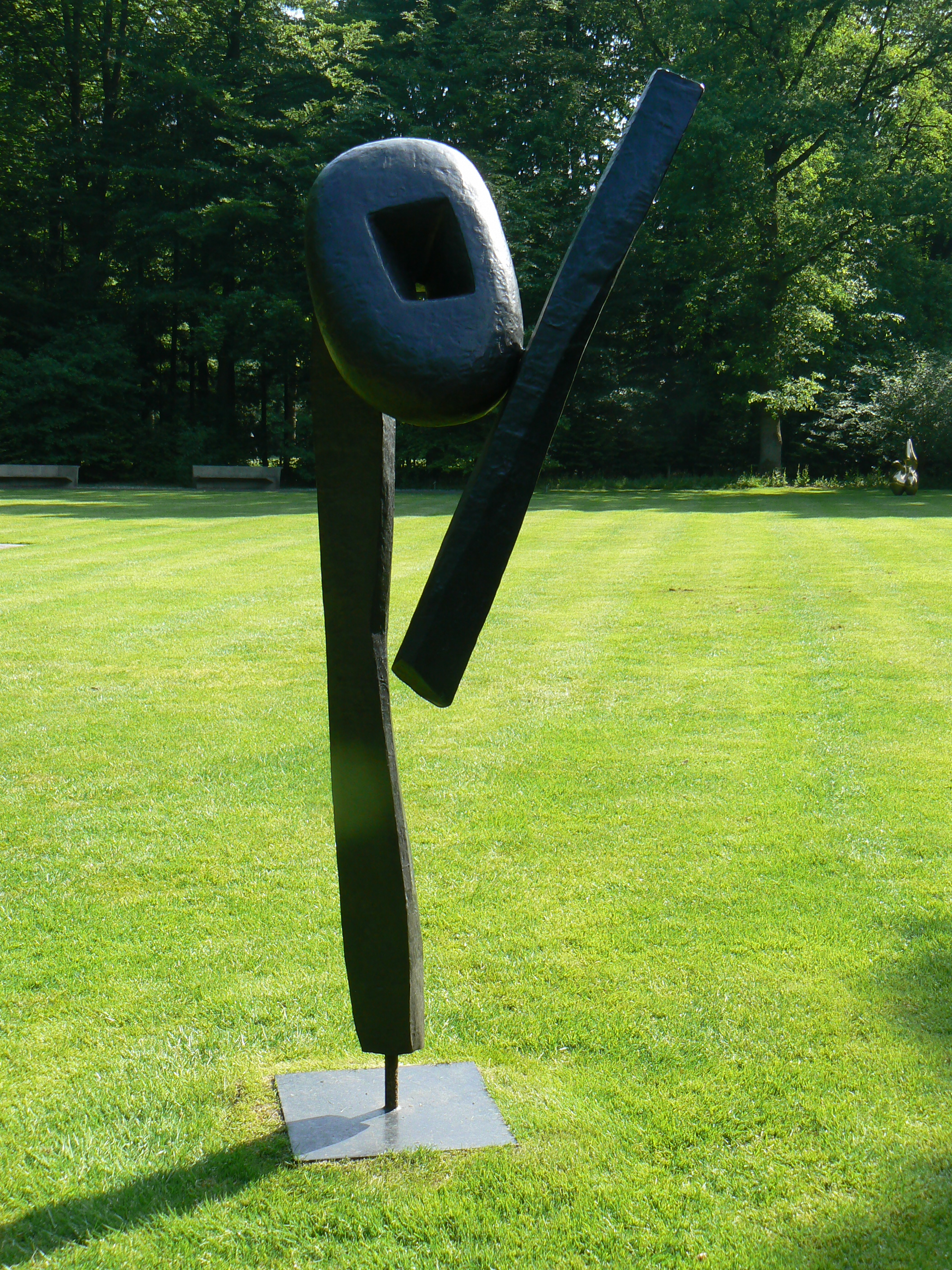
Isamu Noguchi, The Cry, 1959, Kröller-Müller Museum Sculpture Park, Otterlo, Netherlands

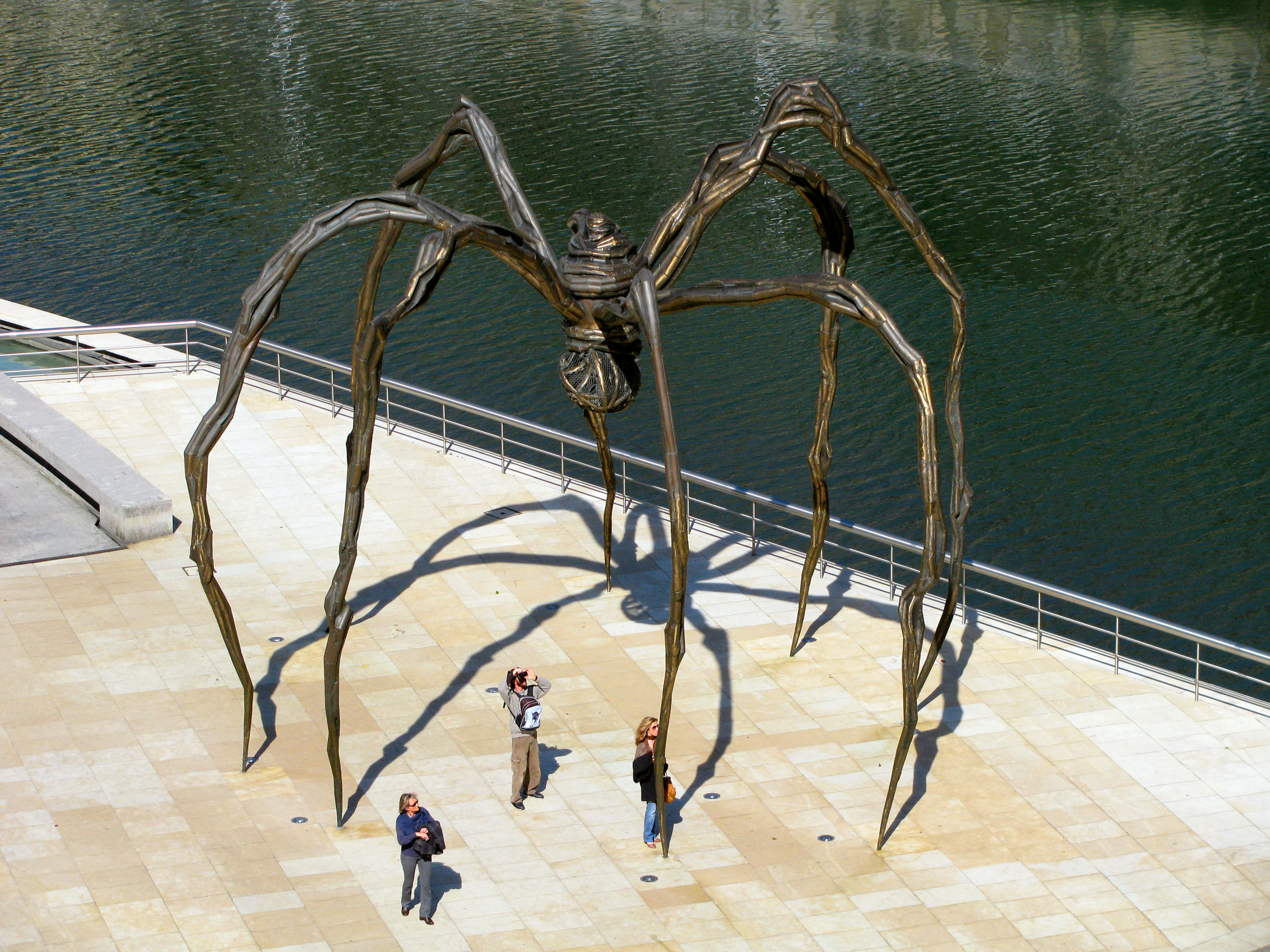
Louise Bourgeois, Maman, 1999, outside Museo Guggenheim

== List of abstract expressionists ==
=== Abstract expressionist artists ===
Significant artists whose mature work defined American abstract expressionism:

- Albert Alcalay (1917–2008)
- Charles Alston (1907–1977)
- Ruth Asawa (1926–2013)
- Alice Baber (1928–1982)
- William Baziotes (1912–1963)
- James Bishop (1927–2021)
- Norman Bluhm (1921–1999)
- Louise Bourgeois (1911–2010)
- Ernest Briggs (1923–1984)
- James Brooks (1906–1992)
- David Budd (1927–1991)
- Fritz Bultman (1919–1985)
- Hans Burkhardt (1904–1994)
- Jack Bush (1909–1977)
- Charles Cajori (1921–2013)
- Lawrence Calcagno (1913–1993)
- Alexander Calder (1898–1976)
- Nicolas Carone (1917–2010)
- Norman Carton (1908–1980)
- Giorgio Cavallon (1904–1989)
- John Chamberlain (1927–2011)
- Ed Clark (1926–2019)
- Joseph Cornell (1903–1972)
- Dorothy Dehner (1901–1994)
- Jean Dubuffet (1901–1985)
- Elaine de Kooning (1918–1989)
- Willem de Kooning (1904–1997)
- Beauford Delaney (1901–1979)
- Robert De Niro, Sr. (1922–1993)
- Richard Diebenkorn (1922–1993)
- Mark di Suvero (born 1933)
- James Budd Dixon (1900–1967)
- Enrico Donati (1909–2008)
- Edward Dugmore (1915–1996)
- Friedel Dzubas (1915–1994)
- Jimmy Ernst (1920–1984)
- Herbert Ferber (1906–1991)
- John Ferren (1905–1970)
- Perle Fine (1905–1988)
- Sam Francis (1923–1994)
- Jane Frank (1918–1986)
- Helen Frankenthaler (1928–2011)
- Sonia Gechtoff (1926–2018)
- Michael Goldberg (1924–2007)
- Robert Goodnough (1917–2010)
- Arshile Gorky (1904–1948)
- Joseph Goto (1916–1994)
- Adolph Gottlieb (1903–1974)
- Morris Graves (1910–2001)
- Cleve Gray (1918–2004)
- Philip Guston (1913–1980)
- Raoul Hague (1904–1993)
- David Hare (1917–1992)
- Grace Hartigan (1922–2008)
- Hans Hofmann (1880–1966)
- Paul Horiuchi (1906–1999)
- John Hultberg (1922–2005)
- Paul Jenkins (1923–2012)
- Gerome Kamrowski (1914–2004)
- Matsumi Kanemitsu (1922–1992)
- Minoru Kawabata (1911–2001)
- James Kelly (1913–2003)
- Earl Kerkam (1891–1965)
- Franz Kline (1910–1962)
- Albert Kotin (1907–1980)
- Lee Krasner (1908–1984)
- Walter Kuhlman (1918–2009)
- Blaine Gledhill Larson (1937–2022)
- Ibram Lassaw (1913–2003)
- Alfred Leslie (1927–2023)
- John Harrison Levee (1924–2017)
- Norman Lewis (1901–1979)
- Richard Lippold (1915–2002)
- Seymour Lipton (1903–1986)
- Frank Lobdell (1921–2013)
- Morris Louis (1912–1962)
- Conrad Marca-Relli (1913–2000)
- Nicholas Marsicano (1908–1991)
- Mercedes Matter (1913–2001)
- Hugh Mesibov (1916–2016)
- Fred Mitchell (1923–2013)
- Joan Mitchell (1925–1992)
- Robert Motherwell (1915–1991)
- Louise Nevelson (1899–1988)
- Barnett Newman (1905–1970)
- Isamu Noguchi (1904–1988)
- Kenzo Okada (1902–1982)
- John Opper (1908–1994)
- Charlotte Park (1910–2010)
- Ray Parker (1922–1990)
- Phillip Pavia (1912–2005)
- Jackson Pollock (1912–1956)
- Fuller Potter (1910–1990)
- Richard Pousette-Dart (1916–1992)
- Ad Reinhardt (1913–1967)
- Milton Resnick (1917–2004)
- Robert Richenburg (1917–2006)
- George Rickey (1904–2002)
- Jean-Paul Riopelle (1923–2002)
- William Ronald (1926–1998)
- James Rosati (1911–1988)
- Ralph Rosenborg (1913–1992)
- Theodore Roszak (1907–1981)
- Mark Rothko (1903–1970)
- Anne Ryan (1889–1954)
- Ludwig Sander (1906–1975)
- Joop Sanders (1921–2023)
- Louis Schanker (1903–1981)
- Jon Schueler (1916–1992)
- Charles Seliger (1926–2009)
- Harold Shapinsky (1925–2004)
- Thomas Sills (1914–2000)
- Janet Sobel (1893–1968)
- David Smith (1906–1965)
- Theodoros Stamos (1922–1997)
- Richard Stankiewicz (1922–1983)
- Joe Stefanelli (1921–2017)
- Hedda Sterne (1910–2011)
- Clyfford Still (1904–1980)
- George Stillman (1921–1997)
- Reuben Tam (1916–1991)
- Alma Thomas (1891–1978)
- Mark Tobey (1890–1976)
- Bradley Walker Tomlin (1899–1953)
- Cy Twombly (1928–2011)
- Jack Tworkov (1900–1982)
- Esteban Vicente (1903–2001)
- Peter Voulkos (1924–2002)
- Corinne Michelle West (1908–1991)
- John von Wicht (1888–1970)
- Hale Woodruff (1900–1980)
- Emerson Woelffer (1914–2003)
- Taro Yamamoto (1919–1994)
- Manouchehr Yektai (1922–2019)

=== Other artists ===
Significant artists whose mature work relates to the American abstract expressionist movement:

- Satoru Abe (1926–2025)
- Bumpei Akaji (1921–2002)
- Olga Albizu (1924–2005)
- Karel Appel (1921–2006)
- Mino Argento (born 1927)
- Rosemarie Beck (1923–2003)
- William Brice (1921–2008)
- Alexander Bogen (1916–2010)
- Charles Ragland Bunnell (1897–1968)
- Gretna Campbell (1922–1987)
- Mary Callery (1903–1977)
- Chu Teh-Chun (1920–2014)
- Edward Clark (1926–2019)
- Alfred L. Copley (1910–1992) (aka L. Alcopley)
- Edward Corbett (1919–1971)
- Jean-Michel Coulon (1920–2014)
- Sari Dienes (1898–1992)
- Jacques Démoulin (1905–1991)
- Isami Doi (1903–1965)
- Lynne Mapp Drexler (1928–1999)
- Jean Dubuffet (1901–1985)
- Lucio Fontana (1899–1968)
- Alice Garver (1924–1966)
- Herbert Gentry (1919–2003)
- Sam Gilliam (1933–2022)
- Joseph Glasco (1925–1996)
- John D. Graham (1886–1961)
- Stephen Greene (1918–1999)
- Elaine Hamilton (1920–2010)
- Hans Hartung (1904–1989)
- Saburo Hasegawa (1906–1957)
- Al Held (1928–2005)
- Raymond Hendler (1923–1998)
- Gino Hollander (1924–2015)
- John Hoyland (1934–2011)
- Ralph Iwamoto (1927–2013)
- William Ivey (1919–1992)
- Jasper Johns (born 1930)
- Karl Kasten (1916–2010)
- Keichi Kimura (1914–1988)
- Sueko Kimura (1912–2001)
- Hilma af Klint (1862–1944)
- Frances Kornbluth (1920–2014)
- André Lanskoy (1902–1976)
- John Levee (1924–2017)
- Michael Loew (1907–1985)
- Agnes Martin (1912–2004)
- Knox Martin (1923–2022)
- Georges Mathieu (1921–2012)
- Herbert Matter (1907–1984)
- Emiko Nakano (1925–1990)
- George McNeil (1908–1995)
- Jean Messagier (1920–1999)
- Jay Meuser (1911–1963)
- George Miyasaki (1935–2013)
- Seong Moy (1921–2013)
- Jan Müller (1922–1958)
- Robert Natkin (1930–2010)
- Kenneth Noland (1924–2010)
- Tetsuo Ochikubo (1923–1975)
- Frank Okada (1931–2000)
- Jerry Okimoto (1924–1998)
- Jules Olitski (1922–2007)
- Pat Passlof (1928–2011)
- Irene Rice-Pereira (1902–1971)
- Earle M. Pilgrim (1923–1976)
- Robert Rauschenberg (1925–2008)
- Larry Rivers (1923–2002)
- Julio Rosado del Valle (1922–2008)
- Jack Roth (1927–2004)
- Tadashi Sato (1923–2005)
- Jon Schueler (1916–1992)
- Pablo Serrano (1908–1985)
- Sarai Sherman (1922–2013)
- Morita Shiryū (1912–1999)
- Vieira da Silva (1907–1992)
- Aaron Siskind (1903–1991)
- Tony Smith (1912–1980)
- Syd Solomon (1917–2004)
- Pierre Soulages (1919–2022)
- Nicolas de Staël (1914–1955)
- Frank Stella (1936–2024)
- Ary Stillman (1891–1967)
- Kumi Sugai (1919–1996)
- Stuart Sutcliffe (1940–1962)
- Augustus Vincent Tack (1870–1949)
- Toshiko Takaezu (1922–2011)
- Antoni Tàpies (1923–2012)
- Harry Tsuchidana (born 1932)
- Tony Tuckson (1921–1973)
- Nína Tryggvadóttir (1913–1968)
- Bram van Velde (1895–1981)
- Don Van Vliet (1941–2010)
- Cora Kelley Ward (1920–1989)
- Ulfert Wilke (1907–1987)
- Wols (1913–1951)
- Tseng Yu-ho (1924–2017)
- Zao Wou Ki (1920–2013)

== See also ==
=== Related styles, trends, schools, and movements ===
- Abstract art
- Abstract Imagists
- Action painting
- American Abstract Artists
- Arte Povera
- Asemic writing
- Avant-garde
- CoBrA
- Color field painting
- History of painting
- Informalism
- Les Automatistes
- Les Plasticiens
- Lyrical Abstraction
- Lyricism
- Minimalism
- New European Painting
- New York School
- Organic Surrealism
- 9th Street Art Exhibition
- Painters Eleven
- Pop art
- Post-painterly abstraction
- Tachisme
- Tenth Street galleries
- The Irascibles
- Western Painting

=== Other related topics ===
- Bluebeard, by Kurt Vonnegut, is a fictional autobiography written by fictional abstract expressionist Rabo Karabekian.
- Michel Tapié (critic and exhibition organizer important to the dissemination of abstract expressionism in Europe, Japan, and Latin America)

== Books ==
- Belgrad, Daniel. The Culture of Spontaneity. Improvisation and the Arts in Postwar America University of Chicago Press, Chicago & London, 1998. ISBN 978-966-359-305-0
- Anfam, David. Abstract Expressionism (New York & London: Thames & Hudson, 1990). ISBN 0-500-20243-5
- Craven, David, Abstract expressionism as cultural critique: dissent during the McCarthy period (Cambridge; New York: Cambridge University Press, 1999.) ISBN 0-521-43415-7
- Marika Herskovic, American Abstract and Figurative Expressionism: Style Is Timely Art Is Timeless (New York School Press, 2009.) ISBN 978-0-9677994-2-1
- Marika Herskovic, American Abstract Expressionism of the 1950s An Illustrated Survey, (New York School Press, 2003.) ISBN 0-9677994-1-4
- Marika Herskovic, New York School Abstract Expressionists Artists Choice by Artists, (New York School Press, 2000.) ISBN 0-9677994-0-6
- Papanikolas, Theresa and Stephen Salel, Stephen, Abstract Expressionism, Looking East from the Far West, Honolulu Museum of Art, 2017, ISBN 9780937426920
- Serge Guilbaut. How New York Stole the Idea of Modern Art, University of Chicago Press, 1983.

== Bibliography ==
- Anfam, David. Abstract Expressionism—A World Elsewhere. New York: Haunch of Venison, 2008, Haunchofvenison.com
- Greenberg, Clement. "'American-Type' Painting". In Art and Culture: Critical Essays. Boston: Beacon Press, 1961. 208–29.
- Jachec, Nancy. The Philosophy and Politics of Abstract Expressionism 1940–1960. Cambridge University Press: Cambridge, 2000 ISBN 0-521-65154-9
- O'Connor, Francis V. Jackson Pollock [exhibition catalogue] (New York, Museum of Modern Art, [1967]) OCLC 165852
- Saunders, Frances Stonor, The cultural cold war: the CIA and the world of arts and letters (New York: New Press: Distributed by W.W. Norton & Co., 2000) ISBN 1-56584-596-X
- Tapié, Michel. Hans Hofmann: peintures 1962 : 23 avril-18 mai 1963. (Paris: Galerie Anderson-Mayer, 1963.) [exhibition catalogue and commentary] OCLC 62515192
- Tapié, Michel. Pollock (Paris, P. Facchetti, 1952) OCLC 30601793
- Wechsler, Jeffrey (2007). Pathways and Parallels: Roads to Abstract Expressionism. New York: Hollis Taggart Galleries. ISBN 978-0-9759954-9-5.
