= Metcalf Chateau =

Asian-American artists

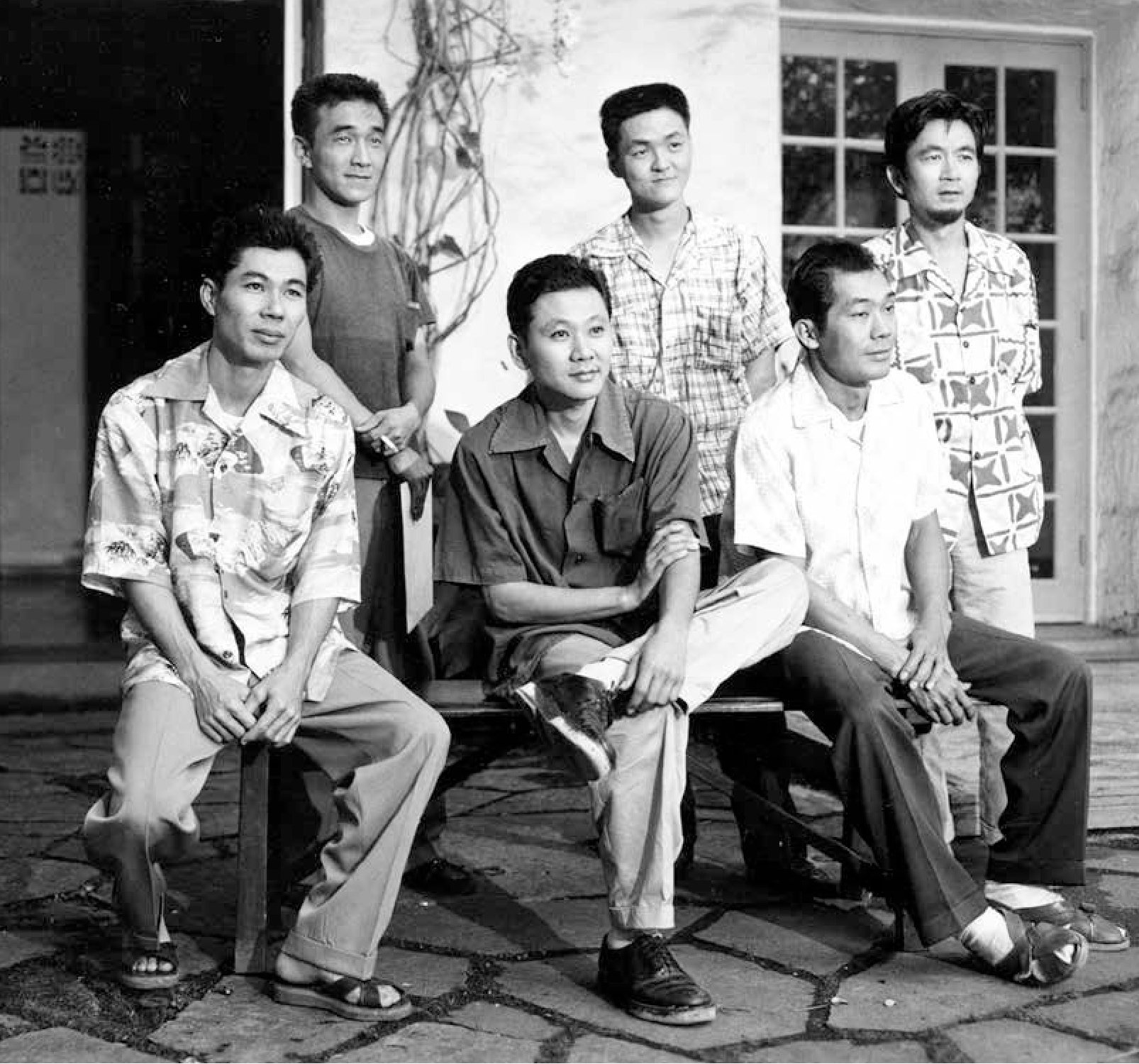
The Metcalf Chateau group at the Honolulu Museum of Art in 1954

The Metcalf Chateau, also known as The Group of Seven, was a group of Asian-American artists with ties to Honolulu. The name is derived from a house slated for demolition on Metcalf Street in Honolulu, in which they exhibited in 1954. The exhibition was seen by Robert Griffin, director of the Honolulu Academy of Arts, who arranged for the artists to have a group show at the museum. The group's members were Satoru Abe (1926-2025), Bumpei Akaji (1921–2002), Edmund Chung, Tetsuo Ochikubo (1923–1975), Jerry T. Okimoto (1924–1998), James Park, and Tadashi Sato (1923–2005).

The Metcalf Chateau overlaps with a loosely associated group of eleven modernist artists of Japanese descent, all nisei (second generation) born in Hawaii. These artists are Satoru Abe, Bumpei Akaji, Isami Doi, Keichi Kimura, Sueko Matsueda Kimura, Harue Oyama McVay, Tetsuo Ochikubo, Jerry T. Okimoto, Tadashi Sato, Toshiko Takaezu, and Harry Tsuchidana. Isami Doi (1903–1965) was the oldest of these eleven artists and mentored many of them.
