= Tadashi Sato =

American painter (1923–2005)

Aquarius, glass mosaic by Tadashi Sato, 1969, Hawaii State Capitol

Untitled 1958 ink and watercolor on paper by Tadashi Sato

Submerged Rocks, oil on canvas painting by Tadashi Sato, 1962, ʻĀina Haina Public Library, Honolulu, Hawaii

Tadashi Sato (February 6, 1923 – June 4, 2005) was an American artist. He was born in Kaupakalua on the Hawaiian island of Maui. His father had been a pineapple laborer, merchant, and calligrapher, and Tadashi's grandfather was a sumi-e artist.

== Biography ==
In childhood, Tadashi studied Japanese sumi ink painting and calligraphy. He served in the 442nd Infantry Regiment as a language specialist during World War II and went on to attend Cannon School of Business in Honolulu. He then pursued his interest in art at the Honolulu Museum of Art under the G.I. Bill with the precisionist painter Ralston Crawford, who was a visiting artist in residence. In 1948 he went to New York to study at the Brooklyn Museum Art School, Pratt Institute and the New York School for Social Research.

Sato's break came while he was working as a security guard at the Museum of Modern Art in New York. A friend, who had been working as a movie extra, introduced him to actors Charles Laughton and Burgess Meredith, who were both art collectors. They visited Sato's apartment and bought several paintings. Sato promptly called his boss at the museum to resign.

Between 1950 and 1960, he traveled back and forth between New York and Hawaii, exhibiting both in Hawaii and on the mainland. In 1960, Tadashi, his wife Kiyoko and two children returned to the islands. In 1965 Sato was honored by President Lyndon Johnson at the White House Festival of Arts, alongside Georgia O'Keeffe, Jackson Pollock and other American artists. From 1960 until his death in 2005, he lived in Maui. Along with Satoru Abe, Bumpei Akaji, Edmund Chung, Tetsuo Ochikubo, Jerry T. Okimoto, and James Park, Tadashi Sato was a member of the Metcalf Chateau, a group of seven Asian-American artists with ties to Honolulu.

Tadashi Sato is considered a member of the abstract expressionist movement. He is known for his abstract and semi-abstract paintings, mosaics, and murals, some, such as Submerged Rocks, inspired by the clear water of his native Hawaii. His goal was to convey a sense of serenity, balance, light and space. Tadashi's most famous work is Aquarius, a 36-foot circular mosaic on the floor of the atrium of the Hawaii State Capitol. The piece depicts submerged rocks and water reflections. The University of Iowa Stanley Museum of Art (Iowa City, IA), the Solomon R. Guggenheim Museum (New York City), the Hawaii State Art Museum, the Honolulu Museum of Art, the University of Arizona Museum of Art (Tucson, Arizona), the Whitney Museum of American Art (New York City) and Yale University Art Gallery are among the public collections holding works of Tadashi Sato.
