= Akumal Ramachander =

Indian art promoter (1949–2024)

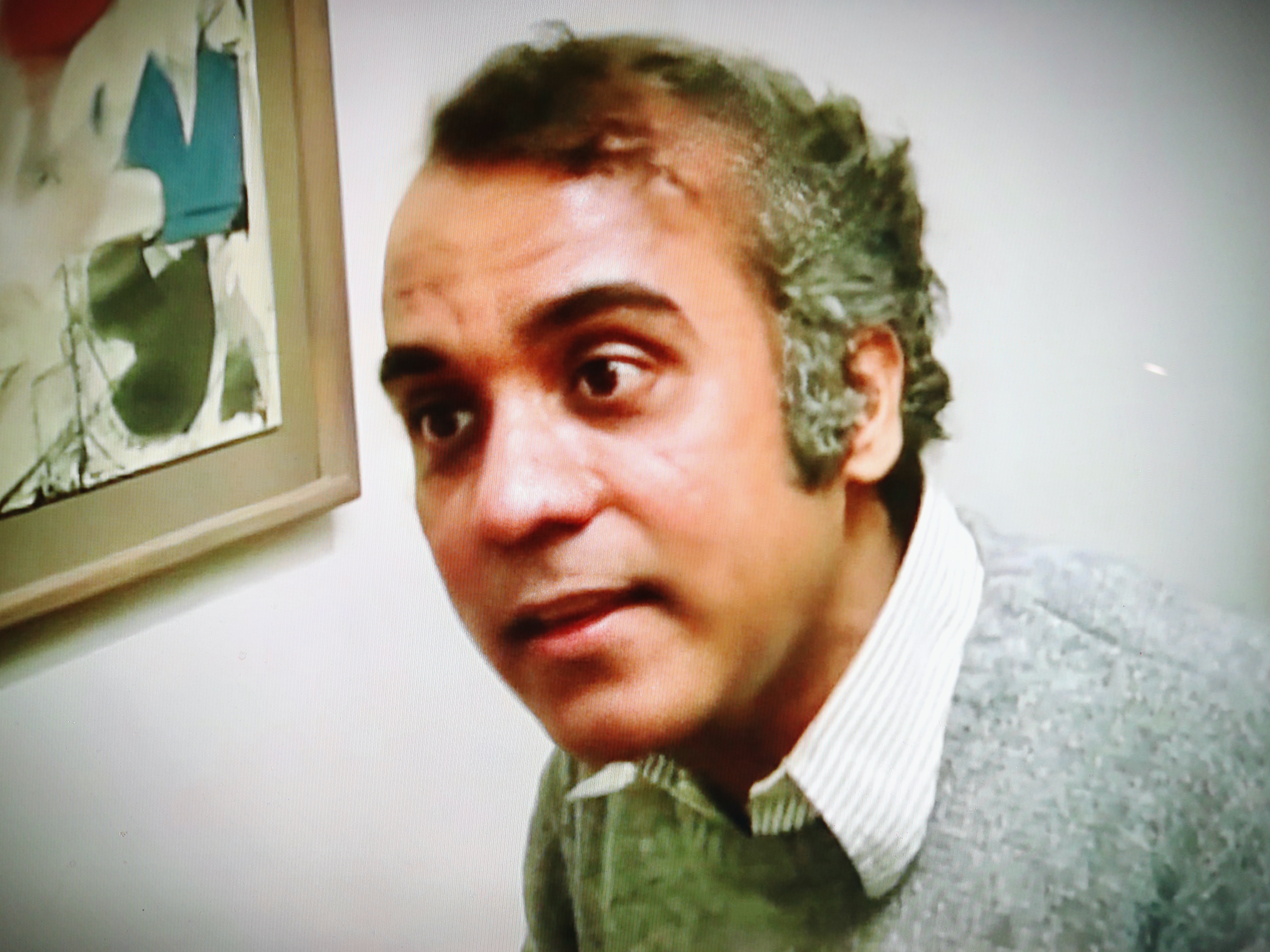
Akumal Ramachander at the Mayor Gallery in London, 1985

Akumal Ramachander (10 July 1949 – 26 December 2024) was an Indian teacher, art advocate and author who gained international recognition after discovering and promoting American abstract expressionist painter Harold Shapinsky. He was the subject of the British Channel 4 Television documentary The Painter and the Pest (1985) with commentary by Salman Rushdie, who opined that this was one of those happy instances in which the East has repaid the West by discovering something the West had forgotten. Ramachander was also recognized by the Polish government for his services in promoting Polish culture in India.

== Early life and education ==
Ramachander was born on 10 July 1949 to a Telugu-speaking family in Bombay, India. The family moved to Calcutta, where he spent some of his early childhood. His father was in the Indian Army and the family had been stationed in various places around India, enabling him to gain proficiency in several Indian languages. The family eventually settled in Bangalore when Ramachander was 16. He attended National College in Bangalore, where he received his Bachelor of Science degree in physics, chemistry and mathematics in 1968. Changing disciplines, he received his master's degree in 1971 from Central College in Bangalore.

== Career ==
Ramachander taught English at the University of Agricultural Sciences, Bangalore, where he attained the position of assistant professor. Devoting much of his spare time to promoting art, he also developed a keen interest in arthouse cinema. He was exposed to Polish cinema during a film festival in Bangalore in 1979. He was particularly fascinated with the films of Polish director Krzysztof Zanussi.

It all started here in 1979… I even brought out a four-page supplement on films of Polish director K Zanussi.

— Akumal Ramachander, on receiving his award from the Polish government, 2009

Zanussi noticed the supplement and invited Ramachander to the 1980 Gdansk film festival. He was captivated by Polish culture, which he felt was vibrant and resembled Indian traditions in that respect.

=== Harold Shapinsky Discovery and International Recognition ===
As chronicled by Lawrence Weschler in The Wanderer in the Perfect City, Ramachander visited the United States in the fall of 1984 on an invitation from a professor at Kansas State University, to lecture on Indian politics and cinema. Stopping in Chicago to visit a friend, the poet and linguist A K Ramanujan, he attended a faculty party of the department of South Asia studies at the University of Chicago where he met an American graduate student, David Shapinsky. Although their conversation initially revolved around international relations, David also learned that Ramachander was promoting artists. They met again by chance at the University of Chicago library, where David mentioned his father to Ramachander for the first time. David's father, Harold Shapinsky, was a hitherto unknown and impoverished abstract expressionist painter from New York. David later showed Ramachander some slides of his father's paintings. Looking at the slides for the first time, Ramachander felt he was in the presence of profound art since it inspired associations with the flowing movements and intense colours of butterflies he had encountered during his youth. He resolved to promote Shapinsky's work.

At his expense Ramachander had a collection of Shapinsky's paintings professionally photographed. He contacted 32 galleries in New York, but no one there was willing to look at the slides. Taking his chances in London, he arrived unannounced at the lobby of the Tate Gallery, and managed to persuade Ronald Alley of the Tate to review the slides. Alley was impressed with Shapinsky's work and provided Ramachander with the crucial referral he needed, a formal introduction to the director of the Mayor Gallery, James Mayor.

Now, for the first time, Akumal had become that most pukka of persons, a man who has been properly introduced.

— Salman Rushdie, in The Painter and the Pest, 1985

Mayor was also suitably impressed with the slides and agreed to give Shapinsky his first solo exhibition in his 40 year career. The exhibition was held at the Mayor Gallery between 21 May and 22 June 1985 and turned out to be very successful. According to the Washington Post, the Mayor Gallery normally attracted 20 to 30 visitors a day, but the Shapinsky exhibition drew in 50 an hour, with paintings selling for $25,000 on average.

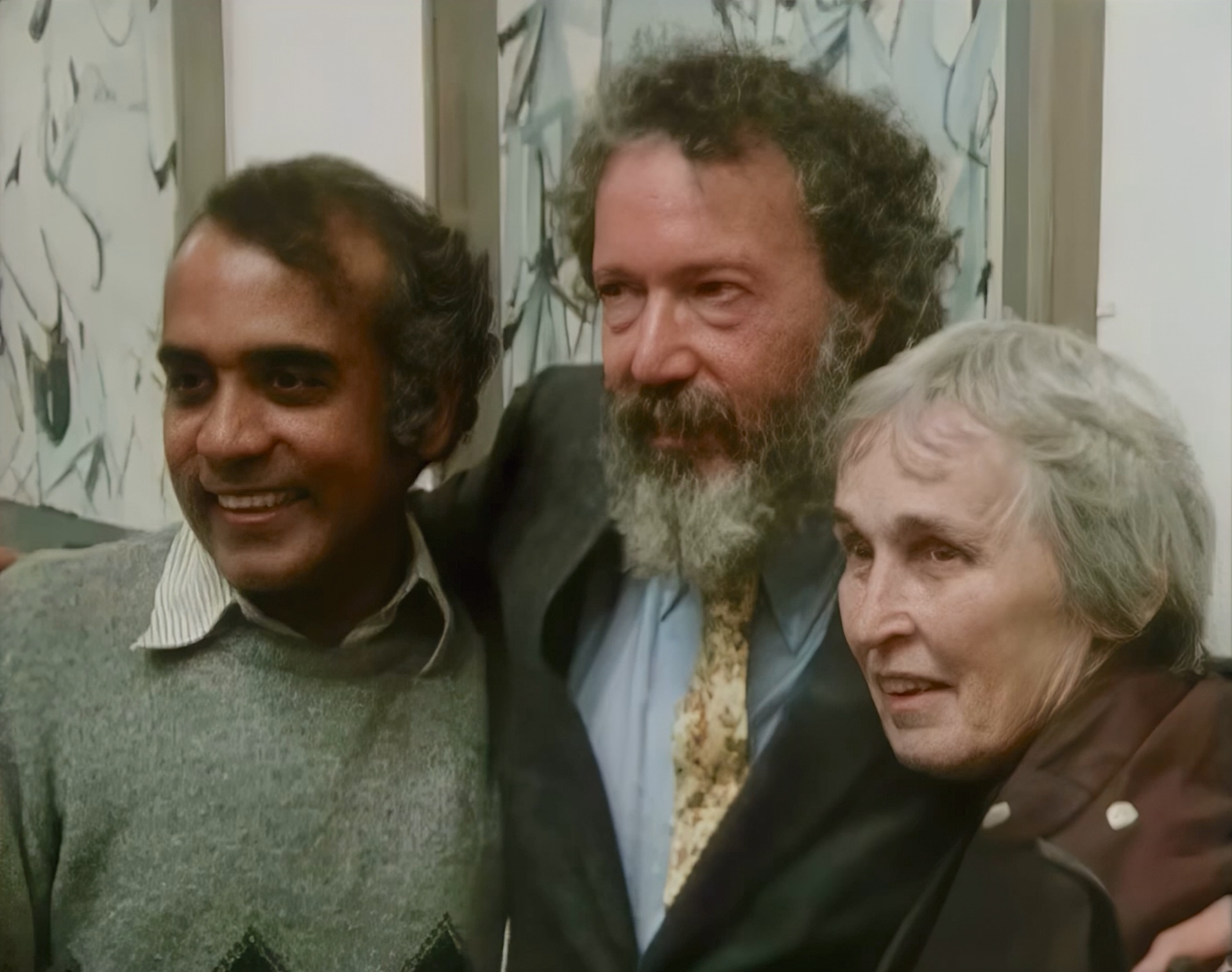
Akumal Ramachander with Harold and Kate Shapinsky on opening night at the Mayor Gallery, in a still from The Painter and the Pest, 1985

The British Channel 4 Television produced the documentary The Painter and the Pest, narrated by Salman Rushdie, about the serendipitous Shapinsky-Ramachander story. It was released in the UK by Channel 4 on 2 June 1985.

=== Little Pig ===
In 1992 Ramachander published a children's book, Little Pig, which was illustrated by Lithuanian artist Stasys Eidrigevicius. It dealt with the moral and ethical issues of animal farming which, in the opinion of some reviewers, might have been unsettling and too Orwellian a story for children.

== Later life and death ==
After quitting his teaching job, he remained active in art circles in Bangalore (now Bengaluru), and continued to promote artists and authors on a full-time basis. He was also active in promoting Polish culture in India and was decorated by the Polish government in 2009 for his efforts.

Akumal is the real cultural ambassador of Poland to India. Single handily (sic) with his dedication and hard work he has put up Polish cultural presence on Indian map.

— Krzysztof Zanussi, on Ramachander being decorated by the Polish government, 2009

Suffering from age-related ailments, Ramachander died in Bengaluru, on 26 December 2024, at the age of 75. His body was donated to a hospital according to the wishes of his family and friends.
