= Gino Hollander =

American painter

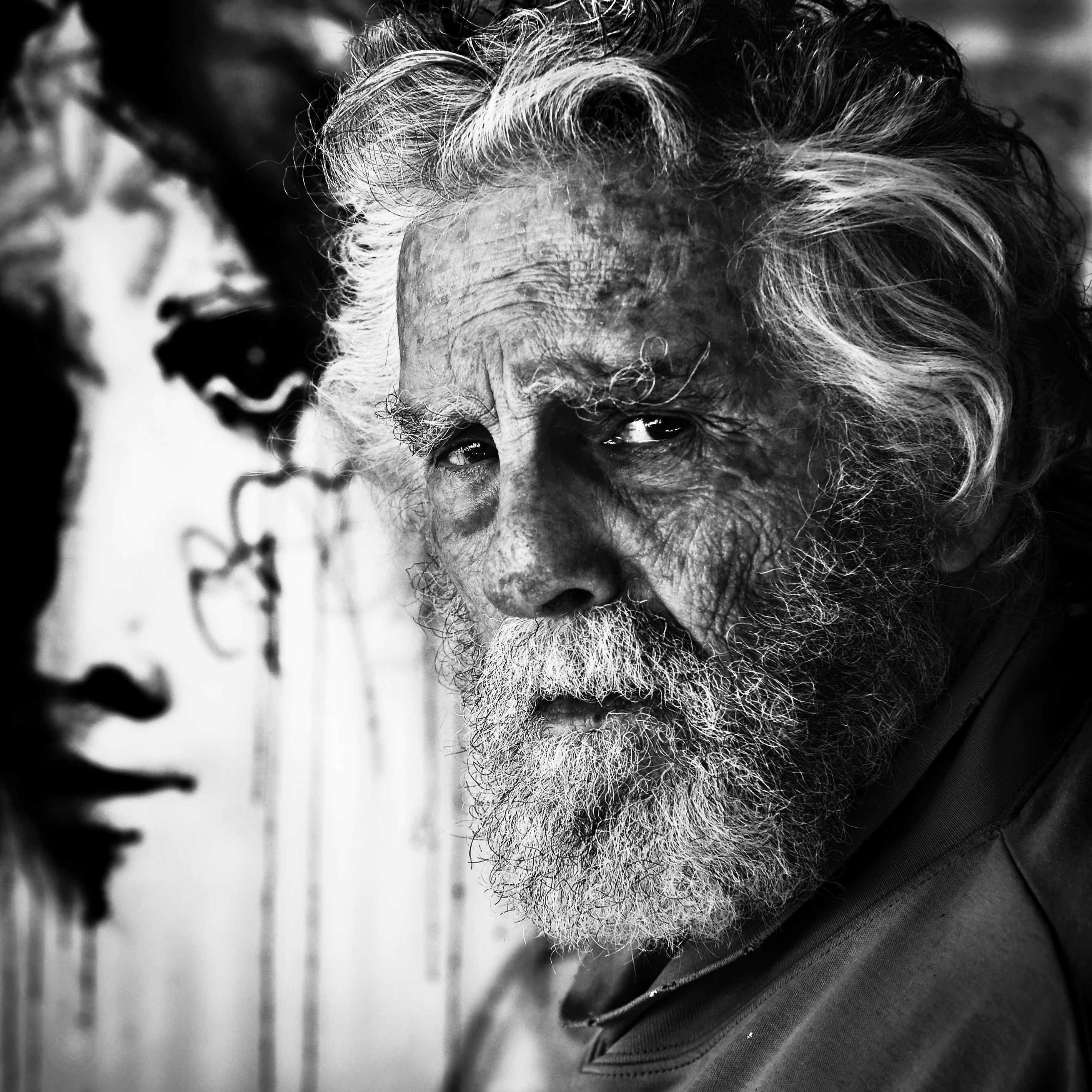

Eugene F. Hollander or Gino Hollander (1924 – August 27, 2015) was an American painter. He began painting in New York City during the abstract expressionist movement.

== Biography ==
=== Early life ===
Hollander's father was in the fur business, enabling the family to travel to Europe including a nine-month stay in Paris. At age 13, he experienced his first adventure with a 1,000-mile bike trip up the Connecticut River Valley alone. He was a member of the United States Army's 10th Mountain Division Ski Troops and is a veteran of World War II.

=== New York City ===
In the mid-20th century, he was a successful filmmaker along with his wife Barbara Hollander before he started painting in 1960, during the abstract expressionism movement in New York City. He became one of the group that defined this movement and whom all hung out at the famous Cedar Tavern. Acrylic paint was just emerging at that time and Hollander was among the first to explore its possibilities. From 1960-1962, he had his studio and the first Hollander Gallery on Bleecker Street, in Greenwich Village. During that time his paintings sold to the likes of Jacqueline Kennedy, Steve McQueen, Norman Rockwell, and Ralph Lauren.

=== Spain ===
Despite having experienced initial success in New York, Hollander moved his family to Spain in 1962, to find his voice in painting. He often bartered paintings to support his family while he continued developing his style. Hollander and his wife Barbara took their children on archaeological trips, following the road construction crews which were building new highways throughout Spain, unearthing ancient treasures. They created Museo Hollander, renamed Pizarra Municipal Museum , located in an old Cortijo. The museum was to exhibit this collection of Spanish artifacts that span along with Hollander's own paintings. In 1990, the Hollanders donated their museum to the government of Spain and were nationally awarded in honor of the King's birthdate a Medallion de Plata for contributing to the country's growth in tourism.

=== Aspen ===
After nearly 20 somewhat reclusive years in Aspen, Colorado during which he appeared in the film "Mountain Town", Hollander gave in to his lungs' demands in the near 8,000-foot altitude and moved with his wife Barbara to Ojai, California.

=== California ===
Hollander died, surrounded by his family, at the age of 91 in Newport Beach, California.

== Hollander Galleries ==
HG Sullivan St., Greenwich Village, NYC 1961 - 1st painting sold here.

HG, Bleecker St., Greenwich Village, NYC 1962-1967 - paintings sold here provided money for the move to Spain.

HG, 950 Madison Ave., NYC 1967-1972 - across from the Whitney Museum.

HG Torremolinos, Costa del Sol, Spain 1962-1963

HG Atalaya Park, Costa del Sol, Spain 1964-1985

HG Hotel Puente Romano, Marbella, Spain 1965-1985

HG Mount St., London 1966-1976

HG Marbella Club Hotel, Spain 1967-1990

HG Hollander-York, Toronto 1968-1980

HG West Broadway, NYC 1970-1982

HG Hamburg, Germany 1975-1978

HG Museo Hollander, Cortijo De Las Yeguas, Spain 1982-1990 – archeological museum as well as a charitable organization.

HG, Santa Fe, NM 2013–present. Currently located at 225 Delgado Street, Santa Fe, NM 87501

== Notes ==
Gino Hollander Website

=== Public Institutions ===
- Museo Bellas Artes
- Bristol Museum
- Aspen Art Museum
- Herbert F. Johnson Museum, Cornell University
- Sloane Kettering Hospital
- Ojai Valley Hospital
- New York University Art Collection, now Grey Art Gallery
- Shell Oil Co., Houston
- City College of New York
- New York Presbyterian Hospital
- Mount Sinai Hospital, New York
- Love Field, Dallas
- Pennsylvania Hospital
- Aspen Valley Hospital
- White Museum
- Museo Hollander
- National Jewish Medical Center
- Churchill College, Cambridge University
- La Galería de La Esquina A.C, Tijuana Baja California Mex.

=== Private and Estate Collections ===
- Artur Rubenstein
- James Michener
- Ralph Lauren
- John and Julie King
- Luciano Pavarotti
- Jeffrey N. Mahony
- John Crosby
- Morley Safer
- Jacqueline Kennedy
- Vizcondesa de Llanterno
- Alan Ladd
- Leontyne Price
- Herbert Kretzmer
- Ricky Nelson
- Oscar de la Renta
- Howard Head
- Taki Fukishima
- Van Cliburn
- Ben Thylan
- Vincent Sardi
- Faye Emerson
- Burt Lancaster
- John Mitchell
- Betty Pfister
- Isaac Stern
- Princess Maria Louisa de Prussia
- Sophia of Spain
- Count Schoenburg
- Condessa de Salamanca
- Geoffrey Beene
- John Houston
- William Pattis
- Norman Rockwell
- Brian Epstein
- Edward G. Robinson
- Steve McQueen
- Norman Mailer
- Arjun Gupta
- Leif Kreutzberg
- Anna & Lawrence Olsen
- David & Rhonda Saaks
- Donal Ward Collection
- Linda Pierson'
- Leon Chou
- William Brown
- S Edward Bothers
- J. Carrasco
- Brian D. Fay / Lawrence A. Grab, Jr.
- Stephen Lloyd Webb
- Francisco E.Dominguez
- Rose & Ralph Lachman
