= The Painter and the Pest =

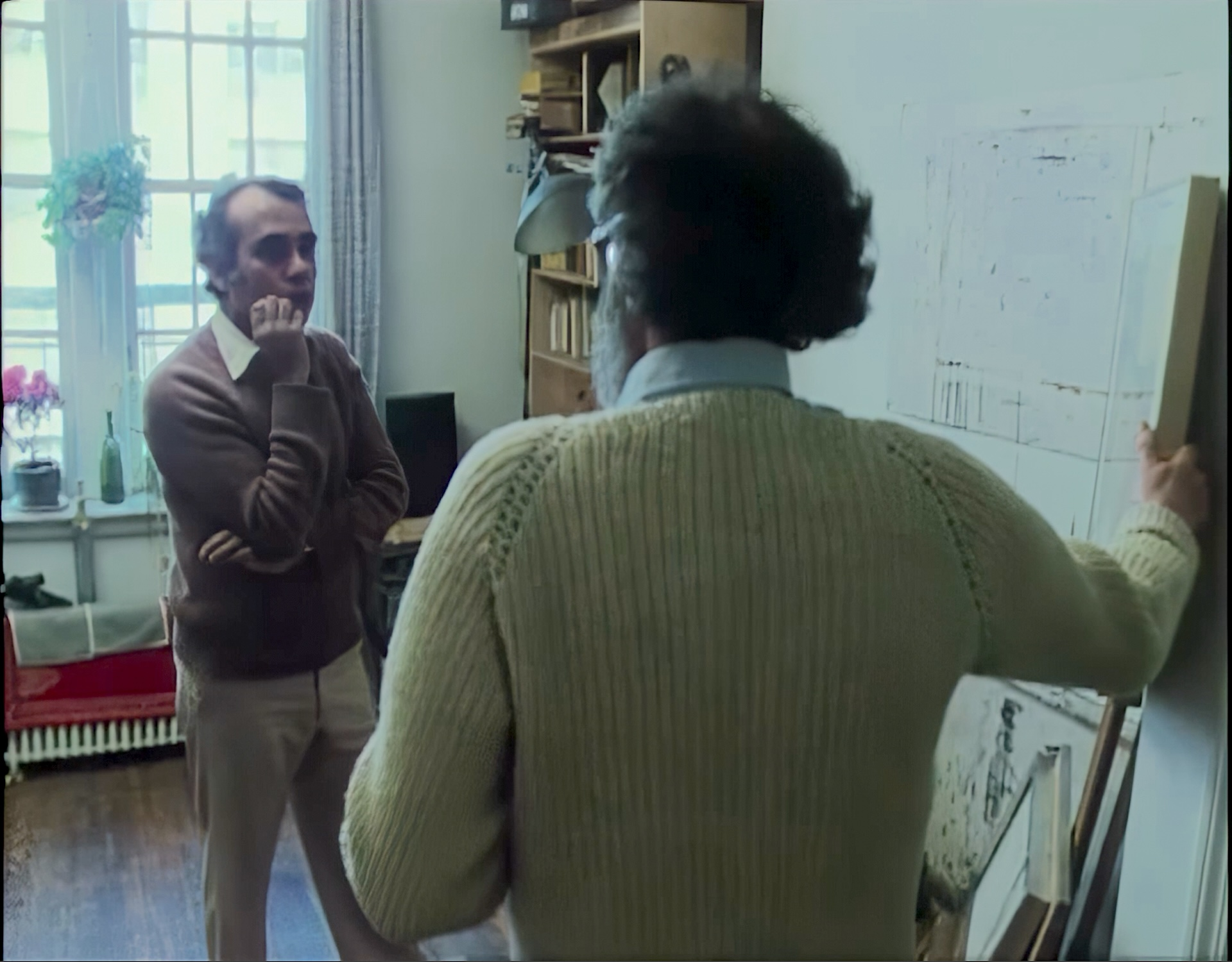
Akumal Ramachander with Harold Shapinsky in a still from The Painter and the Pest

The Painter and the Pest is a 1985 documentary film produced by Bandung Productions and released by British Channel 4 Television on June 2, 1985. It chronicles the story of the discovery of an unknown and impoverished abstract expressionist painter from New York, Harold Shapinsky, by an Indian professor Akumal Ramachander leading to his international recognition and fame.

The documentary was directed by Greg Lanning and narrated by Salman Rushdie, who opined that it was one of those happy instances in which the East has repaid the West by discovering something the West had forgotten.

== Synopsis ==
In 1984, Akumal Ramachander, an English professor and small time art promoter from India, was visiting the United States. At the University of Chicago he met graduate student David Shapinsky, who got Ramachander to view slides of his father Harold Shapinsky’s artwork. Harold Shapinsky was a hitherto unknown and impoverished abstract expressionist painter from New York. Enamoured by Shapinsky’s work, Akumal visited Shapinsky in his New York apartment and had the paintings professionally photographed.

Ramachander’s resolute efforts in championing Shapinsky’s work in New York and London led to Shapinsky having his first solo exhibition in his 40 year career at London’s Mayor Gallery in 1985. The resulting international recognition and fame of Shapinsky led to his revival as an important abstract expressionist, late in his career.

== Production and release ==
In describing Shapinsky’s “fairy tale” success story, Paula Span of the Washington Post wrote that, while in London promoting Shapinsky, Ramachander had contacted his friend Salman Rushdie, who in turn got political activist and filmmaker Tariq Ali to arrange the production of a documentary about the Ramachander-Shapinsky story. Lawrence Weschler in The Wanderer in the Perfect City was present during the filming at Shapinsky's studio. He described the cramped conditions in which director Greg Lanning had to contend with in filming the interaction between Shapinsky and James Mayor of the Mayor Gallery.

The documentary, which managed to feature the opening day events of the Shapinsky exhibition in May 1985, first aired on Channel 4 Television in June 1985 while the exhibition was underway. The documentary, along with Salman Rushdie’s article appearing in The Observer, evidently played a role in the success of the exhibition. Paula Span noted that the Mayor Gallery normally attracted about 20 to 30 visitors per day, but the Shapinsky exhibition was drawing in 50 an hour.
