= Satoru Abe =

Japanese American sculptor and painter (1926–2025)

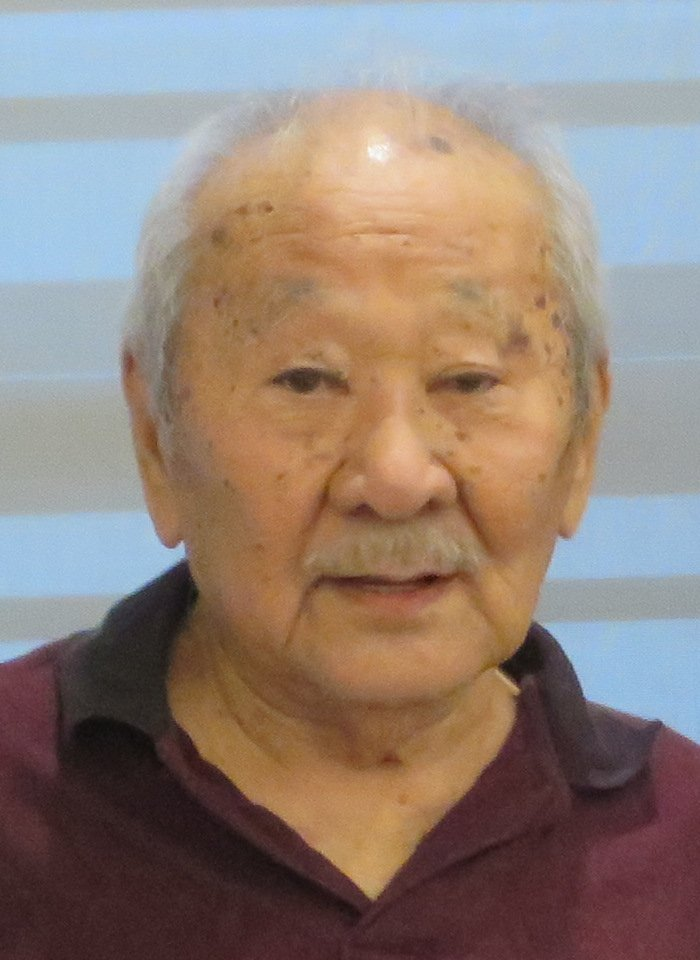
- Satoru Abe in 2016
- Born: June 13, 1926; Moiliili, Hawaii Territory, U.S.
- Died: February 4, 2025 (aged 98)
- Website: satoruabe.com

Satoru Abe (June 13, 1926 – February 4, 2025) was an American sculptor and painter renowned for his abstract works inspired by natural forms, particularly trees. Born in Moʻiliʻili, Honolulu, Hawaii, Abe played a pivotal role in the Hawaiian modernist movement and was a founding member of the Metcalf Chateau, a collective of seven Asian American artists. Over a prolific career spanning several decades, his art garnered national recognition, with pieces featured in prominent institutions such as the Honolulu Museum of Art and the Hawaii State Art Museum. In 1984, he was honored as a "Living Treasure" by the Honpa Hongwanji Mission of Hawaii, reflecting his significant contributions to the arts in Hawaii and beyond.

== Life and career ==
Satoru Abe, East and West, welded copper and bronze, 1971, Hawaii State Art Museum

Two Abstract Figures, oil on canvas painting by Satoru Abe, c. 1955, Honolulu Museum of Art

Abe was born in Moʻiliʻili, a district of Honolulu, Hawaii. He attended President William McKinley High School, where he took art lessons from Shirley Ximena Hopper Russell. After graduating from high school he worked for the Dairymen's Association. In 1947 he began taking art lessons from Hon Chew Hee and decided to pursue an art career in New York City. On his way to New York, in 1948, Abe spent a summer at the California School for Fine Arts. When he reached New York Abe attended the Art Students League of New York where he studied with Yasuo Kuniyoshi, George Grosz, Louis Bouche, and Jon Corbino. From 1948 to 1959, Abe traveled to New York regularly. He married Ruth, a fellow student from Wahiawa, and they returned to Hawaii in 1950.

In Hawaii Abe met local artist Isami Doi, who would become a close friend and mentor. Although Abe began as a painter, he learned welding from Bumpei Akaji in 1951, and the two artists began a series of copper work experiments. During these few years in Hawaii, Abe also formed the Metcalf Chateau with Bumpei Akaji, Edmund Chung, Tetsuo Ochikubo, Jerry T. Okimoto, James Park, and Tadashi Sato. Their first group exhibition was in 1954.

In 1956, Abe returned to New York and found a creative home at the SculptureCenter, where his work attracted the attention of gallery owners and others. In 1963, Abe was awarded a Guggenheim Fellowship. Abe returned to Hawai'i in 1970, and in the same year was offered a National Endowment for the Arts Artist-in-residence grant.

Abe died on February 4, 2025, at the age of 98. Abe believed in reincarnation, which influenced his work.

== Works ==
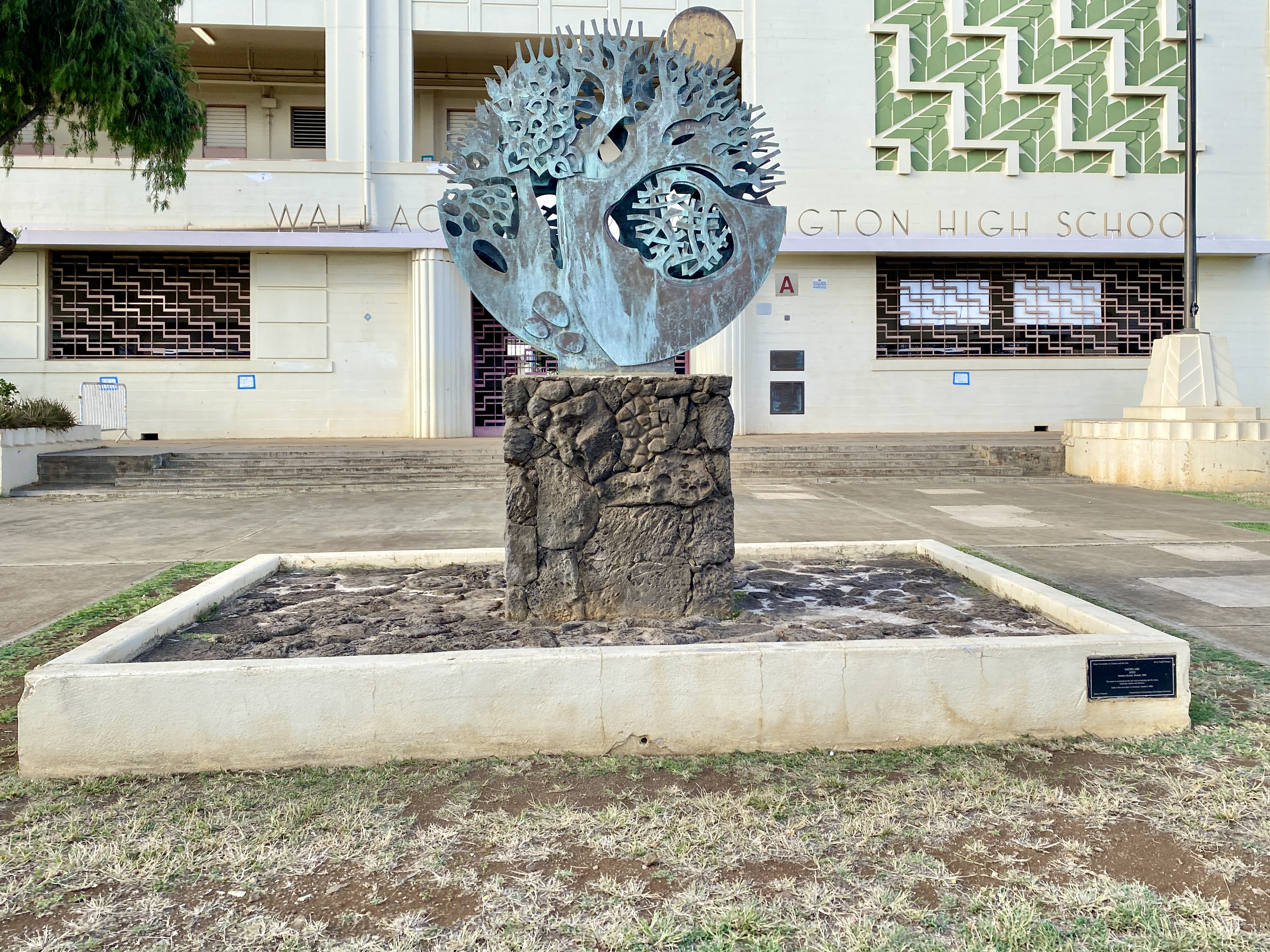
The Seed, bronze sculpture, 1995, Hawaiʻi State Foundation on Culture and the Arts

Abe is best known for his sculptures of abstracted natural forms, many of which resemble trees, such as East and West in the collection of the Hawaii State Art Museum. He also painted. Two Abstract Figures in the collection of the Honolulu Museum of Art typifies this aspect of his work. The Honolulu Museum of Art and the Hawaii State Art Museum are among the public collections that hold Abe's works. His sculptures in public places include:

- Three Rocks on a Hill, Honolulu Community College, Honolulu, Hawaii, 1975
- Among the Ruins, Leeward Community College, Honolulu, Hawaii, 1973
- Tree of Knowledge, Nanakuli High and Intermediate School, Nanakuli, Hawaii, 1971
- Enchanting Garden, President William McKinley High School, Honolulu, Hawaii, 1983
- Three Clouds, Honolulu International Airport, Honolulu, Hawaii, 1974
- An Island of Trees, Honolulu International Airport, Diamond Head Extension, Honolulu, Hawaii, 1987
- The Seed, Farrington High School, Honolulu, Hawaii, 1995
- Reaching for the Sun, Hawaii Convention Center, Honolulu, Hawaii, 1997
- Early Spring, 'Aiea High School, Honolulu, Hawaii, 1976
- A Community Surrounded by Sugar Cane, Ka'imiloa Elementary School, Honolulu, Hawaii, 1978
- Moon Beyond the Fence, Pearl City High School, Honolulu, Hawaii, 1981
- Spring, Summer, Autumn, James B. Castle High School, Honolulu, Hawaii, 1980
- Five Logs on a Hill, Kau High and Pahala Elementary School, Pahala, Hawaii, 1975
- Landscape on the Ocean, Waiakea High School, Waiakea, Hawaii, 1983
- Reaching for the Sun, Iao School, Wailuku, Hawaii, 1981
- A Path Through the Trees, Maui High School, Kahului, Hawaii, 1977
- Trees, Vines, Rocks, and Petroglyphs, Lanai Community School, Lanai City, Hawaii, 1976
- Boulders, Salt Pond and Taro Fields, Eleele Elementary School, Eleele, Hawaii, 1989
- Aged Tree, Kauikeaouli Hale, Honolulu, Hawaii, 1976
- Untitled sculpture, Leilehua High School, Honolulu, Hawaii, 1976
- Volcano, Aloha Stadium, Honolulu, Hawaii, 1980
- Growing Out From the Wheel, The Contemporary Museum at First Hawaiian Center, Honolulu, Hawaii, 2006
- Kukui ʻĀ Mau I Ke Ao Mālamalama (A Torch That Continues to Burn During the Day), Keoneʻae Skyline station, East Kapolei, Hawaii, 2021
