= Albert Alcalay =

American painter (1917–2008)

Albert Alcalay (August 17, 1917, in Paris – March 29, 2008, in Boston) was an American abstract artist, also known as an abstract expressionism artist.

== Life ==
Albert Alcalay was born in Paris in 1917, a son of Samuel and Lepa Alcalay, both of whom were born in Serbia. On the eve of the outbreak of World War I, his banker father had been moved from Belgrade to Paris, and when the war ended, the family returned to Belgrade. There, whilst attending secondary school, young Albert was apprenticed to an artist. At that time, he began studying architecture. When World War II started, he joined the Yugoslavian army.

It was not long before Yugoslavia surrendered and he became a prisoner of war where he was imprisoned in the Ferramonti internment camp. Upon regaining freedom, he settled in Rome, where he began painting. In 1951, he and his wife Vera, moved to the United States. He had his first individual show at the Swetzoff Gallery in 1952. In 1959, he was a Guggenheim Fellow. He taught at Harvard University, from 1960 to 1982. Alcalay's work is in the permanent collections of the Museum of Modern Art in New York, the Fogg Art Museum in Cambridge, the Museum of Modern Art in Rome, Colby College, Simmons College, Smith College and the University of Massachusetts, among others. He lived on Martha's Vineyard.

The story of Alcalay's escape from German Nazis and Italian Fascists, his development as a painter, his immigration to the United States where he became one of the founders of Harvard’s Department of Visual and Environmental Studies (VES), and his struggle to remain creative despite severe health problems, is told in the film Albert Alcalay: Self Portraits, which premiered in January 2004 at the Harvard Film Archive. The film can be viewed on Vimeo.

== Exhibitions ==
- 2008 "Albert Alcalay: Self Portraits", Fort Worth Modern
- 2009 Remembering Albert Alcalay, Carpenter Center for the Visual Arts
