= Taro Yamamoto (artist) =

American artist (1919–1994)

- Born: October 29, 1919; Hollywood, California, U.S.
- Died: June 12, 1994 (aged 74); Provincetown, Massachusetts, U.S.
- Known for: Painting
- Movement: Abstract expressionism
- Spouse: Gwynneth Cotton (m. 1955)

Taro Yamamoto (October 29, 1919 – June 12, 1994) belonged to the New York School Abstract Expressionist artists whose artistic innovation by the 1950s had been recognized across the Atlantic, including Paris.

== Biography ==
Yamamoto was born October 29, 1919, in Hollywood, California. He lived in Japan from age six to age nineteen. Yamamoto served in the U.S. Army during World War II, from November 7, 1941, to February 23, 1946.

Yamamoto studied: 1949 at the Santa Monica City College; 1950–1952 at The Art Students League of New York, under Yasuo Kuniyoshi, Morris Kantor, Byron Browne and Vaclav Vytlacil; 1951–1953 at the Hans Hofmann School of Fine Arts in New York City.

Yamamoto in 1952 won the John Sloan Memorial Fellowship at The Art Students League of New York. In 1953, under the Edward G. McDowell Traveling Fellowship, he went to Europe.

He married Gwynneth Cotton, a naturalized English woman, in 1955, and they lived in Wellfleet, Massachusetts. They were active at the Universalist Church of Provincetown.

Yamamoto died in Provincetown in 1994.

== Selected solo exhibitions ==
- 1953: Gallerie Huit, Paris;
- 1955: The Art Students League of New York, NYC;
- 1960–1962: Krasner Gallery, NYC;
- 1963–1964: 371 Gallery, Provincetown, MA;

== Selected group exhibitions ==
- 1951: Pennsylvania Academy of Fine Arts;
- 1952: NY Contemporary Gallery, NYC;
- 1952, 1955, 1956, 1962: Provincetown Art Association & Museum, Provincetown, MA;
- 1953: "New York Painting and Sculpture Annual," Stable Gallery, NYC;
- 1958: Riverside Museum, NYC;
- 1960: University of Minnesota and Dayton Art Institute;
- 1957, 1965: Guild Hall Museum, East Hampton, NY

== See also ==
- Action painting

== Books ==
- Marika Herskovic, New York School Abstract Expressionists Artists Choice by Artists, (New York School Press, 2000.) ISBN 0-9677994-0-6. p. 33; p. 39; p. 378-381

== External links for image reproduction ==
- Taro Yamamoto paintings from artnet.com
