= Joseph Goto =

American artist

No. 24, welded steel sculpture by Joseph Goto, 1965, Honolulu Museum of Art

Joseph Goto (1916–1994) was an American sculptor, best known for his abstract-expressionist welded steel sculptures. He was born in Hilo, Hawaii, and learned welding in the United States Army during the Second World War. In the late 1940s, Goto studied sculpture at the Art Institute of Chicago. He taught at Brandeis University, Carnegie Mellon University, the Rhode Island School of Design, and the University of Michigan.

Goto's sculptures range from table-top size to large scale public works. No. 24 in the collection of the Honolulu Museum of Art is typical of his small-scale works. The Art Institute of Chicago, the Butler Institute of American Art (Youngstown, OH), the Honolulu Museum of Art, the Kresge Art Museum (East Lansing), the Museum of Modern Art (New York), the Nelson-Atkins Museum of Art (Kansas City, MO), and the Rhode Island School of Design are among the public collections holding works by Joseph Goto.
