= Pizarra Municipal Museum =

Museum in Spain

Coordinates: 36.74854°N 4.70132°W

Pizarra Municipal Museum is located in an Old Cortijo in the town of Pizarra very near the city of Málaga in the Costa del Sol. It was restored in early 1990s and contain all Gino Hollander's old Spanish artifacts with Gino's original paintings. Today, the museum has a typical Spanish food restaurant and a hotel.
