= Tetsuo Ochikubo =

Japanese-American painter (1923–1975)

Tetsuo Ochikubo (1923–1975), also known as Bob Ochikubo, was a Japanese-American painter, sculpture, and printmaker who was born in Waipahu, Hawaii, Honolulu county, Hawaii. During the Second World War, he served with the 100th Battalion of the 442nd Regimental Combat Team. After being discharged from the Army, he studied painting and design at the School of the Art Institute of Chicago and at the Art Students League of New York. In 1953, he spent a year in Japan, studying traditional brush painting and connecting with his ancestry. He worked at Tamarind Institute in the 1960s and is best known for his entirely abstract paintings and lithographs. Along with Satoru Abe, Bumpei Akaji, Edmund Chung, Jerry T. Okimoto, James Park, and Tadashi Sato, Ochikubo was a member of the Metcalf Chateau, a group of seven Asian-American artists with ties to Honolulu. Ochikubo died in Kawaihae, Hawaii in 1975.

== Education ==
- Waipahu High School, Waipahu, Oahu, Hawaii.
- University of Hawaiʻi, 1946.
- Chicago Art Institute, 1947–48.
- Ray Vogue School of Art, Chicago, 1947–48.
- Art Students League, 1951–52, 1956–60.
- Private instruction in Oriental Brush Painting (with Takehiko Mohri, Tokyo, Japan, 1953).
- Pratt Institute, New York, 1960.

== Positions held ==
- Instructor, (watercolor and painting), Adult Education Program, McKinley High School, Honolulu, Hawaii, 1950–51.
- Visiting Artist - Department of Art, University of Mississippi, University, Mississippi, 1960.
- Supervisor, Graphic Workshop, Art Students League, New York, 1960–61.
- Professor, Mary Washington College, University of Virginia, Fredericksburg, Virginia, 1961–63.
- Professor, School of Art, Syracuse University, 1964–72.
- National Endowment for the Arts, Artist in Residence, Hawaii, 1972.
- Professor, School of Art, University of Hawaiʻi, Hilo, 1972–75.

== Honors and distinctions ==
- Thekla M. Bernays Scholarship, Art Students League, 1956–57.
- John Hay Whitney Foundation Fellowship, 1957–58.
- John Simon Guggenheim Memorial Fellowship, 1958–59.
- Tamarind Lithography Workshop Fellowship, Los Angeles, 1960.

== Selected permanent collections ==
- The Cincinnati Art Museum, Cincinnati, Ohio.
- Honolulu Museum of Art, Honolulu, Hawaii.
- Print Club (now called The Print Center), Philadelphia, Pennsylvania.
- Art Students League of New York, New York City, New York.
- The Library of Congress, Washington, D.C.
- Albright–Knox Art Gallery, Buffalo, New York.
- Mary Washington College, Fredericksburg, Virginia.
- Chrysler Museum of Art, Norfolk, Virginia.
- Syracuse University, Syracuse, New York.
- Fine Arts Section, US Information Agency, Washington, D.C.
- Oswego State University, Oswego, New York.
- St. Lawrence University, Canton, New York.
- De Cordova Museum, Lincoln, Massachusetts.
- Hawaii State Foundation on Culture and the Arts, Honolulu, Hawaii.
- Hirshhorn Museum and Sculpture Garden, Smithsonian Institution, Washington, D.C.
- Fine Arts Museums of San Francisco, San Francisco, California.
- National Gallery of Art, Washington, D.C.

== Major commissions in Hawaii ==
- Hilo Intermediate School, Untitled, Bronze and aluminum sculpture, Hilo, Hawaii, 1972.
- Waiakeawaina Elementary School, Harmony, Copper and steel sculpture, Hilo, Hawaii, 1973.
- Kona Hospital, Altruism, Corten steel and enamel sculpture, Kona, Hawaii, 1975.

== One man shows ==
- Library of Hawaii, Honolulu, Hawaii, 1949.
- Club 100, Memorial Building, Honolulu, Hawaii, 1952.
- Honolulu Y.B.A. Hall, Hawaii, 1953.
- Honolulu Academy of Arts, Hawaii, 1955.
- Columbia Museum, Columbia, South Carolina, 1959.
- The Gallery, Hawaii, 1959.
- Tweed Gallery, University of Minnesota, Duluth, 1960.
- University of Mississippi, Mississippi, 1960.
- Delta State College, Mississippi, 1960.
- Krasner Galleries, New York City, New York, 1958–72.
- Mary Washington College, Fredericksburg, Virginia, 1963.
- Franz Bader Galler, Washington, D.C., 1963.
- Print Club, Pennsylvania, 1964.
- Syracuse University, Syracuse, New York, 1964.
- Jewish Community Center, Syracuse, New York, 1966.
- Contemporary Art Center of Hawaii, Honolulu, Hawaii, 1973.
- John Young Museum of Art, University of Hawaiʻi at Mānoa, 2022.
