= Organic Surrealism =

Surrealist art categorization

Organic Surrealism is one of the two main poles in the surrealist movement in the visual arts. It is characterized by automatist techniques, which its practitioners use in order to liberate unconscious associations in order to allow their creative imaginations to emerge in an open-ended manner. Some noted artists who have been characterized as organic surrealists are Joan Miró, André Masson, and Max Ernst.

The early work of some of the artists active in the Dada movement can be considered to fall into this category. Organic surrealism was one of the major precursors to abstract expressionism.
