= Jerry T. Okimoto =

Laminated white pine and plywood sculpture by Jerry T. Okimoto in the Hawaii State Art Museum

Jerry T. Okimoto (Jerry Tsukio Okamoto; 1924–1998) was a Japanese-American painter and sculptor who was born in Waianae, Hawaii.

== Double image ==
Okimoto is best known for his minimalist works consisting of several solid colored, geometrically shaped pieces of stretched canvas fitted together to form a single work. Since these works are essentially two-dimensional, they challenge the distinction between painting and sculpture. Double Image further challenges this distinction, in that it is totally abstract, but strongly suggests a vanishing point. In some of these works, the individual stretched canvases are moveable and are intended to be rearranged. He also created non-moveable minimalist sculptures (such as laminated white pine and plywood sculpture in the Hawaii State Art Museum).

Mobile Painting #5, acrylic on canvas painting with moveable panel by Jerry T. Okimoto, c. 1975

Along with Satoru Abe, Bumpei Akaji, Edmund Chung, Tetsuo Ochikubo, James Park, and Tadashi Sato, Okimoto was a member of the Metcalf Chateau, a group of seven Asian-American artists with ties to Honolulu.

The Hawaii State Art Museum, the Honolulu Museum of Art, the Michelson Museum of Art (Marshall, Texas), the University of Michigan Museum of Art (Ann Arbor, Michigan), and the Whitney Museum of American Art (New York City) are among the public collections holding work by Jerry Okimoto. Jerry Okimoto died in 1998.
