= Kauaʻi Community College =

Community college in Lihue, Hawaii, U.S.

- Type: Public community college
- Established: 1926; 100 years ago
- Parent institution: University of Hawaiʻi System
- Accreditation: ACCJC
- Academic affiliations: Space-grant
- Chancellor: Margaret Sanchez
- Location: Līhuʻe, Hawaiʻi, United States; 21°58.19′N 159°23.87′W
- Website: kauai.hawaii.edu

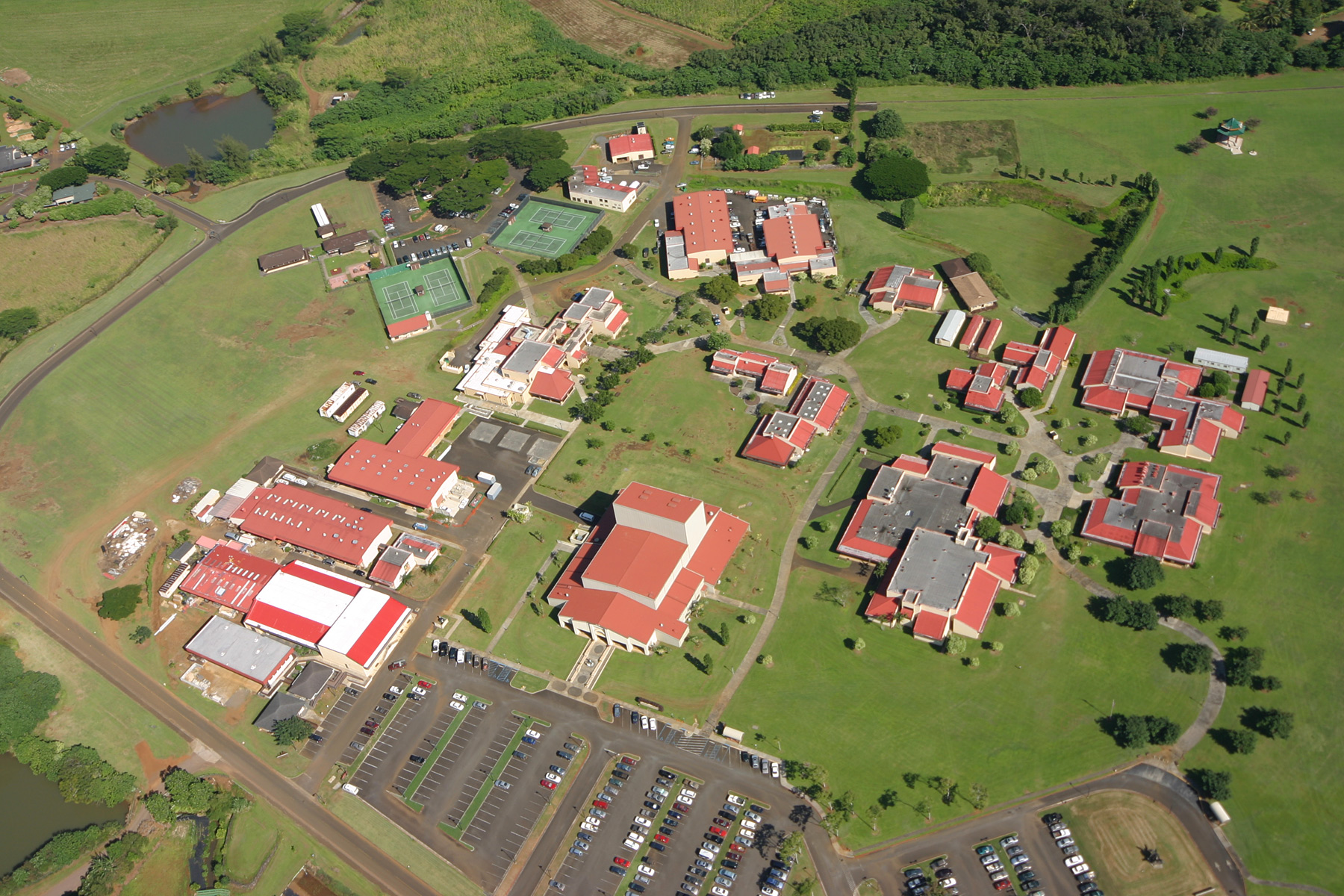
2004 aerial view of Kauai Community College

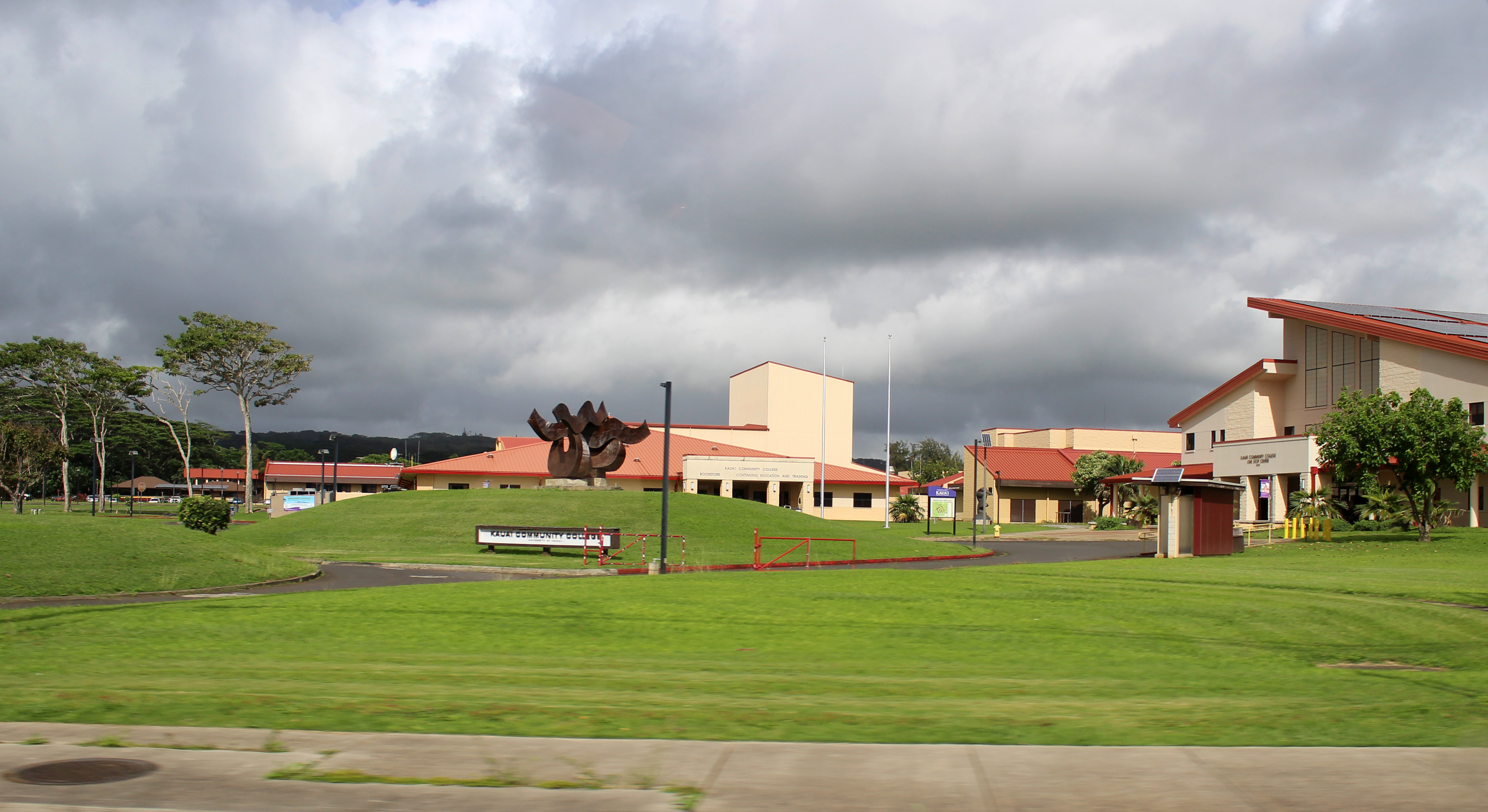
2021 ground-level view of Kauai Community College

Kauaʻi Community College is a public community college in Līhuʻe, Hawaiʻi and it is the only institution of higher learning on the island. It is part of the University of Hawaiʻi System and is accredited by the Accrediting Commission for Community and Junior Colleges.

== History ==
Kauaʻi Community College (Kauaʻi CC) was established in 1926 as a vocational school within the State of Hawaiʻi Department of Education. In 1965, Kaua'i CC became a comprehensive community college and was transferred to the University of Hawaiʻi (UH) System as one of the seven colleges in the University of Hawaiʻi Community College System.

== Academics ==
The college awards degrees and certificates in Associate in Arts (AA) in Liberal Arts; Associate in Science (AS); Associate in Applied Science (AAS); Associate in Technical Studies (ATS); Certificate of Achievement (CA); Certificate of Completion (CC); Certificate of Competence (CO); and Academic Subject Certificate (ASC).

In addition to degree and certificate programs, Kaua'i CC also offers non-credit courses for businesses and lifelong learning and advanced courses leading to Bachelors and Graduate degrees. The college primarily serves residents from the islands of Kauaʻi and Ni'ihau, with a special commitment to Native Hawaiians.

These programs are accredited by: National Automotive Technician Education Foundation (NATEF), American Culinary Federation Education Foundation Accrediting Commission, Accreditation of Allied Health Education Programs (CAAHEP), and the Accreditation Commission of Education in Nursing (ACEN).

== Campus art ==
Campus art includes:

- Ke Mau Nei Ke Ea O Kaua'i I Puhi Aina Malu, copper and bronze sculpture by Bumpei Akaji, 1977
- Spiritual Stones, ceramic sculpture by Randy Naoto Hokushin, 1980
- Celebrating the Arts, granite and bronze sculpture by Ken Shutt, 1999
- Kauai Counterpoint, painted steel sculpture by Robert Alan Flynn, 1978
- Under the Pacific, enamel on steel sculpture by Hon-Chew Hee, 1979

== Kauaʻi Community College Performing Arts Center ==
The Kauaʻi Community College Performing Arts Center is a 560-seat venue and cultural exhibition center. It is available for rental by non-profit organizations that focus on culture and the arts. It maintains a schedule of events on its home page.

== See also ==
- Kauaʻi Educational Association for Science and Astronomy (KEASA)
