= Harold Shapinsky =

American painter

Harold Shapinsky (May 21, 1925 – January 31, 2004) was an American abstract expressionist painter, born in Brooklyn, New York.

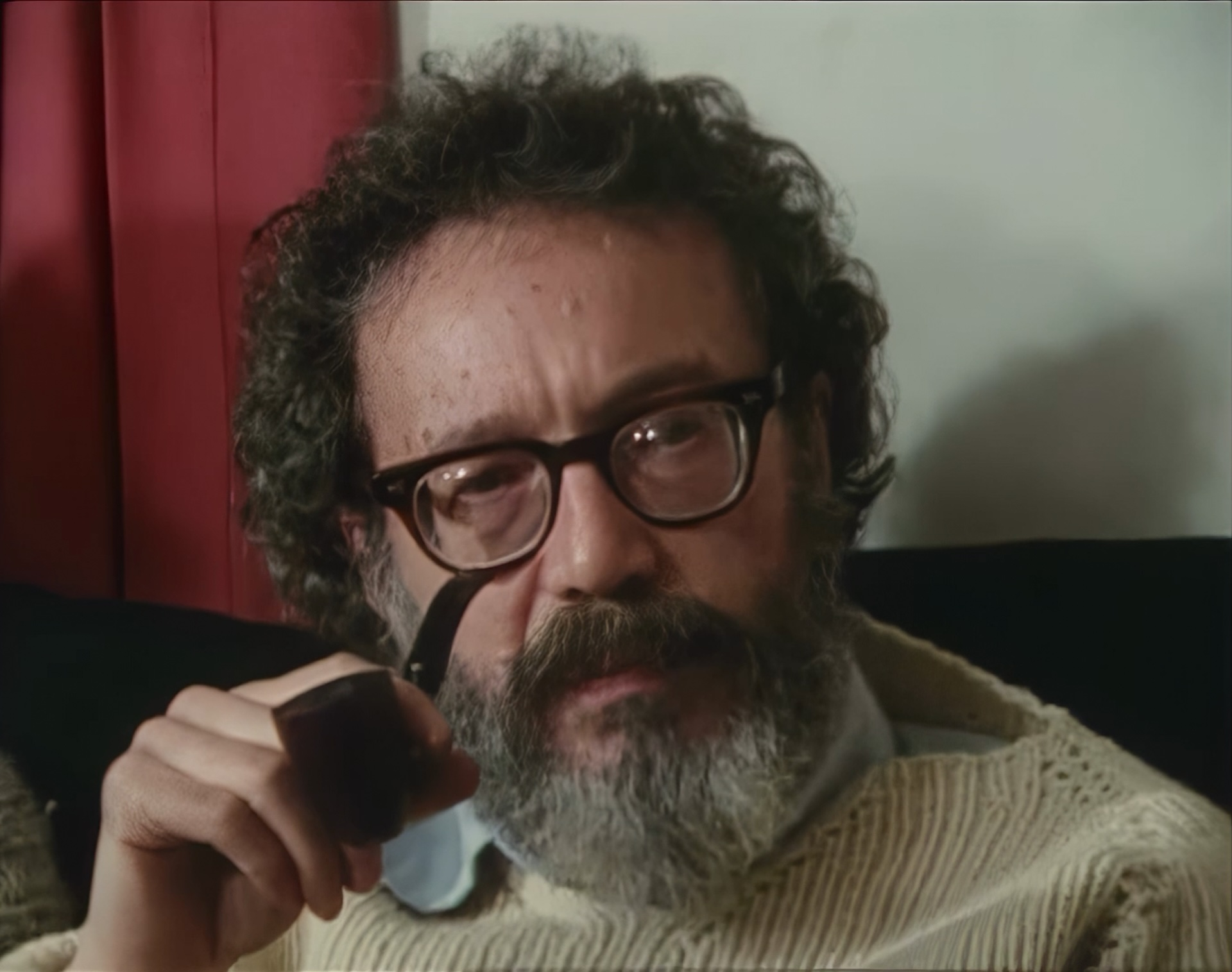
Harold Shapinksky in a still from Channel 4 Television's The Painter and the Pest, 1985

== Family ==
His father was David Shapinsky (born circa 1896), a "cutter" in the garment trades. His mother, Alice Wolfe Shapinsky (born circa 1902), was very young when they met in the subway, according to some family stories.

Both David and Alice were born in eastern Europe and came to the United States in the early part of the century. They had four sons: Aaron (December 8, 1919 – March 1984), Murray (d. February 1970), Harold, and Buck. Young Harold was a gifted artist. Unfortunately, the family endured a bitter divorce, and afterwards his mother married Alex Matos, originally from Puerto Rico. Neither his mother nor his stepfather supported the young Harold's aspirations.

== Early life ==
He struggled very much on his own, occasionally assisted by his brothers. He had several breakdowns along the way. In one instance, he was not eating properly and had no money, became sick and was thrown out of his apartment. His paintings were thrown into the street. Some were rescued by his brother Aaron. Some of his early work was destroyed by his parents or painted over by his stepfather.

He served in the US Army in the 1950s, ultimately receiving a discharge due to his mental instability.

While Harold Shapinsky ultimately found some encouragement from a circle of artists that would be known as the "New York School" of abstract expressionism, he became an associate of Jackson Pollock.

== Marriage ==
Shapinsky met and married modern dancer Katherine "Kate" Peters (March 16, 1920 – January 22, 2005), the daughter of Frazier Forman and Katherine Harrower Peters. The two were both considered black sheep by their families. They had one child, David Frazier Shapinsky, born 1960.

== Fame ==
In 1985, an Indian professor of English, Akumal Ramachander, met Harold's son in Chicago purely by circumstance. The son, David, uncharacteristically showed Akumal slides of Harold's work. Ramachander decided to promote the artist claiming that exposing Shapinsky to the world stage was part of his personal destiny. He contacted Lawrence Weschler, a writer at The New Yorker, and helped organize Shapinsky's first one-man show, at London's Mayor Gallery.

The exhibition, which was held between May 21 and June 22, 1985, turned out to be hugely successful. The Washington Post reported that the Mayor Gallery normally attracted 20 to 30 visitors a day, but the Shapinsky exhibition drew in 50 an hour, with his paintings selling for $25,000 on average.

As a result, Shapinsky became a 'revived artist' as an abstract impressionist. He spent the next 15 years in relative comfort from some resulting sales. To date, Shapinsky's works have garnered international renown; some reside at the Tate, presented anonymously by the Mayor Gallery and also continue to be featured in exhibitions in New York.

The British Channel 4 Television produced a documentary called The Painter and the Pest, which was narrated by Salman Rushdie, about the serendipitous Shapinsky-Ramachander story. It was released in the UK by Channel 4 on June 2, 1985.

== Last years ==
In 2001, when his wife could no longer care for him, as he was suffering from Alzheimer's dementia along with blindness, he was moved to Collingswood Nursing Home near Rockville, Maryland. His wife then moved to Friendship Terrace, a retirement community in Washington, D.C. By this time, the couple had no resources to speak of, despite his past fame, and their care cost was largely met by their son.

Shapinsky died at the age of 78 on January 31, 2004. His wife died the following year on January 22, 2005. Both are buried together at the Garden of Remembrance Cemetery in Maryland.
