= Kauaʻi Educational Association for Science and Astronomy =

Observatory on Kaua'i, Hawaii, US

KEASA Observatory
- Organization: Kauaʻi Educational Association for Science and Astronomy
- Location: Mana, Kauaʻi, Hawaii, US
- Coordinates: 21.983°N 159.75°W
- Altitude: 3 metres (9.8 ft)
- Established: 1989
- Website: www.keasa.org

The Kauaʻi Educational Association for Science and Astronomy (KEASA) is a non-profit educational astronomical organization located in Mana on the Hawaiian island of Kauaʻi. It was founded in 1989. It meets monthly for star watches. Its observatory is the largest on the island and takes advantage of Kauaʻi's unique weather and topology which provide some of the best conditions for star gazing at sea level.

== Observatory ==
The KEASA observatory is located on the west side of Kauaʻi at the Pacific Missile Range Facility near Barking Sands Beach at an altitude of 3 metres (9.8 ft). It is funded as a joint venture with Kauaʻi Community College.

The observatory houses the Bob Byers telescopes:

- A 17-inch PlaneWave Instruments corrected Dall-Kirkham Cassegrain reflector
- A Celestron HD11
- A Televue NP101

== See also ==
- List of astronomical societies
