= Ralph Iwamoto =

American painter

Aurora by Ralph Iwamoto, 1957

Green Moss Figure by Ralph Iwamoto, 1955

Ralph Shigeto Iwamoto (1927–2013) was an American abstract painter born in Honolulu, Hawaii. From 1945 to 1952, he served in the Saitama Prefecture of occupied Japan with the 441st Counter Intelligence Corps of the United States Army. After military service, he settled in New York City.

Although best known for his abstract and minimalist paintings, in 1955, he produced a group of surrealist canvases influenced by both Wifredo Lam and the flora of Hawaii. Green Moss Figure is an example. Aurora, from 1957, demonstrates the artist's use of muted colors and organic forms in his abstract work. The Butler Institute of American Art (Youngstown, Ohio), the Herbert F. Johnson Museum of Art (Cornell University, Ithaca, NY), the Honolulu Museum of Art, the New Mexico Museum of Art (Santa Fe), and the Weatherspoon Art Museum (Greensboro, North Carolina) are among the public collections holding work by Ralph Iwamoto.
