= Jacques Démoulin =

French painter and printmaker

- Born: December 7, 1905; Bohain, France
- Died: November 29, 1991; Acquigny, France
- Known for: Painter
- Movement: Cubism, Expressionism

Signature
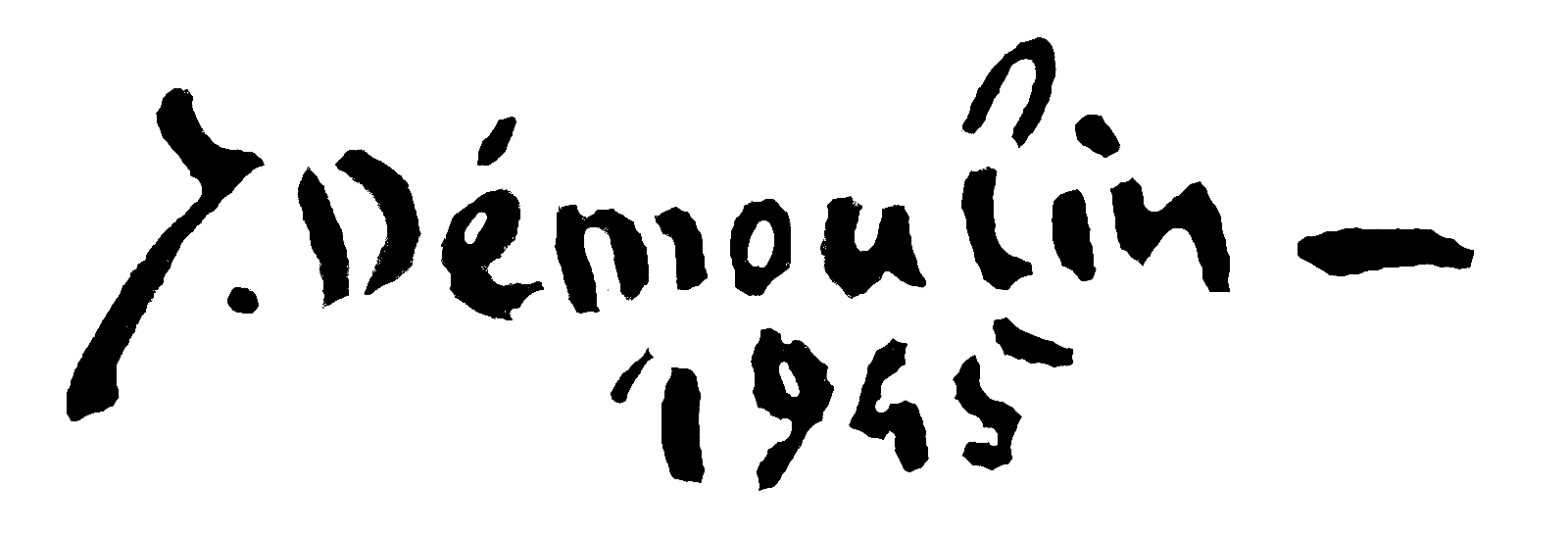

Jacques Démoulin (7 December 1905, in Bohain – 29 November 1991, in Acquigny), was a French ballet dancer and painter.

== Biography ==
In 1923 after three years of evening drawing lessons at the school of the city of Paris, he entered the school of applied arts. Genre scenes, landscapes, still lifes, flowers, portraits. Jacques Démoulin studied at the École des Arts Appliqués and the École des Arts Décoratifs in Paris and under Bernard Naudin and Jules Adler.

From 1924, he began his career as a painter.

In 1926, he also took classes at the theater workshop directed by Charles Dullin. After a few roles, he discovered dance thanks to Anna Stephann and left the theater to devote himself to a career as a dancer.

In 1929 he joined the troupe of the Russian Opera in Paris, then the Paris Opera where he danced in most of the ballets directed by Serge Lifar (Sergei Diaghilev troupe).

He remained at the Opera for 13 years, while continuing his work as a painter and press illustrator. From 1952 he moved from neo-cubism to expressionism in pictorially. He met many personalities of Arts and Letters such as Picasso, Louis Leiris, Picabia and especially H. D. Kahnveiller with whom he spent his holidays. A unionized dancer, he fights and obtains equal pay for dancers.

In 1953, while on vacation in Morbihan, he discovered the burial mounds of Gravrini (-3000 BC) and in particular the engraved stones, which would notoriously influence his work for many years.

In 1970 settled in Normandy, he became a member of the UAP SER.

== Notes ==
- Bénézit 2011: Démoulin, Henri Émile Jacques
