= Harry Tsuchidana =

American painter (1932–2026)

Topographic Landscape by Harry Tsuchidana, ink on paper

Untitled, Red and Gray from the Stage Series by Harry Tsuchidana, 1982

Harry Suyemi Tsuchidana (May 28, 1932 – October 20, 2026) was an American abstract painter. He was born in Waipahu, Hawaii Territory to parents who owned a two-acre farm. Tsuchidana enlisted in the United States Marine Corps upon graduation from high school in 1952. When discharged from the Marines in 1955, he enrolled in the Corcoran School of Art (Washington, D. C.). He then moved to New York City, where he studied at the Brooklyn Museum Art School, and at the Pratt Contemporary Graphic Arts Center in New York City. While enrolled in classes, he worked as a guard and custodian at the Corcoran Gallery of Art and as a night watchman at the Museum of Modern Art. In 1959, he received a John Hay Whitney Fellowship.

Although best known as an abstract painter, Tsuchidana made significant forays into printmaking and photography. He is best known for his drawings and prints in which the entire surface of the paper is covered with monochromatic lines of varying thicknesses, and for his Stage Series. Topographic Landscape is an example of the former. The Stage Series consists of paintings with a single horizontal line and varying numbers of vertical lines that connect the horizontal line with the top or bottom edge of the painting. Unlike his monochromatic drawings and prints, a myriad of color combinations have kept the artist occupied with this series, which is both geometric and minimalist, for over forty years. Untitled, Red and Gray from 1982 is an example of this series. The Free Library of Philadelphia, the Hawaii State Art Museum, the Honolulu Museum of Art, and the Museum of Friends (Walsenburg, Colorado) are among the public collections holding work by Harry Tsuchidana.

Tsuchidana died on October 20, 2026, at the age of 94.
