= Bumpei Akaji =

American sculptor (1921–2002)

- Cyparissus (1968), by Bumpei Akaji, copper and brass, Hawaii State Art Museum
- Born: 1921; Lawai, Kaui, Territory of Hawaii (now United States)
- Died: October 27, 2002 (aged 80–81); Honolulu, Oahu, Hawaii, United States
- Occupation: Sculptor

Bumpei Akaji (Japanese: 赤地 文平, January 30, 1921 – October 27, 2002) was an American Hawaiian sculptor of Japanese descent. He was known for welding large copper and brass sculptures which can be seen all over Hawaii as part of Hawaii's Art in Public Places program.

== Biography ==
Bumpei Akaji was born in 1921, in Lawai, on the Hawaiian island of Kauai, Territory of Hawaii. In 1943 he joined the United States Army and was sent to Italy with the 100th Battalion of the 442nd Regimental Combat Team.

He was inspired by the frescoes and mosaics he saw in Florence and Ravenna. After discharge from the army, he stayed in Italy to study at the Accademia di Belle Arti di Firenze in Florence and at the Brera Academy in Milan, on a Fulbright Scholarship. In 1950, he returned to Honolulu, and in 1951, was the first to receive a Master of Fine Arts in sculpture from the University of Hawaiʻi at Mānoa.

Akaji was a member of the Metcalf Chateau, a group of seven Asian-American artists with ties to Honolulu. In 1959 he created his first commission, which displayed at the Ala Moana Center.

Akaji learned welding from a local mechanic and is now best known for his large-scale welded copper and brass sculptures, which are both organic and abstract in nature, as typified by Cyparissus. The welded and/or pounded surfaces of his sculptures are often warm and sensual and over time develop a unique patina.

He died on October 27, 2002, in Honolulu at the age of 81.

== Works ==
The Hawaii State Art Museum and the Honolulu Museum of Art are among the public collections holding Akaji's work. Many of his works were commissioned by the state as part of Hawaii's Art in Public Places program, which designates 1% of construction funds in new public buildings to acquiring art. His sculptures in public places include:

- Untitled sculpture, Leilehua High School, Honolulu, Hawaii, 1976
- Na Mana Nu Oli, Bishop Trust Company, Honolulu, Hawaii, 1969
- Koaie, Anuenue Elementary School, Honolulu, Hawaii, 1972
- Nani Kauaʻi: Ke Mau Nei Ke Ea O Kauaʻi I Puhi Aina Malu (Beautiful Kauaʻi: The spirit of Kauaʻi thrives in the peaceful land of Puhi), Kauaʻi Community College, Lihue, Hawaii, 1977
- Untitled sculpture, Hana High and Elementary School, Hana, Hawaii, 1977
- Pule Oʻo, Molokai Public Library, Kaunakakai, Hawaii, 1973
- Reflections 1989, Kauai High School, Lihue, Hawaii, 1989
- Makaʻa eʻIke Aku i ke Awawa Uluwehi i na Kuahiwi o Manoa (Glowing Eyes Looking at the Lush Valley in the Mountains of Manoa, 1979) and VVV (1995), University of Hawaiʻi at Mānoa, Honolulu, Hawaii, 1995
- Moanalua, Moanalua High School, Honolulu, Hawaii, 1976
- Pupu Aʻo Ewa, Ewa Beach Community School, Honolulu, Hawaii, 1972
- Gushing Waters, Waipahu Elementary School, Honolulu, Hawaii, 1978
- Wilia i uka, wilia i kai, Pope Elementary School, Honolulu, Hawaii, 1977
- Hana Hihi-u O Na Makani Ika-ika O Hono Kaa, Honakaa School, Honokaa, Hawaii, 1975
- Hoʻolana, University of Hawaiʻi at Hilo, Hilo, Hawaii, 1984
- Maui Snares the Sun, Maui Memorial Hospital, Wailuku, Hawaii, 1981
- The Sun God, Wailuku State Office Building, Wailuku, Hawaii, 1970
- The Eternal Flame, Hawaii State Capitol Mall, Honolulu, Hawaii, 1974
- Birds Aloft, Ala Moana Center, Honolulu, Hawaii, 1966
- Wai Hoʻola a Lono, Koloa Public School & Library, Koloa, Hawaii, 1973
- Brothers in Valor Memorial, Fort DeRussy Military Reservation, Honolulu, Hawaii, 1996
- Untitled copper sculpture, President William McKinley High School, Honolulu, Hawaii, 1963
