= San Francisco Art Association =

Former American nonprofit organization

The San Francisco Art Association (SFAA) was an organization that promoted California artists, held art exhibitions, published a periodical, and established the first art school west of Chicago. The SFAA – which, by 1961, completed a long sequence of mission shifts and re-namings to become the San Francisco Art Institute – was the predecessor of the San Francisco Museum of Modern Art. Over its lifetime, the association helped establish a Northern California regional flavor of California Tonalism as differentiated from Southern California American Impressionism.

== Early history ==
SFAA was founded on March 28, 1871, by a group of some 23–30 artists, primarily landscape artists led by Virgil Macey Williams, with two goals: the forming of an art library, the promotion of art exhibitions, and the eventual establishment of an art school. Painter Juan B. Wandesforde hosted the organizational meeting and was elected its first president. Other early artist members included George Henry Burgess, Gideon Jacques Denny, Andrew P. Hill, Thomas Hill, William Keith, Arthur Nahl, Charles Christian Nahl and Ernest Narjot. The presence of painter-photographer George Henry Burgess among the founders connected the association with the nascent field of fine art photography.

Within a few months, SFAA had elected its first honorary member: Albert Bierstadt, the financially successful landscape painter from New York who was at that time sojourning in California. Bierstadt was also interested in stereoscopic photography. By 1874, SFAA had 700 regular members and 100 life members, the latter paying $100 for the privilege. The quarterly receptions were attracting some 1000 people and the semi-annual exhibitions, running for two months each, brought over 7000 viewers. In 1874, there were similar public art institutions in only three other United States cities: New York, Boston, and Washington, D.C.

From the beginning of the Bohemian Club in 1872, a web of interconnections between it and SFAA was apparent. Many artists were members of both organizations, and art patronage from well-to-do Bohemians helped provide a living for the all-male artists who were invited to join the Bohemian Club. SFAA exhibits in the late 19th century were very successful—many of the participating artists sold a year's worth of production to wealthy Bohemian and society patrons. By 1915, SFAA prosperity was intimately tied to Bohemian purchasing habits.

== School of art ==
In February 1874, SFAA founded the California School of Design, installing Virgil Macey Williams as director. Subsequent directors included: Emil Carlsen (1887–1889), Arthur Mathews (1890–1906), Robert Howe Fletcher (1907–1915), Pedro Joseph de Lemos (1914–1917), Lee Fritz Randolph (1917–1941), and William Alexander Gaw (1941–1945).

In 1893, the institution moved into the former Mark Hopkins mansion on Nob Hill, using the name Mark Hopkins Institute of Art (for the building but not the School of Design), and became affiliated with the University of California. In 1906, the devastating fire following the earthquake destroyed the building. A simpler replacement was built in one year, using the name San Francisco Institute of Art.

During his tenure as Director Pedro de Lemos, an award-winning printmaker, pastelist, and leader of the American Arts & Crafts Movement, created the Departments of Illustration as well as Decorative Design, and introduced the first courses in etching west of Chicago. He resigned after a long dispute with the Board of Directors, which rejected his recommendations for increased faculty salaries, student-teaching grants, building maintenance, and additional painting and life classes. He became the Director of the Stanford University Art Gallery and Museum. His replacement, the highly regarded artist Lee Randolph, is credited with reviving and enlarging the school. The school's name was changed to the California School of Fine Arts (CSFA). In 1926 it moved into a new building on Chestnut Street, still the main campus of the San Francisco Art Institute. In 1941 the celebrated modernist painter William Gaw proved an adept administrator who maintained enrollment by revising the curriculum during World War II. In the spring of 1945 Douglas MacAgy became the school's director.

== Museum of art ==
An art collection existed at the Mark Hopkins Institute of Art and could be visited by the public, but it did not take on the identity of a museum. Accounts differ regarding how much of the collection was saved from the 1906 fire. The Panama-Pacific International Exposition (PPIE) in 1915 increased local public interest in art and calls for San Francisco to have a permanent art museum. Afterward, the exposition organizers decided to give the Palace of Fine Arts to SFAA if $30,000 in operating expenses could be raised by May 1, 1916. In writing up the contract, the negotiating teams were each led by a Bohemian Club member: Charles Templeton Crocker represented SFAA, and his uncle William H. Crocker stood for the Panama-Pacific group. The building, intended only for temporary use, was deeded to SFAA and the land it was on, formerly part of the Presidio, was deeded to the City of San Francisco by an act of Congress, contingent on the federal government being granted the right to operate a spur railroad line from Fort Mason to the Presidio.

To direct the museum, the association hired J. Nilsen Laurvik, a New York art critic who had written a book on modern art in 1913 and co-edited the Catalogue de Luxe of the PPIE Department of Fine Arts. SFAA printed letterhead bearing the title "San Francisco Museum of Art" and in November 1916 began publishing the San Francisco Art Association Bulletin, intended as an annual journal. The Crockers formed committees within SFAA and filled the positions with successful businessmen. A shift in focus occurred in which traditional patronage practices came to the fore—the aesthetic wishes of the corporate class began to affect the artists' choices in subject matter and style. Against best intentions, attendance at the Palace of Fine Arts was too light to prevent heavy operating losses of $10,000–14,000 each year from 1915 to 1922, and the collection of public art remained small, overwhelmed by the vast space. Landscape painting, once the strength of SFAA fell off in volume. By the mid-1920s, only one modest landscape by reliably compliant Arthur Frank Mathews was being shown at the Palace.

SFAA promoted a series of civic bond issues in the mid-1920s, written to fund new museums. Work began on the Palace of the Legion of Honor, a favorite project of SFAA member Herbert Fleishhacker. Large murals began to appear in public spaces, painted by SFAA artists, and were favorably reviewed by art critics and the public alike. A combination of corporate class patronage, CSFA mural training and years of private experience came together to allow the mural artists to succeed. In 1924, the de Young Museum was voted a civic maintenance program, the Legion of Honor museum was finished, and in 1926, a bond was passed to reinforce the weakening Palace of Fine Arts structure. Three public museums were available to San Franciscans.

SFAA's own museum operated in the Palace of Fine Arts until 1925. After much fundraising and a bond measure, the San Francisco Museum of Art reopened in the War Memorial Veterans Building in the Civic Center in January 1935. The opening exhibitions included the SFAA Annual, Gothic and Renaissance tapestries from the collection of Mrs. William H. Crocker, 46 examples of "Modern French Painting" that included Cézannes and Renoirs, and Chinese sculpture which was "to remain at the museum as the nucleus of a permanent display of Oriental art." Albert M. Bender was a member of the board of trustees at the time and is said to have donated some 1100 of the first 1200 objects in the collection. The museum's governance was separate from that of SFAA, but a cooperative relationship between the two entities continued for years.

== Merger and dissolution ==
In 1961, SFAA merged with CSFA, and the art school took its modern name, the San Francisco Art Institute. The SFAA was officially dissolved in 1966.
