= Hassel Smith =

American painter

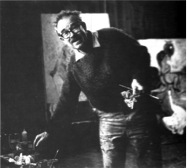
- Hassel Smith in his Sebastopol, Northern California studio, about 1964 (Photo: Bob Kalbaugh)
- Born: Hassell Wendell Smith Jr. 24 April 1915; Sturgis, Michigan, United States
- Died: 2 January 2007 (aged 91); Wiltshire, England
- Alma mater: California School of Fine Arts; Northwestern University
- Movement: Abstract expressionism, Figurative painting
- Spouse(s): June Myers (m. 1942–1958, her death), Donna Raffety Harrington (m. 1959–2007, his death)
- Children: 2 sons, including Bruce Smith, and 2 stepsons

Hassel Smith (24 April 1915 – 2 January 2007) was an American artist and teacher. He is considered to have been one of the USA's foremost West Coast artists, emerging in the decade after World War II as an innovative, potent, witty and often challenging exponent of Abstract Expressionism. He was a "generous and gregarious" teacher of great influence at the California School of Fine Arts in San Francisco and subsequently at the University of California and in later years at the Royal West of England Academy Art Schools in Bristol, England. His work was exhibited widely, particularly in California, and he is represented in prominent museums and found in private collections around the world. A strongly left-leaning iconoclast, well-known for a confrontational nature and as a drinker, he was at the same time loving, caring and shy. Art critics revered him as a "West Coast underground legend".

== Early life and education ==
Hassel Wendell Smith Jr. was born on 24 April 1915 in Sturgis, Michigan to Hassel Wendell Smith Sr., a sales and advertising executive for the Kirsch-Rod drapery hardware company, and Helen Adams Smith, both college graduates. During childhood, because of his mother's tuberculosis and the consequent search for a suitable climate for her health, Smith's family moved home regularly. When Smith was three they moved to Denver, Colorado where they stayed for two or three years, and then to Los Angeles briefly, before San Mateo and then quickly on to Mill Valley in California before returning to Michigan. They stayed in Michigan until 1930, when Smith was fifteen, before going back to San Mateo, where Smith attended San Mateo High School.

=== Student at Northwestern University ===
Smith went to Northwestern University in Evanston, Illinois, from 1932. He was initially a chemistry major but was defeated in learning German, then a requirement for a science career. He changed to art history and English literature, the art course requiring the practise as well as the study of art. He later claimed that at this point began "my actual art career, my love affair with painting". In 1936 Smith graduated B.S. cum laude with majors in history of art and English literature.

While in Chicago, Smith was excited by the Ballets Russes de Monte Carlo led by Léonide Massine on their visit to the city. "I had never seen anything like it," wrote Smith later, "and became a balletomane, missing no performances, entranced by the dancing, the music ... the marvellous costumes and scenery." More crucially, during 1932–34 he was exposed to paintings and sculptures exhibited at the World's Fair in Chicago. "The effect upon me of this experience was instantaneous and everlasting, a revelation", he wrote. "Lautrec, van Gogh, Gauguin, Seurat, Monet, Cézanne ... Miró, Brâncuşi, Léger, Duchamp, Matisse, Picasso, Mondrian, Dalí ... I was wowed by them all." His experiences in Chicago were turning points in his development.

=== Student at the California School of Fine Arts ===
In 1936 Smith won a scholarship to Princeton University for graduate studies in the history of art but after taking courses that summer at the California School of Fine Arts (CSFA) he decided not to take up his Princeton place but to continue studying at the CSFA despite finding it to be, in his words, "a debutante kind of place ... just crawling with socialites." There he studied under the artists Otis Oldfield, Spencer Macky, and Lee Randolph, and crucially he was also permitted to join the "elite" painting and drawing class of his mentor, Maurice Sterne, who exerted a considerable influence on him. Smith stated in 1987 in a brief memoir: "I have no hesitation in saying that to whatever extent my intellect has been engaged in the joys and mysteries of transferring visual observations in three dimensions into meaningful two-dimensional marks and shapes, I owe to Sterne." Smith maintained that Sterne "so aroused my interest in painting that I dropped my plans for study in history in favor of a professional career in painting."

== Career in painting ==
=== Post-graduate activity ===
On leaving the School of Fine Arts in the late 1930s Smith began to paint professionally, "largely under the spell of the post-Impressionists", working outdoors during both day and night in San Francisco and in the Bay Area. He and other artists with whom he was associated continued to attend night schools both at the CSFA and WPA art classes but they had few prospects of selling their paintings. Smith shared a "magnificent" studio at 727 Montgomery Street with a fellow artist from Sterne's class who he reckoned to be a "star performer", Jack Wilkinson. The studio had been a well-known location for artists since the late 1800s. Along with other San Francisco painters Smith showed and sold some of his work at the Iron Pot Restaurant at 639 Montgomery Street.

Short of money, Smith took paid work with the California State Relief Administration. After an in-service training course of only two weeks he found himself helping as a case worker with derelict and alcoholic men on the so-called Skid Row in the Tenderloin district of San Francisco. Coming from his "well-to-do" financial background he found the task "shattering". Partly as a result of this experience he became active in left-wing politics.

In October 1940, in reaction to World War II in Europe, the United States began the first peacetime conscription. It required the registration of all men between 21 and 35. Smith's number came up on the first day the draft was instituted. He registered as a conscientious objector but his physical examination classified him as 4-F, deeming him to be unfit for military service. As a result his conscientious objection petition was not ruled upon.

While working in the Tenderloin district, Smith continued to paint and in 1941 he held a group exhibition with Lloyd Wulf at the San Francisco Museum of Art. In the same year Smith won an Abraham Rosenberg Foundation Traveling Fellowship for independent study, worth $750. With this award (worth some $16,000 in 2025), Smith ceased working on skid row and with a fellow artist from the CSFA, Richard Hackett, moved to paint in the Mother lode region in the Sierra Nevada of California. There they stayed mostly in Angel's Camp, Columbia and Mokulumne Hill. Smith's work there until the end of 1941 was generally made en plein air (outdoors) painting landscapes, though here he also did his first figurative painting. "With Richard Hackett," Smith much later recalled, "I painted out of doors very much in the spirit of the great peasant painters, Van Gogh, Cézanne, Pissaro, and in a countryside very like in climate and appearance that of the South of France."

=== World War II ===
When the United States entered World War II in December 1941, Smith feared reclassification for military conscription so once again sought employment in socially significant work while keeping his draft board informed of his activity. He found a post with the Farm Security Administration (FSA) and was sent to the Arvin Migratory Labor Camp (made famous as "Weedpatch Camp" in the John Steinbeck novel The Grapes of Wrath) and other camps nearby in the Central Valley of California. The camps had been set up as government rescue centres for distressed, non-state resident migratory farm workers. There, while not on duty driving all over the region in his Ford Model A, distributing food stamps, he made powerful, rapid, documentary drawn portraits of the rural poor picking cotton and other crops. He later maintained that he had wanted to transmit as accurately as possible the actual conditions he had observed. Richard Cándida Smith in his 1995 study of Californian art, poetry, and politics writes that the people Smith "was employed to help were literally starving to death before his eyes in the richest agricultural region of the United States. He wanted to bring their situation to the attention of the world." The drawings were exhibited in five cities, reprinted in popular journals and newspapers and bought by the San Francisco Museum of Art for its permanent collection.

Having already become involved in left-wing politics, Smith's experiences in Arvin so altered his views on American society that he joined the Communist Party USA (CPUSA). The art historian Peter Selz has described him as "an intrepid member". In Arvin, too, Smith met June Dorothy Myers, a Home Management Supervisor for the migrant labour program, and they married in Pasadena, California in September 1942. Myers joined Smith as a member of the CPUSA.

In 1944 the FSA was phased out and Smith was transferred to the United States Forest Service to serve as a firefighter in Oregon but instead was almost immediately reassigned as a log scaler stationed in a small trailer at the head of the McKenzie River where he worked until the end of the war. Bruce Nixon in his 1997 essay on Smith observed that the experience of work in the labor camps, in the forests, and earlier on Skid Row, exerted a great "transformative" impact on Smith whose life up to that time had been shaped by "a secure, entirely sheltered, middle class existence". Smith maintained that "all of those experiences affected me a great deal".

=== Faculty of the California School of Fine Arts ===
In the summer of 1945, as the war ended, Smith gave up his community service and returned to the Bay Area. Almost immediately, a month after the Japanese surrender, he was given a five-week solo show at the Iron Pot Restaurant in North Beach where he exhibited some of his typical work of this time, such as semi-Surrealist images of American flags and Native American paraphernalia, and simultaneously found a post at the California School of Fine Arts assisting Ray Bertrand in the lithography workshop. The School at this time was in a state of transition after years of decline. Soon after Smith's arrival Douglas MacAgy became Director of the School and in a process of revitalisation invited Smith to remain on the staff as one of a distinguished group of instructors in the painting department, teaching drawing. The newly progressive faculty included Clyfford Still, Edward Corbett, David Park, Elmer Bischoff, Jean Varda, Walter Landor, Dorr Bothwell and Ansel Adams, among many other significant artists, filmmakers, photographers and designers. Mark Rothko and Ad Reinhardt also put in appearances as visiting instructors in summer courses. Students like Frank Lobdell and Richard Diebenkorn, just returned from the war and benefitting from the G.I. Bill, progressed to membership of the faculty during Smith's time at the School.

Smith said in a later interview about the 1945–1952 period at the CSFA that "it certainly was a very remarkable period for all of us... the experience was as much, or even more, a learning experience than a teaching one." Because of World War II and the subsequent G.I. Bill many of the students were the same age as the instructors. "The situation of being an instructor at the school at that time and/or being a student was virtually interchangeable" recalled Smith. "A lot of people got together and learned various things from each other." As well as Lobdell and Diebenkorn, among Smith's students at this time were Deborah Remington, Adelie Landis (later the wife of Elmer Bischoff), James Kelly and his later wife, Sonia Gechtoff, Lilly Fenichel, Roy De Forest, Ernest Briggs, John Hultberg, Julius Wasserstein, Jack Jefferson and Madeleine Dimond. Smith later described the student body as "quite a remarkable company".

In 1946 Smith became the first artist to work in a studio in the historic Audiffred Building (also known as 9 Mission Street) on the corner of The Embarcadero and Mission Street in San Francisco. Smith and – largely at his instigation – some fellow artists from the School, together with writers and musicians, occupied lofts both for studios and living quarters on the two upper floors of the building which otherwise was a club for homeless sailors. The artists had no electricity in their studios, and the poet and painter Lawrence Ferlinghetti, who took over Smith's studio when he left, describes there being no heat, either, except for a small pot-bellied stove. "It was a marvellous studio," Ferlinghetti wrote, "a big third-floor loft looking out on the Bay."

Also in 1946, during the summer break from the CFSA, Smith joined the artist Charles Surendorf in returning to Columbia to set up the Mother Lode Art School. It was not successful and soon petered out because of inadequate housing for students.

In May 1947 Douglas MacAgy's wife, Jermayne MacAgy, curated Smith's first major solo exhibition – Paintings – at the Palace of the Legion of Honor in San Francisco. Approximately 25 oil paintings were shown, all of them recent works. One reviewer considered the show "bounce[d] with vitality and good humour", but felt that Smith needed "to develop more fully his unquestioned, warm understanding of the people he paints." Smith's figurative painting, however, was soon to replaced by abstract images.

Since his student years Smith had painted mostly in a "figurative, Post-Impressionist" style but in July 1947 he was deeply influenced by an exhibition by Clyfford Still at the Palace of the Legion of Honor. This show of thirteen artworks was organised by Douglas MacAgy's wife and the CSFA faculty were able to view the paintings privately before the exhibition was open to the public. "It had a tremendous effect on me," recalled Smith. He returned several times to view the exhibition repeatedly and he later said his "conversion" to Abstract Expressionism had been "instantaneous" when he saw Still's work. He immediately began to develop what the San Francisco critic Thomas Albright described as "violently physical, improvisatory, jazz-related action painting ... rooted in certain aspects of Clyfford Still's abstraction, but ... recast as mercurial, exuberant, sometimes flamboyantly improvisational events".

As a result, amid the hotbed of postwar West Coast talent at the School of Arts, Smith "emerged as one of the leading abstract painters in the San Francisco Bay Area". The writer Bruce Nixon, in one of his biographical essays on Smith, claimed that the artist's work in the postwar decade revealed "an idiomatic stylist whose energy, insouciance, and lively intelligence very nearly encapsulate[d] the character of San Francisco painting in those years".

Smith's move into abstract impressionism caused a division into two groups within the faculty at the CSFA. Some, like Frank Lobdell and Ernest Briggs, were as deeply affected by Still's work as Smith was, whereas others like David Park, Elmer Bischoff, and Richard Diebenkorn, who had previously been abstract impressionist and were moving back into representational figurative painting, were not keen. "There was a good deal of discussion," Smith later remembered, "and some of it (was) quite acrimonious ... I think that we didn't mind yelling at each other a bit."

CSFA records show that Smith's classes at the school at this time had the highest enrolment. He taught most of the drawing courses. And as well as teaching at the CSFA, Smith also taught at a lot of the community centres in San Francisco, including the left-wing California Labor School, and at the African–American Booker T. Washington Community Center in San Francisco.

In 1948 Smith edited The Communist Manifesto in Pictures with an introduction by the State Chairman of the Communist Party of California. It was published by the International Book Store in San Francisco. Smith and six other artists contributed the lino block illustrations, all of which were available for sale in issues of 100 at $1 each. For his contribution Smith used the name "H Walter Smith".

The summer of 1948 saw Smith's canvases in a group exhibition entitled Elmer Bischoff, David Park, Hassell [sic] Smith at the San Francisco Museum of Modern Art. It had a large impact on Abstract Expressionism painting in and around San Francisco. One critic wrote of this show that "Smith leapt into the fray with a series of alarmingly tasteless abstractions ... the show caused a great commotion." Another critic described the art displayed by all three artists as "loud and smeary and meaningless." In Smith's work some maintained they saw "erotic imagery – phallus, breasts, and buttocks – in his shapes" though Smith insisted he never intentionally painted such things.

Taking leave of the CSFA later in 1948, Smith moved to Eugene, Oregon where he joined the faculty of the school of architecture and allied arts at the University of Oregon to teach painting and drawing. In November 1948 he staged a solo exhibition of recent paintings in the art school's gallery. Smith, however, found he disliked Oregon and considered the art faculty there to be too complacent, so he was there for only a year and in 1949, following an invitation from Douglas MacAgy, returned to the CSFA.

March 1950 saw a two-man exhibition, Paintings and Sculpture by Richard Diebenkorn and Hassel Smith at the Lucian Labaudt Art Gallery in Gough Street, San Francisco. Smith's sculpture was viewed with some contempt by one critic who described them as "concoctions of dismal old wood, dismembered cheap furniture parts, rusty wire, assorted old electric bulbs, etc." But another San Francisco newspaper critic found the paintings on show to have "communicated a fabulous richness and energy ... what they had to say was at least important and at best profound".

Smith resigned from the CFSA on 25 January 1952. There has always been speculation about the exact cause of his departure. He had joined the Communist Party USA when working for the Farm Security Administration during World War II and was also well-known for a confrontational nature. When Douglas MacAgy resigned from the CSFA in the spring of 1950 Ernest Mundt became Director in his place later that year. Mundt was out of sympathy with Smith's strong leftist politics and his style of teaching. He informed Smith that his contract would not be renewed. When the School announced its plans to fire Smith, Elmer Bischoff and David Park threatened to resign in protest. Smith then resigned pre-emptively rather than be fired ("It was a question of 'you can't fire me, I quit'," recalled Smith 26 years later.) and Bischoff and Park made good on their threat. Mundt later argued that "Hassel represented the kind of influence I appreciated least. He represented the least attractive side of the [Clifford] Still mystique."

Now lacking a regular income, Smith spent 1952 and some of 1953 teaching arts and crafts from kindergarten to the sixth grade at Presidio Hill School, an independent establishment which welcomed diversity in race, faith, nationality, and politics. He also taught at Mission Community Centre in Capp Street, San Francisco, and informally at his studio in the Audiffred Building. His home on Kansas Street, Potrero Hill became a popular social centre for friends and fellow artists.

In November 1952 Five Years of Painting and Sculpture by Smith was the inaugural exhibition at the short-lived but influential King Ubu Gallery in Fillmore Street, San Francisco. The Post Enquirer critic described it as "sensational".

=== Living in Sebastopol, California ===
In 1953 Smith and his wife and their five-year old son moved 55 miles north from San Francisco to the town of Sebastopol, Sonoma County in California. It was then still an apple-growing town and Smith took over a 10-acre working orchard on Hurlbut Avenue. At first, he had nowhere appropriate to paint, so while he worked the orchard he built himself a studio from redwood. He then started painting again and the orchard work was contracted out. The US art historian Susan Landauer has written that Smith "retreated from the trenches of San Francisco to the peaceful serenity ... of rural Sebastopol". She went on to say that here "he would create some of the most spectacular and unabashedly virtuosic canvases in the history of Abstract Expressionism." The critic Allan Temko hailed them as "thunderbolt" paintings. Smith later recorded that in Sebastopol he started to use what he called "curious decorators' colors for painting walls that have funny names. I remember that I started making some paintings with something known as 'Desert Sand'."

Smith's work began to be increasingly noticed. Sales improved and there were more exhibitions. In May 1955, along with 24 of his San Francisco students, and members of the CSFA faculty, he was part of the significant Action: Paintings, Collages, Lithographs; Contemporary Music of the West Coast, what Smith himself described as a "famous" exhibition staged in the Merry-Go-Round building on the Santa Monica Pier, California. This was the first time so many San Francisco painters had been seen together so extensively in Southern California. Later in 1955, in September, Smith showed in a solo exhibition at the East & West Gallery on Fillmore Street in San Francisco.

1957 saw the publication of On the Road, a semi-autobiographical novel by Jack Kerouac which sensationalised the art community of San Francisco. Smith never forgave Kerouac for using his given name (along with that of Elmer Bischoff) as the pseudonym "Elmer Hassel" for the real-life drug addict, thief and street hustler, Herbert Huncke.

Smith began to have regular showings at the "smart" new Dilexi Gallery in San Francisco from 1957 until the gallery's closure in 1969 and from 1958 to be exhibited in Los Angeles at the Ferus Gallery on La Cienega Boulevard to "immediate critical success". Ferus was to give him four solo exhibitions over the next five years. Smith's shows at Ferus ensured his singular influence over the painters of Southern California, and on artists along the entire West Coast of the United States. He became even more well known when he showed further afield in a sell-out exhibition at The New Arts gallery in Houston, Texas in 1959.

While continuing to live and work in Sebastopol, this was a time of increasing success and celebrity for Smith, but it was vitiated by the death of his wife, June, from cancer in August 1958. A year later, in 1959, he married Donna Raffety Harrington, aged 27 and of Berkeley, California. She was a divorced mother of two children. She and her boys had come with to live with Smith and his son in Sebastopol.

Smith's 1959 exhibition in Houston was seen by the London art dealer Charles Gimpel who purchased a large number of works from Smith's studio and invited him to show in a solo exhibition in April 1960 at the Gimpel Fils gallery, then in South Molton Street in London, England. This was Smith's first exhibition outside the United States. He was welcomed by the art critic of The Sunday Times of London as "an American of fine quality", and by The Times of London as "extremely accomplished". An untitled painting in this show was acquired for the Tate Gallery in London through the American Friends of the Tate.

After success in London and with the help of Gimpel, Smith was introduced to New York in February and March 1961 at the André Emmerich Gallery on East 64th Street, Manhattan. This was Smith's first show on the US East Coast and art critics nationally began to take a significant interest. "A savagery the more remarkable for being concocted with brilliance", maintained the New York Herald Tribune, and The New York Times declared it was "a pleasure to regard the deftness and dash of this virtuoso artist." Work from this exhibition sold steadily. Smith described the London and New York shows as "reasonably successful".

More exhibitions followed in 1961. Hassel Smith: A Selection of Paintings, 1948–1961 opened at the Pasadena Art Museum in California in March, curated by Walter Hopps. 31 works from the previous 13 years were on display, and a complimentary exhibition of earlier, representational, paintings opened simultaneously at the Ferus Gallery. Together they formed Smith's first retrospective. It met with considerable approval by critics. "Hassel Smith's exuberance is contagious and his skill and authority are evident," wrote Henry J Seldis in The Los Angeles Times. A new solo exhibition by Smith was staged later in 1961 at The New Arts in Houston.

Smith held a further exhibition of paintings at the Emmerich gallery in New York in March 1962 but the same New York Times critic who had discovered pleasure in Smith's show the year before found failings in the power of his paintings over the imagination. "Perhaps failure lies in the extreme incoherence of his compositions", wrote Stuart Preston.

=== Year in England ===
In 1962 Charles Gimpel suggested that Smith take his family – his wife Donna and now four sons – to England for a year and paint there. Gimpel promised that his gallery would exhibit his completed English canvasses. The Smiths agreed to the idea and left Sebastopol in the early summer of 1962. They settled for a year in the small village and fishing port of Mousehole in Cornwall in the far south west of England, the location chosen mainly because of its name. "We saw an advertisement for a house in this place called Mousehole, and we thought, 'My God! We've got to go there.'" Smith set up a studio for himself on the quay at the neighbouring fishing port of Newlyn two miles to the north. By now, Smith was beginning to return to figurative painting, but would continue to produce abstractions for a time.

While Smith was residing in England in 1962, an exhibition of his work was staged at the Galleriea dell'Ariete in Milan, Italy in November of that year and in March and April 1963 Gimpel Fils staged a second solo exhibition in London, this time showing work done in the previous few months in Cornwall. A few of Smith's new figurative works were featured. The art critic of The Times of London described the new paintings as "a striking combination of toughness and elegance", but The Observer's critic noted that in his view "A few forays into subject-painting show that the way back from abstraction is hard and long".

=== University of California, Berkeley and Los Angeles ===
At the end of summer 1963 the Smith family returned to California and the apple orchard at Sebastopol, and An Exhibition of Painting Done in Cornwall During a Year's Stay in England 1962–1963 appeared at the André Emmerich Gallery in New York.

Seeking teaching work, in September 1963 Smith joined the faculty of the University of California, Berkeley as a Lecturer in the Art Department. This was a non-tenure-track role, inevitable even in the mid-1960s for a former member of the Communist Party USA. He was regarded as a guest, which limited his job stability and opportunities. Nonetheless he stayed for the maximum two academic years, leaving in June 1965.

While thus employed Smith's work was shown in a retrospective in the Gallery Lounge of San Francisco State College, an exhibition described somewhat damningly by the artist John Coplans as "a kind of sampling, a loose survey of the artist's work over the past twenty years" but praised by the San Francisco Chronicle's critic, Alfred Frankenstein, as "an event of special interest and importance". Other solo exhibitions appeared in 1964 at the Worth Ryder Memorial Gallery in the University of California, Berkeley, where Smith showed figurative paintings carried out from 1960 to 1964, the David Stuart Gallery in Los Angeles (the first of four over the next ten years and welcomed as "outstanding" by the Los Angeles Times), and the University of Minnesota Art Gallery in Minneapolis. Smith yet again had a solo exhibition at the Dilexi Gallery, featuring figurative work.

Despite spending most of his professional career to this point amid the artists of Northern California, Smith in the mid-sixties found himself becoming more attracted to the artistic community associated with the Ferus Gallery in Los Angeles. His disappointment at his failure to establish himself on the faculty at Berkeley was another factor in a move with his family in the summer of 1965 from the Sebastopol orchard to Los Feliz in the Silverlake neighbourhood of Los Angeles. Smith joined the faculty of the University of California, Los Angeles (UCLA) in the position of Acting Associate Professor in the Art Department.

In Los Angeles Smith felt comfortable, made many artist friends, and when the Ferus Gallery closed he found himself a Southern California agent in David Stuart with whom he was to remain until 1978. He also loosened himself from his Bay Area past and started to produce what the critic Alan Temko has described as "remarkable ... unequalled figure paintings of contemporary Southern California: poolsides, empty streets, billboards, freeway overpasses, bubble cars, a bus of tourists, ladies in beehive hairdos, high heels, and funny underwear, with odd dogs ...". Another critic described some of these compositions as being "fraught with suggestive narrative".

Despite the lightness and humour of the work Smith was producing in Los Angeles, he was unhappy during his single academic year at UCLA where some of the faculty objected to his teaching methods and his hopes for a tenured position came to nothing. He was not invited to return for the next year.

== England ==
=== Teaching in England and California ===
In a well timed intervention in 1966 Paul Feiler, the head of painting at the Royal West of England Academy (RWA) Art Schools in Bristol, England, invited Smith to become Senior Lecturer in Painting at the college in a secure, tenured position. Smith's Los Angeles prospects did not look promising. Even though probably no longer a member of the Communist Party USA he was constantly under surveillance by the local police working under the instructions of the State of California, and by the Federal Bureau of Investigation who had visited Smith’s neighbours and instructed them to report what he and his family were doing. Despite the McCarthy Era hysteria having died down in most of the United States, California's investigations into Communists exceeded those of Joseph McCarthy throughout the 1960s, placing art and culture near the top of its list. As Susan Landauer has observed of Smith: "A single misstep might have led to his arrest". Smith's wife Donna reported that, particularly in the family's time at Sebastopol, the FBI would visit the house frequently to try to persuade Smith to identify Communist Party members. She said: "Hassel would repeat 'I have nothing say. I have nothing to say to you.' It did go on and on". Smith himself complained that the surveillance went on for nearly 20 years, beginning immediately after World War II until the move to England.

More positively, in the year in Mousehole in 1962–63, the Smiths had felt fully at home in Britain. Smith accepted the invitation immediately and the family moved permanently to England and away from the attentions of the FBI. In Britain Smith found himself "embraced as an eminent practitioner of the American style". He would return to California occasionally for guest teaching posts, major retrospective exhibitions, and some work in temporary studios but otherwise he remained in England until his death, thirty years later.

Smith remained full-time on the faculty at the RWA (which underwent various institutional name changes) until 1978, being promoted to Principal Lecturer in 1975, though he was granted leave of absence on a number of occasions in the 1970s to spend time in California as a guest teacher. For three months in 1973 and another three months in 1975 he was Visiting Professor in the Art Department at the University of California, Davis. In 1977–78 and again in 1979–80 he taught in the Art Department at the University of California, Berkeley, combining that with being a visiting Instructor at the San Francisco Art Institute (formerly the California School of Fine Arts) in San Francisco in the Summer Sessions of 1978 and 1979 and in the Fall Semester of 1979. He returned to the Institute as Guest Artist in March 1981.

In 1978 Smith resigned his full-time appointment in Bristol and until 1981, juggling his transatlantic responsibilities, he taught part-time in Bristol and at the Cardiff School of Art in Wales. He finally retired from teaching in 1981.

=== Later years ===
Smith maintained a studio at his home in Bristol and then from 1980 at his new home in a former rectory in the village of Rode, Somerset where he sold his stamp collection to finance the building of a studio. Most of Smith's work was still figurative at the time he moved to England and remained so for some years but from about 1970 he began to embrace abstraction again and in a formalised style. To achieve this, Smith established a 68-inch square canvas which he delineated and sub-divided systematically. When it came to rendering the painting he rejected the idea of inventing shapes and instead tautened his imaginative concepts by using only circles, triangles and rectangles. He worked in acrylic now instead of oil, mixing pigment in a liquid polymer to produce liberally his own colours, hues and concentrations, and in contrast to his signature free-wheeling "whip" hand (what the critic Allan Temko referred to as Smith's "witty line") he wielded compasses, rulers and T-squares. The results after several years of experimentation, which in some senses had observably begun towards the end of the years of figurative images, came to be known as The Measured Paintings.

While Smith's new work used geometric shapes, he refused to accept that the works were geometric. He likened them to "mapmaking and game boards, navigation and regulated play within demarcated boundaries". By 1977 he was maintaining that his work "could be closely related to the arts of music and dance as well as forms not commonly considered to be art: game boards, flags, maps, rugs, quilts, and so forth ..." Smith produced some 200 "measured" canvases over fifteen or so years. In the mid-1970s, when the measured paintings first began to be shown in California, "they met with uncertainty ..." Bruce Nixon observes, "or, at best, uneasy acceptance." They were considered challenging and were never greatly popular. For a long time there were no sales. But Smith recorded at the time that "I've never enjoyed painting as much as I have in the last few years because ... I feel more an artist than I ever have previously."

Despite living in England, Smith continued to exhibit in California. He showed regularly at the David Stuart Gallery until 1973 and then often at the Gallery Paula Anglim in San Francisco from 1977 to 1987. He had solo exhibitions at the Santa Barbara Museum of Art in 1968, the Tortue Gallery in Los Angeles (1980), the San Jose Museum of Art (1983), the John Berggruen Gallery in San Francisco (1985), and the Blum Helman Gallery, Santa Monica (1987).

By 1987 the precision of the measured paintings had progressed into the beginnings of urgent gesturalism. Smith found a new freedom. As one obituarist recalled: "the formality was abandoned, the palate widened, and the brush regained a flighty supremacy as Smith recaptured his wit and vividness". One critic described this new life in Smith's work as "an impulsive style of painting, vehement, expressive. The improvisations of a painter in love with jazz! Hassel Smith is a master of colour: the entire palette, luminous, wonderful contrasts." These paintings were more popular.

There were major retrospectives. Hassel Smith: Paintings, 1954–1975 was at the San Francisco Museum of Art in 1975. The show "recalls a golden age," enthused the art critic of the Oakland Tribune, but he was less enthusiastic about the latest paintings. "... it is difficult to follow Smith, who seems to be painting very much for himself." Hassel Smith: Selected Works, 1945–1981 appeared at the Oakland Museum in 1981. Again, critics balked at the measured paintings on show. " ... the paintings look bland," mourned The Berkeley Gazette but another critic found in the later paintings "very real elegance and balance and intelligence". There were 34 images on show. 1988 saw Hassel Smith: Selected Works, 1948–1963 at the Wiegand Art Gallery at the College of Notre Dame, Belmont and Hassel Smith: Measured and Figurative Paintings, 1964–1985 at the Monterey Museum of Art.

Solo exhibitions of Smith's latest work continued to appear in California as he moved into his mid-seventies and onwards towards his eighties: Gallery 44, Oakland (1988), the Iannetti Lanzone Gallery, San Francisco (1988), the Natsoulas-Novelozo Gallery and the John Natsoulas Gallery, Davis (1989 and 1991), Robert Aichele Fine Arts, San Francisco (1995), and the Mendenhall Gallery, Pasadena (1997). There were also a number of group exhibitions and solo shows in England and Germany.

In his late seventies, in about 1992, Smith noticeably started to develop Parkinsonism. Perhaps as a consequence, the brush began to quieten and produce larger spreads of colour often pierced with lightning flashes of brushwork and every so often the signature "whip" hand flourishes of the past are discernible. "In a creative Indian summer," wrote one of his obituarists, "Smith painted a body of organic, mysterious and colourful abstracts which are among his best and most appealing pictures". The art critic Robert C. Morgan has described these late period paintings as "something previously unseen in the history of American painting."

As Smith became progressively disabled he returned to drawing. "Beginning in about 1996", he recalled, "I began to draw again and in order to do this, to get myself to it after all those years, I set up a special place in my studio at the end of my table, where the materials were always available ... "

Smith ceased painting and drawing in 1998, at the age of 83. He lived for nine more years in increasing physical frailty, but his intellect and creativity remained. Visitors to his nursing home would report that they had watched him using a finger to draw in the air in front of him.

A retrospective was mounted in 2002-3, four years before Smith's death. Hassel Smith: 55 Years of Painting appeared at the Sonoma County Museum, Santa Rosa, California and later at the Laguna Art Museum, Laguna Beach, California.

Smith died in Sutton Veny, Wiltshire, England on 2 January 2007.

Smith's widow, Donna Raffety Smith, a family therapist, died on 12 August 2024.

Hassel and Donna Smith's son is Bruce Smith, the post-punk, alternative rock musician who was a drummer for The Pop Group, The Slits, the New Age Steppers and Public Image Ltd. He was formerly married to the Swedish singer Neneh Cherry.

A charitable organisation, the Hassel Smith Foundation, was set up in England and Wales in 2024 with the aim of establishing and maintaining a major collection of Smith's work to exhibit it in a wide range of galleries, museums and public collections, and to enable access to digital images and original work for research and educational purposes.

== Honours ==
In 1968 Smith received an award worth $5,000 from the National Endowment for the Arts, based in Washington DC, "For Distinguished Service to American Art".

In 1990 the Peter & Madeleine Martin Foundation for the Creative Arts presented their first "Distinguished Career Award", worth $20,000, to Smith, celebrating his "magnificent, intelligent, witty, and lyrical paintings and drawings", and his "brilliant and dynamic" career as a teacher.

In September 1991 the Art Commission of the City & County of San Francisco presented Smith with its Award of Honour for "Outstanding Achievement in Painting".

Also in 1991, the San Francisco Art Institute, formerly the California School of Fine Arts, conferred upon Smith the degree of "Honorary Doctorate of Fine Arts".

== Selected exhibitions, 1941–2003 ==
=== 1941 ===
- Paintings by Lloyd Wolf and Hassel Smith, San Francisco Museum of Art, San Francisco, California.

=== 1947 ===
- Paintings by Hassel Smith, California Palace of the Legion of Honor, San Francisco, California.

=== 1948 ===
- Paintings by Elmer Bischoff, David Park, and Hassel Smith, San Francisco Museum of Art, San Francisco, California.
- University of Oregon, Eugene, Oregon.

=== 1950 ===
- Hassel Smith and Richard Diebenkorn, The Lucian Labaudt Gallery, San Francisco, California.

=== 1951 ===
- Hassel Smith and Edward Corbett, California School of Fine Arts, San Francisco, California.
- Five Years of Painting and Sculpture, King Abu Gallery, San Francisco, California.

=== 1953 ===
- California Palace of the Legion of Honor, San Francisco, California.
- East & West Gallery, San Francisco, California.

=== 1955 ===
- Action: Paintings, Collages, Lithographs, Santa Monica Pier, Santa Monica, California
- East & West Gallery, San Francisco, California.

=== 1956 ===
- Ferus Gallery, Los Angeles, California.

=== 1957 ===
- California School of Fine Arts, San Francisco, California.

=== 1958 ===
- Ferus Gallery, Los Angeles, California.
- The New Arts, Houston, Texas.
- Dilexi Gallery, San Francisco, California.

=== 1959 ===
- Ferus Gallery, Los Angeles, California.
- California School of Fine Arts, San Francisco, California.
- The New Arts, Houston, Texas.

=== 1960 ===
- Gimpel Fils, London, England.

=== 1961 ===
- André Emmerich Gallery, New York, New York.
- Ferus Gallery, Los Angeles, California.
- Hassel Smith: A Selection of Paintings – 1948–1961, Norton Simon Museum, Pasadena, California.

=== 1962 ===
- Ferus Gallery, Los Angeles, California.
- Dilexi Gallery, San Francisco, California.
- André Emmerich Gallery, New York, New York.
- Galleriea dell'Ariete, Milan, Italy.
- University Gallery, Northrup Auditorium, University of Minnesota, Minneapolis.

=== 1963 ===
- Gimpel Fils, London, England.
- André Emmerich Gallery, New York City.

=== 1964 ===
- Dilexi Gallery, San Francisco, California.
- Hassel Smith: Twenty Years, Gallery Lounge, San Francisco State University, San Francisco, California.
- Worth Ryder Gallery, University of California, Berkeley, California.

=== 1965 ===
- Dilexi Gallery, San Francisco, California.
- David Stuart Gallery, Los Angeles, California.

=== 1966 ===
- David Stuart Gallery, Los Angeles, California.

=== 1968 ===
- David Stuart Gallery, Los Angeles, California.
- Santa Barbara Museum of Art, Santa Barbara, California.

=== 1969 ===
- David Stuart Gallery, Los Angeles, California.

=== 1972 ===
- Bristol Museum and Art Gallery, Bristol, England.

=== 1973 ===
- David Stuart Gallery, Los Angeles, California.

=== 1974 ===
- Hassel Smith in Houston, Blaffer Art Museum, University of Houston, Houston, Texas.

=== 1975 ===
- Hassel Smith Paintings: 1954–1975, San Francisco Museum of Art, San Francisco, California.

=== 1977 ===
- Gallery Paule Anglim, San Francisco, California.

=== 1978 ===
- Recent Paintings, Arco Centre for Visual Art, Los Angeles, California
- Gallery Paule Anglim, San Francisco, California.

=== 1979 ===
- Gallery Paule Anglim, San Francisco, California.

=== 1980 ===
- Tortue Gallery, Los Angeles, California.
- Gallery Paule Anglim, San Francisco, California.

=== 1981 ===
- Hassel Smith: Selected Works, 1945–1981, Oakland Museum, Oakland, California.

=== 1982 ===
- Hassel Smith: Works on Paper, Gallery Paule Anglim, San Francisco, California.
- Hassel Smith: Figurative Paintings, Gallery Paule Anglim, San Francisco, California.

=== 1983 ===
- San Jose Museum of Art, San Jose, California.

=== 1984 ===
- Gallery Paule Anglim, San Francisco, California.
- Theatre of the Primitive Future, London, England.

=== 1985 ===
- John Berggruen Gallery, San Francisco, California.

=== 1987 ===
- Hassel Smith – Charles Strong: Monotypes, Smith-Anderson Gallery, Palo Alto, California.
- Blume Helman Gallery, Santa Monica, California.
- Gallery Paule Anglim, San Francisco, California.

=== 1988 ===
- Hassel Smith Recent Paintings, 1986–1987, Gallery 44, Oakland, California.
- Hassel Smith Selected Works, 1948–1963, Wiegand Art Gallery, Notre Dame de Namur University, Belmont, California.
- Hassel Smith Measured and Figurative Paintings, 1964–1985, Monterey Museum of Art, California.
- Cleveland Bridge Gallery, Bath, England.
- Ianetti Lanzone Gallery, San Francisco, California.

=== 1989 ===
- King Abu Retrospective, Natsoulas-Novelozo Gallery, Davis, California.

=== 1991 ===
- Six Gallery Lyrical Vision, John Natsoulas Gallery, Davis California.
- The Bristol Group, Bristol Arts Gallery, Bristol, England.

=== 1995 ===
- Robert Aichele Fine Arts, San Francisco, California.
- Studio Gallery, London, England.

=== 1996 ===
- Thornton Bevan Fine Arts, London, England.
- The San Francisco School of Abstract Expressionism, San Francisco Museum of Modern Art, San Francisco, California.

=== 1997 ===
- John Natsoulas Gallery, Davis, California.
- Mendenhall Gallery, Pasadena, California.

=== 2002 ===
- Hassel Smith: 55 Years of Painting, Sonoma County Museum, Santa Rosa, California.

=== 2003 ===
- Hassel Smith: 55 Years of Painting, Laguna Art Museum, Laguna Beach, California.

== Significant public collections ==
- Buffalo AKG Art Museum, Buffalo, New York
- Hirshhorn Museum and Sculpture Garden, Smithsonian Art Institution, Washington, DC
- Norton Simon Museum, Pasadena, California
- Oakland Museum of California, Oakland, California
- Phoenix Art Museum, Phoenix, Arizona,
- San Francisco Museum of Modern Art, San Francisco, California
- San Jose Museum of Art, San Jose, California
- Smithsonian American Art Museum, Washington, DC
- Tate, London, England
- Whitney Museum of American Art, New York City
