= Anna Weinberg =

Anna Weinberg may refer to:

- Anna Weinberg (psychologist)
- Anna Weinberg (restaurateur)
