= Nancy Oakes =

American chef

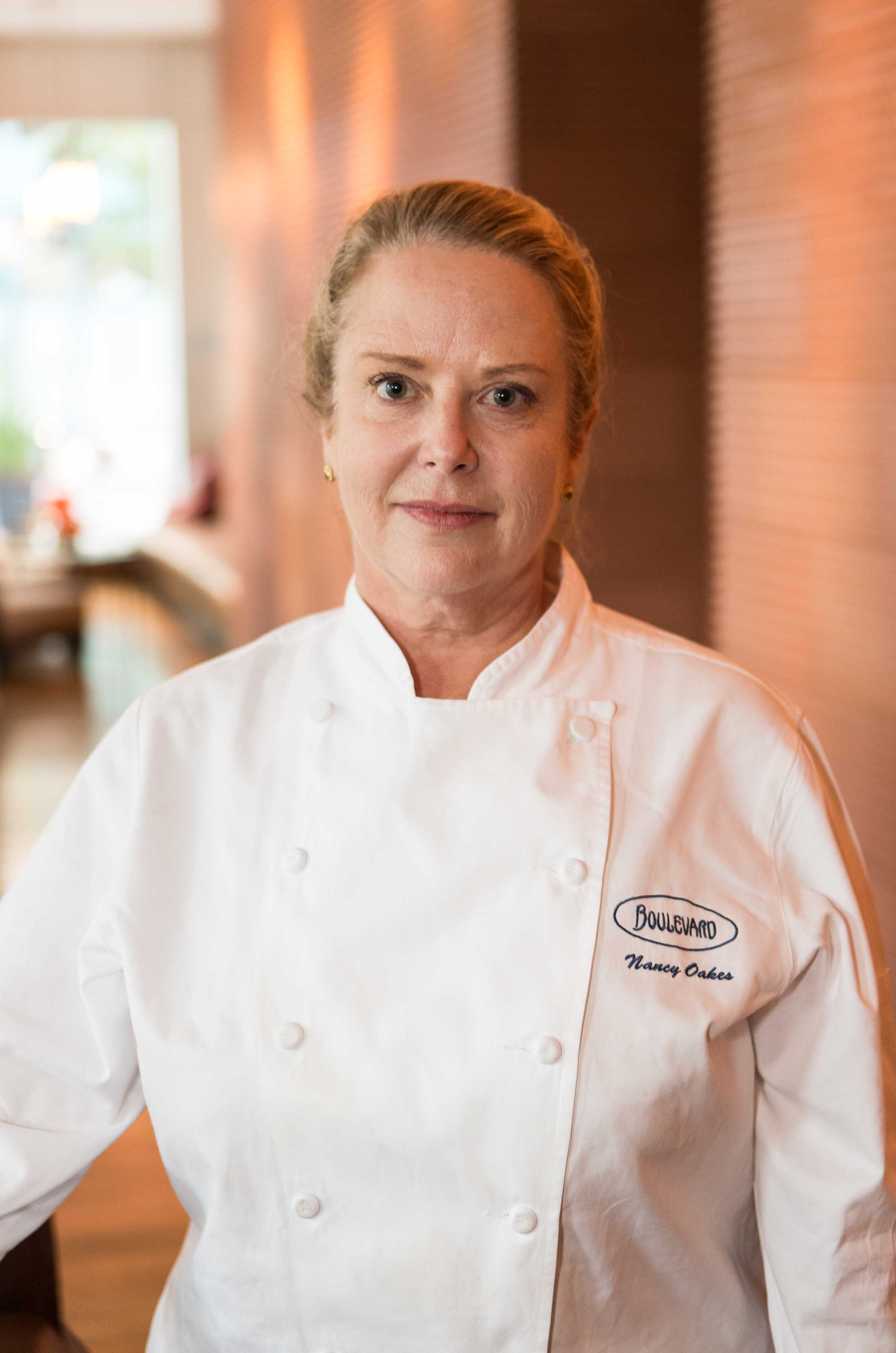
- Oakes in 2012
- Spouse: Bruce Aidells
- Culinary career
- Cooking style: New American cuisine
- Current restaurants
- Boulevard; Prospect; https://prospectsf.com/
- Previous restaurant
- L'Avenue
- Award
- James Beard Foundation Award for Outstanding Chef 2001

Nancy Oakes is an American chef, who is head chef of Boulevard, and won the James Beard Foundation Award for Outstanding Chef in 2001.

== Career ==
The culinary career of Nancy Oakes began under Pat O'Shea at the Mad Hatter restaurant in the Richmond District of San Francisco. She left that restaurant to open a location on her own, with L'Avenue opening in 1988. Although the restaurant closed in 1993, the San Francisco Chronicle's website "SFGate" highlighted Oakes' work at L'Avenue as being one of five trendsetting restaurants which changed the culinary scene in the city.

When L'Avenue was closed, Oakes opened her second restaurant, Boulevard. It is located in one of two buildings on the waterfront that survived the 1906 San Francisco earthquake. Oakes has continued to work in the kitchen there ever since, although she takes an interest in her third restaurant, Prospect. With the exception of 1996, Oakes was nominated consecutively for the James Beard Foundation Award for Outstanding Chef from 1995 to 2000, winning the award in 2001. Likewise, Boulevard was nominated on eight consecutive occasions for the Best Restaurant Award, before finally winning in 2012. She said that over the time she has spent at the restaurant, it was evolved from a neighborhood restaurant into something that people view as a destination restaurant.

With Anna Weinberg and Ken Fulk, she opened Tosca Cafe in 2021.

== Personal life ==
Oakes is married to Bruce Aidells, founder of Aidells sausage company and a cook book author.
