= Susan Landauer =

American art historian and curator (1958–2020)

- Born: 1958; Oakland, California, U.S.
- Died: 2020 (aged 61–62); Oakland, California, U.S.
- Education: Yale University, University of California Berkeley
- Known for: Contemporary and modern art curation, art historical writing, museum leadership
- Awards: International Association of Art Critics, National Endowment for the Arts, Henry Luce Foundation, College Art Association

Susan Landauer (1958–2020) was an American art historian, author, and curator of modern and contemporary art based in California. She worked for three decades, both independently and as chief curator of the San Jose Museum of Art (SJMA) and co-founder of the San Francisco Center for the Book. Landauer was known for championing movements and idioms of California art, overlooked artists of the past, women artists, and artists of color. She organized exhibitions that gained national attention; among the best known are: "The San Francisco School of Abstract Expressionism" (Laguna Art Museum, San Francisco Museum of Modern Art, 1996), "Visual Politics: The Art of Engagement" (SJMA, 2006), and retrospectives of Elmer Bischoff, Roy De Forest (both at the Oakland Museum of California, 2001 and 2017, respectively), and Franklin Williams (2017, Museum of Sonoma County). Her work was recognized with awards and grants from the International Association of Art Critics, National Endowment for the Arts and Henry Luce Foundation, among others. Critics, including Roberta Smith and Christopher Knight, praised her scholarship on San Francisco Abstract Expressionism, De Forest, Richard Diebenkorn, and Bernice Bing, among others, as pioneering. In 2021, Art in America editor and curator Michael Duncan said that "no other scholar has contributed as much to the study of California art". Landauer died of lung cancer at age 62 in Oakland on December 19, 2020.

== Early life and career ==
Landauer was born Susan Elise Klein in 1958 in Oakland, California. She grew up in Berkeley, four blocks from the University of California, Berkeley campus, where her mother, Barbara, studied art in preparation to becoming an interior designer. Her mother's friends and acquaintances included bohemians and Beat-era artists such as poet Lawrence Ferlinghetti, affiliations that Landauer would herself cultivate throughout her life. As a child, she was bused to Martin Luther King Jr. Middle School in the first year of court-ordered desegregation, attended Berkeley High School, and later graduated from University of California, Berkeley with an art history degree with an emphasis on Chinese and Japanese art in 1982.

She enrolled in graduate studies at Yale University (MA, 1984; PhD, 1992), shifting focus to American art. Her dissertation centered on mid-century San Francisco abstract expressionism, a topic that was initially controversial in her department, which questioned whether it merited rigorous investigation; after successfully defending her subject, she would convert the dissertation into her first book, The San Francisco School of Abstract Expressionism (1996). While at Yale, she met her husband, Carl Landauer, who was also studying for a PhD. They married in 1986 and moved to Oakland in 1991.

During the 1990s, Landauer independently organized exhibitions in Los Angeles and Bay Area institutions including the Richmond Art Center, McPherson Center for Art and History, Autry Museum of the American West, and Laguna Art Museum. In 1996, she was hired as an assistant curator of American Art at the Los Angeles County Museum of Art and became a co-founder at the San Francisco Center for the Book, serving in that capacity until 1999. In 1999 she was named chief curator at the San Jose Museum of Art, where she remained until 2009.

== Work ==
Landauer's scholarship and curatorial work was fueled by a strong connection to California and, especially, Bay Area movements (Abstract Expressionism, Beat art, the eccentric Funk Art scene) and a passion for championing "underdog" or overlooked artists. Her exhibitions and writing often juxtaposed famous and lesser-known artists, establishing dialogues, interrelationships, and insights that served as correctives to dominant art historical narratives that left out significant figures, social groups, and regions.

=== Independent curating and scholarship (1990–2001) ===
In her first decade, Landauer's curating and writing focused on diverse, under-recognized California artists and movements, from early and mid-century modernism to psychedelia to contemporary work. Early exhibitions included "Edward Corbett: A Retrospective" (Richmond Art Center, Laguna Art Museum, 1991), which reintroduced audiences to a onetime Bay Area Abstract Expressionist luminary, and "Paper Trails: San Francisco Abstract Expressionist Prints, Drawings, and Watercolors," the inaugural exhibition at the Santa Cruz Museum of Art and History (1993). In 1995, she co-curated "Independent Spirits: Women Painters of the American West, 1890–1945" at the Autry Museum, contributing an essay on women artists of Northern California to the show's companion book.

She gained widespread attention for "The San Francisco School of Abstract Expressionism" (Laguna Art Museum, SFMOMA; 1996), which was based on her Yale dissertation and won a regional museum show award from the International Art Critics Association. Los Angeles Times critic Christopher Knight called the exhibition catalogue a "little bombshell" that "demolished for good the old canard that Abstract Expressionism began in New York and radiated outward across the country". The first comprehensive museum survey of Bay Area Abstract Expressionism, it assembled paintings by Ronald Bladen, Corbett, Jay DeFeo, Diebenkorn, Sam Francis, Sonia Gechtoff, Hassel Smith, Clyfford Still, and others, arguing that artists centered at the old California School of Fine Arts (renamed the San Francisco Art Institute) were hybridizing abstraction, Surrealism, and Expressionism simultaneously with others all across the country rather than responding to developments in the artistic center. Artforum's Peter Plagens described the show as beautiful and concise, while noting as "discoveries" artists such as Walter Kuhlman, Frank Lobdell, and Charles Strong.

In the retrospective "Grand Lyricist: The Art of Elmer Bischoff" (Oakland Museum, 2001–2), Landauer traced the painter's history through 70 canvases (many seldom-seen), from 1940s Abstract Expressionism to hotly colored 1950s figurative scenes to more complex, frenetic 1970s abstraction. Her accompanying book, Elmer Bischoff: The Ethics of Paint, characterized him as the "romantic" of Bay Area painters, detailing his lyrically improvisational paint handling (described as "liquid light"), sensuous color, connection to the region and jazz music, and willingness to take risks in order to remain true to himself.

In the latter 1990s, Landauer organized shows at the intersection of fine arts and book arts for the San Francisco Center for the Book. These included "The Pages of Sin: Beat-Era Book Arts, Ephemera, and Portraits by Harry Redl" (1996), "Flashback: A Psychedelic Exhibition" (1997) and "Breaking Type: The Art of Karl Kasten" (1999). "Pages of Sin" highlighted the work of the lesser-known Venice Beach scene artists, as well as others, such as William Everson, Bern Porter, and Kenneth Patchen; "Flashback" centered on book art, posters, paintings, and ephemera (e.g., printed LSD blotter paper) inspired by rock music and hallucinatory drugs in conjunction with the 30th anniversary of the Summer of Love and included work by Bay Area-based designers Rick Griffin, Victor Moscoso, and Wes Wilson.

=== San Jose Museum of Art (1999-2009) ===
As the Katie and Drew Gibson Chief Curator at the relatively young San Jose Museum of Art (SJMA), Landauer was given license to organize creative exhibitions, including "random encounters" with interspersed emerging-artist work, as well as historical and themed shows. She continued to champion California work, while widening her scope to include underrepresented groups, idioms, and riskier sociopolitical themes, which in part reflected the community's entrepreneurial spirit, independent thought, and openness. She also enhanced the museum's art collection, particularly of works by California artists, some of which was documented in the book, Selections: The San Jose Museum of Art Permanent Collection (2004).

Her inaugural exhibition, "The Lighter Side of Bay Area Figuration" (2000, co-presented by the Kemper Museum of Contemporary Art), explored humor in post-World War II, Northern-California art. It featured works from Funk artists Robert Arneson and William T. Wiley and satirists Robert Colescott and M. Louise Stanley, among others, highlighting the region's freedom from New York critical orthodoxy. "The Not-So-Still Life" (co-curated, 2003) drew broadly—from early 20th century Impressionist floral studies to a 2001 video installation—to argue that Californians took a lead in reviving the venerable convention of the still life. Circling in time, the show presented an evolving dialogue of diverse artists (e.g., Edward Kienholz, Peter Saul, Robert Therrien, Wayne Thiebaud), ideas, and traditions. Other region-related exhibitions included solo shows of miniature painter Robert Schwartz (2004), Hassel Smith ("Line on the Loose: A Memorial Exhibition," 2008), and collagist Wilfried Sätty (2009).

Landauer organized several shows exploring Latinx themes and artists, such as "Contemporary Devotion" (2001), which paired well-known and emerging artists working in a magic realist vein influenced by the Mexican retablo tradition (e.g., Manuel Ocampo, Elizabeth Gomez, Tino Rodríguez); it was presented in conjunction with a traveling show of retablos from the New Mexico State University collection. She also curated Rodríguez's first solo exhibition (2003) and one for Mexican photographer Manuel Álvarez Bravo (2003).

Two exhibitions (and accompanying catalogues) focused on the edgy, contemporary work of Los Angeles's underground Lowbrow art movement, which combines pop-culture iconography, surrealism, and social commentary: "Tragic Kingdom: The Art of Camille Rose Garcia" (2007) and "Todd Schorr: American Surreal" (2009). Two themed group exhibitions were more overtly political: "Disarming Parables" featured works commenting on war on the eve of the U.S. Gulf War, while "Visual Politics: The Art of Engagement" (2006) offered a wide-ranging survey of West Coast art that Landauer described as "breathing new life into the iconography of protest." The latter show was accompanied by a book by Peter Selz to which Landauer contributed the essay, "Countering Cultures: The California Context."

=== Independent curating and writing (2002–21) ===
Much of Landauer's later writing focused on under-appreciated women artists, including catalogue essays for the exhibitions "The Dual Worlds of Bernice Bing" (Sonoma Valley Museum of Art, 2019) and "Women of Abstract Expressionism" (Denver Art Museum, 2016), and the catalogue, Her View: The Bay Area Figuration of Gail Chadell Nanao (2018, Sonoma Valley Museum of Art). She also contributed essays to catalogues on Richard Diebenkorn, Guy Diehl, and John Paul Jones, among others.

Her major curated exhibitions after leaving SJMA include the retrospective "Of Dogs and Other People: The Art of Roy De Forest" (OCMA, 2017), "Eye Fruit: The Art of Franklin Williams" (Art Museum of Sonoma County, 2017), and "Painting the Face of Infinity: Matthew Barnes and the World of Night" (Oceanside Museum of Art, Monterey Museum of Art, 2019). The De Forest show took on an under-recognized contrarian from the funk milieu of the late 1950s who Landauer appreciated since childhood and set out to vindicate. Roberta Smith described its catalogue as a "vivid, informed account" detailing his sophistication and wide-ranging knowledge of art history and native cultures. "Eye Fruit" offered the first retrospective on Williams's career, introducing the art world to a Bay Area artist often deemed unclassifiable; Hyperallergic described him as "the very distillation of authentic self-expression" and named the show one of its "Best of 2017."

== Major publications ==
=== Books and catalogues ===
- Of Dogs and Other People: The Art of Roy De Forest, Oakland/Berkeley, CA: Oakland Museum of California/University of California Press, 2017.
- Eye Fruit: The Art of Franklin Williams, Santa Rosa, CA: Art Museum of Sonoma County, 2017.
- (with Petra Giloy-Hirtz and Paul J. Karlstrom). Hassel Smith: Paintings, 1937-1997, Munich/New York: Prestel Verlag/Random House, 2011.
- (with Sarah Bancroft and Peter Levitt). Richard Diebenkorn: The Ocean Park Series, Munich/Newport Beach, CA: Prestel Verlag/Orange County Museum of Art, 2011.
- (with Mike McGee). John Paul Jones: The Pursuit of Beauty's Perfect Proof, Fullerton, CA: California State University Fullerton, 2009.
- (with William Gerdts and Patricia Trenton). The Not-So-Still Life: A Century of California Painting and Sculpture, Berkeley/San Jose, CA: University of California Press/San Jose Museum of Art, 2003.
- Elmer Bischoff: The Ethics of Paint, Berkeley/Oakland, CA: University of California Press/Oakland Museum, 2001.
- The Lighter Side of Bay Area Figuration, Kansas City, MO/San Jose, CA: Kemper Museum of Contemporary Art/San Jose Museum of Art, 2000.
- The San Francisco School of Abstract Expressionism, Berkeley/Laguna Beach, CA: University of California Press/Laguna Art Museum, 1996.
- California Impressionists, Athens, GA: University of Georgia Press/Atlanta Committee for the Olympic Games, 1996.
- Paper Trails: San Francisco Abstract Expressionist Prints, Drawings, and Watercolors, Santa Cruz, CA: Santa Cruz Museum of Art and History, 1993.
- (with Janice T. Driesbach). Obata's Yosemite: The Art and Letters of Chiura Obata from his Trip to the High Sierra in 1927, Yosemite National Park: Yosemite Association, 1993.
- Edward Corbett: A Retrospective, Richmond, CA: Richmond Art Center, 1990.

=== Essays ===
- "The Dual Worlds of Bernice Bing," in Bingo: The Life and Art of Bernice Bing, by Jennifer Banta, Linda Keaton and Susan Landauer, Sonoma, CA: Sonoma Valley Museum of Art, 2019.
- "The Advantages of Obscurity: Women Abstract Expressionists in San Francisco," in Women of Abstract Expressionism, Joan Marter (ed.), New Haven, CT/Denver, CO: Yale University Press/Denver Art Museum, 2016.
- (with Carl Landauer). "Open Eye, Open Palette: The Art of Lawrence Ferlinghetti," Confrontation, Spring 2015.
- "Countering Cultures: The California Context," in Art of Engagement: Visual Politics in California and Beyond, Peter Selz (ed.), Berkeley/San Jose, CA: University of California Press/San Jose Museum of Art, 2005.
- "Painting Under the Shadow: California Modernism and the Second World War," in On the Edge of America: California Modernist Art, 1900-1950, Paul Karlstrom (ed.), Berkeley, CA: University of California Press with Fine Arts Museums of San Francisco and Smithsonian Institution, 1996.
- "Clyfford Still and Abstract Expressionism in San Francisco," in Clyfford Still: The Buffalo and San Francisco Collections, Thomas Kellein (ed.), Munich: Prestel Verlag, 1992.
