= Madeleine Dimond =

American artist

- Born: Madeleine Violett; October 8, 1922; New York, New York
- Died: December 1, 1991 (aged 69); San Francisco, California
- Other name: Madeleine Dimond Martin
- Known for: Painter
- Movement: Abstract expressionism
- Spouse: Peter Martin

Madeleine Dimond (1922–1991) was an American Abstract expressionist painter.

Dimond was born on October 8, 1922, in New York City. She studied briefly at the Art Students League of New York. She served in the WAVES (Women Accepted for Volunteer Emergency Service) during World War II. She settled in San Francisco and attended the California School of Fine Arts under the G.I. Bill. Her teachers included Edward Corbett and Hassel Smith.

Through the 1950s Dimond had a studio on Mission Street as did fellow abstract expressionist painters Joan Brown and Sonia Gechtoff. She was involved with cooperative galleries around San Francisco including the Six Gallery and its predecessor the King Ubu Gallery. Her work was included in the 1954 exhibition "From San Francisco: A New Language of Painting" held at the Kauffman Gallery in New York City.

Dimond relocated to New York in the 1960s with her third husband Peter D. Martin (1923–1988). The couple founded the New Yorker Bookstore located on West 89th Street. The bookstore was in existence from 1965 to 1982.

Dimond returned to San Francisco after Martin's death. In 1988 she co-founded the Peter and Madeleine Martin Foundation for the Creative Arts.

Dimond died on December 1, 1991, in San Francisco, California.

In 2023 her work was included in the exhibition Vision Become: The Artists of the Six Gallery, San Francisco 1954–1957 at the Modern Art West.
