= Howard Hack =

American painter (1932–2015)

Howard Edwin Hack
- Howard Hack in his Oakland studio (2013)
- Born: July 6, 1932 (age 94); Cheyenne, Wyoming, U.S.
- Died: June 11, 2015 (aged 82); Oakland, California, U.S.
- Education: California College of Arts and Crafts; San Francisco Art Institute; Mills College
- Known for: Representational painter and graphic artist

Howard Edwin Hack (July 6, 1932 – June 11, 2015) was an American representational painter and graphic artist, with works in numerous museum collections. Known for an innovative approach to a variety of media, as well as use of traditional oil paints, Hack began working in the late 1940s. He was active in the San Francisco Bay Area.

== Early life and education ==
Hack was born July 6, 1932, in Cheyenne, Wyoming, and moved with his family to Oakland, California, in 1939. As a youth, Hack established himself among San Francisco’s North Beach artists, exhibiting paintings at Vesuvio Cafe and The Coffee Gallery.

Between 1950 until 1953, Hack learned Flemish painting techniques from Martin Baer, who had studied in Munich and Paris. Hack attended California College of Arts and Crafts and the San Francisco Art Institute in this period, as well as studying with Yasuo Kuniyoshi at Mills College in the summer of 1949. In 1953, Hack was drafted into the United States Army and assigned to Korea where he served as a truck driver and battalion clerk-typist (S-1).

== Career ==
Upon returning to the United States, Hack resumed painting, using images from his stay in Korea, and scenes from Oakland. Hack occupied studio space and lived in the Ghost House (a victorian house located at Franklin Street at Sutter Street in San Francisco), along with other artists, including Wally Hedrick, Jay DeFeo, and Hayward Ellis King. From the Ghost House, Hack attended the gathering at the nearby Six Gallery (the Six Gallery Reading at 3119 Fillmore Street, San Francisco), where poet Alan Ginsberg debuted his poem Howl on October 7, 1955.

Between 1957 and 1959, Hack lived primarily in San Miguel de Allende, in the central Mexican state of Guanajuato, a haven adopted by American artists and bohemians after World War II. In 1959, Hack returned to the United States, enrolling as a philosophy undergraduate at the University of San Francisco (USF). At USF Hack studied the theories of the neo-Kantian idealist philosopher Ernst Cassirer (1874–1945), in particular his concepts of symbolism.

=== Audiffred Building ===
In 1959, after a referral by Beat poet and bookstore owner Lawrence Ferlinghetti, Hack rented studio space with other artists on the third floor of the Audiffred Building located at 9 Mission Street in San Francisco. The artists included Frank Lobdell, Hassel Smith, Sonia Gechtoff, Madeline Dimond, Philip Roeber, Manuel Neri, and Joan Brown. Despite eviction efforts mounted in 1971, Hack alone used this studio space until 1978, completing some of his most notable oil paintings and silverpoints.

In 2013, Hack donated the door from his Audiffred studio (salvaged in 1978), signed by artists who had worked on the premises, to the Beat Museum in San Francisco’s North Beach.

=== Major exhibitions ===
"Window Series #21," 1967, F. Uri & Co., San Francisco MOMA Collection

In 1967, the M.H. De Young Museum, San Francisco, exhibited Hack’s “Window Series,” oil paintings depicting scenes from San Francisco’s South of Market area designated for demolition. In his review of the show San Francisco Chronicle art critic Alfred Frankenstein referred to the works as “magic realism,” a phrase coined in 1943 by Alfred H. Barr Jr., founding director of the New York Museum of Modern Art. (In her “Foreword and Acknowledgment” to the MoMA catalog for the exhibition Realists and Magic Realism, Dorothy Canning Miller referred to Barr’s definition of magic realism as “a term sometimes applied to painters who by means of an exact realistic technique try to make plausible and convincing their improbable dreamlike or fantastic visions.”) Frankenstein noted: “Hack has lived for a long time with the moods of windows…. (T)hey display for him the humble machinery of everyday living - shoemaker’s equipment, the chairs and cabinets of a barber shop, a tailor’s padded pressing iron – always silent, always at rest, intensified to the highest degree by isolation and close scrutiny. But his collection of Sunday morning glimpses into little offbeat shops is neither a social document, in the manner of Edward Hopper, nor a celebration of the mechanized, in the style of Charles Sheeler. It is a document of Howard Hack’s perceptions, reactions, and experiments.” In 1981, the California Palace of the Legion of Honor presented a collection of works in silverpoint by Howard Hack. The show’s catalog curator Robert Flynn Johnson wrote: “What will people think of Howard Hack’s art one hundred years from now? What will they think of the time, patience and concentration necessary to create these works? What will they think of his seductive style and idiosyncratic subject matter? I believe that Howard Hack’s art will age far more gracefully than the strained and artistic fashions that currently strut upon the stage of history. Time will tell.” In San Francisco, Howard Hack was represented by several galleries, including Richard Gump’s and John Bolles. In New York, Hack’s works were sold through Lee Nordness Gallery.

His art studio at 54 Cook Street in the Laurel Heights neighborhood of San Francisco was left abandoned for more than 15 years, but sold in 2016 for 1.5 million dollars despite decrepit conditions. The same property turned millions in the early 2020s, but no reference to it being Hack's art studio remained. In Hack's obituary, its remembered how 54 Cook Street became an afterschool play area for students from Laurel Hill Nursery School while Howard (Hondo) was still involved with the property. He rented the downstairs to a woman named Dorothy Collier who taught at Laurel Hill in the late 1970s to 1980s and lived on the bottom floor with 60 cats. Hack would often be around in the studio upstairs and sometimes brought his own children by the studio/afterschool care spot. November 14, 2017 "Everyday after Laurel Hill pre-school, Hondo, Russell, myself and a few others would take the steps down to Howard's house where we would stay and play until our parents picked us up. Cook Island! - what a place to be a four year old! Thank you Howard" wrote an old friend on the memory board of his obituary. Hack died in 2015.

== Exhibitions ==
=== Solo exhibitions ===
Information regarding One-Person Shows, Group Exhibitions, Collections, Awards and Prizes for Howard Hack is drawn primarily from the catalog for Howard Hack: Silverpoint Drawing Series, 1967 - 1981, An Exhibition organized by the Achenbach Foundation for Graphic Arts, The Fine Arts Museums of San Francisco, California Palace of the Legion of Honor (1981).

- Galeria de la Parroquia, San Miguel de Allende, Mexico, 1959
- Bolles Gallery, San Francisco, 1962
- Bolles Gallery, New York, 1963
- Gump’s Gallery, San Francisco, 1965, 1968, 1971, 1972
- M.H. de Young Memorial Museum, San Francisco, 1967
- San Jose College, 1968
- Lee Nordness Gallery, New York, 1968
- Santa Barbara Museum of Art, 1972
- Mills College, Oakland, 1972 (Retrospective)
- Triangle Gallery, San Francisco, 1976
- Zara Gallery, San Francisco, 1978
- “Selections from the Blue Print Series,” University Art Gallery, California State University, Chico, 1980

=== Group exhibitions ===
- Western Painters Annual, Oakland Art Museum, 1955, 1957, 1961
- Winter Invitational, California Palace of the Legion of Honor, San Francisco, 1961
- 24th Annual Drawing and Sculpture Exhibition, San Francisco Museum of Art, 1961
- Pittsburgh International Painting and Sculpture Annual Invitational, Carnegie Institute, Pittsburgh, 1964, 1967
- Whitney Annual of Contemporary Art, Whitney Museum of American Art, New York, 1965, 1967
- 29th Corcoran Biennial, Corcoran Gallery of Art, Washington, D.C., 1965
- Lee Nordness Gallery, New York, 1967
- National Drawing Exhibition (Invitational Annual), San Francisco Museum of Art, 1970
- “Looking West,” Joslyn Art Museum, Omaha, 1970
- National Academy of Design 148th Annual, New York, 1973
- Zara Gallery, San Francisco, 1975
- Grand Rapids Art Museum, Michigan, 1975
- Flint Institute of Arts, Michigan, 1975
- San Francisco Museum of Modern Art, 1976
- National Collection of Fine Arts, Smithsonian Institution, Washington, D.C., 1977
- “Bay Area”: Painting Invitational, Richmond Art Center, 1979
- “Realism”: Walnut Creek Civic Arts Gallery, 1980
- "Luminous Line: Contemporary Drawing in Metalpoint": Ruth Chandler Williamson Gallery, Scripps College (1967)

== Collections ==
Hack's works are in private collections and the following public and institutional collections:

- Achenbach Foundation for the Graphic Arts, The Fine Arts Museums of San Francisco
- Art Museum of South Texas, Corpus Christi, Texas
- Fogg Art Museum, Cambridge, Massachusetts
- Metro Media, Los Angeles
- National Museum of American Art, Washington, D.C.
- Oakland Art Museum
- San Jose Museum of Art, San Jose, California
- Seattle First National Bank, Washington
- Sara Roby Foundation, New York
- San Francisco Museum of Modern Art
- Smithsonian American Art Museum, Washington, D.C.
- University of San Francisco
- Whitney Museum of American Art, New York

== Awards and prizes ==
- Jack London Art Festival, Oakland, California: First Prize, 1961, 1964, 1965
- Painted Flower Exhibition, The Oakland Art Museum: Purchase Awards, 1962, 1963
- San Francisco Museum of Art 84th Annual: Ann Bremer Memorial Award, 1965
- Whitney Annual of Contemporary Art, Whitney Museum of American Art, New York: Neysa McMein Purchase Award
- National Academy of Arts and Letters, New York, Richard and Hinda Rosenthal Foundation Award for Painting, 1966
- Whitney Annual of Contemporary Art, Whitney Museum of American Art, New York, Sara Robey Foundation Award for Painting, 1967
- American Academy of Arts and Letters: Childe Hassam Foundation Purchase Award, 1969
