= Boulevard (restaurant) =

Restaurant in San Francisco, CA

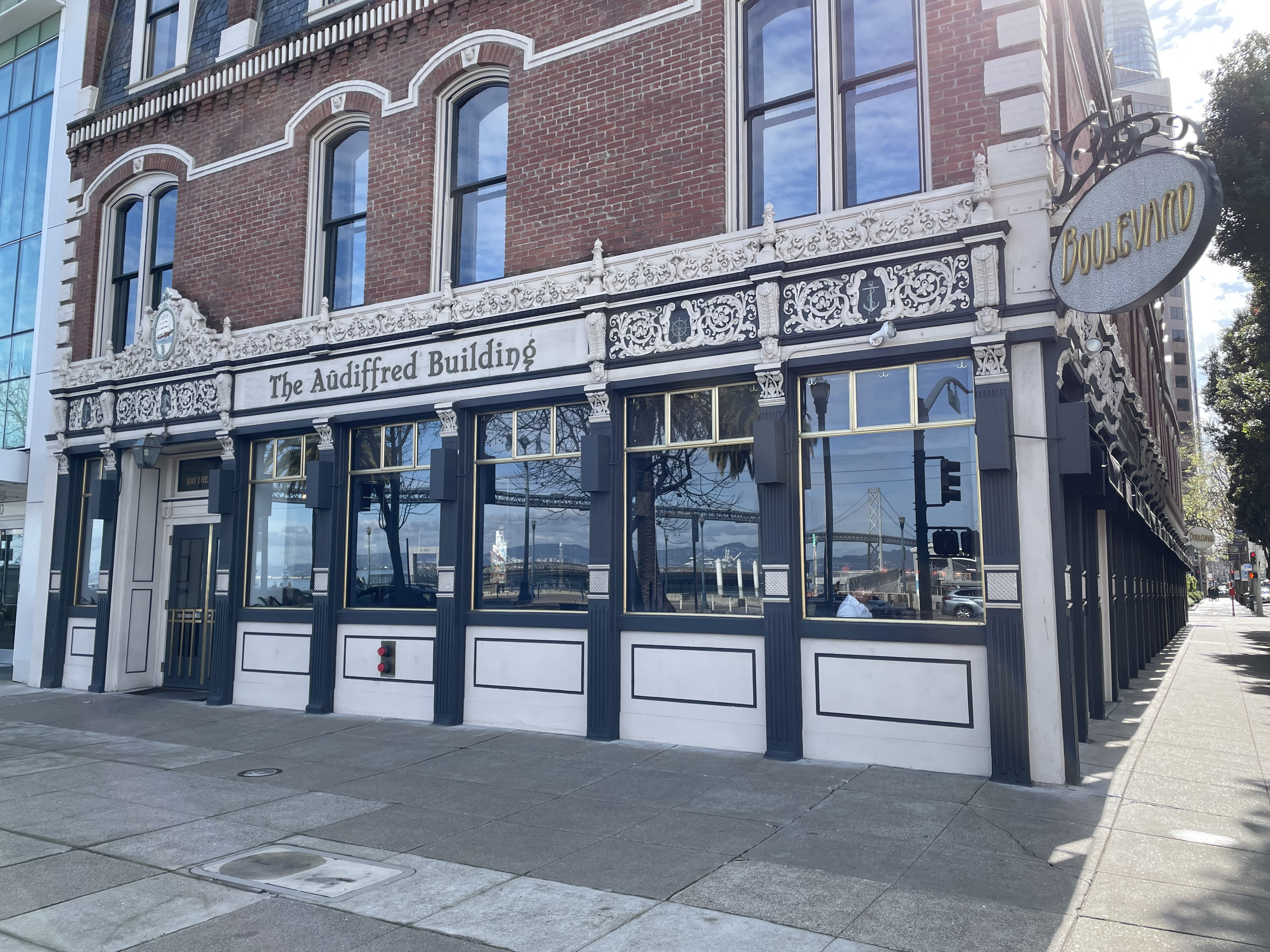
- Interactive map of Boulevard

Restaurant information
- Established: September 29, 1993
- Owner: Nancy Oakes
- Head chef: Nancy Oakes
- Chef: Dana Younkin
- Food type: California continental
- Dress code: Casual
- Location: 1 Mission Street, San Francisco, California, 94105, United States
- Coordinates: 37.79323°N 122.39287°W
- Website: www.boulevardrestaurant.com

Boulevard is a fine dining restaurant in San Francisco, California. It occupies the street level of the Audiffred Building, on the corner of Mission Street and the Embarcadero; the kitchen is in the basement.

== History ==
The restaurant was opened by Nancy Oakes and restaurant designer Pat Kuleto in 1993. Dana Younkin, who started at Boulevard in 2006, became executive chef in the early 2010s; a former executive chef, Pamela Mazzola, opened Prospect with Oakes and Kathy King in 2010.

Boulevard closed during the COVID-19 pandemic and reopened on September 29, 2021, its 28th anniversary. The Belle Epoque-style interior, intended by Kuleto to evoke "an ancient Parisian bistro beneath the Eiffel Tower", was lightened by designer Ken Fulk, with shades of blue replacing some of the dark wood. The New York Times subsequently described the decor as "an ornate mash-up of William Morris-style patterns and Art Deco accents". The menus were revised, and a bar and lounge serving à la carte food was added at the front of the restaurant.

== Cuisine ==
Boulevard serves seasonal California cuisine. The food was described in 2000 as "New American comfort food", and later as reminiscent of a French bistro, including pork chops grilled in a wood-burning oven. After the reopening, the menu has more Italian and Japanese influences, described by the New York Times as California continental, and includes more vegetable and seafood dishes; the oven has been replaced by an Italian charcoal oven.

== Reception ==
In 2013, the San Francisco Chronicle called Boulevard "a favorite with both locals and tourists". In 2014, the reviewer called the desserts "as good as the savory courses." This was repeated in 2018, when Boulevard was included in the Chronicle's list of the top 100 restaurants in the Bay Area and food critic Michael Bauer also praised Oakes for "ma[king] vegetables on the plate as exciting as the protein." The New York Times included Boulevard in its 2023–24 list of the 25 best restaurants in San Francisco; food critic Brian Gallagher singled out the pastry selection as "formidable".

Oakes won the 2001 James Beard Award for best chef in California. Boulevard won the 2012 James Beard Award for Outstanding Restaurant; the restaurant had received a record 8 consecutive nominations.

== See also ==
- List of New American restaurants
