= Karl Kasten =

American artist, educator (1916–2010)

Karl Albert Kasten
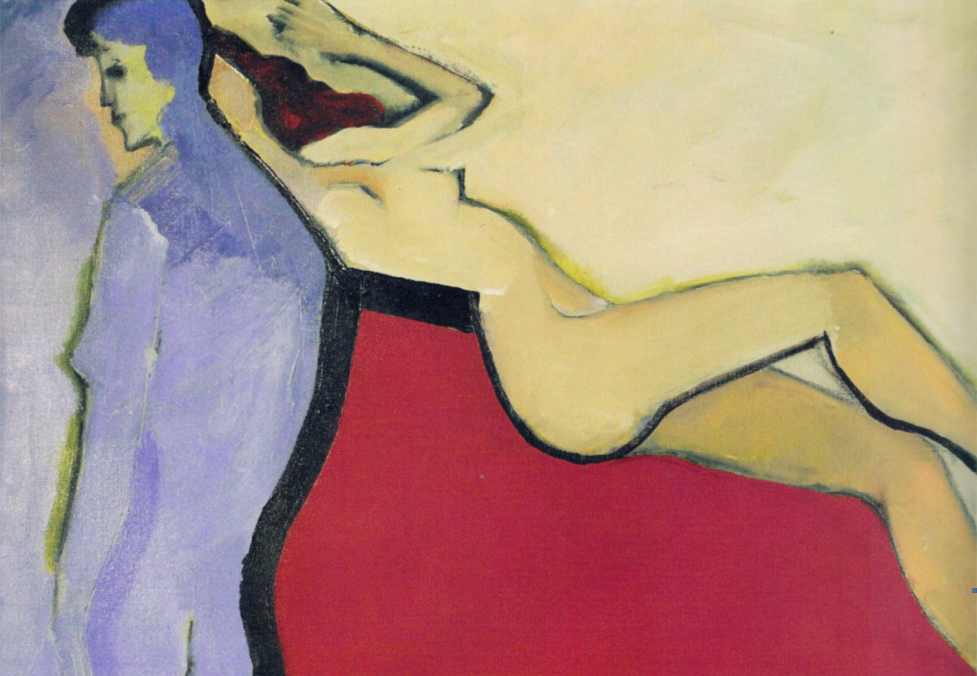
- The Couple, 1993, acrylic on canvas, 34" x 42"
- Born: March 5, 1916; San Francisco, California, U.S.
- Died: May 3, 2010 (aged 94); Berkeley, California, U.S.
- Education: California School of Fine Arts; College of Marin; University of California, Berkeley (BA, MA)
- Known for: Painting, printmaking, teaching

Karl Albert Kasten (March 5, 1916 – May 3, 2010) was an American painter, printmaker, and educator, from the San Francisco Bay Area.

== Early life ==
Karl Albert Kasten was born on March 5, 1916, in San Francisco, California. He was the fourth child of Ferdinand Kasten and his wife Barbara Anna Kasten, and he grew up in San Francisco's Richmond District. He was a student of art from an early age and regularly competed with his older brother Fred in battleship drawing contests. Fred eventually gave up but Karl continued. At times, Kasten's art seemingly got in the way of his schoolwork and his sixth grade teacher was driven to send a note home: "Dear Mr. Kasten, Do something about your son. All he wants to do is draw. He's not paying attention in school" Fortunately, his father sent a note back to the teacher: "Let him draw."

The same year, with financial help from his older brother Fred, Karl furthered his artistic advancement at the California School of Fine Arts (later renamed to San Francisco Art Institute, now defunct) and his explorations of art continued from there. Following his graduation from San Francisco Polytechnic High School, Kasten pursued an education in fine art.

== Education ==
Kasten attended College of Marin, and he later transferred to the University of California, Berkeley. His early mentors came from the "Berkeley School" including: John Haley, Erle Loran, Margaret Peterson, and Worth Ryder. Following the mode of the "Berkeley School" Kasten painted landscapes with flat planes punctuated with color. His work from this period earned him recognition and prizes in annual painting competitions held at the San Francisco Museum Of Art (now SFMoMA).

Kasten was also an editorial cartoonist and Arts Editor for The Daily Californian newspaper. His cartoons regularly featured reflections on the New Deal and the conflicts in Europe. By coincidence the success of Berkeley's Golden Bears also marked an interesting chapter in Kasten's artistic adventure. As part of the Rally Committee, Kasten designed and directed the card stunts for the 1938 Rose Bowl against Alabama's Crimson Tide. The card sequence depicted Berkeley's Campanile covered over by a surging red tide. As the tide receded, a bear appeared in a rowboat and rowed across the tide. Cal won, 13-0. Kasten describes the stunts as, "The greatest work of art I ever did." He went on to complete his B.A and M.A degrees at UC Berkeley. Following his graduation he taught briefly at the California School of Fine Arts but the attack on Pearl Harbor led him to wartime service.

== World War II ==
Kasten enlisted in the U.S. Army following the attack on Pearl Harbor. Kasten was initially assigned to the medical corps but ended up in the engineers corps where his artistic skills were used for camouflage. After Officer Candidate School he was deployed to England to serve with the 295th Engineer Combat Battalion. On D-Day he was promoted to captain and put in charge of the Intelligence unit of the Battalion. Kastens' memories of the war are dark and he recalls bluntly, "My job was to kill people", and "I was pretty miserable inside."

== Educator ==
After the war, Kasten continued with his art education. Rather than return to his budding career in the Bay Area, Kasten chose to establish himself in a new area without ties. He taught for two years (1946–1947) at the University of Michigan at Ann Arbor under the chairmanship of Jean Paul Slusser. Ultimately the Michigan winters drove his return to the Bay Area where he again took an assistant professor of art position at the San Francisco State University (SFSU). He spent three years at SFSU (1949–1950) where he introduced a printmaking program. During the summer of 1949 he studied modern etching techniques and printmaking with Lasansky at the University of Iowa.

The following year in 1950 he was offered a professorship UC Berkeley, which he held until 1983. "That was Nirvana" he said. "My greatest satisfaction is that I was a pretty good teacher."

== Painting and printing ==
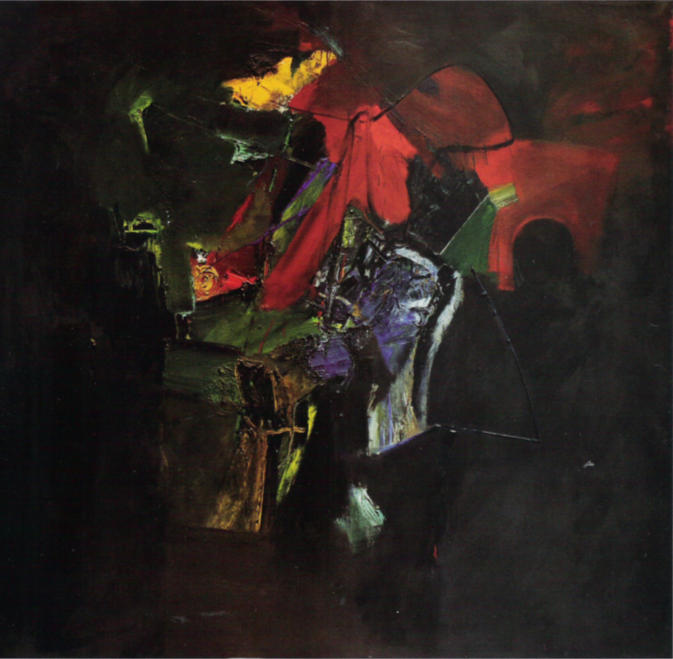
Dante, 1962, oil on canvas, 63" x 68"

In the early 1950s Kasten experimented with Cubism and non-objective painting but after studying at the Hans Hofmann School in Provincetown, Massachusetts in '51 he turned to Abstract Expressionism. Hofmann's modern art philosophy stressed "pictorial structure, spatial illusion, and color relationships". In her biography of the San Francisco School of Abstract Expressionism Susan Landauer noted Kasten as the artist who came closest to these tenets. Of that period Kasten said, "It was a great period to work in. Just letting things flow and seeing what happens... I think I got more color into painting during that time than most guys."

Kasten's paintings are predominantly acrylics on canvas, but he also works in watercolor and gouache. The graphics are primarily drawings in pencil, monoprints, drypoints and collagraphs. In the 1960s he began working in collography which is a variation of the etching process first practiced by Rudolph Nesch in the 1930s. Kasten's collographs are noteworthy for the sensitivity in texture and for the use of insertable parts such as coins and found objects to print a range of colors.

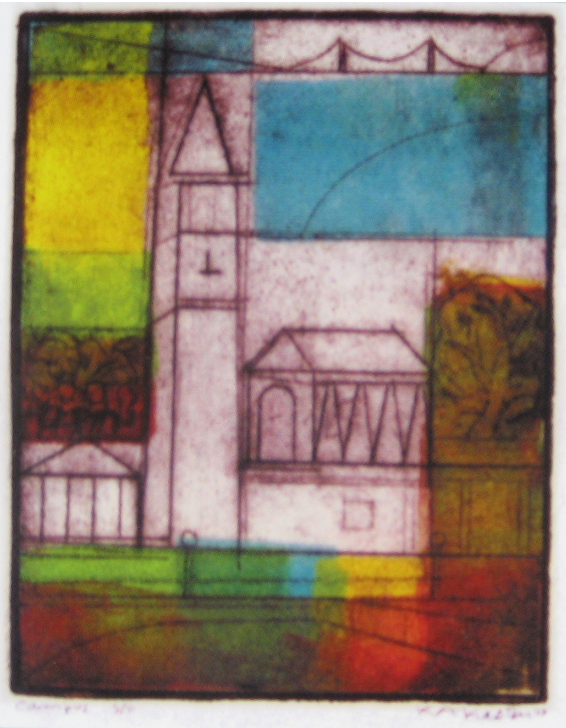
Campus Drypoint, 1999

In addition to his wide record of painting exhibitions, Karl Kasten is known worldwide as a master printer. In 1950, he established the Printmaking program and a course in Materials and Techniques at UC Berkeley. Kasten's aim and underlying credo with the courses was that printmaking could equal traditional painting through creative exploration. After viewing his colorful etchings of the 1950s, art critic Alfred Frankenstein observed that Kasten had "discovered a new softness, liquidity, and fluency of effect in the bitten plate and with this a new way of expressing the modern artist's preoccupation with space and movement." Susan Landauer recognized Kasten in her monograph Breaking Type: The Art of Karl Kasten, with one or two exceptions 'there were few examples of serious printmaking among Abstract Expressionists in New York.' Kasten has also been recognized for his printing accomplishments with the 1997 Distinguished Artist award of the California Society of Printmakers, the Humanities Research Fellowship and Tamarind Lithography Fellowship. David Acton refers to Kasten succinctly as "the dean of Bay Area printmaking."

In 1960 Kasten unexpectedly met Willem de Kooning at an art gathering. The meeting resulted in Kasten inviting de Kooning to the Berkeley campus where he pulled his first lithographs. Kasten has since lectured widely on the unique tools, technique and genius which de Kooning employed in the two lithographs.

In the 1970s, he designed a lightweight press (The KB Press) in conjunction with the Berglin Corporation that can now be found in schools and studios around the world.

== Collections ==
Kasten has exhibited in the São Paulo Bicentennial and World Print III Traveling Show, as well as the M. H. de Young Museum and California Palace of the Legion of Auckland Art Gallery Toi o Tāmakionor, the Art Institute of Chicago, the San Francisco Museum of Modern Art, and the Whitney Museum of American Art, among others.

His works are in the collections of the San Francisco Museum of Modern Art; the Oakland Art Museum; San Jose Museum of Art; New York Public Library; Museum of Modern Art, New York City; M. H. de Young Memorial Museum; Achenback Collection; Musée des Beaux Arts, Rennes; Auckland Art Gallery Toi o Tāmaki, New Zealand; and the Victoria and Albert Museum, London.

Texts dealing with his work include "Etching" by L. Edmondson, 1973; "Modern Woodcut Techniques" by A. Kurasaki, 1977; "The California Style", by G. McClelland and J. Last, 1985; "Breaking Type, The Art of Karl Kasten" by Susan Landauer.

Kasten retired from teaching in 1983 but his passion for art and learning kept him busy. He continued to lecture occasionally, paint enthusiastically, and work on his memoirs until his death. He also continued to draw.
