= Edward Corbett (artist) =

American Abstract Expressionist artist

Edward Corbett (August 22, 1919 – June 6, 1971) was an American Abstract Expressionist artist.

== Biography ==
Corbett was born in Chicago, Illinois, to John Leland Corbett and Laura Corbett. His father was in the United States Army, so the family moved often. Corbett lived in Virginia, Washington, D.C., Texas, Manilla and Ohio all before he turned 14.

He took his first art classes at the Dayton Art Institute in Ohio when he was 11 years old. He continued to pursue the arts throughout high school. In 1937, he began taking summer courses at the California School of Fine Arts (CSFA) and eventually enrolled full-time to learn under Lee F. Randolph, Otis Oldfield and William A. Gaw. Corbett flourished as a student at CSFA and was awarded the Albert Bender Scholarship, Robert Howe Fletcher Award and the Anne Bremer Memorial Scholarship. After his studies, he was drafted into the army, but continued to draw when he could. Corbett was discharged in 1943 and joined the American Abstract Artists in New York by 1946. He married Catherine Henck in 1944.

Corbett returned to San Francisco and Douglas MacAgy invited him to teach at CSFA, where he worked alongside Elmer Bischoff, Hassel Smith, David Park, Clay Spohn, Richard Diebenkorn, Mark Rothko and Clyfford Still. During part of his teaching career at CSFA, Corbett lived in Point Richmond in a house with Robert & Mary Fuller McChesney and Hassel & June Smith. He began to paint his famous black paintings. Some notable works based on his time there are Point Richmond and Evening of the Eclipse. He also taught an advanced drawing and painting course at U.C. Berkeley where Sam Francis was among his students.

Corbett got his big break when Dorothy Miller chose to exhibit his work in the 15 Americans exhibition at the Museum of Modern Art. It was for this catalog that he wrote his now infamous phrase, "I intend my work as poetry". Grace Borgenicht added Corbett to her roster of artists in 1952. Corbett continued to exhibit with Borgenicht for the rest of his career as an artist. He also continued to teach: Mount Holyoke College (1953–54), University of New Mexico (1956), Tulane University (1957), University of Minnesota (1960), Mount Holyoke (1962–63), American University (1966) and UC Santa Barbara (1967–68). He died in Provincetown, Massachusetts. At the time of his death, he was married to the painter Rosamond Walling Tirana Corbett (1910–1999), who was the daughter of Anna Strunsky and William English Walling.

His artwork can be found in both private and public collections. U.S. President Barack Obama borrowed Washington, D.C. November 1963 III from the National Gallery of Art.
