= George Henry Burgess =

English American painter (1831–1905)

- Born: George Henry Burgess; 8 June 1831; London, England
- Died: 22 April 1905 (aged 73); Berkeley, California, United States
- Known for: Painting, Wood engraving, Lithography
- Movement: Realism

George Henry Burgess (8 June 1831 – 22 April 1905) was an English American painter, wood engraver and lithographer. In London, he received training in lithography. With two other brothers preceding them, in 1850 Burgess traveled to California in the company of his brother Charles. Once there, the Burgess brothers set up a jewelry and watch repair business in Sonora. Unsuccessful at mining, George spent time sketching the gold fields and mining activity. In 1856, he made the first of three trips to Hawaii, where he painted the royal family and made preparations for lithographic views of Honolulu. In San Francisco, his primary source of income was painting portraits, but he often revisited the Gold Rush theme. Burgess' most well-known work is the massive San Francisco in July, 1849, now located at the Oakland Museum of California.

== Life and work ==
George Henry Burgess was born in London on 8 June 1831, (Note: Some otherwise reputable sources erroneously give his birth year as 1830.) One of four sons of a prominent London physician. Burgess studied "artistic lithography" at the Somerset School House School of Design, and then apprenticed at a commercial lithography firm in London. George's eldest brother, Edward, had journeyed to San Francisco in 1847, eventually setting up a trading business between California and Hawaii. Another brother, Hubert, a professional artist, in 1850 set out for California from New York on news of the California Gold Rush. In the same year, George and his brother Charles, a portrait painter and photographer, traveled over the Great Plains in search of their fortune.

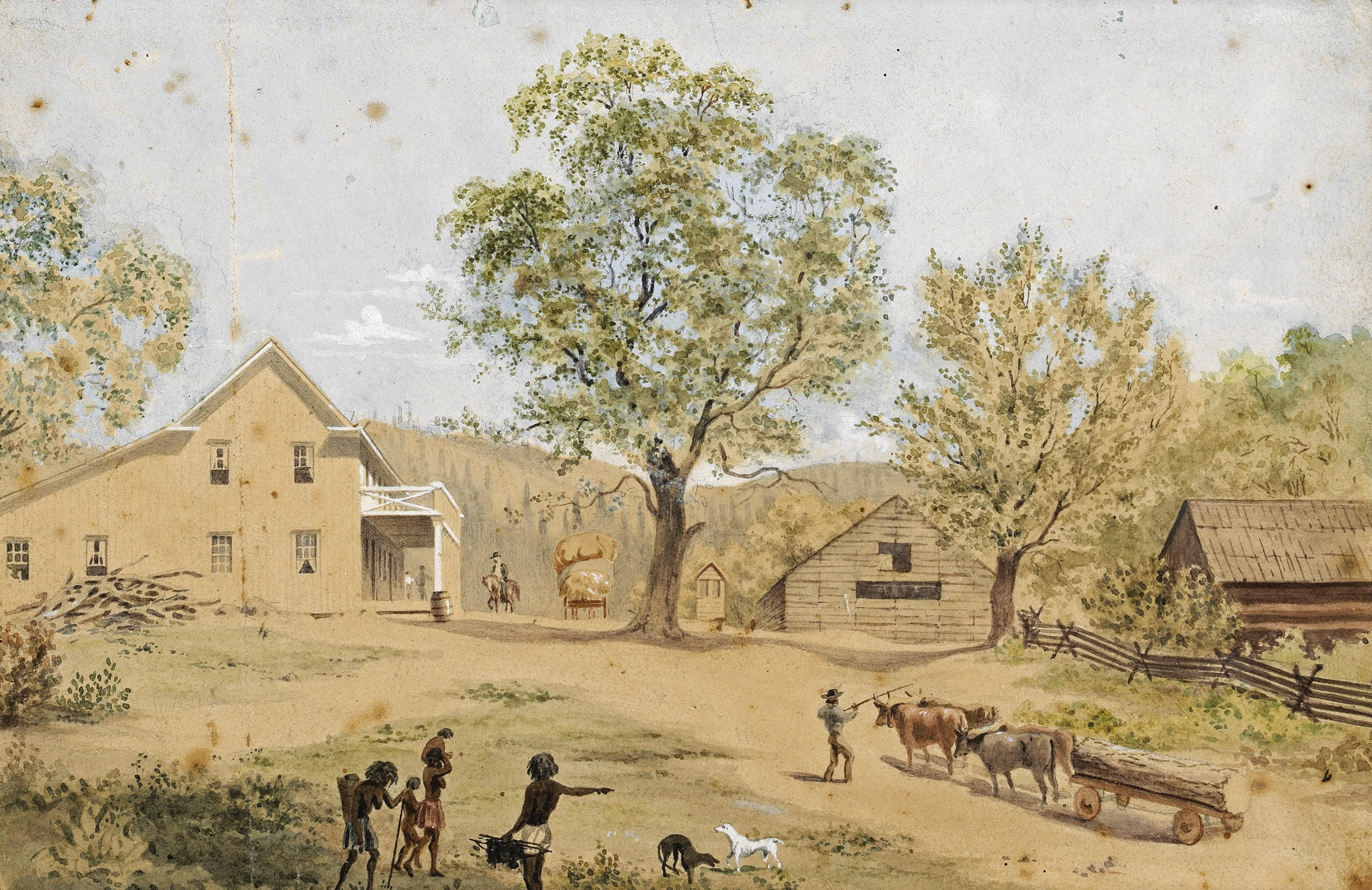
Mother Lode Inn

After initial gold prospecting attempts, Hubert, Charles, and George Burgess opened a jewelry shop in Sonora. Operating out of a tent, they repaired watches and made gold chains for the miners. Due to local disturbances, the brothers disbanded their operations. Hubert and George continued to hunt together, supplying meat for restaurants and boardinghouses. They also engaged in sketching trips around the Mother Lode area. George's pictures are noteworthy for their attention to factual detail and reduced emphasis of romantic characteristics. He frequently worked on location using pencil, or pen and ink on paper, supplanted at times by watercolor. His production included minaitures, genre scenes and landscapes. Burgess periodically returned to the Gold Rush theme in the ensuing decades. In 1854, he lithographed a view of San Francisco city and harbor, based on a daguerreotype by the photographer George Howard Johnson.

Burgess made three trips to Hawaii. His longest stay was 1855–1856, with shorter visits in 1866 and 1871. On his first visit he advertised himself as 'Artist and Wood Engraver'. George's brothers lived in Honolulu for various periods of time. Hubert ran a jewelry business, receiving royal commissions; Charles worked as a paperhanger; and Edward ran a coffee shop and sold his brothers’ artwork. Noteworthy among George's Honolulu output were his pendant portraits of King Kamehameha IV and Queen Emma. The oil on paper works were based on preliminary sketches and possibly daguerreotype images. Upon his return to San Francisco, Burgess lithographed a series of Honolulu views, printed by the firm of Britton & Rey. However, Burgess gave up lithography after quarrels over his production time and perceived credit as the principal draftsman.

Burgess is listed in the 1858 San Francisco directory as a wood engraver. In 1858 as well, seeking gold once again, Burgess followed the Fraser River Gold Rush in British Columbia, voyaging upriver by canoe. He sold one of his paintings to Governor James Douglas. Burgess returned with many sketches, which he then transferred to glass and exhibited by magic lantern show.

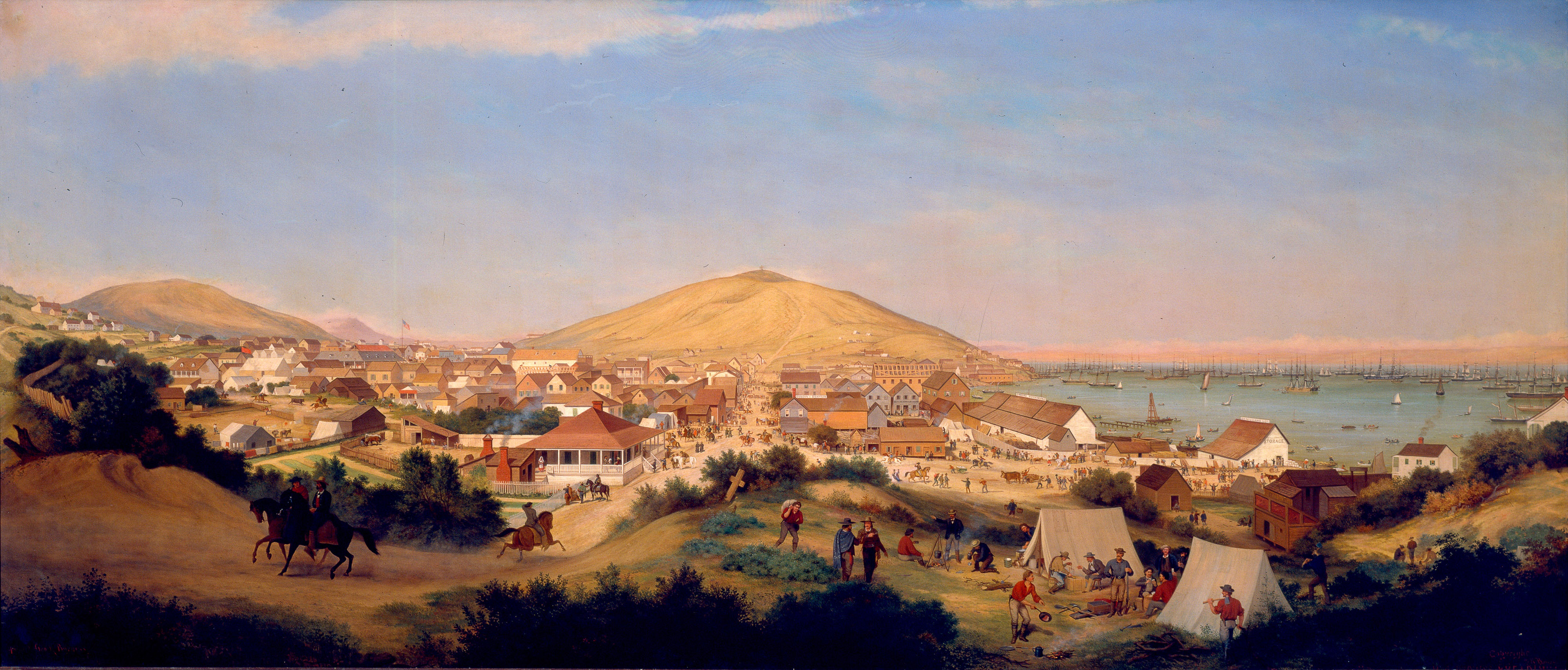
San Francisco in July, 1849

In San Francisco, Burgess opened a studio and began his career as a professional artist. For the next few decades, portrait commissions formed the bulk of his livelihood. He was especially noted for his skill in depicting ladies' gowns, which he would ask to borrow a few weeks before sittings in order to capture the decorative details. He also worked on photographic overpainting and retouching, a low-cost alternative to traditional portraits. Opportunities to display his work in San Francisco were few at first. In 1857, at the First Industrial Exhibition at the Mechanics' institute, he showed portraits, as well as three Honolulu views, the first to be shown in the country. The following year he exhibited watercolor landscapes. The 1864 exhibition showcased works from Puget Sound and the Yosemite Valley. In 1871, Burgess was one of the founding members of the San Francisco Art Association, and afterwards there were regular exhibitions and opportunities for patronage. On 18 July 1872, in London, Burgess married Emma Clint, daughter of the artist Alfred Clint. The couple had two daughters together.

In 1877, Burgess was commissioned to paint a full-length portrait of the mining baron James Clair Flood. While it is unknown if the painting still exists, Flood also commissioned View of San Francisco in 1850, for which Burgess received $650 and $100 for the frame. In 1882, Burgess began work on his magnum opus, the painting San Francisco in July, 1849. It measured a monumental five feet high by twelve feet long, and he spent four years in preparation. Burgess' main source was an 1849 watercolor triptych by William Birch McMurtrie. He also consulted sketches, daguerreotypes, and lithographs. In his quest for authenticity he obtained testimonials from two hundred pioneers. Prior to its completion in 1886, Burgess began a lengthy and unsuccessful search for a buyer, his asking price being ten thousand dollars. He didn't sign and copyright the work until 1891. The painting was exhibited at the 1892 California State Fair and the 1894 San Francisco Mid-Winter Fair. Burgess lost possession of the painting in 1897 when he effectively pawned it for two thousand dollars and was unable to redeem it. The work, which is now at the Oakland Museum of California, is the one for which he is best remembered today.

Burgess continued to paint until becoming an invalid in 1903. He died on 22 April 1905, in Berkeley.

== Collections ==
- Amon Carter Museum (Fort Worth), Texas
- Bancroft Library (University of California, Berkeley)
- Bernice Pauahi Bishop Museum, Honolulu
- Oakland Museum of California (Oakland, California)
- Yosemite Museum (Yosemite National Park, California)

== Gallery ==
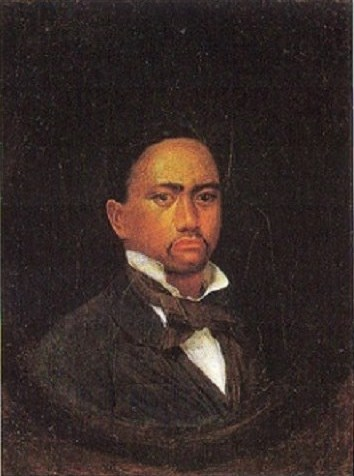
King Kamehameha IV, 1856

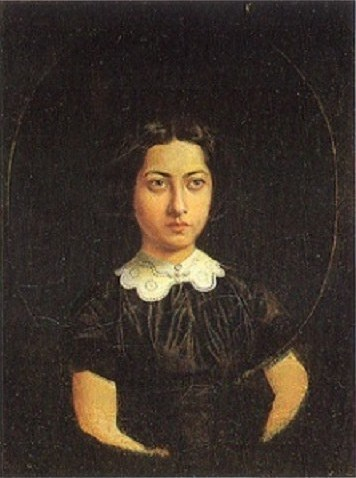
Queen Emma, 1856

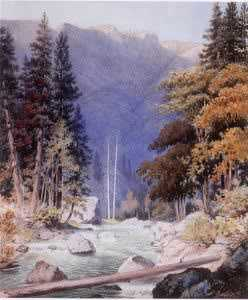
The Merced River, Yosemite Valley

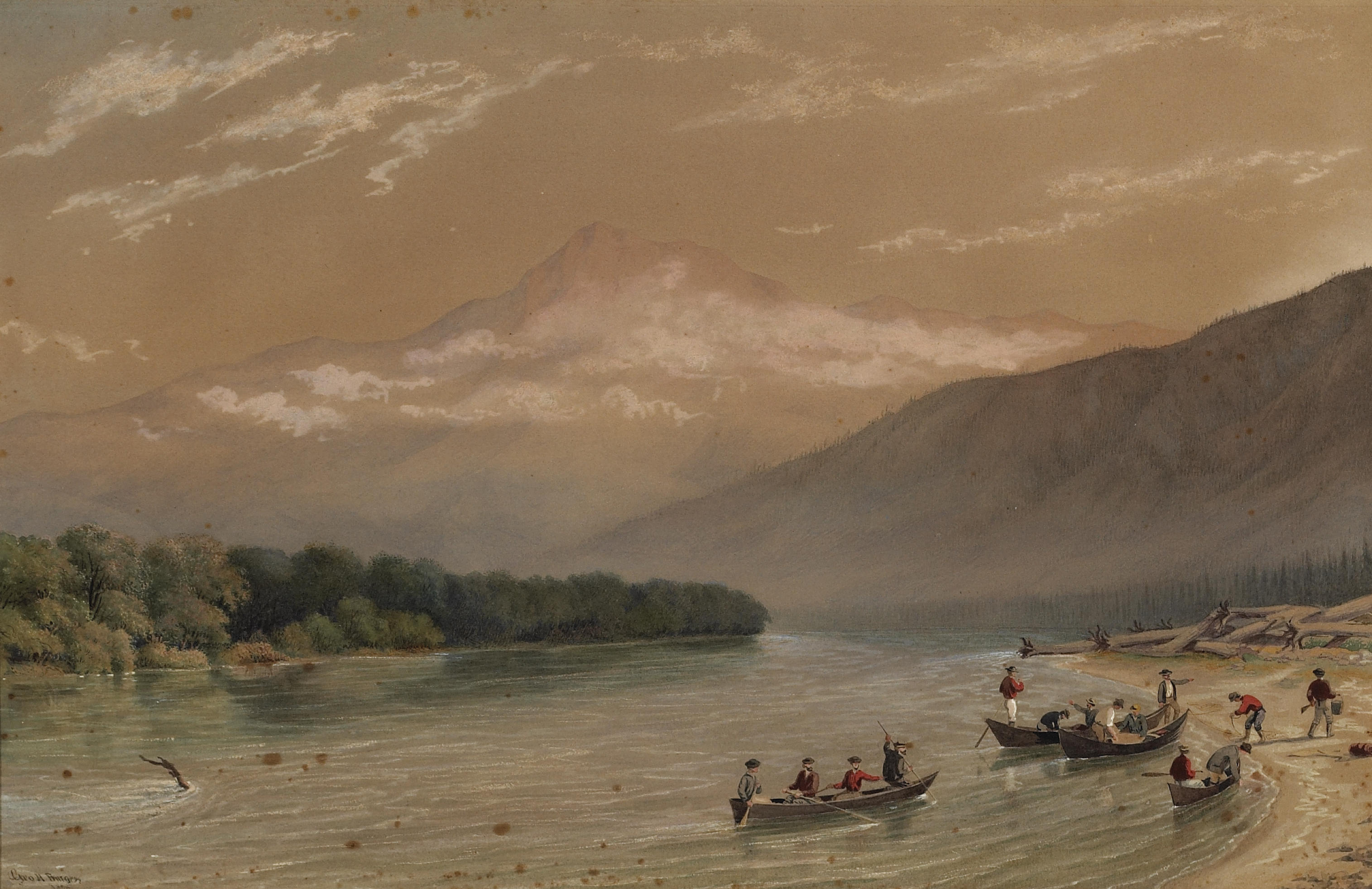
Frazer River Camp, 1858

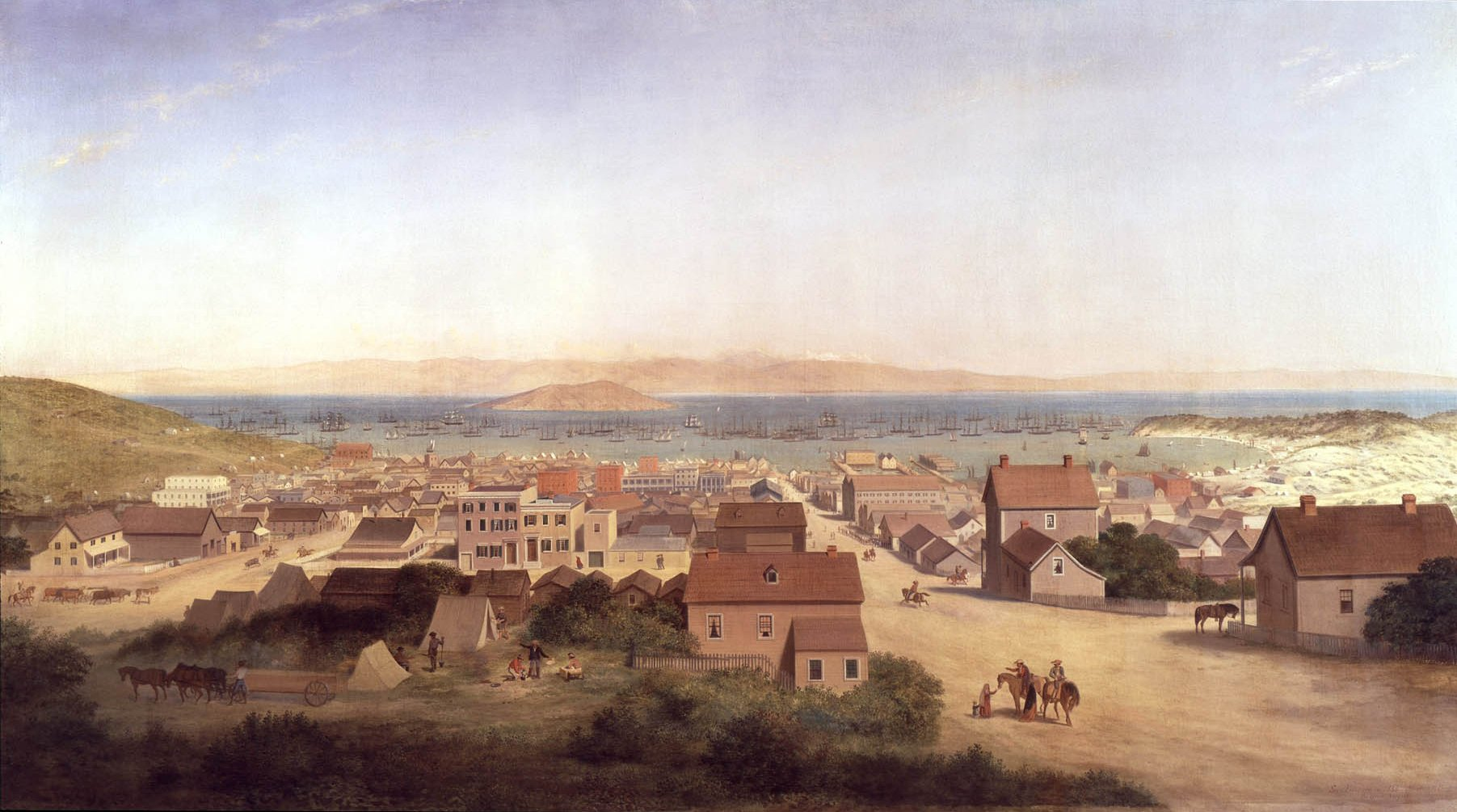
View of San Francisco in 1850, painted in 1878
