= Anna Weinberg (psychologist) =

Canadian psychologist

- Education: Wesleyan University; Stony Brook University
- Scientific career
- Fields: Psychology
- Workplaces: McGill University

Anna Weinberg is a psychologist, currently a Canada Research Chair in Clinical Neuroscience at McGill University.

Weinberg obtained a Bachelor of Arts degree at Wesleyan University in 2000; she completed graduate studies in clinical psychology at Stony Brook University, earning a Master of Arts degree in 2009 and a Ph.D. in 2014. She joined McGill as an assistant professor in 2015. Her research focuses on identifying biological pathways (using such methods as ERPs) that are involved in emotional functioning and dysfunction.
