= Jermayne MacAgy =

American art historian (1914–1964)

- Born: Jermayne Virginia Noble; February 14, 1914; Cleveland, Ohio, U.S.
- Died: February 18, 1964 (aged 50); Texas, U.S.
- Burial place: Forest Park Lawndale Cemetery, Houston, Texas, U.S.
- Other names: Jermayne Smart
- Education: Radcliffe College (BA), Harvard University (MA), Western Reserve University (PhD)
- Occupations: Art historian, museum professional, curator, professor
- Spouse(s): Douglas G. MacAgy (m. 1941–?; div.)

Jermayne Virginia MacAgy (née Jermayne Virginia Noble; February 14, 1914 – February 18, 1964) was an American art historian, museum professional, curator and professor. She also used the name Jermayne Smart.

== Early life and education ==
Jermayne Virginia Noble was born on February 14, 1914, in Cleveland, Ohio. Her mother was Rose Kathryne (née Corsila) and her father was Worthington H. Noble. Her parents separated when she was young, and her stepfather was John H. Smart. She used her stepfather's last name.

She received a B.A. degree in art history from Radcliffe College in 1935. She spent 1936 and 1937 in graduate school at Harvard University, the second of these two years devoted entirely to professor Paul Sachs’ now famous class “Museum Work and Museum Problems” taught at Harvard's Fogg Art Museum. She continued her graduate work at Western Reserve University (now Case Western Reserve University) where she studied the philosophy and psychology of art with Thomas Munro as a mentor. She gained her doctorate in philosophy at Western Reserve University with a 1939 dissertation on the folk art of the Western Reserve territory of Ohio.

She then started her career in the education department of the Cleveland Museum of Art and worked there from 1939–1941. She met Douglas MacAgy at the Cleveland Museum of art, and in 1941 they married. Although they later divorced, she used his name until her death.

Shortly before their marriage, the San Francisco Museum of Art had hired Douglas MacAgy as an assistant curator, and in March of that year Jermayne and Douglas moved to San Francisco.

== Career ==
MacAgy worked at the California Palace of the Legion of Honor in San Francisco for 14 years. Over the span of that time she held "positions ranging from curator to acting director". Throughout her career at the Legion of Honor she established a reputation for her exhibitions that were presented in a new and dramatic style, as well as her focus on the museum's educational outreach. In 1942, she hosted the first Jackson Pollock exhibition in San Francisco, following that with one-artist shows by Arshile Gorky, Robert Motherwell, Mark Rothko, and Clyfford Still. As a museum educator at the Legion of Honor she started a city funded program where other museum educators in the community could give slide lectures and installed mini displays in nearby schools.

In 1955, she became the director of the Contemporary Arts Museum Houston. There she "reinvented the space," especially by her use of new and diverse platforms of display that "included potted plants, beds of gravel and bark, temporary partitions, scrims, theatrical lighting, and pedestals of all shapes and sizes combined in unusual ways". Her exhibitions at the Contemporary Arts Association include Mark Rothko in 1957, "The Trojan Horse: The Art of the Machine" in 1958, "The Common Denominator: Modern Design, 3500 BC- 1958 AD" in 1958, and "Romantic Agony: From Goya to de Kooning" in 1959. In 1959, she mounted her first exhibition at Mies van der Rohe's Cullinan Hall, a new wing of Houston's Museum of Fine Arts designed by Mies van der Rohe: "Totems Not Taboo: An Exhibition of Primitive Art," which earned accolades from Buckminster Fuller and Rene d'Harnoncourt, director of the Museum of Modern Art.

In 1959, she left the Contemporary Arts Museum to "teach art history and curate exhibitions for the University of St. Thomas" in Houston, Texas.
