= Tino Rodríguez =

Mexican-American painter

Tino Rodríguez is a Mexican-American painter. Born and raised in Guadalajara, Mexico, Rodriguez was influenced by the symbolism and themes evident in the Catholic churches of his youth. His work was also influenced by his absorption of fairy tales.

His work incorporates fantastical imagery combining animal and human forms, as well as dream-like backgrounds and settings.

His work has been exhibited at numerous venues in San Francisco.

The exhibition Tino Rodríguez: The Darkening Garden/El Jardin al Anochecer was featured at the San Jose Museum of Art in 2003.

Rodriguez studied at the Sorbonne in 1990. He received his Bachelor of Fine Arts degree from the San Francisco Art Institute and his Master of Fine Arts from the University of New Mexico.
