= Lloyd Wulf =

Lloyd William Wulf (September 2, 1913 – November 17, 1965) was an American artist from Nebraska who lived and worked in Quito, Ecuador for many years.

== Life before Ecuador ==
Wulf was born in Nehawka, Nebraska and grew up in Avoca, Nebraska.

Wulf studied at the San Francisco School of Fine Arts early in the 1930s and met Oregonian Helen Purdy there whom he married. He created paintings, drawings, and prints of people and "burlesque" clowns in carnival settings. He also did projects for the Works Progress Administration.

== Ecuador ==
The couple moved to Quito, Ecuador where he taught at the American School and drew local people and scenes. In Quito, he was an employee of the American Embassy. He returned to Nebraska in poor health in 1964 died in November 1965. Oswaldo Viteri studied with him.

== Death and legacy ==
Wulf died in a hospital in Omaha, aged 52.

His work is in the Spencer Museum of Art and the National Gallery of Art.
