= William A. Gaw =

William Alexander Gaw

Director of California School of Fine Arts
- In office 1941–1945
- Preceded by: Lee Fritz Randolph
- Succeeded by: Douglas MacAgy

Personal details
- Born: November 26, 1891 San Francisco, California, United States
- Died: January 30, 1973 (aged 81) Berkeley, California, United States
- Spouse: Helen Baer
- Education: Mark Hopkins Institute of Art
- Occupation: Visual artist, educator, academic administrator

William Alexander Gaw (1891–1973) was an American painter, designer, educator, college director, and academic administrator. He was the director of California School of Fine Arts (later known as San Francisco Art Institute), and professor emeritus from Mills College (now Mills College at Northeastern University). Gaw lived in Berkeley, California.

== Early life and education ==
William Alexander Gaw was born on November 26, 1891, in San Francisco, California. His father was Irish-born watercolorist, Hugh Gaw (1865–1928).

He studied art under landscape painter, James Martin Griffin (1850–1931). Gaw attended Mark Hopkins Institute of Art (later known as San Francisco Art Institute).

== Career ==
Gaw was known for his landscapes, still life paintings, and drawing. He taught at the California School of Fine Arts from 1938 to 1955; and from 1941 until 1945, Gaw was the director of that school. He was able to maintain enrollment at the school during World War II.

Gaw started teaching at Mills College (now Mills College at Northeastern University) in 1940, where he served as the chair of the art department from 1942 until 1957. He was professor emeritus from Mills College.

He was a member of the Bohemian Club, and the Free and Accepted Masons. Gaw's work is in museum collections, including at the Monterey Museum of Art, San Francisco Museum of Modern Art, and Crocker Art Museum.

He died on January 30, 1973, in Berkeley.
