= Anna Weinberg (restaurateur) =

American restaurateur

Anna Weinberg has been a restaurateur since the late 1990s. Before that, she was an actress. Weinberg was the co-owner and managing partner of Big Night Restaurant Group, which was dissolved in 2023.

When she was living in NYC and working in restaurants, she met Melissa O’Donnell and when she was 23, they opened a restaurant named Stella.

== Early life ==
Weinberg grew up in Waiheke Island, New Zealand and moved to New York City when she was 19. She moved to San Francisco with James Nicholas, her business partner and future husband (they have since divorced).

== Career ==
Her first San Francisco restaurant, South, an Australian, New Zealand, South African focused restaurant opened to critical acclaim in 2008. It was reconcepted to Marlowe in 2009.

She opened Park Tavern, a New York style brasserie, in 2011 with Dave Stanton.

Ken Fulk, Stanton, and Consulting partner Nancy Oaks took over Tosca Cafe in North Beach, San Francisco, in 2019 from previous owners April Bloomfield and Ken Friedman.

She has been involved with several other restaurants, including Park Tavern, The Cavalier, Petit Marlowe, Leo’s Oyster Bar, Marianne's, and Cow Marlowe.

She has said Jonathan Waxman, with whom she worked at Barbuto, taught her everything she knows.
