= Lee Fritz Randolph =

American painter, educator, academic administrator (1880–1956)

Director of California School of Fine Arts
- In office 1917–1941
- Preceded by: Pedro Joseph de Lemos
- Succeeded by: William Alexander Gaw

Personal details
- Born: June 3, 1880 Ravenna, Ohio, United States
- Died: September 3, 1956 (aged 76) Salinas, California, United States
- Resting place: El Carmelo Cemetery, Pacific Grove, California, United States
- Spouse(s): Marion Wilson Ellis (m. 1910–1927; her death), Hilda Southwell Bunt (m. 1933–1956; death)
- Relations: Louise Fitz Randolph (aunt)
- Education: Stevenson Art School, Cincinnati Art Academy, Art Students League of New York, Académie Julian, Académie Colarossi, École des Beaux-Arts
- Occupation: Painter, printmaker, educator, academic administrator

Lee Fritz Randolph (1880–1956) was an American painter, printmaker, educator, and academic administrator. He served as the director of California School of Fine Arts (now known as the San Francisco Art Institute). He taught painting, drawing, and anatomy courses.

== Early life and education ==
Lee Fritz Randolph III was born June 3, 1880, in Ravenna, Ohio. His parents were Clara North (née Lee) and Rev. Reuben Fitz Randolph Jr.. His mother family was from Virginia, and she was a distant relative of Gen. Robert E. Lee.

He studied at the Stevenson Art School in Pittsburgh, under Horatio S. Stevenson; the Cincinnati Art Academy (now Art Academy of Cincinnati), under Thomas Satterwhite Noble and Frank Duveneck; and the Art Students League of New York, under Kenyon Cox, and George Bridgman.

He traveled to Europe for some ten years to study art; including at study at Académie Julian in Paris, under Jean-Paul Laurens; at the Académie Colarossi in Paris; and the École des Beaux-Arts in Paris, under Léon Bonnat. He later studied in Florence and Rome. His older sister Anna Randolph (1976–1905), committed suicide in Rome on December 27, 1905, two months after Lee had moved to Rome. In 1913, Randolph returned to California.

== Career ==
Randolph was a figurative oil painter, known for his landscape and portraits; and a printmaker, known for his etchings. He was a member of the Bohemian Club, and the California Society of Etchers (now California Society of Printmakers). He was also affiliated with the Foundation for Western Art, and participated in their group exhibitions in the 1940s.

In 1915, he taught at the University of California, Berkeley (UC Berkeley) during the winter semester. He won a bronze medal for painting at the Panama–Pacific International Exposition, held in San Francisco.

Randolph served as the director of California School of Fine Arts (or CSFA, now San Francisco Art Institute) from 1917 to 1941. He took a CSFA sabbatical from 1941 to 1942. In 1925, he joined the summer faculty of Brigham Young University's Big Alpine Summer School in the Mount Timpanogos–area of Utah.

The Randolph family moved to Carmel-by-the-Sea, California in the 1940s, where he continued to teach visual art and was a member of the Carmel Art Association.

== Death and legacy ==
Randolph died on September 3, 1956, in Salinas, California. His memorial service was held at Little Chapel by the Sea in Pacific Grove, California, and he was survived by his wife Hilda.

His work is included in museum collections, including at the Smithsonian American Art Museum (SAAM) in Washington, D.C.. He previously had his work in the collection at Musée du Luxembourg in Paris (in the 1920s).
