= Douglas MacAgy =

Canadian-born American curator, academic administrator (1913–1973)

Director of the California School of Fine Arts
- In office July 1, 1945 – 1950
- Preceded by: William Alexander Gaw
- Succeeded by: Ernest Karl Mundt

Director of the Dallas Museum for Contemporary Arts (now Dallas Museum of Art)
- In office 1963–1959

Director of National Exhibitions at the National Endowment for the Arts
- In office 1968–1972

Personal details
- Born: Douglas Guernsey MacAgy; June 8, 1913 Winnipeg, Manitoba, Canada
- Died: September 6, 1973 (aged 60) Washington, D.C., U.S.
- Resting place: Hillside Cemetery, Deer Isle, Maine, U.S.
- Spouse(s): Jermayne Noble (m. 1941–?; div.); Elizabeth Tillett (m. 1955–1973; his death)
- Children: 2
- Education: University of Toronto, Barnes Foundation, Courtauld Institute of Art, University of Pennsylvania, Cleveland School of Art, Case Western Reserve University
- Occupation: Art historian, curator, museum director, academic administrator, author

Douglas Guernsey MacAgy (June 8, 1913 – September 6, 1973) Canadian-born American curator, museum director, art historian, author, and academic administrator. He served as the director of the California School of Fine Arts (later known as San Francisco Art Institute) in San Francisco from 1945 to 1950.

== Early life and education ==
Douglas G. MacAgy was born in 1913, in Winnipeg. He attended the University of Toronto, the Barnes Foundation, the Courtauld Institute of Art of the University of London, the University of Pennsylvania, the Cleveland School of Art (now Cleveland Institute of Art) and Case Western Reserve University.

His first marriage was in 1941 to art historian Jermayne Noble for a number of years, and ended in divorce. MacAgy was remarried in 1955 to Elizabeth Tillett (1930–1980).

== Career ==
In 1941, he worked as an assistant curator to Grace Morley, who was the director of the San Francisco Museum of Art (now San Francisco Museum of Modern Art). He was later promoted to curator. From 1945 until 1950, MacAgy served as the director of the California School of Fine Arts (later known as the San Francisco Art Institute) on Russian Hill, San Francisco, succeeding William A. Gaw. MacAgy transformed the school through his promotion of Modernism. When he resigned from the role at CSFA in 1950 he was succeeded by Ernest Karl Mundt, and MacAgy started a new role as the executive director of Orbit Films.

MacAgy was a special consultant to the director of the Museum of Modern Art in New York City; and also worked as director of research for an art dealer in New York City, Wildenstein & Company.

MacAgy served as the director of the Dallas Museum of Contemporary Arts (now merged to form the Dallas Museum of Art) from 1959 to 1963. Under his leadership, the Dallas Museum of Contemporary Arts had merged in 1963 to form the Dallas Museum of Art.

MacAgy was the director of national exhibitions at the National Endowment for the Arts, from 1968 to 1972. In 1972, he was selected as the curator of the Hirshhorn Museum and Sculpture Garden in Washington, D.C.

== Death ==
MacAgy died at age 60 on September 6, 1973, at Georgetown University Hospital in Washington, D.C., after suffering from a heart attack a month earlier. He is buried at Hillside Cemetery in Deer Isle, Maine.

Posthumously the book, Douglas MacAgy and the Foundations of Modern Art Curatorship (2015) by David Beasley was published.

== Publications ==
- MacAgy, Douglas (1956). Monumentality in Modern Sculpture. Houston, Texas: Contemporary Arts Museum Houston.
- MacAgy, Douglas; MacAgy, Elizabeth (1959). Going For a Walk With a Line: A Step Into the World of Modern Art. Doubleday.
- MacAgy, Douglas (1959). The Romantic Agony: From Goya to De Kooning (exhibition catalogue). Houston, Texas: Contemporary Arts Museum Houston.
- MacAgy, Douglas (1961). Impressionists and Their Forebears from Barbizon: Dallas Museum for Contemporary Arts, March 9 - April 2, 1961 (exhibition catalogue). Dallas, Texas: Dallas Museum for Contemporary Arts.
- MacAgy, Douglas (1961). The Art That Broke the Looking Glass: The Dallas Museum for Contemporary Arts, November 15 to December 31, 1961 (exhibition catalogue). Dallas, Texas: Dallas Museum for Contemporary Arts.
- MacAgy, Douglas (1973). Jim Love in Pursuit of the Bear. Houston, Texas: Contemporary Arts Museum Houston.
- MacAgy, Douglas; United States Department of the Interior (1973). The American Artist and Water Reclamation: March 25 – May 5, 1972 (exhibition catalogue). United States Government Printing Office.
