= George Stillman =

American painter (1921–1997)

George Stillman (February 25, 1921 – March 12, 1997) was an American abstract expressionist artist and member of the San Francisco Bay Area group known as the "Sausalito Six".

== Biography ==
George Stillman was born in Laramie, Wyoming, but was raised in Ontario, California. He began working with photography while still a teenager and at the age of 17 or 18 won first prize for creative photography in the Golden Gate International Exposition. He got an associate degree at Chaffey College (1941) and then enrolled at the University of California, Berkeley, but in 1942 he was drafted to serve in the military in World War II.

After the war ended, he studied painting at the California School of Fine Arts (CSFA, now the San Francisco Art Institute), where he got to know a number of other emerging first-generation Bay Area Abstract Expressionist artists. With some of them, he formed a group that became known as the "Sausalito Six" because most lived in the waterfront town of Sausalito just north of San Francisco. The group consisted of Richard Diebenkorn, John Hultberg, Frank Lobdell, Walter Kuhlman, James Budd Dixon, and Stillman, who was one of the youngest members. Stillman lived in Oakland, where his parents had a photography studio, but he had close ties with the rest of the group and often visited them and exhibited with them.

The late 1940s were very active years for Stillman, who produced over 1000 paintings, prints, and other artworks in this period. His work ranged from pure abstraction to figurative subjects treated expressionistically; one writer refers to it as hailing from the "quietest branch of Abstract Expressionism, which preferred to transport the imagination rather than jolt the senses". During this period, he collaborated with other members of the Sausalito Six to create a portfolio of 17 lithographs entitled Drawings (1948) that is considered a landmark in the history of Abstract Expressionist printmaking. In 1949, the San Francisco Museum of Art honored him with the Ann Bremer Award. However, in the 1950s, when he went to Mexico to study and later take up a teaching job at the University of Guadalajara, he hauled most of his work to the dump. As a consequence, only a few dozen works survive from this phase of his career.

In the 1960s, Stillman went back to school, earning a B.F.A. (1968) and then an M.F.A. (1970) from Arizona State University. He subsequently taught art at Columbus College in Georgia (1970–72) and at Central Washington University (1972–88), where he was chair of the Art Department. He died in Ellensburg, Washington.

Stillman's work is held by the Metropolitan Museum of Art (New York), the Oakland Museum (California), the British Museum (London), and numerous other art institutions.
