= Martha Jackson =

American dealer and collector

Martha Kellogg Jackson
- Portrait of Martha Jackson, 1953 by Larry Rivers
- Born: January 17, 1907; Buffalo, New York, US
- Died: July 4, 1969 (aged 62); Los Angeles, California, US
- Education: Smith College
- Occupations: Art dealer and collector
- Spouse: John Anderson (divorced) David Jackson (divorced)
- Children: 2

Martha Jackson (née Kellogg; January 17, 1907 – July 4, 1969) was an American art dealer, gallery owner, and collector. Her New York City based Martha Jackson Gallery, founded in 1953, was groundbreaking in its representation of women and international artists, and in establishing the op art movement.

== Biography ==
Jackson was born Martha Kellogg on January 17, 1907, in Buffalo, New York. She was born into two prominent Buffalo families, the daughter of Cyrena (née Case; 1884-1931) and Howard Kellogg (1881-1969). She had two brothers, Spencer Kellogg II and Howard Kellogg, Jr. Jackson's mother's family founded and operated W. A. Case & Son Manufacturing Company which was eventually purchased in 1952 by what is now Covanta. Jackson's father was president of Spencer Kellogg & Sons, Inc., a linseed oil firm founded by his father, which became a division of Textron in 1961.

Jackson attended Smith College from 1925 to 1928 where she studied English. She moved to Baltimore during the war where she studied art history at Johns Hopkins University and the Baltimore Museum of Art. In 1949, following her interest in making art, Jackson moved to New York to attend the Hans Hofmann School of Art. Already an art collector, she took Hoffman's advice to become an art dealer, using sales from her personal collections to fund her gallery.

Jackson was married to John Anderson of Buffalo with whom she had two children, Cyrena (1934-1939) and David (1935-2009). The marriage ended in divorce. She was married a second time to attorney David Jackson of Buffalo from 1940 to 1949.

Martha Jackson died at age 62 at her Mandeville Canyon home in Brentwood, Los Angeles on July 4, 1969, after suffering a cerebral hemorrhage while swimming in her pool. She is interred at Forest Lawn Cemetery in Buffalo, NY.

== Martha Jackson Gallery ==
In 1953 Jackson opened the Martha Jackson Gallery in a brownstone on East 66th street in Manhattan. In 1955 the gallery moved to East 69th street, where it remained open until Jackson's death in 1969. Working with the assistance of her son, David Anderson, Jackson's gallery was known as an artist-friendly establishment that represented an international roster of artist from the US, England, Holland, France, Spain, Israel, Japan, and Canada. Among those in her stable were Henry Moore, Louise Nevelson, Lynn Chadwick, Norman Carton, Philip Pavia, Zoltán Kemény, Sam Francis, Grace Hartigan, Paul Jenkins, Lester Johnson, Frank Lobdell, Yaacov Agam, Karel Appel, Alan Davie, William Scott, Yves Gaucher, Jean McEwen, Philippe Hosiasson, and Antoni Tàpies — who had his New York solo debut at the gallery. The gallery also exhibited works by Francis Bacon and Marino Marini, New York School painters like Willem de Kooning, Hans Hofmann, and Adolph Gottlieb, deceased Americans Milton Avery, Alexander Calder, Arshile Gorky, and Marsden Hartley, and emerging artists Lawrence Calcagno, John Hultberg, Lee Krasner, and Norman Bluhm The enameled doors to Martha Jackson’s office were made by enamelist Paul Hultberg, brother of John Hultberg.

The gallery was the first in the US to exhibit Gutai, the Japanese postwar collective, and also one of the first to represent women. In addition to representing Louise Nevelson, Jackson worked with Alma Thomas— who became the first African American woman to mount a solo show at the Whitney Museum of American Art in New York — Lee Krasner, Marisol (Escobar), Barbara Hepworth, and Grace Hartigan. She also championed American artist from beyond the New York region, like Morris Louis in the 1950s, and Ed McGowin in the 1960s.

In the summer of 1960 Jackson mounted the proto-Pop New Forms — New Media exhibition, a subversive show featuring 72 works of art in the Dadaist tradition. The crowded exhibition, dubbed "wild and wacky" and "Neo-Dada" by John Canday in the New York Times, featured both historic and contemporary examples of mixed-media assemblage, high and low found objects that were both groundbreaking yet easily mistaken as household junk. The exhibition included works by Hans Arp, Kurt Schwitters, Alexander Calder, Joseph Cornell, Jean Dubuffet, Robert Mallary, Wilfrid Zogbaum, Robert Rauschenberg Bruce Conner, Zoltán Kemény, and Enrico Donatis that pushed against the social limits of art; interactive artworks that invited audience participation and blurred the boundaries between painting and sculpture. In the fall of 1960, the gallery launched a second installment of the exhibit, New Forms New Media II, which ran from September 22- October 22.

In 1961 Jackson opened Environments, Situations, Spaces, a follow-up to the New Forms — New Media shows. This exhibition consisted of site-specific and interactive works including Spring Cabinet, room of drippy paint buckets by Jim Dine; Yard, a courtyard full of salvaged tires by Allan Kaprow; as well as a recreation of Claes Oldenburg's Store.

Jackson worked with Julian Stanczak, and the gallery's 1964 exhibition of his paintings led to the coining of the term "Op Art" by Time Magazine. Around the same time, Jackson established Red Parrot Films, a production company that made documentaries on art and artists. Their film "The Ivory Knife," on Paul Jenkins, was awarded a prize at the Venice Biennale in the mid 1960s. The gallery was also a leader in the publishing and marketing of artist prints, and ephemera. Jackson and Anderson worked with Jim Dine, Sam Francis, Julian Stanczak, John Hultberg, and Karel Appel on limited editions.

Martha Jackson remained connected to her home town of Buffalo, NY and worked with Seymour Knox Jr., to enter works by Sam Francis, Louise Nevelson, and Antoni Tàpies into the Albright Knox collection.

== Collection and legacy ==
Following her death in 1969, works from Jackson's personal collection were donated to the Albright Knox Gallery in Buffalo, NY. The gift includes works by Norman Carton, Richard Diebenkorn, Jim Dine, Arshile Gorky, Adolph Gottlieb, Grace Hartigan, Alfred Jensen, Piero Manzoni, Claes Oldenburg, Antoni Tàpies, and Robert Motherwell.

Artworks from the Martha Jackson Collection were exhibited at the National Museum of American Art in 1985. The show featured 127 paintings and sculptures by Americans in Jackson's collection, including works by Joan Mitchell, Grace Hartigan, Frank Lobdell, Michael Goldberg, John Hultberg, Eldzier Cortor, Marisol, Sam Francis, James Brooks, Julian Stanczak, and Alex Katz's sets for Kenneth Koch's 1962 play, "George Washington Crossing the Delaware." All of the works in the exhibition had been donated to the museum in 1980 by Jackson's son, David Anderson.

Prints from Martha Jackson's collection were exhibited in "Martha Jackson Graphics" at the University of Buffalo Anderson Gallery in 2015.

In 2021 the Hollis Taggart gallery presented the exhibit Wild and Brilliant: The Martha Jackson Gallery and Post-War Art. The exhibition was organized by independent curator Jillian Russo, accompanied by an eponymous essay and catalog.

Martha Jackson is portrayed in the 2022 Geraldine Brooks best seller historic novel, Horse, based upon the life of the race horse Lexington.
