= Bob Evermon =

Canadian artist

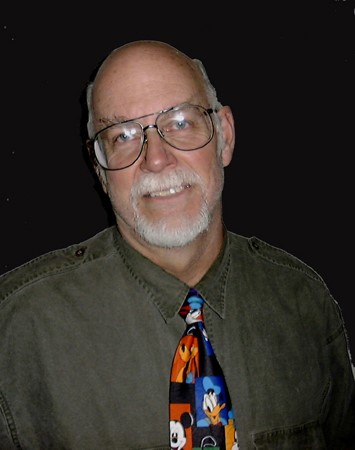
- Born: April 24, 1941 (age 85); Lohrville, Iowa
- Occupations: Studio artist and academic

Academic background
- Education: University of New Mexico
- Website: http://www.evermon.4mg.com

Bob Evermon is a studio artist and academic. He is a Professor Emeritus at Emily Carr University of Art and Design.

== Education ==
Evermon received his BFA from the Minneapolis College of Art. He did his master's from the University of New Mexico, Albuquerque, New Mexico and did a workshop for Master printer-in Lithography from Tamarind Lithography, Hollywood, Ca.

== Career ==
Evermon started his academic career as an assistant printmaking instructor at The Minneapolis College of Art (now called Minneapolis College of Art and Design) in 1963 and became the assistant in printmaking at the summer school there in 1964. At the University of New Mexico, he was a graduate assistant in printmaking from 1964 to 1965. He was a printer and did research at Tamarind Lithography Workshop Inc in Hollywood, California in 1965 while he was also an instructor of printmaking at the University of California, Long Beach. From 1969 to 1970, he was an assistant professor of art at the Nova Scotia College of Art and Design. After that, he was appointed the head of the printmaking department and a full professor at the Cranbrook Academy of Art, Bloomfield Hills in Michigan. In 1973, he became a full professor, teaching in the fine arts department at the Emily Carr University of Art and Design for over 30 years. He was a professor in Lithography at Banff Center summer school in Alberta from 1976 to 1978. Since 2018, he has been Professor Emeritus at Emily Carr University of Art and Design.

In 1976, Evermon became the first president and co-founder of Malaspina Printmakers Society in Vancouver and in 2010, he served on the Art, Culture and Heritage Advisory Committee to the District of Sechelt, after which he retired to his studio in Davis Bay. He has also been a guest artist at the University of Alberta, University of Alaska, Nova Scotia College of Art, University of Washington and the University of Saskatchewan.

== Works ==
Evermon's work is focused on fine art hand printing stone lithography, and his work has been exhibited in both solo shows and group shows and is also included in numerous private and public collections. His work is in the permanent collection at the Museum of Modern Art, Walker Art Center, the Minneapolis Institute of Art, the University of New Mexico, Tamarind Lithography Workshop, Iran Modern Art Gallery, Art Gallery of Greater Victoria, Canada Art Bank Collection, Smithsonian Institution, the 2012 permanent collection at the Norton Simon Museum, Minneapolis College of Art, the Museum of Fine Arts, Houston, and Minnesota Mining and Manufacturing Company. He has a book out on his Art called, Visual Poetry of the Kilauea Volcano.

Evermon takes inspiration from simple structures, like the Kilauea Volcano and presents them as visually complete works of arts. His sculptures and prints are hand formed and have been inspired by the use of line in nature.

== Exhibitions ==
- Pele, Art Fluent Art Gallery, Boston Mass (2022)
- Pele Form, Las Laguna Art Gallery, Laguna Beach, California (2022)
- Kilauea Messenger, Vestige Concept Gallery, Pittsburgh Penn. (2022)
- Martha Jackson Gallery, New York City
- California Palace of the Legion of Honor, San Francisco
- Imprint, Toronto Art Museum
- Imprint, Equinox Gallery
- Downey Art Museum
- Father and Son, Blanden Art Gallery, Iowa
- Bau-Xi Gallery, Vancouver
- Five Out Of Five, Pendulum Gallery, Vancouver
- The Backroom Gallery
- Richmond Art Gallery BC, Canada
- California Society of Etchers, 50th Anniversary Exhibition
- Joslyn Art Museum, Omaha, Nebraska-Seventh Midwest Biennial
- Capp Towers Art Gallery
- Ultimate Concerns, The fifth National Exhibit, Ohio University Gallery, Athens
- Bradley University Print Show, Peoria, Illinois
- 1st National Print Exhibition, Western Michigan University, Kalamazoo
- National Print Exhibition, Smithsonian Institution, Washington
- National Exhibition of prints and Drawings, Cowles Myles Collier Art Galleries, Wesleyan College
- 32nd National Graphic Arts and Drawing Exhibition, Wichita Arts Association
- Mid-America Annual Exhibition, Nelson Gallery of Art and Atkins Museum, Kansas City
- Fifth National Print and Drawing Exhibition, Olivet College Festival of Fine Arts
- California Society of Etchers, 50th Anniversary Exhibition, Lytton Center of the Visual Arts, Los Angeles
- Invitational St. Cloud State College, Headley Hall Gallery
- International 36th and 39th Northwest Printmakers Seattle and Portland art museums
- 1st Hawaiian National Print Exhibition, Honolulu Academy of Arts
- Passionate Vision-Gibson Public Art Gallery

== Awards and honors ==
- 1963 - First place in printmaking, the Third Minnesota Artists' Biennial at the Minneapolis Institute of Art
- Retrospective, Burnaby Art Gallery, Burnaby BC
- 1968 - Purchase Award, The Last Poet #2, National Print Exhibition at Wesleyan College Macon, Georgia
- 1968 - Purchase Award, Palomar College Drawing and Printmaking Exhibition
- 1971 - Purchase Award, 1st and 4th Annual National Print Exhibition, San Diego State College
- Purchase Award, Olivet College
- Purchase Award, Ninth North Dakota Annual Art Exhibition, University of North Dakota
