= Sonia Gechtoff =

American artist (1925–2018)

- Born: Sonia Alice Gechtoff; September 25, 1926; Philadelphia, Pennsylvania, U.S.
- Died: February 1, 2018 (aged 91); New York City, U.S.
- Education: San Francisco Art Institute; Pennsylvania Academy of the Fine Arts
- Known for: Painting
- Movement: Abstract Expressionism
- Spouse: James Kelly (1953-2003; his death)
- Children: 2

Sonia Gechtoff (September 25, 1926 – February 1, 2018) was an American abstract expressionist painter. Her primary medium was painting, but she also created drawings and prints.

== Early life and education ==
Sonia Gechtoff was born in Philadelphia to Ethel "Etya" and Leonid Gechtoff. Her mother managed art galleries, including her own East and West gallery located at 3108 Fillmore Street in San Francisco. Her father was a highly successful genre artist from Odesa, Ukraine. He introduced his daughter to painting and "had [her] sit beside him at his easel with a brush and paints and beginning at age six he was there to spur [her] on".

Gechtoff's talent was recognized early and she was put in a succession of schools and classes for artistically gifted children. She graduated from the Pennsylvania Academy of the Fine Arts with a B.F.A. in 1950.

== Career ==
In 1951, Gechtoff relocated to San Francisco, sharing her social and professional life with Bay Area artists such as Hassel Smith, Philip Roeber, Madeline Dimond, Ernest Briggs, Elmer Bischoff, Byron McClintock, and Deborah Remington. She was immersed in the heady culture of the San Francisco Bay Area Beat Generation. According to Gechtoff, female abstract expressionists in San Francisco (such as Jay DeFeo, Joan Brown, Deborah Remington, and Lilly Fenichel) did not face the same discrimination as their New York counterparts. After moving she studied lithography with James Budd Dixon at what is now called the San Francisco Art Institute. She rapidly shifted to work as an Abstract Expressionist. Some of her most well-known artwork was done in the Bay Area, including the lyrical Etya which is in the Oakland Museum of California.

Gechtoff married James "Jim" Kelly, another noted Bay Area artist, in 1953.

She gained national recognition in 1954, when her work was exhibited in the Guggenheim Museum's Younger American Painters show alongside Willem de Kooning, Franz Kline, Robert Motherwell, and Jackson Pollock.

Shortly after her mother died in 1958, Gechtoff and Kelly moved to New York, where they immediately became a part of the New York art world. She was represented by major New York galleries, among which were Poindexter and Gruenebaum, receiving consistently excellent reviews for her work. Teaching appointments and visiting professorships to New York University, Adelphi University, Art Institute of Chicago and the National Academy Museum and School, among others, were part of her professional life.

== Aesthetics ==
As a teenager, Gechtoff was heavily influenced by Ben Shahn's style of social realism^{[5]}, an international political and social movement that drew attention to the struggles of the working class and the poor.

Gechtoff cited Clyfford Still's influence on her style (whom she met through her friend Ernie Briggs, but with whom she never studied). She took important lessons about line and shape from Still's work, and is sometimes referred to as a "second-generation Abstract Expressionist".

Her distinctive style emerged in the early 1950s: bright, bold works on "big" canvases. Many of her works, like The Angel (1953–55), are abstracted self-portraits. Gechtoff used vibrant colors and thick, energetic brushstrokes to suggest a central figure whose arms stretch across the picture plane. In 1956 she inaugurated her complex "hair" drawings, masses of lines that tangled into wispy shapes that float on the paper. Her bold, swirling compositions won her a place in the United States Pavilion at the Brussels World's Fair in 1958.

Later in her career, after moving to New York, Gechtoff began drawing inspiration from the Brooklyn Bridge, classical architecture, and the sea, whose forms are recognizable in her later series of collage-like paintings. Gechtoff continued to develop her work throughout her career, never staying with one style. Always abstract, her work began to incorporate graphite after a switch to acrylics from oil. The result has given a sense of linear rhythm to her work. She also developed an interest in doing a series of work on a theme as well as sets, multiple canvases comprising a single complete work. One of her final sets of works is the six-canvas series "Skip's Garden".

According to Charles Dean, whose collection of Abstract Expressionist prints was acquired by the Library of Congress, Gechtoff was "the most prominent woman working in California in the '50s".

In 1993, Gechtoff was elected to the National Academy of Design. Gechtoff was also the recipient of the 2013 Lee Krasner Lifetime Achievement Award.

Gechtoff's work was included in the 1954 exhibition Younger American Painters at the Guggenheim, the 1958 Brussels World Fair, USA Pavilion, "17 American Painters", the 1977 Museum of Modern Art exhibition "Extraordinary Women', and the 2016 exhibit "Women of Abstract Expressionism" at the Denver Art Museum,

In 2023 her work was included in the exhibition Action, Gesture, Paint: Women Artists and Global Abstraction 1940-1970 at the Whitechapel Gallery in London.

== Solo Exhibitions ==
Year	Gallery	Place
1993, 1991	University Center Gallery, Adelphi University	New York, NY
1992, 1990	Kraushaar Galleries	New York, NY
1989, 1984	Witkin Galleries	New York, NY
1987; 1985; 1983; 1982; 1980; 1979	Gruenebaum Gallery	New York, NY
1978, 1976	Gloria Cortella Gallery	New York, NY
1974	Gallery One, Montclair State College	Montclair, NJ
1966, 1963	East Hampton Gallery	New York, NY
1960, 1959	Poindexter Gallery	New York, NY
1959, 1957	Ferus Gallery	Los Angeles, CA
1957	De Young Museum	San Francisco, CA
1955	Six Gallery	San Francisco, CA
1952	Labaudt Gallery	San Francisco, CA

== Group Exhibitions ==
Year	Name of Exhibition	Gallery	Place
1994	Directions in American Abstraction: A New Decade	Southern Alleghenies Museum of Art	Loretto, PA
1993	Paper Trails: San Francisco Abstract Expressionist Prints, Drawings, and Watercolors	The Art Museum of Santa Cruz County	Santa Cruz, CA
1992	56th Annual National Midyear Exhibition	The Butler Institute of American Art	Youngstown, OH
1991	Out of Abstract Expressionism	Schick Art Gallery, Skidmore College	Saratoga Springs, NY
1990	79th Annual Exhibition	Maier Museum of Art, Randolph-Macon Woman's College	Lynchburg, VA
1989	Abstract Painting of the Fifties	871 Gallery	San Francisco, CA
1987	Paper Now	Weatherspoon Gallery, University of North Carolina at Chapel Hill	Chapel Hill, NC
1987	Selections-Works on Paper	California Palace of the Legion of Honor	San Francisco, CA
1985-1986	American Art - American Women	Organized by Stamford Museum	Stamford, CT
1985	Cross Overs	Usdan Gallery, Bennington College	Bennington, VT
1983	Directions in Bay Area-A Survey of Three Decades, 1940s-1960s	Richard L. Nelson Gallery	Davis, CA
1981	New Dimensions in Drawing, 1950-1980	Aldrich Museum of Contemporary Art	Ridgefield, CT
1977	American Drawn & Matched	Museum of Modern Art	New York, NY

== Public collections ==
- Metropolitan Museum of Art, New York, New York
- San Francisco Museum of Modern Art, San Francisco, California
- Museum of Modern Art, New York, New York
- Whitney Museum, New York, New York
- Menil Collection, Houston, Texas
