= Norman Carton =

American artist and educator

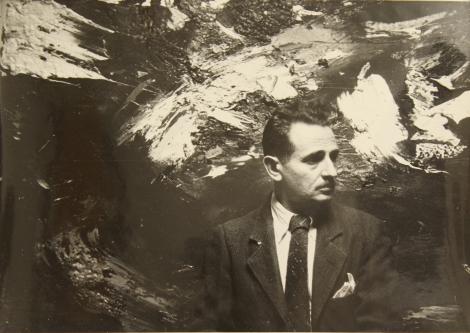
- Carton c. 1959
- Born: January 7, 1908; Russian Empire
- Died: February 14, 1980 (aged 72); New York City
- Known for: Painting, art education
- Movement: Abstract expressionism

Norman Carton (January 7, 1908 – February 14, 1980) was an American artist and educator known for abstract expressionist art. He was born in Ukraine, at the time part of the Russian Empire and moved to the United States in 1922 where he spent most of his adult life.

A classically trained portrait and landscape artist, Carton also worked as a drafter, newspaper illustrator, muralist, theater set designer, photographer, and fabric designer and spent most of his mature life as an art educator. Carton showed in and continues to be shown in many solo and group exhibitions. His work is included in numerous museums and private collections throughout the world.

== Early life ==
Norman Carton was born in the Dnieper Ukraine territory of the Russian Empire in 1908. Escaping the turbulence of civil war massacres, he settled in Philadelphia in 1922 after years of constant flight.

While attending the Pennsylvania Museum School of Industrial Art, Carton worked as a newspaper artist for the Philadelphia Record from 1928 to 1930 in the company of other illustrator/artists who had founded the Ashcan School, the beginnings of modern American art. From 1930 to 1935, he studied at the Pennsylvania Academy of Fine Arts under Henry McCarter, who was a pupil of Toulouse-Lautrec, Puvis de Chavanne, and Thomas Eakins. Arthur Carles, especially with his sense of color, and the architect John Harbison also provided tutelage and inspiration. Following his time at the Pennsylvania Academy of Fine Arts, Carton studied at the Barnes Foundation from 1935 to 1936 where he was mentored by John Dewey, Bertrand Russell, and again Carles as well as had daily access to Albert C. Barnes and his art collection.

Carton was awarded the Cresson Traveling Scholarship in 1934 which allowed him to travel through Europe and study in Paris. There he expanded his artistic horizons with influences stemming from Matisse, Picasso, Soutine, and Kandinsky. While at the Pennsylvania Academy of Fine Arts, Carton was also awarded the Toppan Prize for figure painting as well as the Thouron Composition Prize. He received numerous commissions as a portrait artist, social realist, sculptor, and theatrical stage designer as well as academic scholarships. During this time, Carton worked as a scenery designer at Sparks Scenic Studios, a drafter at the Philadelphia Enameling Works, and a fine art lithographer.

== Career ==
=== Early career ===
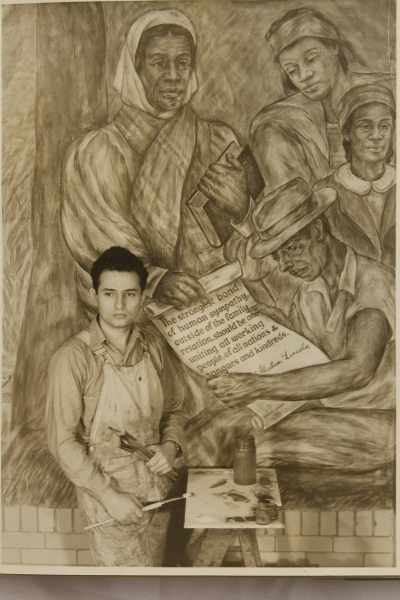
Carton painting a Works Progress Administration mural section of Sojourner Truth, 1940

From 1939 to 1942, the Works Progress Administration (WPA) Federal Art Project employed Carton as a muralist and easel artist. The WPA commissioned Carton to paint major murals at the Helen Fleischer Vocational School for Girls in Philadelphia, the Officers’ Club at Camp Meade Army Base in Maryland, and in the city of Hidalgo, Mexico.

Throughout the 1940s, Carton exhibited and won prizes for his semi-abstract Expressionist and Surrealist paintings at the Phillips, Corcoran, Carnegie Institute among other renowned institutions. He socialized with and was inspired by Émile Gaugin and Fernand Léger. He was a regular supporter and participant in exhibitions at the Pyramid Club, Philadelphia's leading African-American social club. He was the Founder and first President of the Philadelphia chapter of the Artists Union and later Artist's Equity Association.

During World War II, Carton was a naval structural designer and draftsman at the Cramps Shipbuilding Corporation in Camden, New Jersey. Here, he created non-objective sculpture with metal and collaborated with architects George Howe and Paul Philippe Cret.

After the war, Carton co-founded a fabric design plant in Philadelphia. He produced hand-printed fabrics for interiors and fashion that were featured in Harper's Bazaar, Vogue and Women's Wear Daily. Original fabric designs were commissioned by notable clients including Lord & Taylor, Gimbels, and Nina Ricci. Some of these designs are at the Metropolitan Museum of Art. Carton traded his partnership in the fabric design company in 1949 to focus full-time on painting.

Carton had his first solo exhibition in 1949 at the Philadelphia Art Alliance. This show was followed closely by solo exhibitions at the Laurel Gallery (New York City) and Dubin Gallery (Philadelphia). At this time, his exhibited work was abstract impressionist. In addition to painting, he taught classes at the Philadelphia Museum of Art.

The Philadelphia Museum of Art and the organization of the National Museums of France commissioned Carton to travel to Europe, mainly France, in 1950 for a color photography study of continental masterpieces. He was granted access to study the restoration of the Mona Lisa and was one of the very few to be given permission to remove the painting from its frame.

During his three-year stay in Paris, he had solo exhibits at La Sorbonne and Gallery Rene Breteau and was in 15 group shows in Paris salons including Les Surindependants, Salon d’Automne, Realities Nouvelles, and Musee d’Art Juif. The Cercle Paul Valery twice sponsored Carton to present lectures at the Sorbonne. He conducted seminars at the Louvre for the Cercle Esthetique Internationale and taught classes in and directed stage and costume design for the Theatre de Recherche at the Paris Opera. He studied with Jacques Villon and Léger again. Among his Paris artist colleagues were Chana Orloff, Earl Kerkam, Sam Francis, Claire Falkenstein, Lawrence Calcagno, Norman Bluhm, and Al Held.

=== Maturing career ===
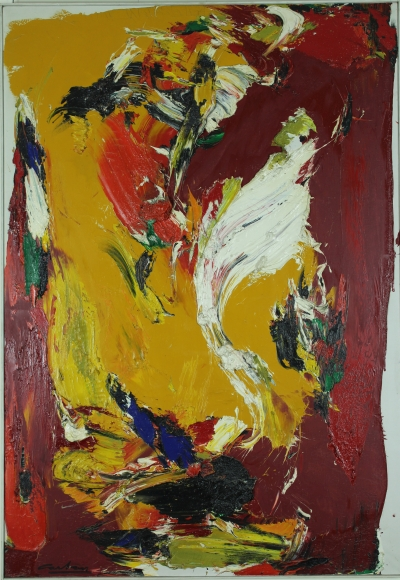
Jazz Light, c. 1959, 72" × 50", oil on canvas

When Carton returned to the United States in 1953, he settled in New York City where he worked in the company of the leading artists of the day with whom he appeared in a number of group shows including the Whitney Museum of American Art's 1955–1956 "Exhibit of Contemporary American Painting." This exhibition included such notable artists as Richard Diebenkorn, Joan Mitchell, James Brooks, Grace Hartigan, Franz Kline, Georgia O'Keeffe, Adolph Gottlieb, Robert De Niro Sr., and many others. The Whitney subsequently purchased a Carton.

The mid-1950s to the 1970s was a busy time for Carton during which he received a great deal of recognition. He had solo exhibitions one gallery after another: Martha Jackson, Staempfli, Granite and World House in New York City; Tirca Carlis, Provincetown; Gres, Washington D.C.; and Joachim, Chicago.

Carton's large canvasses traveled in major collections to such venues as the Smithsonian American Art Museum (was SNCFA) and the RISD Museum of Fine Arts with significant works of artists such as Jim Dine, Hans Hofmann, Robert Motherwell, Louise Nevelson, and Jackson Pollock. Other group exhibitions included Corcoran, Dallas Museum of Art, Dayton Art Institute, Detroit Institute of Arts, Walker Arts Center, Carnegie, Albright-Knox, and Chrysler Museums.

Among his NYC artist colleagues were also now Louise Nevelson and John Hultberg who he had helped welcome at the Martha Jackson Gallery. In 1962, with the aid of two other artists, he formed the Dewey Gallery, one of the first New York City galleries owned and operated by artists. He presented his work during the opening exhibition.

During his lifetime, Carton was in 180 group exhibits and more than 25 solo shows and continued to receive PAFA fellowship awards. He was regarded as possessing a painterly style of superlative action and a unique knowledge as a colorist, Carton ground his own pigments and painted with a palette. More recently, he exhibited with Willem de Kooning and Mark Rothko among other great Abstract Expressionists as well as Picasso and Matisse.

=== Art educator ===
Norman Carton was also an art educator throughout much of his life. Beginning in 1960, Carton worked on the art faculty at the New School where he would remain until his death. From 1948 to 1949, he taught painting and composition at the Philadelphia Museum of Art. From 1950 to 1953, he conducted seminars at the Louvre and the Sorbonne while living in Paris. Also while in Paris, Carton taught classes in and directed stage and costume design for the Theatre de Recherche at the Paris Opera. He also gave lectures at the Pratt Institute and the Chrysler Museum of Art as well as the Whitney Museum of American Art. Carton moderated panel discussions between prominent artists and educators and appeared in radio interviews. In 1960 and 1961, he painted at the MacDowell Colony in New Hampshire as a fellow. Carton also taught for a time at Long Island University.

== Personal life ==
Norman Carton had two children, sons Jacob and Benedict Carton. He died of a heart attack at Doctors Hospital in New York City in 1980 at the age of 72.

== Legacy ==
Norman Carton has had more than 30 solo exhibitions and was part of over 225 group exhibitions. His work is currently in more than 20 museums and hundreds of private collections throughout the world.

Carton's works continue to be included in present day exhibitions including at Hollis Taggart Gallery entitled Norman Carton Chromatic Brilliance, Insider's Select, Paintings from the 1940s–60s and Wild and Brilliant:The Martha Jackson Gallery and Post-War Art; Quogue Gallery entitled 1950s and 1960s Works on Paper, the Nassau County Museum of Art entitled Blue in 2020 as well as Energy: The Power of Art in 2019 and at the Anita Shapolsky Gallery in 2019 entitled Inspiration & Exploration.

Art & Antiques May/June 2024 magazine cover and spotlight article by William Corwin featured Norman Carton's history and art. In 2023, Hollis Taggart Gallery published a 120 page monograph on Norman Carton art on the occasion of his first 21st century New York City solo exhibition. Norman Carton's 2020 solo exhibition at Quogue Gallery was reviewed by Charles A Riley II

A representational portion of Carton's papers which include correspondence, writings, notes, exhibition catalogs and sketchbooks were donated to the Smithsonian Archives of American Art where they remain.

== Selected museum collections ==
Many museums hold Norman Carton's works in their permanent collections. Below is a selected list of museums which hold Carton's works

- Albright–Knox Art Gallery, Buffalo, New York
- Blanton Museum of Art, University of Texas at Austin
- Chrysler Museum of Art, Norfolk VA
- Fonds National d'Art Contemporain / Center National d'Arts Plastiques, Paris
- Michelson Museum of Art, Marshall, Texas
- Montclair Art Museum, Montclair, New Jersey
- Moscow Conservatory, Moscow, Russia
- Musée d'art moderne (Saint-Étienne, France), 1954–1992
- Musée d'Art et d'Histoire du Judaïsme, Paris, France
- Museo Nacional de Bellas Artes de La Habana, Havana, Cuba
- Museum of Fine Arts, Budapest, Hungary
- National Gallery of Art, Washington, D.C.
- Neuberger Museum of Art, Purchase, New York
- Palmer Museum of Art, State College, Pennsylvania
- Pennsylvania Academy of the Fine Arts, Philadelphia, Pennsylvania
- Rhode Island School of Design Museum, Providence, Rhode Island
- The New School Art Collection, New York City
- Whitney Museum of American Art, New York City
- Yale University Art Gallery, New Haven, Connecticut
- Zimmerli Art Museum, Rutgers University, New Jersey

== Selected works ==
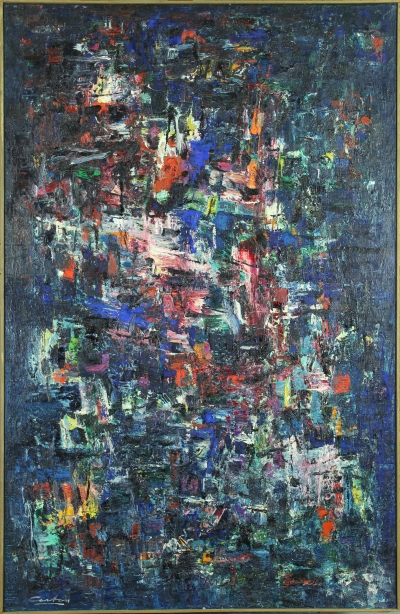
Manhattan Gothic, 1954, 54" × 35", oil on canvas

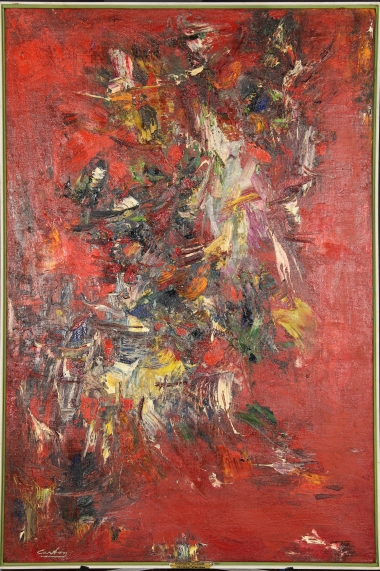
Evening Flame, 1955, 48" × 32", oil on canvas

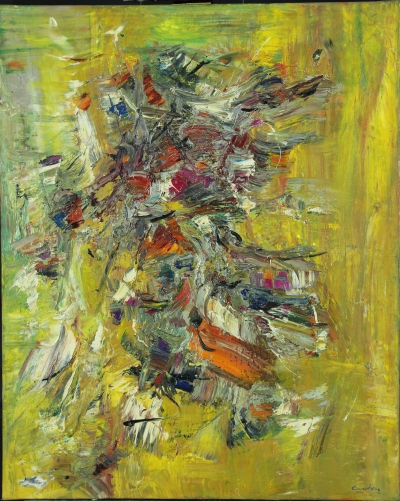
Pocatello Summer, 1955, 32" × 25.5", oil on canvas

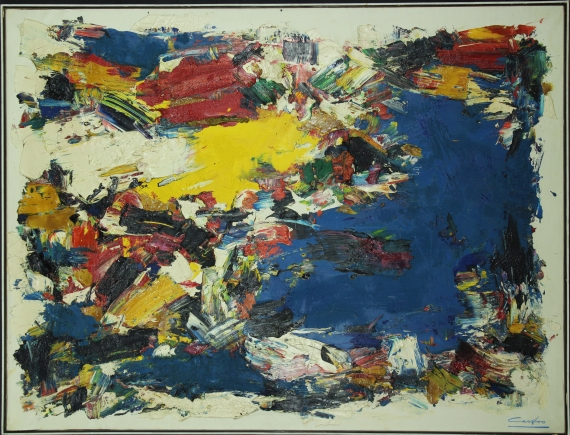
Regatta, 1957, 54" × 71", oil on canvas

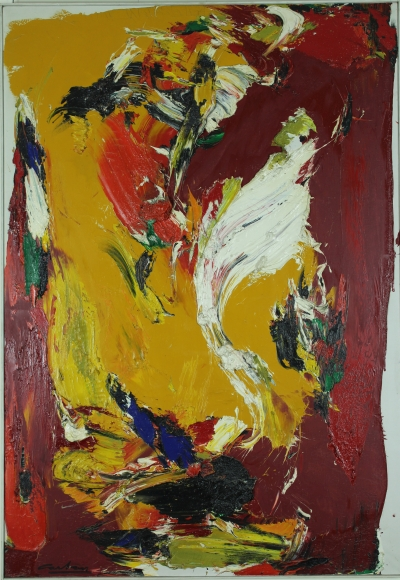
Jazz Light, c. 1959, 72" × 50", oil on canvas

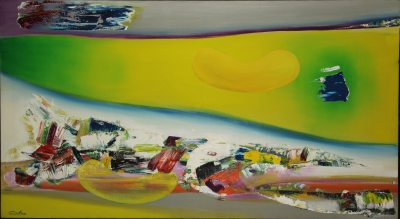
#1444, c. 1972, 36" × 66", oil on canvas

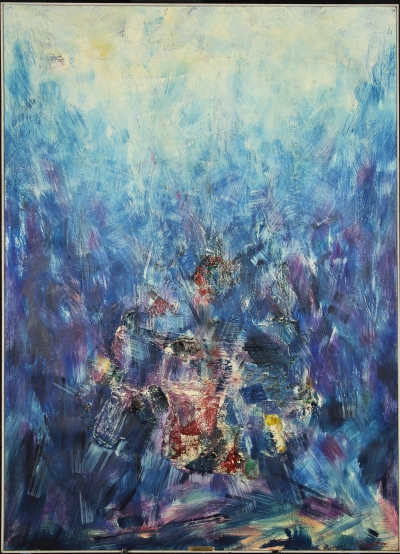
Summit-Winter Fountain, 64" × 46", oil on canvas, c1970s

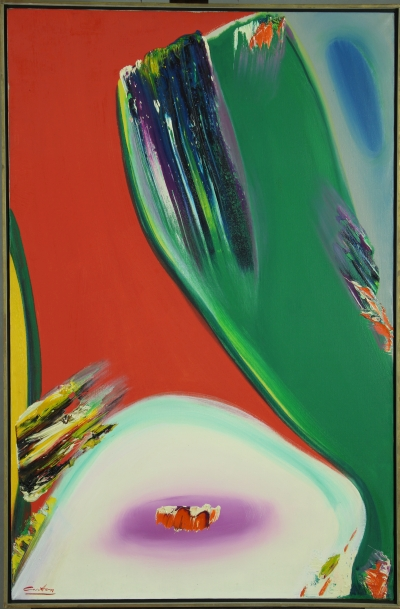
Scherzo, 40" × 26", oil on canvas, c1970s

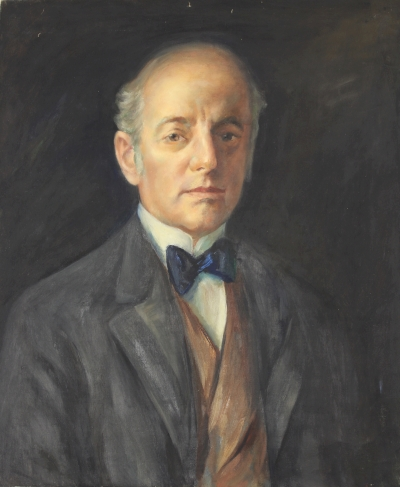
Portrait of John Cadwalader commissioned by the Philadelphia Athenaeum, c. 1930s, oil on canvas

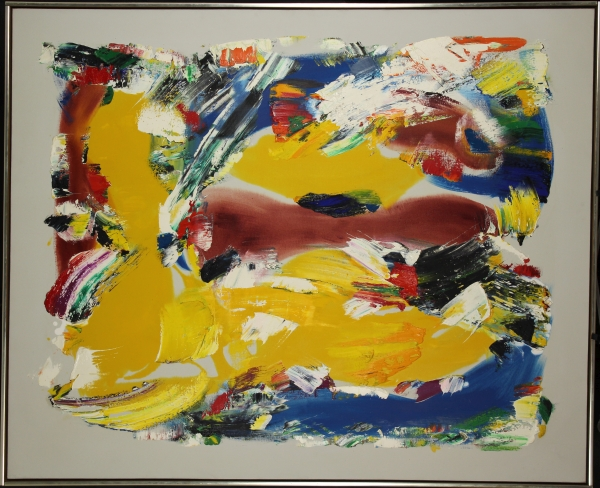
Passage, c. 1978, 57" × 70", oil on canvas
