= James Budd Dixon =

American painter (1900–1967)

James Budd Dixon (November 26, 1900 – December 1, 1967) was an American Abstract Expressionist painter and printmaker. He was a member of the "Sausalito Six" group of San Francisco Bay Area painters.

== Family and education ==
James Budd Dixon was born to a well-to-do family in San Francisco, California. In the 1920s, he studied art at the University of California, Berkeley, where he was an illustrator for several campus publications. He served in the Army Air Forces in World War II, after which he returned to studying art under the G.I. Bill, this time at the California School of Fine Arts (CSFA, now the San Francisco Art Institute). Among his classmates at CSFA were other emerging Bay Area Abstract Expressionists, including Richard Diebenkorn, John Hultberg, Frank Lobdell, Walter Kuhlman, and George Stillman. They became known as the "Sausalito Six" because most lived in the waterfront town of Sausalito just north of San Francisco (Dixon was one of those who did not, but he frequently met there with the others).

Throughout his life, Dixon supported himself in various ways, including as a commercial artist and an art director. In 1950 he became an instructor at CSFA; among his students there were Sonia Gechtoff, Byron McClintock, and Robert S. Neuman.

== Art career ==
Dixon was both a painter and a printmaker. In the 1930s, he painted in a Social Realist style, and it wasn't until his years as a student at CSFA that he developed his characteristic mature style, inspired by the early work of Jackson Pollock. These later paintings featured dramatic strokes of brilliant, harsh color laid on in heavy impasto, while his prints and drawings were energized by vigorous lines. One critic considered him the most adventurous colorist among the first wave of Abstract Expressionists to emerge from the Bay Area. In 1948 he collaborated with other members of the Sausalito Six to create a portfolio of 17 lithographs entitled Drawings that is considered a landmark in the history of Abstract Expressionist printmaking.

From the 1940s onwards, Dixon exhibited regularly at galleries and museums on the West Coast and occasionally elsewhere. His output became more sporadic after 1960 as a drinking problem accelerated, and he died in San Francisco in 1967. He is buried in Golden Gate National Cemetery next to his wife, Peggy Dixon (1892-1977).

Most of his work is in the collection of the Oakland Museum (California), but a few pieces are held by the Library of Congress and the Smithsonian American Art Museum, among other institutions. A small collection of papers, photographs, and slides of Dixon's work is held by the Archives of American Art.
