= Brookhaven Landfill Action and Remediation Group =

Brookhaven Landfill Action and Remediation Group (BLARG)
- Formation: 2020
- Founder: Hannah Thomas, Dennis Nix, Monique Fitzgerald
- Key people: Abena Asare, Kerim Odekon, and Michelle Mendez
- Website: https://www.landfillaction.org/

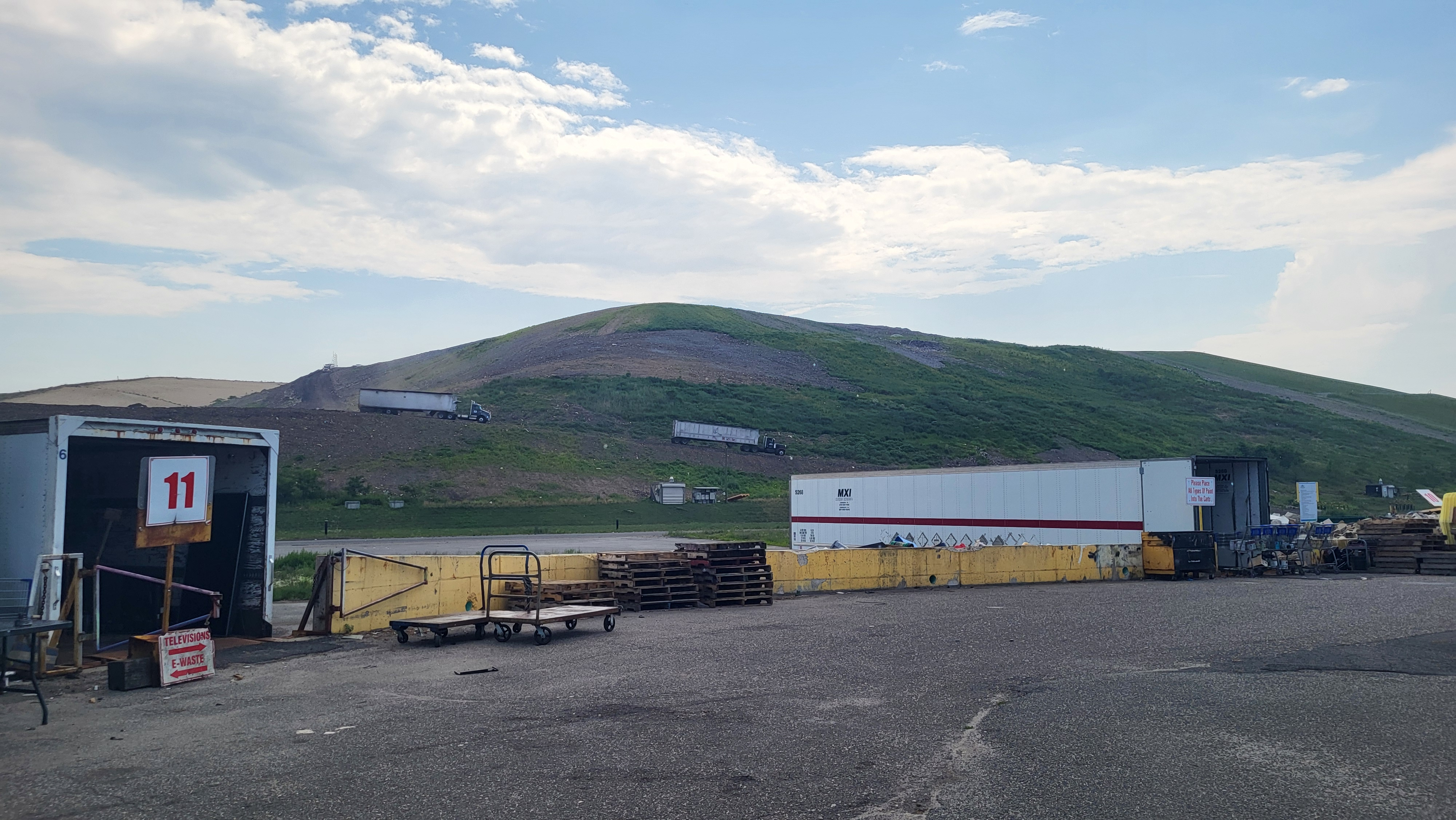
Brookhaven Town Landfill in 2026

The Brookhaven Landfill Action and Remediation Group (BLARG) is a New York based grassroots environmental justice organization, that advocates for the closure and remediation of the 140-acre Brookhaven Landfill. The group cites the landfill's negative environmental impact and placement within a predominantly black and Latino neighbourhood as reasons for its closeure.

North Bellport reportedly has the lowest life expectancy on Long Island and the second-highest rate of asthma in Suffolk County, a statistic that BLARG largely attributes to the town's proximity to the landfill. Approximately 720,000 tons of construction and demolition debris and 350,000 tons of incinerator ash from across Long Island are deposited annually at the Brookhaven Landfill.

A large portion of the incinerator ash deposited at Brookhaven Landfill comes from Reworld Hempstead, a nearby incinerator plant. In 2024, the facility was found in violation of state environmental laws from mishandling of ash waste.

The nearby Brookhaven National Laboratory was made an active Superfund site due to significant groundwater contamination.

== History ==
BLARG was co-founded by North Bellport community members, including Hannah Thomas, Dennis Nix, and Monique Fitzgerald. The group was established in 2020 following the murder of George Floyd, and the organization highlights the need to identify systemic issues contributing to premature deaths in Black communities.

=== Projects ===
In 2021, BLARG advocated against the expansion of Brookhaven Landfill, which was subsequently stopped.

In the summer of 2021, BLARG facilitated local residents transporting food waste by bicycle to community composting facilities and implemented compost education initiatives within the Long Island community.

In 2022, BLARG initiated a Community Composting Collective, diverting waste from Brookhaven Landfill and reducing the generation of methane gas emissions.

In 2023, BLARG advocated for State Attorney General Letitia James to investigate Covanta Hempstead, (later renamed Reworld Hempstead), a waste-to-energy plant owned by Covanta, regarding the potential hazardous nature of ash deposited into Brookhaven Landfill. This advocacy preceded a multi-year investigation of Covanta Hempstead by the New York Department of Environmental Conservation (NYSDEC).
