= Maurice L. Sindeband =

American electrical engineer

- Born: Maurice Leonard Sindeband; 1885; Russian Empire
- Died: December 5, 1971 (aged 85–86); New York City, U.S.
- Education: Columbia University
- Occupation(s): Electrical engineer, business executive
- Title: President of Ogden Corporation

Maurice Leonard Sindeband (1885 – December 5, 1971) was an American engineer, inventor, and business executive. He was a former president of the Ogden Corporation.

== Early life and education ==
Sindeband was born in 1885 in the Russian Empire and moved to the United States in 1890. He graduated from Columbia University with a degree in electrical engineering in 1907.

== Career ==
Sindeband began his career that year with the New York Central Railroad, before moving to the Edison Electric Illuminating Company, which he left in 1915 to join the American Gas and Electric Company, advancing to the post of electrical engineer in 1918. He worked on high-tension power transmission, career-current communication, and substation operation. An inventor, he was also credited for inventing an automatic train control system, an automatic reactor for electric power circuits, an electronic voltage regulator for generators, as well as carrier-current communication and short-circuit current-control systems.

Sindeband later worked for Brown, Boveri & Cie and became president, vice chairman, and director of Ogden Corporation. He was also a director of Avondale Shipyard and Syntex Corporation. He was also a fellow of the Institute of Electrical and Electronics Engineers.

== Death ==
Sideband died on December 5, 1971, at age 84, in New York City.
