= Walter Kuhlman =

American painter and printmaker (1918–2009)

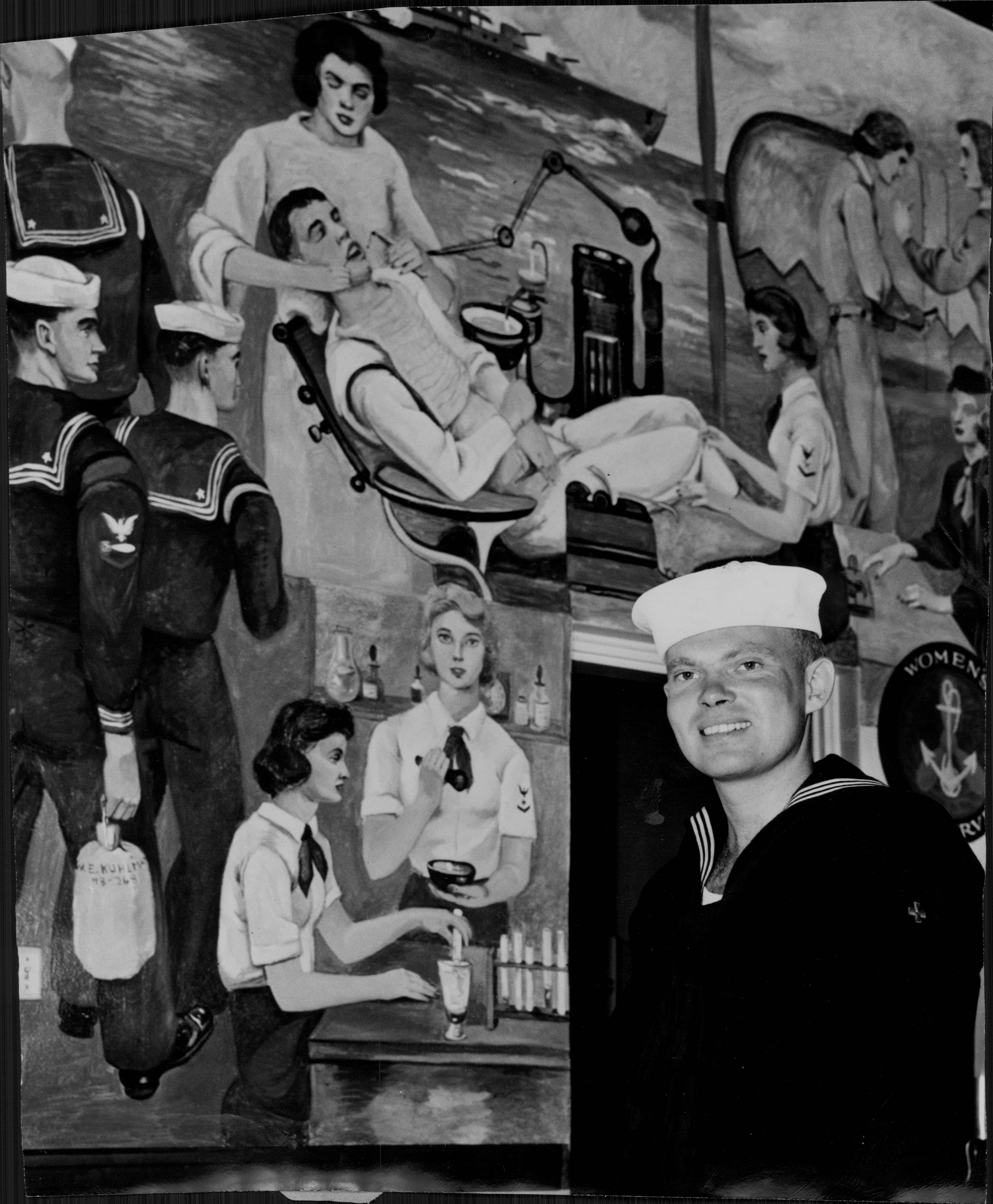
- Kuhlman, Hospital Apprentice Second Class, stands beside the mural he painted depicting jobs performed by WAVES at the San Diego Naval Training Station (1948)
- Born: Walter Egel Kuhlman; November 16, 1918; St. Paul, Minnesota
- Died: March 29, 2009 (aged 90); San Rafael, California
- Education: California School of Fine Arts (CSFA, 1947)
- Known for: Painting
- Movement: Abstract expressionism; Color Field; American Figurative Expressionism

Walter Kuhlman (1918–2009) was a 20th-century American painter and printmaker. In the late 1940s and 1950s, he was a core member of the San Francisco School of Abstract Expressionism. He later worked in a representational style related to American Figurative Expressionism.

== Biography ==
Walter Kuhlman was born in 1918 in St Paul, Minnesota to Peter and Marie Kuhlman, Danish immigrants. Part of his childhood was spent living with an aunt in Saeby, a coastal town in northern Denmark.

In 1936, Kuhlman enrolled at the St. Paul School of Art, where he studied with Cameron Booth (1892–1980), a modernist who had trained in Europe with André Lhote and Hans Hofmann. Kuhlman completed his studies at the St. Paul School in 1939, and then taught there. He was also enrolled at the University of Minnesota, from which he earned a bachelor's degree in 1941.

During World War II, Kuhlman was drafted into the U.S. Navy and assigned a position as a medical illustrator. He married his first wife, Nora, who was also in military service. After both were discharged in 1945, the couple lived briefly in New Orleans and the U.S. Virgin Islands.

Kuhlman enrolled at the California School of Fine Arts (CSFA) in 1947. (This is now the San Francisco Art Institute.) The CSFA faculty, notably Clyfford Still, encouraged an exploration of Abstract Expressionism and thus established San Francisco as a recognized center distinct from the New York School. Kuhlman was among the core group of San Francisco Abstract Expressionists.

At this time, Kuhlman became interested in printmaking. He joined five other artists associated with CSFA – Richard Diebenkorn, James Budd Dixon, John Hultberg, Frank Lobdell, and George Stillman – to create a portfolio of 17 lithographs. This 1948 portfolio, titled Drawings, has been acknowledged as a landmark in Abstract Expressionist printmaking. The group has been referred to as "The Sausalito Six," because most, including Kuhlman, lived in Sausalito, north of San Francisco. Kuhlman also produced important intaglio prints at CFSA.

The artist went to Paris in 1950, and he was among a group of Americans who exhibited in the 1951 Salon des réalités nouvelles (or "new realities"). It was among the first exhibitions in Europe to feature American Abstract Expressionism. Kuhlman was also included in a second Paris exhibition, Un art autre ("art of another kind"), curated by Michel Tapié.

Kuhlman returned to his home in Sausalito, and he continued his focus on Abstract Expressionist painting through the decade of the 1950s. While some early abstracts reveal experimentation with gestural abstraction, Kuhlman's later abstracts show an affinity for Color Field painting. His work was included in the United States exhibition at the 1955 International Biennial of São Paulo, Brazil. Kuhlman received a fellowship in 1957 from the Chicago-based Graham Foundation for Advanced Studies in the Fine Arts.

In 1960, Kuhlman became a member of the faculty of the University of New Mexico. At the same time, the artist became increasingly drawn away from Abstract Expressionism and toward figurative imagery. This figurative work can be enigmatic, often seeking to express subjective emotional and archetypal themes. Although this work is highly personal, it can be placed within the broad movement of American Figurative Expressionism.

Kuhlman left the University of New Mexico in 1965. After teaching stints at Stanford University and Santa Clara University, Kuhlman joined the faculty at Sonoma State University. The California Arts Council awarded him a Maestro Grant as an "Outstanding Artist and Teacher" in 1982. Kuhlman retired from teaching in 1988.

While teaching, and after his retirement, Kuhlman continued to paint and exhibit. He also became committed to monotype printmaking. Kuhlman continued to live in Sausalito, with his second wife, Tulip. He was elected to the National Academy of Design in 1995. His papers were accepted into the Smithsonian Institution's Archives of American Art.

The artist died in 2009.

== Public collections ==
The artist's paintings and prints are held by a number of public collections, including:

- British Museum
- Cleveland Museum of Art
- Fine Arts Museums of San Francisco
- Menil Collection
- Metropolitan Museum of Art
- Oakland Museum of California
- Phillips Collection
- San Francisco Museum of Modern Art
- Smithsonian Museum of American Art
- Worcester Museum of Art

== Sources / further reading ==
- Marika Herskovic, American Abstract Expressionism of the 1950s An Illustrated Survey, (New York School Press, 2003.) ISBN 0-9677994-1-4. pp. 198–201
- Acton, David. The Stamp of Impulse: Abstract Expressionist Prints. New York: Hudson Hills Press, 2001.
- Albright, Thomas. Art in the San Francisco Bay Area: 1945-1980. Berkeley: University of California Press, 1985.
- Landauer, Susan. The San Francisco School of Abstract Expressionism. Berkeley: University of California Press, 1996.
- McChesney, Mary. A Period of Exploration: San Francisco, 1945-1950. Oakland Museum of California, 1973.
