= John Hultberg =

American Abstract expressionist (1922–2005)

- Born: February 8, 1922; Berkeley, California
- Died: April 15, 2005 (aged 83); New York, New York
- Known for: Painter
- Movement: Abstract expressionism, Abstract realism
- Spouse: Lynne Mapp Drexler

John Hultberg (February 8, 1922 – April 15, 2005) was an American Abstract expressionist and Abstract realist painter. Early in his career he was related to the Bay Area Figurative Movement; he was also a lecturer and playwright.

== Early life and education ==
John Hultberg was born in 1922 in Berkeley, California. He had a sister, Helen, and brothers Paul Hultberg and Don.

Hultberg attended Fresno State College, graduating in 1943. During World War II, he was a Navy lieutenant. After the war, his education at the California School of Fine Arts (CSFA) (now the San Francisco Art Institute) was funded by the G.I. Bill. His teachers included Mark Rothko and Clyfford Still and he was a classmate of Richard Diebenkorn, who was also a mentor, James Budd Dixon, Walter Kuhlman, Frank Lobdell, and George Stillman, with whom he created a portfolio of 17 lithographs. This 1948 portfolio, titled Drawings, has been acknowledged as a landmark in Abstract Expressionist printmaking. The group has been referred to as "The Sausalito Six," because most, lived in Sausalito, north of San Francisco. He was also a contemporary of Clay Spohn and David Park. Hultberg studied at the Art Students League of New York beginning in 1952.

== Personal life ==
Hultberg was first married to Hilary Blech. In 1961 Hultberg met fellow artist Lynne Mapp Drexler at The Artist's Club in New York. Artists there discussed abstract expressionism. (Note: Several sources say that the couple was married in 1961. The New York Times obituary for Hultberg states that they were married in 1962.) Drexler and Hultberg were married and three years traveled and lived in Mexico, the West Coast and Hawaii. Then, they lived at New York's Chelsea Hotel in the late 1960s.

Seeking a relaxing environment, the couple bought a house off the coast of Maine on Monhegan Island in 1971 and split their time between New York City and Maine, particularly spending the summers at their island house. (Note: The Portland Museum says that Hultberg's dealer Martha Jackson bought a house on Monhegan Island for the couple in the early 1960s.)

By 1983, Drexler moved year-around and permanently near Lighthouse Hill on Monhegan Island, an artists' haven off the coast of Maine, where she had spent most summers since 1963. Hultberg did not like to live year-round, particularly during the harsh winters, at Monhegan Island and moved to Portland in 1985. He asked Drexler to come with him, but she decided to stay on the island. They were estranged at that time of her death, on December 30, 1999.

He died of complications of a stroke on April 15, 2005, at Roosevelt Hospital in New York. He lived on the Upper West Side of the city. He had a son named Carl R. Hultberg and Elaine Wechsler was his agent and partner.

== Career ==
Monhegan Island

At first, having been swept up by the natural beauty of the island, I found myself copying the landscape – something I had never done before. As time went on, I began to distill the spirit of the island into my 'invented' panoramas... The quality of swiftly changing light, atmospheric conditions, water patterns, as well as imagery inspired by the island – lobster boats, traps, ropes, kerosene lamps and the like – seeped into my paintings.

— John Hultberg

Hultberg primarily made Abstract expressionist paintings that were minimalist and dark, and also made Surrealist invented landscapes with "linear perspectives and angular shapes." Hultberg was described as an Abstract realism, who combines "abstract" and "concrete" with attention to detail, bold color use, and strong design.

In 1952 he was introduced at the Museum of Modern Art in a show of new artists. He lived for one year in Paris between 1954 and 1955 and gained a reputation there for his work. In 1955 he won the Corcoran Biennial first prize in Washington. In the mid to late 1950s, Hultberg, along with his colleague and friend Norman Carton, worked at and regularly exhibited at the Martha Jackson Gallery.

His paintings were influenced by his time spent at Monhegan Island, and his career thrived after he moved to Portland. His work was shown in many galleries, including the Anita Shapolsky Gallery in New York City and the Albright Art Gallery in Buffalo, New York, he gave lectures, and in 1985 he had an exhibition at the Portland Museum of Art.

A play that he wrote was produced the University of Maine theatre department. He published the book Sole Witness, Vagabondage, a Paris Odyssey (1953–1955), his poetry and other books. He taught art in Hawaii and the West Coast.

He was teaching at the Art Students League and was a full-time resident in New York by 1990. He taught until the week of his death at the Art Students League. His work was part of a group show at Aucocisco in Portland in February 2005, at which time he was living in New York City.

== Legacy ==
Mr. Hultberg made a name for himself in the 1950s with powerful landscapes, fractured into slabs under ominous horizons; multiplicities of bizarre, huddled shapes; and dense, semiabstract urban wastelands dappled with harsh brilliance and vague human touches. Their air of mystery and forceful use of color earned him awards at exhibitions that began in the 1950s and continued for five decades.

— Wolfgang Saxon, The New York Times

== Collections ==
His works are in the following collections:

- Guggenheim Museum, New York
- Metropolitan Museum of Art
- Museum of Modern Art, New York City, which has 20 of his works, all but one made in 1963.
- Portland Museum of Art, Maine
- Southern Alleghenies Museum of Art
- Whitney Museum of American Art
