= James Kelly (artist) =

American abstract expressionist artist (1913–2003)

- Born: James Alphonsus Kelly; December 19, 1913; Philadelphia, Pennsylvania, U.S.
- Died: 29 June 2003 (aged 89); New York City, New York, U.S.
- Education: School of Industrial Arts, California School of Fine Art, Barnes Foundation
- Known for: Painting, lithography
- Movement: Abstract Expressionism
- Spouse: Sonia Gechtoff (1953–2003; his death)
- Children: 2

James Alphonsus Kelly (December 19, 1913 – June 29, 2003) was an American abstract expressionist artist whose career spanned nearly seven decades. Primarily a painter, Kelly also created graphic work especially during his early years in San Francisco from 1950 to 1953.

== Biography ==
James Kelly was born in Philadelphia, the son of a shoe manufacturer.

He studied at the School of Industrial Arts (now University of the Arts (Philadelphia) in 1937, the Pennsylvania Academy of Art in 1938, at the Barnes Foundation in 1941 where he had a scholarship; and from 1951 to 1954, at the California School of Fine Art (now the San Francisco Art Institute).

He interrupted his art career by enlisting in the Air Force in World War II, serving in the Pacific repairing the ultra-secret Norden bombsight for Boeing B-24 planes for the entirety of the war. Returning to Philadelphia after being discharged, he continued painting while working at his father's shoe factory.

Kelly relocated to San Francisco in 1950 to join his friend, painter John Lynch, enrolling at the California School under the GI Bill. It was there that he produced several significant lithographic works. One of them, "Deep Blue I" from 1952, is considered a masterpiece by Charles Dean, whose Abstract Expressionist collection was acquired by the Library of Congress. Kelly has been categorized as a "second-generation" abstract expressionist.

In 1953 Kelly married painter Sonia Gechtoff; the couple became fixtures in the roiling art community of the day. He supplemented his artist's income with jobs as a museum preparator at the San Francisco Museum of Art, and as a bartender at The Place.

Soon after his mother-in-law Ethel died in 1958, Kelly and Gechtoff moved to New York City. He worked at Grove Press for several years, leaving to concentrate on his painting which continued uninterrupted for the rest of his career.

== Work ==
Kelly's work in Philadelphia was heavily geometric, reflecting the influence of the paintings by Mondrian which he saw at the Barnes Foundation.

In California he began working in the gestural, swirling style of Abstract Expressionism that was prevalent in San Francisco, and especially at the California School, at that time. He is sometimes referred to as an "action painter". His paintings, done in oil, were characterized by a heavy impasto.

Kelly switched to acrylic paint in the early 1970s, changing to a simplified geometric style comparable to some of the minimalist works popular at that time. He returned to oil paint and a gestural execution in the late 1970s. That combination formed the basis of his mature style which continued from the time he returned to it through the rest of his life.

== Public collections ==
- San Francisco Museum of Modern Art, San Francisco, California
- Museum of Modern Art, New York, New York
- Oakland Museum, Oakland, California
- Whitney Museum, New York, New York
- Menil Collection, Houston, Texas

== Group exhibitions ==
- King Ubu Gallery, San Francisco, 1953
- San Francisco Museum of Art, 1957, 1958, 1965
- Ferus Gallery, Los Angeles, 1958, 1959
- "California Painting and Sculpture: The Modern Era", Smithsonian Institution, 1977
- "The San Francisco School of Abstract Expressionism", San Francisco Museum of Modern Art, 1996

== Solo exhibitions ==
- San Francisco Art Association Gallery, 1956.
- Long Island University, Brooklyn, New York, 1968.
- Perlow Gallery, New York, 2006.
- David Findlay Jr., Gallery, New York, 2012.

== Selected awards ==
- Ford Foundation Fellowship, Tamarind Lithography, 1963
- National Endowment for the Arts Grant, 1977
- The Peter and Madeleine Martin Foundation for the Creative Arts, San Francisco, 1990
- Elected into the National Academy of Design, 1995
