= Reworld Hempstead =

Waste-to-energy plant on Long Island, New York

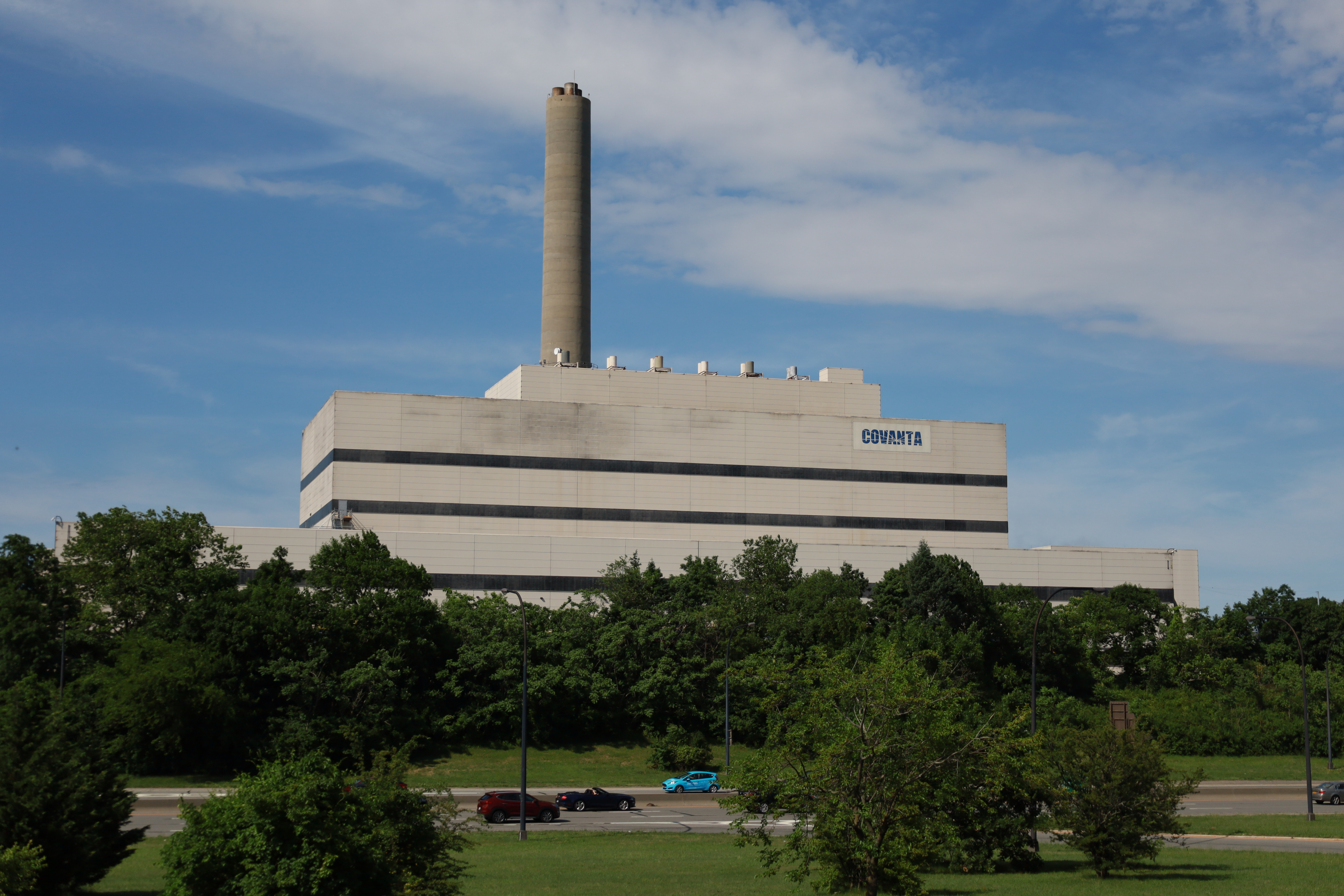
- The Reworld Hempstead plant towers over the Meadowbrook State Parkway in 2021
- Country: United States
- Location: Uniondale, New York
- Coordinates: 40°44′20″N 73°35′24″W
- Status: Operational
- Commission date: 1989; 37 years ago
- Operator: Reworld

Power generation
- Nameplate capacity: 78.6 MW
- Annual net output: 593.7 GW·h

External links
- Website: Official website

Reworld Hempstead, formerly Covanta Hempstead, is a waste-to-energy plant in Uniondale, New York operated by Reworld. It is the tallest structure in Nassau County, and the fourth largest power generation facility on Long Island by net energy generated.

The original plant on the site opened in 1979 on land formerly part of Mitchel Air Force Base. It used an untested wet refuse-derived fuel process, and operated only for about a year before it was shut down due to mechanical failures, labor and payment disputes, unpleasant odors that could be smelled two miles (3.2 km) away, and concerns about toxic emissions.

After the original operator defaulted on its bonds, the plant was sold, demolished, and rebuilt as a new plant using a traditional dry process, opening in 1989.

== Description ==
Reworld Hempstead is the fourth largest power generation facility on Long Island by net energy generated in 2020, behind Northport Power Station, Caithness Long Island Energy Center, and E. F. Barrett Power Station. However, it ranks thirteenth on Long Island by nameplate capacity. It consists of a single waste-to-energy unit. It is operated by Reworld, and the electricity generated at the plant is distributed across Long Island via the Long Island Power Authority's electrical transmission network.

Its 382-foot (116 m) smokestack is the tallest structure in Nassau County, and among the tallest on Long Island. It is an easily visible from the Meadowbrook State Parkway, which passes directly in front of it.

The facility has contracts with the Town of Hempstead, the Village of Garden City, and the Town of North Hempstead to incinerate their municipal solid waste. As of 2022, the plant produces 500–750 tons of incinerator bottom ash and fly ash each day, which is taken to the Town of Brookhaven landfill in North Bellport, New York.

== History ==
=== Background ===
In the early and mid-20th century, the land was the northeasternmost portion of Mitchel Air Force Base. It was cut off from the rest of the base by construction of the Meadowbrook State Parkway in the 1950s.

Beginning in 1967, the land was occupied by Topic House, a county-run drug rehabilitation center. Topic House was relocated to Plainview, New York, in 1978, and closed in 2003.

=== Original plant ===
The Hempstead Resource Recovery Plant in or before 1982

The first waste-to-energy plant on the site was the Hempstead Resource Recovery Plant. Al D'Amato, then Hempstead Town Supervisor and later U.S. Senator, was the driving force in getting it built. He was impressed by a demonstration project in Franklin, Ohio, by paper mill company Parsons & Whittemore. The design used a unique wet refuse-derived fuel process that mixed garbage with water and sent it through a hydropulper and a centrifuge to produce a paper-like fuel, with heavier components such as metals and glass being separated and recovered. It was the first operating plant built to use this process, and the first full-size plant built by the firm.

Construction was completed in August 1978, and the plant began operation in early 1979. It had two smokestacks that were 196 feet (60 m) high. However, the technology was untested, and the plant suffered from mechanical failures and emitted an unpleasant odor that was unbearable even two miles away, and reportedly caused shoppers at a nearby mall to vomit. In June 1979, employees went on strike due to the odor and other issues relating to poor working conditions. Another strike occurred that August.

Parsons & Whittemore suspended the plant's operations in March 1980 as part of a dispute with the Town of Hempstead over the installation of odor-reducing equipment and the payment of fees. The following month, the U.S. Environmental Protection Agency (EPA) reported that traces of dioxins and dioxin-like compounds had been found in the plant's emissions, for which it had not yet set permissible levels, preventing the plant from reopening. By 1982, EPA issued a memorandum on dioxin emissions, and discussions were underway to reopen the plant. However, Parsons & Whittemore defaulted on its bonds in 1983, and the decision was made to sell the plant to another operator and modify it from a wet to a dry process. Ultimately, the plant was demolished in 1987.

=== Current plant ===
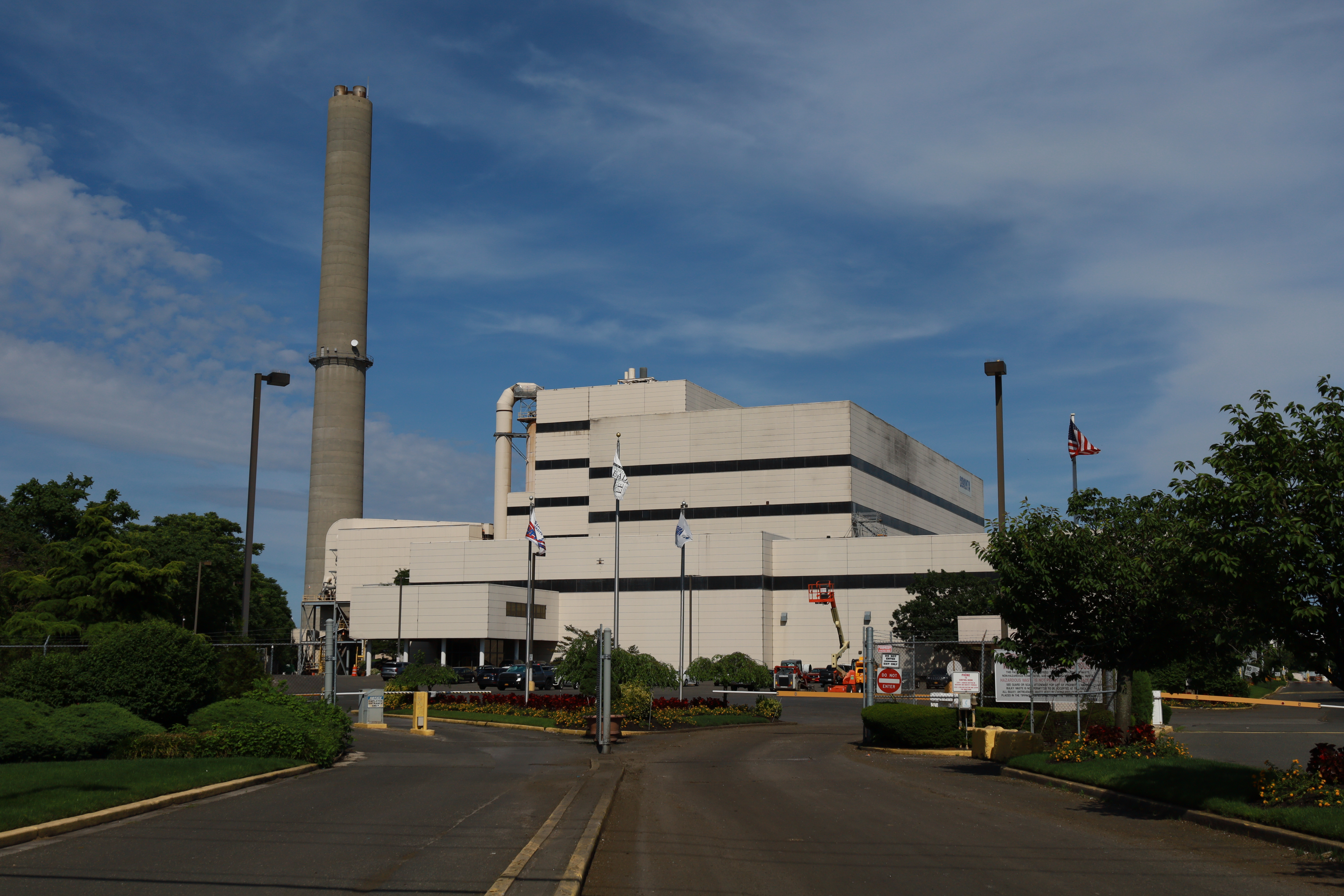
Side view of the plant in 2021

Construction of the new plant was motivated by a 1990 deadline by the New York Department of Environmental Conservation to close town landfills due to their threat to groundwater, the source of Long Island's drinking water. American Ref-Fuel won the contract to convert the plant to use a traditional dry process. The plant began operation in September 1989.

American Ref-Fuel also opened a plant in Babylon in 1989, and in Huntington in 1991. In 2005, American Ref-Fuel was sold to Covanta.

The plant smokestack's status as the tallest structure in Nassau County was called "ridiculous" in 2006 by then-Nassau County Executive Thomas Suozzi, an advocate for increased development in the vicinity such as The Lighthouse Project.

In 2013, a whistleblower case was filed by a former employee, Patrick Fahey, who stated that Covanta had failed to properly store and treat ash before disposal since 2006, in violation of federal and state environmental laws and potentially exposing the surrounding community to hazardous substances. Covanta denied the allegations, and LIPA, the Village of Garden City and the Town of Hempstead all declined involvement in the lawsuit, with Garden City stating that the whistleblower suit is without merit, and preferring to settle with Covanta.

In 2022, workers at nearby New York TRACON had complained about ash from the plant damaging their cars; this and other concerns led the Federal Aviation Administration to engage the Occupational Safety and Health Administration and the Centers for Disease Control and Prevention about potential impacts to worker health.

In 2024, the New York Department of Environmental Conservation (NYSDEC) found Covanta to be in violation of environmental state law after a multi-year investigation into ash management activities prompted by complaints from the Brookhaven Landfill Action and Remediation Group (BLARG). NYSDEC completed its review of documents submitted by Jenner & Block LLP related to the management of ash residue at Covanta Hempstead. These documents included Covanta's engineering calculations, instructions to the crane operator, residue/ash truck tracking log sheets, ash management plans, ash testing results, and various e-mail correspondence provided by the Covanta Hempstead's attorney as well as DEC’s historical files. It was noted that the ash sent out to the Ash Residue Management Plan (“ARMP”) for sampling and analysis was not representative of all ash sent out for disposal, and that the ash was in fact in violation of ash handling practices, posing possible toxic environmental threats to the Long Island community.

In April 2024, Covanta renamed itself to Reworld.
