= W. A. Case & Son Manufacturing Co. =

American plumbing fixture manufacturer

W. A. Case & Son Manufacturing

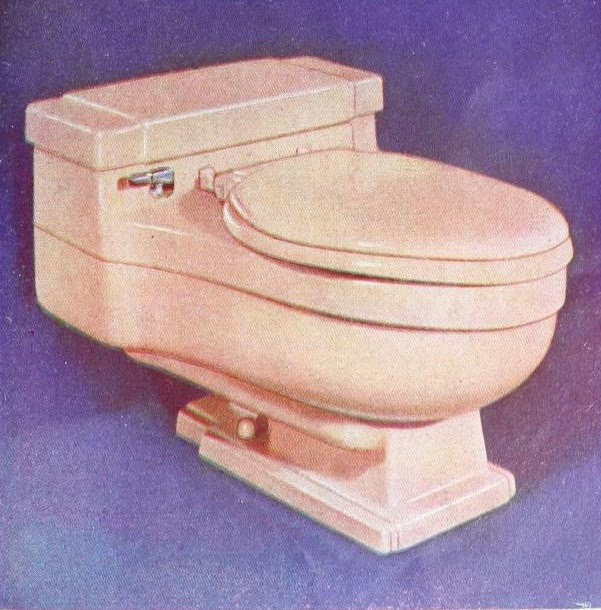
- Case 1000/1100, from an ad in House Beautiful, 1957
- Industry: Plumbing
- Founded: 1853; 172 years ago in Buffalo, New York, United States
- Founders: Whitney A. Case
- Defunct: December 31, 1969; 55 years ago
- Fate: Dissolved, defunct brand of Briggs Plumbing
- Successor: Case Plumbing Manufacturing Co.; Case Manufacturing Co.; Briggs-Case (brand)
- Headquarters: Buffalo, New York, United States of America
- Number of locations: 23 (1948)
- Key people: Whitney G. Case
- Products: Plumbing fixtures
- Owner: Ogden Corporation (1952–1964); Briggs Manufacturing Company (1964–1969)
- Number of employees: 2,000 (1948)

W. A. Case & Son Manufacturing, usually referred to by its wordmark Case, was an American manufacturer best known for its plumbing fixtures. Founded in 1853 by industrialist Whitney Asa Case, the company initially manufactured boilers, radiators, and ran a heavy coppersmithing shop for steamboats and locomotives. It was best known for its metalwork by the time of Whitney A. Case's death in 1892. His son and successor, Whitney G. Case expanded into the plumbing and household markets, and by 1910 the company had expanded to become the largest supplier of copper engineers’ and plumbers’ supplies in the United States.

== Overview ==
The company began producing porcelain toilets and sinks, from the 1910s through the 1920s with the acquisition of several other firms, including the business of James M. Teahen in 1917, and the Fred Adee Corporation in 1926, one of its largest wholesalers in Greater New York City. Teahen would go on to develop Case's toilet division, being the first company to produce a one-piece, "low boy" toilet, which incorporated all parts into the bowl/body rather than as a separate tank. The toilet was sold both under the Case brand as the "Model A", as well as the "T/N water closet", named for its inventor. These one-piece water closets were later popularized by Arts & Architecture for use in their Case Study Houses, (Note: "Case Study Houses" does not imply that their name is related to this company.) including Case Study House No. 1, as well as the Eames House. Although the company maintained a small pottery manufacturing plant in Detroit, on November 1, 1925, it would additionally acquire the Zwermann Company, a vitreous sanitary wares manufacturer in Robinson, Illinois, which would serve as the company's main pottery division. By the time of Whitney G. Case's death in 1948 the company had 20 offices around the country and 3 factories, in Norristown, Pennsylvania, Robinson, Illinois, and one in Boston, Massachusetts. It sold its products to more than 2,800 wholesale customers in the United States, Canada, Mexico, Australia and several countries in South America.

Logo for the Case line of fixtures after the company's dissolution into Briggs, after 1969

W. A. Case & Son was bought out by the Ogden Corporation, today known as COVANTA, in 1952. Up to that time Ogden had been considered solely an investment holdings corporation, but with its purchase of Case, the Securities Exchange Commission ruled it was considered a manufacturing company for regulatory purposes. Ogden maintained Case as a subsidiary known as the Case Plumbing Manufacturing Company until it was sold to Briggs Manufacturing in November 1964. Briggs consolidated its plumbing operations with Case, and by 1969 the company was dissolved a separate entity altogether, with Briggs retaining the name for some branding into the 1970s. Despite being defunct for more than 50 years, demand remains for Case fixtures and parts.
