= Byron McClintock =

American painter (1930–2022)

Byron McClintock (March 19, 1930 – March 31, 2022) was an American Abstract Expressionist painter and printmaker.

== Biography ==
Byron McClintock was born in Klamath Falls, Oregon on March 19, 1930, to and Eletha (Humphrey) McClintock and Robert McClintock. He grew up in Seattle, Washington, and joined the Merchant Marine in 1946. Three years later, he settled in San Francisco, where he took art classes at the California School of Fine Arts (now the San Francisco Art Institute). Among his teachers were Richard Diebenkorn, Edward Corbett, and James Budd Dixon. He developed his skill as a printmaker working as Dixon's assistant. At one point he shared a studio in the city with Ernest Briggs.

During the Korean War, McClintock served as an illustrator and instructor in the U.S. Army and was afterwards stationed in Alaska (1953–55). On his return to San Francisco, he became the co-owner of a commercial photoengraving business. In the 1980s, he left that business and got a job with the San Francisco Maritime Museum, where he had previously been a volunteer.

McClintock moved to Portland, Oregon, in 1997. He died at his home in Tigard, Oregon, on March 31, 2022, at the age of 92.

== Artwork ==
Although he has made a number of paintings, McClintock is best known for his prints, which range from lithographs to drypoint etchings and mezzotints. Highly abstract, with an atmospheric use of color, they yet offer "intimations of landscape". His work was included the Museum of Modern Art (New York)'s 1954 survey, "American Prints of the 20th Century," at which time he was credited, along with Will Barnet and Ralston Crawford, with helping to bring color lithography in America to a par with work being done in Europe. His work is in the collections of the Whitney Museum of American Art, the Museum of Modern Art (New York), and the Library of Congress, among others.
