= Lawrence Calcagno =

American painter (1913–1993)

- Born: March 23, 1913; San Francisco, California
- Died: April 28, 1993 (aged 80); State College, Pennsylvania, US
- Known for: Painting
- Movement: Abstract expressionism

Lawrence Calcagno (March 23, 1913 – April 28, 1993) was a San Francisco Bay area abstract expressionist painter.

He described his artistic motivation in the following words:

Painting was the one avenue through which I could find psychical tolerance and be released. My life has always been motivated not by intellectual or rational considerations but more by a subjective compulsion, by what I love.

== Biography ==
Lawrence Calcagno was born on March 23, 1913, in Potrero Hill, San Francisco. His parents, Vincent and Anna de Rosa Calcagno, were Italian immigrants. At age ten he moved to the family ranch-homestead in the Santa Lucia Mountains, Monterey County where he spent the following ten years. In 1935 he left the homestead, joined the merchant marines, and traveled all the way to Asia.

== Military service in World War II ==
In 1941 at the beginning of World War II Calcagno joined the United States Army Air Corps, where he served for three years. During his service he was recognized as an artist. His drawing titled "Watch in the Night" won first prize in the national Army art contest in the Southwest Regional competition.

== Journey to self discovery ==
Benefiting from the G.I. Bill in 1947, Lawrence Calcagno enrolled at the California School of Fine Arts, San Francisco. His teachers were Mark Rothko and Clyfford Still, along with instructors Edward Corbett and Richard Diebenkorn. In 1950 he left California School of Fine Arts for Europe. He went to Paris, France to study at L’Academie de la Grande Chaumiere. In 1951 he went to Florence to study the Renaissance. He enrolled at the Instituto d’Arte Statale.

== Teaching positions and Fellowships ==
In 1956 Calcagno accepted the position of assistant professor in the art department at the Albright Art School in the University at Buffalo, New York where he stayed until 1958. He went on to teach from 1958 to 1959 at the University of Illinois Urbana-Champaign. In 1960 he moved to New York and became a part-time instructor at New York University. In 1965 Calcagno became Andrew Mellon Professor in Painting at Carnegie Mellon University, in Pittsburgh, where he stayed until 1968. Calcagno was a fellow at the MacDowell and Yaddo artist colonies in 1960s.

== Selected solo exhibitions ==
- 1945: (first) The Little Gallery, New Orleans;
- 1948, 54: Lucien Labaudt Gallery, San Francisco;
- 1951–52: Numero Galleria d'Arte, Florence, Italy;
- 1952, 55: Studio Paul Facchetti, Paris, France;
- 1955: Galeria Clan, Madrid, Spain;
- 1955, 58, 60, 62: Martha Jackson Gallery, New York City;
- 1956: University of Alabama, Tuscaloosa; Howard College, Birmingham, Alabama; Macon Art Association, Macon, Georgia; Albright Art Gallery, The Buffalo Fine Arts Academy, New York;
- 1957: Instituto de Arte Contemporaneo, Lima, Peru;
- 1957, 62: Zuni Gallery, Buffalo, New York;
- 1958: Greenwich Gallery, NYC;
- 1959: Fairweather-Hardin Gallery, Chicago, Illinois;
- 1960: Philadelphia Art Alliance, Pennsylvania; New Arts Gallery, Houston; *1960, 61, 62, 64, Karlis Gallery, Provincetown, Massachusetts;
- 1961: National Autonomous University of Mexico; McRoberts & Tunnard Gallery, London, England;
- 1962: Galeriw Kobenhavn, Copenhagen, Denmark;
- 1964: Osborn Gallery, NYC;
- 1965: Hewlett Gallery, Carnegie Institute of Technology, Pittsburgh; Museum of Fine Arts, Houston;
- 1966: Franklin Siden Gallery, Detroit; Ester–Robles Gallery, Los Angeles; Flint Institute of Arts, Michigan;
- 1967: Westmoreland County Museum of Art, Greensburg, Pennsylvania;
- 1968, 70, 72: Meredith Long and Co., Houston;
- 1968, 69: Honolulu Museum of Art, Hawaii;
- 1969: Galerie Simonne Stern, New Orleans; Radcliffe College Graduate Center, Cambridge, Massachusetts;
- 1970: Ithaca College Museum of Art, Ithaca, New York; Royal Marks Gallery, NYC;
- 1973, 77: Roko Gallery, NYC;
- 1973–75: Smithsonian Institution Traveling Exhibition Service;
- 1975: Riva Yares Gallery, Scottsdale, Arizona;
- 1976: The Contemporary Museum, Honolulu (now the Honolulu Museum of Art Spalding House), Honolulu, Hawaii;
- 1978, 2000: Edwin A. Ulrich Museum of Art, Wichita State University, Kansas; Fort Collins Museum of Art, Colorado; Stables Gallery, Taos, New Mexico;
- 1981: Dord Fitz Gallery, December 1–15, Amarillo, Texas
- 1982: Foundation Gallery, NYC;
- 1987: Anita Shapolsky Gallery, NYC; Benton Gallery, Southampton, New York; The State Foundation on Culture and the Arts, Honolulu, Hawaii;
- 1992–93: David Anderson Gallery, Buffalo;
- 1999: Canfield Gallery, Santa Fe;

Retrospective:

- 1967: Westmoreland County Museum of Arts;
- 1982–83: Mitchell Museum, circ., Mount Vernon, Illinois;
- 1984: Museum of Fine Arts, Roanoke, Virginia;
- 2000: "Journey Without End: The Life and Art of Lawrence Calcagno," Museum of Arts, Albuquerque, Albuquerque, New Mexico.

== Selected group exhibitions ==
- 1949: "13th Annual Watercolor Exhibition of the San Francisco Art Association," San Francisco Museum of Art, California;
- 1953: "American Painters," Galerie Craven, Paris, France;
- 1955, 56, 58, 63, 65, 67: Whitney Museum of American Art Annuals and Biennials;
- 1958: "17 Americans," U.S. Pavilion, Brussels Worlds Fair;
- 1959: "9th Exhibition of Contemporary American Painting and Sculpture," University of Illinois Urbana-Champaign;
- 1960: "60 American Painters: 1960," Walker Art Center, Minneapolis; *1961: "American Abstract Expressionists and Imagists," Solomon R. Guggenheim Museum, NYC;
- 1966: "American Landscape: A Changing Frontier," National Collection of Fine Arts, Smithsonian Institution, Washington, D.C.;
- 1985, 86, 87, 89, 90, 92, 97–98, 2002: Anita Shapolsky Gallery (formerly Arbitrage Gallery), NYC.

Lawrence Calcagno died on April 28, 1993, in State College, Pennsylvania, while visiting relatives.

== Paintings in museums and public collections ==
- Museum of Fine Arts, Boston, Boston
- National Gallery of Art, Washington, D.C.
- Currier Gallery of Art, New Hampshire
- Guilford College Art Gallery, North Carolina
- Smithsonian American Art Museum, Washington, D.C.
- Westmoreland Museum of American Art, Greensburg, Pennsylvania
- The Governor Nelson A. Rockefeller Empire State Plaza Art Collection, Albany, New York

== Books ==
- Marika Herskovic, American Abstract Expressionism of the 1950s An Illustrated Survey, (New York School Press, 2003.) ISBN 0-9677994-1-4. pp. 66–69
- Suzan Campbell, Lawrence Calcagno, Albuquerque Museum, Journey without end : the life and art of Lawrence Calcagno (Albuquerque, N.M. : Albuquerque Museum, ©2000)
- Susan Landauer, Laguna Beach Museum of Art, The San Francisco school of abstract expressionism : [this book serves as a catalogue for an exhibition organized by the Laguna Art Museum, Laguna Beach, California; Laguna Art Museum, 27 January - 21 April 1996; San Francisco Museum of Modern Art, 18 July - 8 September 1996 (Berkeley, Calif. : Univ. of California Press [u.a.], 1996.) ISBN 0-520-08610-4 pp. 14, 226n30, 237n14, 216n78, 228n59,220n2765, 221n36.
- Thomas Albright, Art in the San Francisco Bay Area, 1945–1980 : an illustrated history (Berkeley, Calif. : University of California Press, 1985) ISBN 0-520-05193-9 pp. 39, 44, 266
