= Reworld =

American waste management company

Reworld Holding Corporation
- Type: Private company
- Industry: Renewable Energy/Waste Management
- Headquarters: Florham Park, New Jersey
- Key people: Azeez Mohammed, President and Chief Executive Officer
- Website: www.reworldwaste.com

Reworld, formerly Covanta (legal name; Reworld Holding Corporation), is a private energy-from-waste and industrial waste management services company headquartered in Florham Park, New Jersey. Most of its revenue comes from operating incineration facilities that serve a secondary purpose as power plants that burn trash as fuel. Reworld charges a fee for waste disposal and sells the electricity and metal slag produced from waste incineration.

Reworld was founded in 1939 as the Ogden Corporation. After starting as a public utility holding company it became a diverse conglomerate which had holdings in manufacturing, horse and greyhound racing, real estate, food, maritime transportation, arena management, and entertainment until its 2001 restructuring into a strictly energy business.

== Early history ==
In 1939, Ogden Corporation was founded as a successor to Utilities Power and Light, a Chicago-based utilities holding company that had been under a court-ordered trusteeship since 1937. Its subsidiaries included the Laclede Gas Company, Interstate Power Company, Missouri Natural Gas Company, Missouri Electric Power Company, Central State Utilities Corporation, and Central States Power and Light Corporation. The Atlas Corporation controlled the Ogden Corporation from its founding until it was sold to the Allen family in 1951. Benjamin G. Brewster, general auditor for the Atlas Corporation, served as Ogden's first president. He was succeeded by Maurice L. Sindeband.

As part of the reorganization of the Utilities Power and Light, Ogden was obligated to divest its utility interests so that it would comply with the Public Utility Holding Company Act of 1935. By 1948, Ogden's only remaining utility holding was the Interstate Power Company.

== Diversified interests ==
=== Manufacturing ===
In 1953, Ogden entered the manufacturing field when it acquired W. A. Case & Son Manufacturing Company, a manufacturer and distributor of plumbing and heating supplies, from Allen & Company. That same year the company purchased Teleregister from Western Union. In 1955, Ogden purchased Commercial Filters Corporation, an electronics and plumbing firm, and Luria Brothers & Co., an iron and steel scrap business. In 1957 the company purchased the Eimco Corporation and the American Foundry & Machine Company of Salt Lake City. Eimco manufactured filtration equipment and American Foundry & Machine made iron and steel castings. In 1959, Ogden acquired Avondale Marine Ways Inc., a New Orleans shipbuilding company.

In 1962, former Luria Brothers president Ralph E. Ablon became president and chairman of Ogden.

=== Foods ===
In 1966, Ogden acquired Tillie Lewis Foods, a California-based fruit and vegetable canner. Tillie Lewis was appointed to Ogden's board of directors, becoming the company's first female director. The following year, Ogden entered the frozen food business when it purchased Prosser Packers of Prosser, Washington. That same year it purchased ABC Consolidated, a food and refreshment firm that owned cafeterias, restaurants, snack bars, and the Nedick's fast food chain. Ogden's food division became one of the three biggest arena concession vendors in the United States. In 1968, Ogden purchased Mack Brothers, a company that manufactured frozen meats for airlines. In 1979, Ogden bought Progresso for $35 million. In 1986 Ogden Foods was sold to Pet, Inc. for $320 million.

=== Real estate development ===
In 1968, Ogden formed the Ogden Development Corporation after it purchased Charles Luckman Associates, a real estate, engineering, and architectural firm. Luckman was named president of Ogden Development.

=== Maritime transportation ===
In 1968, Ogden acquired Soros Associates, which designed and developed bulk handling and port facilities. That same year it purchased Bulk Transport Inc., which operated 18 bulk carriers. In 1979 Ogden purchased two 37,800-ton tankers from United Tanker Corporation for $31 million.

=== Horse and greyhound racing ===
In 1969, Odgen purchased Edwards Enterprises, which owned Waterford Park, Scarborough Downs, Fairmount Park, and Wheeling Downs. In 1972 the company purchased Suffolk Downs. In 1972, Odgen introduced greyhound racing at Wheeling Downs. Ogden Recreation formed a security subsidiary, Ogden Security, which was headed by former Boston Police Commissioner Edmund McNamara.

== Shift from manufacturing to services ==
In the 1980s, Ogden shifted from primarily a manufacturing business to a services company. Its first investment in the services industry was the $118 million acquisition of Allied Maintenance Corporation in 1982. Ogden undertook 19 acquisitions and mergers between 1983 and 1991. In 1986 Suffolk Downs was sold to Buddy LeRoux. By 1987, substantially all of Ogden's revenues were from services it didn't previously provide, like warehousing, running concession stands at stadiums, and janitorial services. In 1990, Ralph E. Ablon was succeeded as president and CEO by his son Richard. In 1991, it acquired a professional services company called ERC Environmental and Energy Services for $80 million.

== Ogden Entertainment ==
Ogden's entertainment division provided concession, merchandise, maintenance, cleaning, security, parking, and facility management services and concert promotions. Its clients included the Capital Centre, Rosemont Horizon, Palacio de los Deportes, Target Center, Anaheim Arena, Anaheim Stadium, and Rich Stadium. Ogden was a major investor and the manager of the Corel Centre in Ottawa.

In 1994, Ogden purchased Phoenix Park Racecourse in Dublin. The company planned on constructing a 2,500-seat conference center, a 65,000-seat stadium, a 12,000-seat indoor arena, and a hotel/casino on the site of the abandoned horse track, however, lack of support led to Ogden selling the property in 1998.

Ogden Entertainment produced Victor/Victoria, The Old Man and the Sea, Amazon, and Mark Twain's America.

In 1998, Ogden began construction on Jazzland, a 140-acre theme park located in New Orleans. In 1999, it acquired several water parks, including Wet'n Wild Inc.

== Beginnings in energy-from-waste ==
Ogden entered the energy-from-waste business in 1983, when it acquired intellectual property rights to the Martin GmbH incinerator technology commonly used in Europe, and a method of hazardous waste disposal. The company formed Ogden Martin Systems as a subsidiary for its energy-from-waste business. By 1986, Ogden had five energy-from-waste plants under construction and agreements in place to build four more. In 1993, Ogden subsidiary Ogden Projects, Inc. acquired ABB’s energy-from-waste business. This increased Ogden's energy-from-waste business from 21 plants with a capacity of 20,675 tons-per-day to 24 plants with a capacity of 28,135 tons-per-day.

== Sale of non-energy assets ==
By 1995, half of Ogden's revenues were from energy-from-waste projects. That year, Ogden was restructured into three divisions: aviation, energy, and entertainment. In December 1995, Ogden sold its bioservices unit to the McKesson Corporation. In 1997 it sold its building-maintenance and engineering-services operations in New York City to ABM Industries. In 1998 Ogden sold its aviation catering business to SC International Services, an Onex Corporation subsidiary that also owned SkyChefs and Caterair.

In 1999, Richard Ablon resigned as CEO. He was replaced by Scott Mackin. Mackin sought to sell off all of Ogden's non-energy assets. In 2000 the company sold its theme and water parks to Alfa Holdings for $148 million, its concessions, food, uniform, and child-care interests to Aramark for $225 million, its aviation ground services company to John Menzies for $117.8 Million, and its fixed-base operator business to Consolidated Lamda Holdings for $27 million.

== Covanta ==
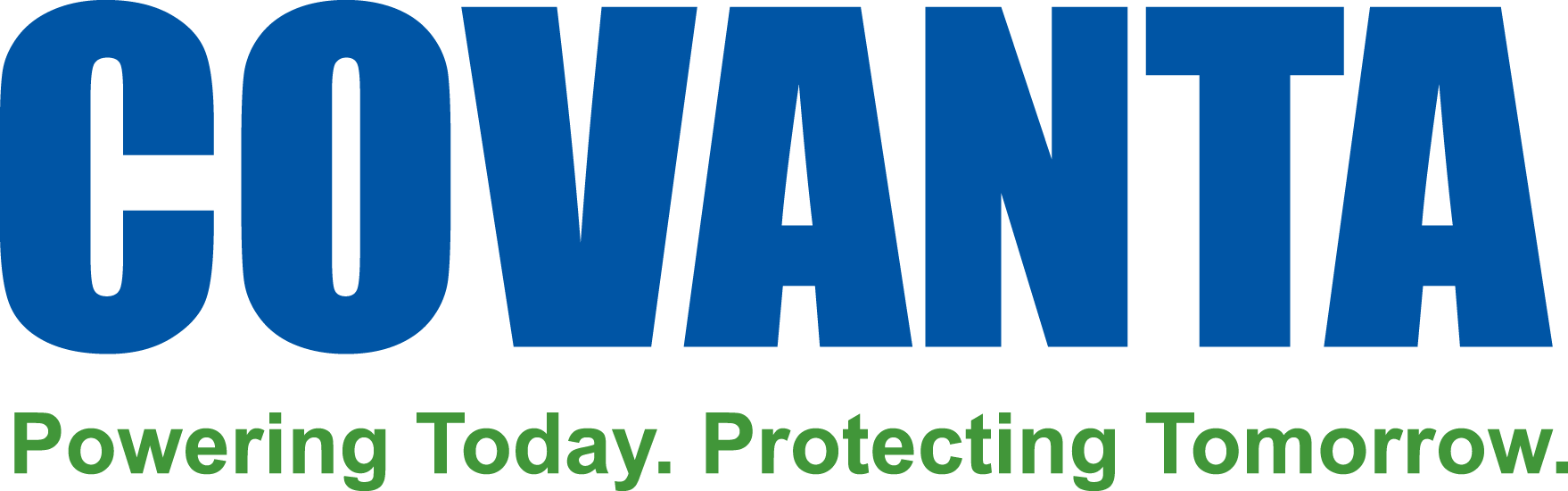
Covanta logo

In 2001, Ogden's name was changed to Covanta, a portmanteau of cooperation and advantages, to represent its focus on energy. Covanta and its 155 subsidiaries filed for bankruptcy in 2002. The bankruptcy was prompted by the California electricity crisis and the economic downturn following the September 11 attacks.

In 2004, Anthony Orlando was appointed CEO. That same year, 20 banks agreed to provide $463 million in financing to help the company get out of bankruptcy, restructure, and sell itself. Covanta came out of bankruptcy in 2004, when it was purchased by Danielson Holding Corporation. In 2005, Danielson sold Ogden's interests in casinos, hockey stadiums, and other areas to focus on its energy-from-waste business. Later that year, Covanta acquired an energy-from-waste business called American Ref-Fuel for $2 billion.

In 2009, Covanta bought the energy-from-waste business of Veolia Environment for $450 million. This was followed by acquisitions of environmental services companies Advanced Waste Services and GARCO for undisclosed sums in 2014.

In 2015, Covanta appointed Stephen J. Jones as its new CEO.

As of October 2020, Michael Ranger has succeeded Stephen J. Jones as Covanta's CEO.

In December 2021, the investment firm EQT Group announced the completion of its $5.3 billion acquisition of Covanta Holding Corporation and announced its new CEO, Azeez Mohammed.

In April 2024, Covanta renamed itself to Reworld.

EQT Infrastructure sold 25% stake of the company to GIC, a Singaporean sovereign wealth fund.

== Operations ==
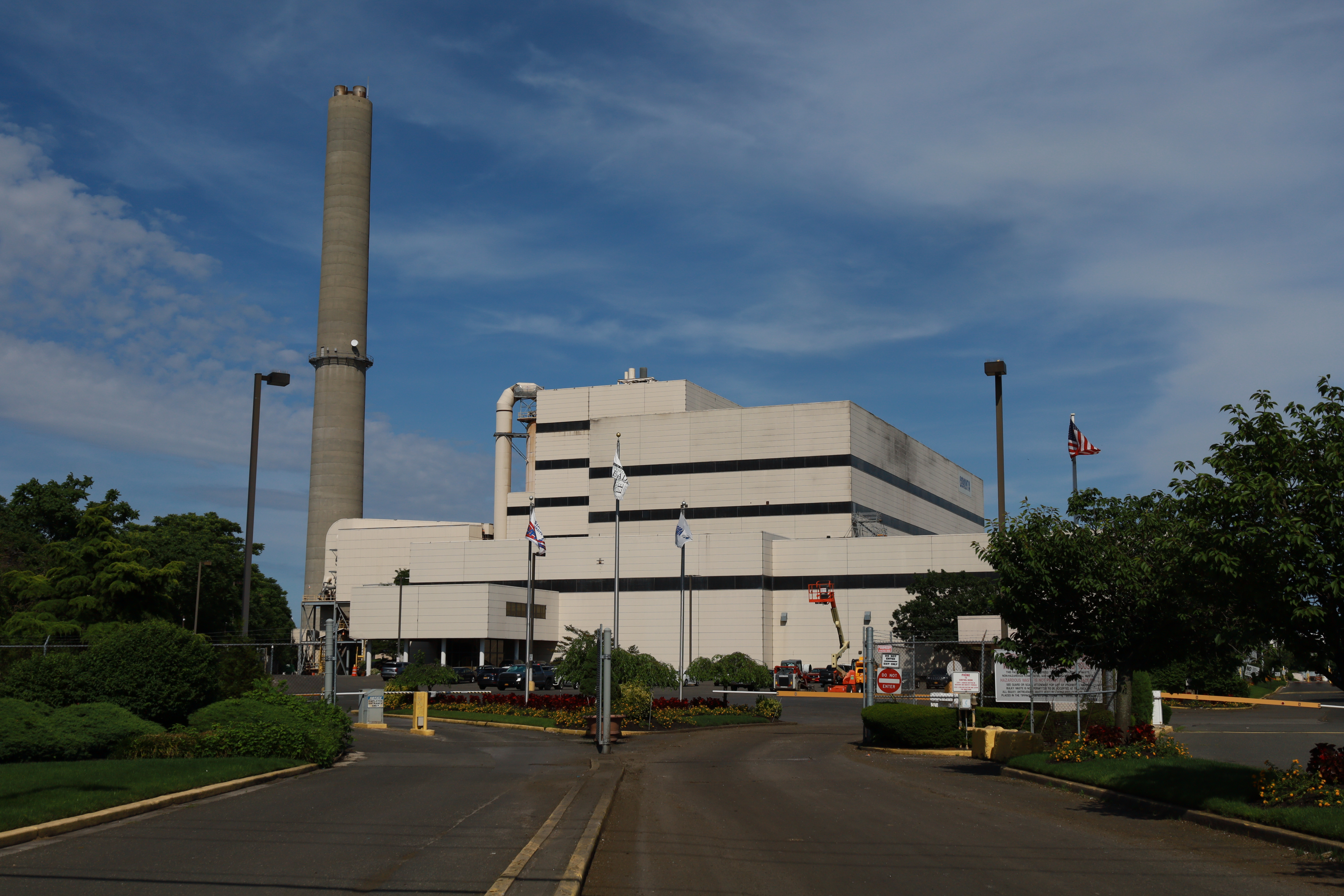
The Covanta Hempstead plant in Uniondale, New York

Reworld develops and operates facilities that burn trash to produce electricity, recover metals from the waste stream for recycling, and provide other industrial waste management services. As of 2013, about 60% of the revenue of Reworld came from selling trash disposal services and 25% from selling electricity produced by burning trash. The remainder of its revenue was from metal recycling, construction, and other services.

As of 2018, Reworld operated more than 40 waste-to-energy plants in North America, China, and Europe. Most of the revenue of Reworld came from long-term contracts with local governments or utility providers. It also benefits from tax incentives for green energy projects.

As of 2018, the company burned 20 million tons of trash annually and recycled 550,000 tons of metal. A majority of the trash is organic substances. It also burns a smaller amount of pharmaceutical byproducts, like expired medicines. Each ton of garbage contains about 50 pounds of metal that is removed with magnets, then sold for recycling.

At its plants, Reworld feeds trash into a furnace burning at 1,800 degrees Fahrenheit. The furnace produces steam that rotates a turbine, powering a generator. The remaining ash is rapidly cooled to prevent the formation of toxic compounds, then goes through additional processing. Government agencies regulate and monitor Covanta emission stacks for harmful toxins. Filters and other equipment are in place to remove most of the harmful particulates, and activated carbon removes most of the mercury. Steam is then released into the atmosphere.

== Environmental and social impact ==
Supporters of waste-to-energy facilities say burning trash to produce energy is an environmentally-friendly way to produce power and dispose of garbage that would otherwise fill landfills. Critics are concerned about unintentional releases of toxic materials from such facilities. Reworld itself has simultaneously received awards for a positive impact on the environment, while being sued and seeing protests for negative environmental impacts.

A 2008 study by the U.S. Environmental Protection Agency found that waste-to-energy plants were better for the environment than landfills, in part because they do not emit landfill gas and reduce reliance on coal- and oil-fueled generation stations. A study by Columbia University said if waste-to-energy was as popular in the United States as it is in Europe, the U.S. would reduce carbon emissions by 264 million tons annually. However, many environmentalists are skeptical about Covanta's claim that the steam emitted from a plant's furnace does not contain toxic materials. Some environmentalist distrust government monitoring of Covanta's emission stacks, and have lobbied for more regulation.

Additionally, Covanta has been cited numerous times for exceeding air pollution standards. For example, one Covanta plant in New Jersey was fined for violating emission standards; in 2010, a related lawsuit was settled for $875,000, which was used for a local green space program. Similar problems have led to fines and settlements for mercury emissions in Florida, tetrachlorodibenzodioxin emissions in Connecticut, and for a spill of hydrated lime in Dublin, Ireland.

An academic from Columbia University has said most energy-from-waste criticisms are related to dated technology or misinformation. Covanta said it is compliant with emission standards 99.9% of the time.

Covanta works with local governments to safely dispose of unwanted prescription drugs. In 2014, there was a controversy about whether an Oregon Covanta facility was burning aborted fetuses and other human body parts as part of a biomedical waste disposal program.

== See also ==
- Covanta Hempstead
- Essex County Resource Recovery Facility
- Delaware Valley Resource Recovery Facility
- Harrisburg incinerator
