= Frank Lobdell =

American painter

Ascent (Red), 1962, Frank Lobdell. Collection of San Jose Museum of Art.

Frank Lobdell (1921–2013) was an American painter, often associated with the Bay Area Figurative Movement and Bay Area Abstract Expressionism.

== Life and career ==
Frank Lobdell was born on August 23, 1921, in Kansas City, Missouri, and raised in Minnesota. He attended the St. Paul School of Fine Arts, St. Paul, Minnesota in 1939-40, and painted independently in Minneapolis from 1940 to 1942. He served in the U.S. Army in Europe during World War II (1942–46). Following the war, he moved to Sausalito, CA (1946–49), and from 1947-50 he attended the California School of Fine Arts on the G.I. Bill. In 1950, he left the U.S. for Paris, where he painted and studied at L’Academie de la Grande Chaumiere in 1950-51. After returning to the Bay Area, he taught at CSFA from 1957 to 1964. He was Visiting Artist at Stanford University in 1965, and taught as Professor of Art at Stanford from 1966 until his retirement in 1991.

In 1959 Lobdell was invited to participate in weekly figure drawing sessions with Elmer Bischoff, Richard Diebenkorn, and David Park, and after Park’s death, Lobdell became a regular member of the group. Although that circle broke up around 1965, Lobdell resumed his weekly drawing sessions in Palo Alto, where Nathan Oliveira, Keith Boyle, Jim Johnson, and other Stanford instructors joined him. In working from the figure, creating drawings in wash, ink, and occasionally graphite or gouache, Lobdell focused on shapes formed by light and shadow. Aspects of these figures—in a kind of abstracted shorthand—reemerge in the artist’s paintings, drawings, and prints.

In 1960, Lobdell was awarded the Nealie Sullivan Award by the San Francisco Art Association. Subsequent honors include a Pew Foundation Grant (1986); Medal for Distinguished Achievement in Painting from the American Academy and Institute of Arts and Letters (1988); and Academy Purchase Awards in 1992 and 1994. In 1998 he was elected to the National Academy of Design.

Lobdell died of cardiopulmonary arrest on December 14, 2013, in Palo Alto, at age 92.

== Exhibitions ==
Exhibiting internationally as early as 1951, Lobdell’s work was included in exhibitions at the Petit Palais, Paris, the Third Biennial of São Paulo, the Osaka International Festival, Japan, as well as venues in London, Turin, and Eindhoven, including early solo exhibitions in Paris and Geneva. He showed regularly in solo and group exhibitions in New York, Los Angeles, and San Francisco throughout the 1950s and 1960s, including at the Walker Art Center (1960); The Whitney Museum of American Art (1962); and the Solomon R. Guggenheim Museum, New York (1964). Solo museum exhibitions include San Francisco’s M. H. de Young Memorial Museum (1960, 1992); a major retrospective exhibition, “Paintings and Graphics from 1948 to 1965,” at the Pasadena Art Museum and Stanford University Art Museum (1966); “Frank Lobdell: Works, 1947-1992,” Stanford University Art Museum (1993); California Palace of the Legion of Honor, Fine Arts Museums of San Francisco, "Frank Lobdell: The Art of Making and Meaning" (2003); Portland Art Museum, Oregon, "Frank Lobdell: Making and Meaning" (2004), and others.

== Collections ==
Museums with works by Frank Lobdell include the Albright-Knox Art Gallery, Buffalo, NY; Amon Carter Museum of American Art, Fort Worth, TX; Honolulu Museum of Art Spalding House (formerly The Contemporary Museum, Honolulu); Fine Arts Museums of San Francisco, CA; Hood Museum of Art, Dartmouth College, NH; Iris & B. Gerald Cantor Center for Visual Arts, Stanford University; Jack S. Blanton Museum of Art, University of Texas, Austin; Los Angeles County Museum of Art; The Menil Collection, Houston; Museum of Contemporary Art San Diego; Museum of Fine Arts, Houston; Metropolitan Museum of Art, New York; National Academy of Design, New York; National Gallery of Art, Washington, DC; National Museum of American Art, Smithsonian Institution; The Oakland Museum of California; Phoenix Art Museum, AZ; Portland Art Museum, OR; Racine Art Museum, WI;San Francisco Museum of Modern Art; San Jose Museum of Art, CA; University of California, Berkeley Art Museum; Iowa State University, Brunnier Art Museum; and many others.
