= American Figurative Expressionism =

American art movement

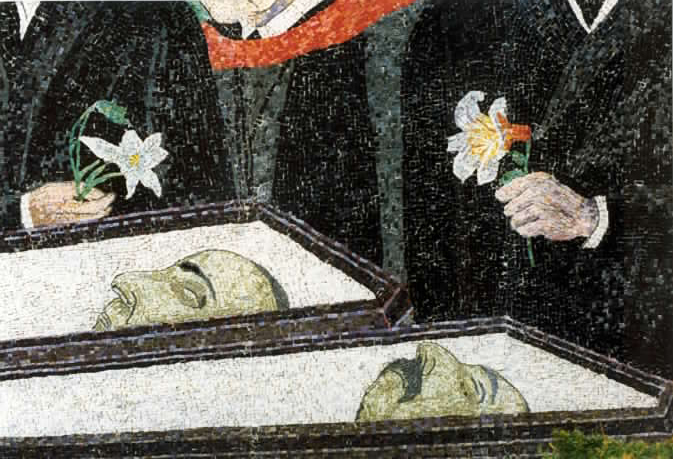
- A detail from Ben Shahn's "The Passion of Sacco and Vanzetti" series, 1931-32.
- Years active: 1930s to present
- Location: United States
- Major figures: Hyman Bloom, Jack Levine, Karl Zerbe
- Influences: German Expressionism, Modernism, Humanism, Symbolism (arts)

American Figurative Expressionism is a 20th-century visual art style or movement that first took hold in Boston, and later spread throughout the United States. Critics dating back to the origins of Expressionism have often found it hard to define. One description, however, classifies it as a Humanist philosophy, since it is human-centered and rationalist. Its formal approach to the handling of paint and space is often considered a defining feature, too, as is its radical, rather than reactionary, commitment to the figure.

The term "Figurative Expressionism" arose as a counter-distinction to "Abstract Expressionism." Like German Expressionism, the American movement addresses issues at the heart of the expressionist sensibility, such as personal and group identity in the modern world, the role of the artist as a witness to issues such as violence and corruption, and the nature of the creative process and its implications. These factors speak to the movement's strong association with the emotional expression of the artist's interior vision, with the kinds of emphatic brushstrokes and bold color found in paintings like Vincent van Gogh's The Starry Night and Edvard Munch's The Scream that have influenced generations of practitioners. They also speak to the rejection of the outward-facing "realism" of Impressionism, and tacitly suggest the influence of Symbolism on the movement, which sees meaning in line, form, shape and color.

European Expressionists

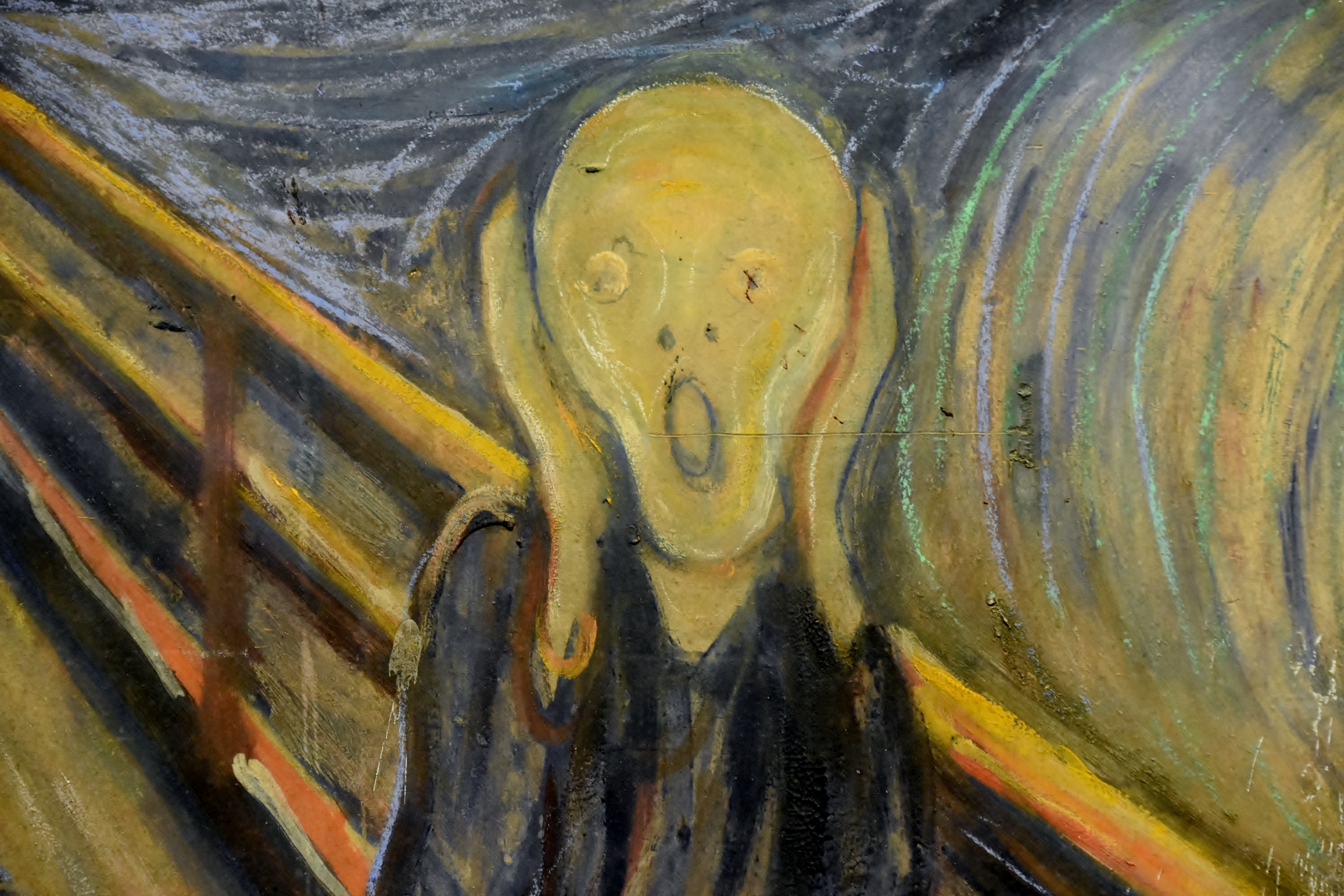
Edvard Munch, The Scream, oil, tempera and pastel on cardboard, 1893, National Gallery, Oslo

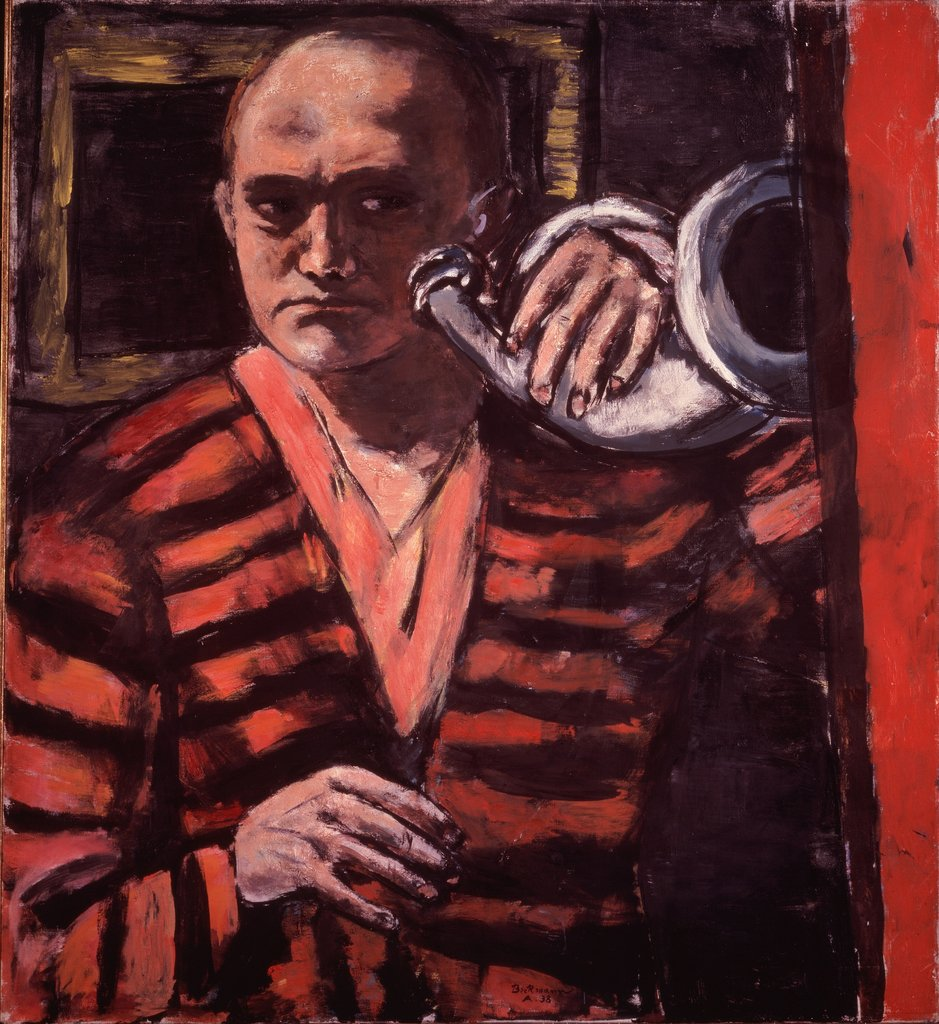
Max Beckmann's Self-Portrait with Horn, oil on canvas, 1938.

The Boston origins of the American movement date to a "wave of German and European-Jewish immigrants" in the 1930s and their "affinities to the contemporary German strain of figurative painting ... in artists like Otto Dix (1891–1969), Ernst Ludwig Kirchner (1880–1938), Oskar Kokoschka (1886–1980), and Emil Nolde (1867–1956), both in style and in subject matter," art historian Adam Zucker writes. Calling Humanism the defining ideal of the American movement, Zucker says it was "inspired largely by political and/or social issues and conflicts," much as many of the practitioners of "mid-20th century art, including Dada, Surrealism, Social Realism, took stances against war or wars, both on and off the canvas.

Indeed, many Boston artists had links to the School of the Museum of Fine Arts, Boston or the Boris Mirski Gallery where painters like Karl Zerbe (1903–1972), Hyman Bloom (1913–2009), Jack Levine (1915–2010), David Aronson (b. 1923) studied, taught, exhibited and ultimately grew into activists after "openly challenging a statement issued by the Boston Institute of Modern Art under the heading ‘Modern Art and the American Public.'" Concerned that Boston's Brahmin museums would never support them, they founded the New England Chapter of Artists Equity to fight for their rights and organized the Boston Arts Festival to make art more democratic.

Their ongoing work and modernist dialogues envisioned art "as a narrative that unfolded through the incorporation of figures and landscapes into allegories drawn ... from traditional or imagined subject matter, fueled by the artists’ experiences and spirituality. Their themes tended toward "scenes and images in which they expressed profound emotions, horrors and fantasies in a largely allegorical manner. Spiritual and fantastical scenes were thus common, and depictions of sublime religious displays, political satire, and treatments of the theme of human mortality ... all contributed to the progression of figurative painting and to the evolving definition of modern humanist art."

== Expressionism's European roots ==
Two of the Earliest European Expressionists

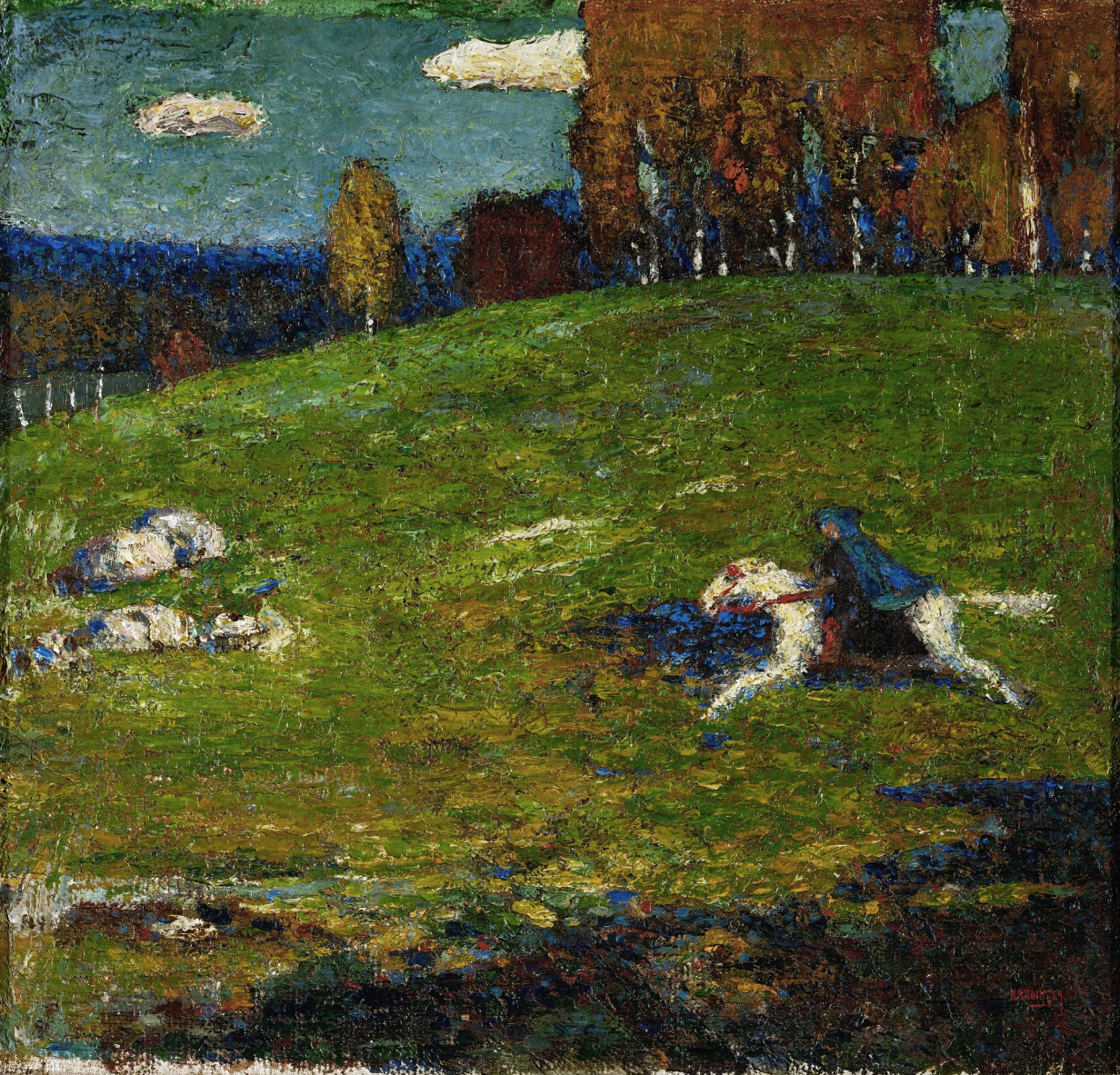
Kandinsky's Der Blaue Reiter, painted in a style Kandinsky would reject within the decade, oil on canvas, 1903, Stiftung Sammlung E.G. Bührle, Zurich.

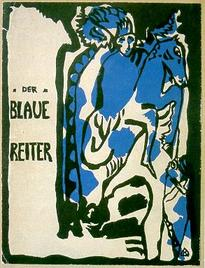
Kandinsky's radical change of style, illustrated on the cover of Der Blaue Reiter almanac, c. 1912.

The Expressionist movement was born of early 20th-century artists James Ensor, Edvard Munch and Vincent van Gogh. But French, German and Russo-German groups working between 1905 and 1920 helped develop it. The French group, concentrating on the painterly aspects of their work, particularly color, was classified as Fauvist ("wild beasts"), and Henri Matisse is considered a key practitioner. The Dresden-based strain was known as Die Brücke, referring to the group's desire to "bridge" the past. The self-taught Die Brücke had a strong interest in primitivism, like the Fauvists, but their color choices were in a less natural, higher key than those of the French, and their streetscapes were edgy. Their content was also sometimes sexual, in the spirit of the alienation they were expressing in woodcuts and sculpture. The final group, Der Blaue Reiter ("The Blue Rider"), based in Munich, was largely of Russian nationality, and included, most famously, Wassily Kandinsky. This group was considerably more abstract in orientation, rejecting the more realistic approach of Kandinsky's Der Blaue Reiter painting, which lent the group its name.

== Boston Figurative Expressionism ==
The art historian Judith Bookbinder established Boston Figurative Expressionism as an integral part of American modernism bracketing the Second World War, saying "[It] expressed the anxiety of the modern age with the particular accent of the city." The early members of the Boston Expressionist group were immigrants, or children of immigrants, from Central and Eastern Europe. Many were Jewish, and some had Germanic backgrounds.

Thus, German Expressionists like Max Beckmann, George Grosz and Oskar Kokoschka were a strong influence on the Boston painters, as was German-born painter Karl Zerbe who taught at the School of the Museum of Fine Arts, Boston, one of two axes central to the formation of Boston Expressionism, along with the modernist Boris Mirski Gallery. In the 1930s, during its early development, the movement attracted only a small group of supporters and, during that period, many German emigres, critics and scholars also tried to deny all connections to art movements associated in any way with Germany. But by the 1940s, Hyman Bloom and Jack Levine, both of whom had begun as Works Progress Administration painters, had already made a mark. In 2006, Danforth Museum of Art Director Katherine French said, "There was a period of about six months when Hyman Bloom was the most important painter in the world, and probably a period of about five years when he was the most important painter in America." Praised by Time magazine while having scarcely sold a picture he was called "the first abstract expressionist" by New Yorkers Jackson Pollock and Willem de Kooning. Back in Boston, he was later considered to be one of the pioneers of Boston Expressionism, a movement that thrived throughout the 1950s, and is still influential today.

Notable Boston Figurative Expressionists
David Aronson (1923–)	William Harsh	Arthur Polonsky (1925–2019)	Karl Zerbe (1903–1972)
Hyman Bloom (1913–2009)	Suzanne Hodes	Joyce Reopel (1933–2019)	Harold Zimmerman
Bernard Chaet (1924–2012)	Jon Imber (1950–2014)	Barbara Swan (1922–)	Mel Zabarsky (1932–2019)
Kahlil Gibran (sculptor) (1922–2008)	Reed Kay	Lois Tarlow	
Philip Guston (1913–1980)	Jack Levine (1915–2010)	Steven Trefonides (1926-2021)	

== New York Figurative Expressionism ==
In the 1950s, New York City surpassed Paris as the global center of art with the birth of Abstract Expressionism. That movement, like American Figurative Expressionism, sought both a definitive expression of modernity and a different postwar identity. But where figurative expressionism embraced the humanism implicit in the figure, Abstract Expressionism explicitly rejected it. Hyman Bloom's stature in the New York movement waned, as the difference in point of view hardened, and critics like Clement Greenberg argued for art that referenced itself, not literary relics like figuration. Meanwhile, critic, and Action Painting advocate, Harold Rosenberg saw Jackson Pollock as an ideal.

=== Rebutting the critics: 1930s–1960 ===
"During the war years and into the 1950s," Judith E. Stein writes, "the general public was to remain highly suspicious of abstraction, which many considered un-American. While the art critic Clement Greenberg successfully challenged the public's negative response to abstraction, his attempt to communicate to the New York figurative painters of the fifties was less successful." In 1960, Thomas B. Hess wrote: "[T]he 'New figurative painting' which some have been expecting as a reaction against Abstract Expressionism was implicit in it at the start, and is one of its most lineal continuities."

In 1953, the journal Reality was founded "to rise to the defense of any painter's right to paint any ways he wants." Backing this mission statement was an editorial committee that included Isabel Bishop (1902–1988), Edward Hopper (1882–1967), Jack Levine (1915–2010), Raphael Soyer (1899–1987) and Henry Varnum Poor (1888–1970).

The sculptor Philip Pavia became "partisan publisher" of It is. A Magazine for Abstract Art that he founded in 1958. In an open letter to Leslie Katz, the new publisher of Arts Magazine, he wrote: "I am begging you to give the representational artist a better deal. The neglected representational and near-abstract artists, not the abstractionists, need a champion these days."

Although none of these figurative advocates had the stature of critics like Clement Greenberg or Harold Rosenberg, they were recognized by critics as radicals, "represent[ing] a new generation to whom figurative art was in a sense more revolutionary than abstraction." A conversation recollected by Thomas B. Hess emphasized the perceived power of the critic: "It is impossible today to paint a face, pontificated critic Clement Greenberg around 1950. "That's right," said de Kooning, "and it's impossible not to."

The literary historian Marjorie Perloff has made a convincing argument that Frank O'Hara's poems on the works of Garace Hartigan and Larry Rivers proved "that he was really more at home with painting that retains at least some figuration than with pure abstraction." Listing Grace Hartigan, Larry Rivers, Elaine de Kooning, Jane Freilicher, Robert De Niro, Sr., Felix Pasilis, Wolf Kahn and Marcia Marcus as artists who responded to "the siren-like call of nature," O'Hara explained himself in "Nature and New Painting," 1954. New York Figurative Expressionists belong within abstract expressionism, he argued, pointing out they had always taken a strong position against an implied protocol, "whether at the Metropolitan Museum or the Artists Club."

=== Early Figurative Expressionists: 1930s–1940s ===
Museum of Contemporary Art of Detroit (MOCAD) curator Klaus Kertess observed that "[o]n the eve of the new abstraction's purge of figuration and its rise to all-encompassing prominence, the figure began to acquire a new and forceful vigor." That vigor was represented through myth and spirituality by Max Weber (1881–1961) and Marsden Hartley (1877–1943). But it was also represented with a lyric restraint by Milton Avery (1885–1965) and by visible clarity and directness in the case of Edwin Dickinson (1891–1978).

=== Figurative Art during Abstract Expressionism: 1950s ===
New York Figurative Expressionism of the 1950s represented a trend where "diverse New York artists countered the prevailing abstract mode to work with the figure." The figure served different purposes for different artists:

- Figure as Framework: For artists like Willem de Kooning (1904–1997); Jackson Pollock (1912–1956); Conrad Marca-Relli (1913–2000) the figure served as the framework on which expressionist canvases were built.
- Old Master Influences: For others, like Larry Rivers (1923–2002); Grace Hartigan (1922–), their use of the figure was influenced by Old Master and history painting.
- The Representational Figure: For many others, the figure served as the subject of representational portraiture: Elaine de Kooning (1918–1989); Balcomb Greene (1904–1990); Robert De Niro, Sr. (1920–1993); Fairfield Porter (1907–1975); Gregorio Prestopino (1907–1984); Lester Johnson, (1919–2010); George McNeil (1909–1995); Henry Gorski (1918–2010); Robert Goodnough (1917–); and Earle M. Pilgrim (1923–1976)
- The Stylized Figure: Finally, there were those who used the figure in their own versions of allegorical or mythical painting. In these cases, the figure served as a stylistic element reminiscent of the German Expressionists, but with the heroic scale of the Abstract Expressionists:" Artists in this category included: Jan Müller (1922–1958); Robert Beauchamp (1923–1995); Harry Bertschmann [(b.1935);Nicholas Marsicano (1914–1991); Bob Thompson (1937–1966); Ezio Martinelli (1913–1980) Irving Kriesberg (1919–2009) and Edward Boccia (1921-2012)

Museum of Contemporary Art, Detroit (MOCAD) curator Klaus Kertess described the figure's trajectory this way: "[D]uring the late forties and early fifties ... the figure in its role as harbinger of conservatism became an obvious target for abstractionist defensiveness—a defensiveness prone to blur the vast distinctions between figurative painters and to exaggerate the difference between the figurative and the nonfigurative. It was not until the late sixties and early seventies that the figure was permitted to return from exile and even to make claims to centrality."

== Bay Area Figurative Expressionism: 1950–1970 ==
The Bay Area Figurative movement is considered the first major art movement to come out of the West Coast. It is rooted in San Francisco's California School of Fine Arts, where many of the area's figurative expressionists taught or studied. Its formal beginnings are traditionally dated to a 1957 exhibition at Oakland Museum where local artists, working in a range of genres, depicted landscapes, figures, and contemporary settings, definitively rejected the pure abstraction then dominating New York's Abstract Expressionist scene. This exhibition, which was called "Contemporary Bay Area Figurative Painting," brought widespread attention to the tendency that featured representational imagery within a painterly mode conditioned by the rich and vigorous brushwork of abstract expressionism. There are critics who also noted a sense of collaboration between the Bay Area artists as they translated the abstract expressionism into a viable figurative style.

Key figures in the Bay Area movement included Richard Diebenkorn (1922–1993), David Park (1911–1960) and Elmer Bischoff (1916–1991). These three, along with James Weeks (1922–1998) were considered the four founders of the movement. They created artworks that focused on recognizable subjects such as the Bay Area landscape. Particularly, Park provided the spark for the artistic movement after his painting of a jazz band caused a stir in the San Francisco's art community after it was included in a group exhibition. His 1951 painting Kids on Bikes is also seen as emblematic of the movement.

Notable Bay Area Figurative Artists
Theophilus Brown (1919–2012)	Rolland Petersen (1926–)
Joan Brown (1938–1992)	Joan Savo (1918–1992)
Bruce McGaw (1935–)	Hassel Smith (1915–2007)
Manuel Neri (1930–)	James Weeks (1922–1998)
Nathan Oliveira (1928–2010)	Paul Wonner (1920–2008)

== Chicago Figurative Expressionism: 1948–1960s ==
"The artist and critic Franz Schulze named the dozen or so artists “The Monster Roster” for their subject matter – and as a reference to the “Monsters of the Midway,” nickname of the University of Chicago football team." Many members of this group fought during World War II and attended the School of the Art Institute of Chicago through the support provided by the G.I. Bill./ Chicago's 1950s' figurative expressionists "shared a deep concern with an existential human image of thwarted but inexorable endurance." Poet and art critic Carter Ratcliff said, "The Chicagoans of the 1950s never coalesced into a group. For all its incompatibility, their art shared one purpose: to announce the artist's alienation in terms clear enough to be widely understood."

Leon Golub (1922–2004) spearheaded the Monster Roster by writing an impassioned defense of figurative Expressionism in an article for the College Art Journal in 1953 that also criticized abstraction as a denial of Man's humanity, calling it a dehumanized and dehumanizing form. Other key figures in the Midwest's most important contribution to American art included George Cohen (1919–1999), Seymour Rosofsky (1924–1981) and H. C. Westermann (1922–1981).

== Decline of Abstract Expressionism ==
Richard Diebenkorn was among the earliest Abstract Expressionist who returned to the figure before the crisis of Abstract Expressionism, but many others would follow. Phillip Guston began to denounce Abstract Expressionism publicly in 1970, according to his daughter author Musa Mayer, railing that "American Abstract art is a lie, a sham, a cover-up for a poverty of spirit. A mask to mask the fear of revealing oneself. A lie to cover up how bad one can be. … It is an escape from the true feelings we have, from the ‘raw,’ primitive feelings about the world – and us in it.” The crisis of Abstract Expressionism now freed many ... artists to follow their long-frustrated inclination to paint the figure," which resulted in the resurgence of the American Figurative Expressionism, with Boston Expressionism now in its third generation.

== See also ==
- Abstract expressionism
- Expressionism
- Archives of American Art
- Bay Area Figurative Movement
- Boston expressionism
- Figurative art
- Narrative art
- New York Figurative Expressionism

== External links to visual art collections ==
- New England: Danforth Museum of Art
- Boston: DeCordova Museum and Sculpture Park
- Boston: Harvard Art Museums, Hyman Bloom collection / Karl Zerbe collection
- Bay Area: SFMoMA, David Park collection / Richard Diebenkorn collection / Elmer Bischoff collection
- Chicago: The Broad, Leon Golub collection
