= Giglio Dante =

Italian-American painter (1914–2006)

Giglio Raphael Dante
- Born: September 4, 1914; Rome, Italy
- Died: December 12, 2006 (aged 92); East Hampton, New York, U.S.
- Occupation: Painter
- Known for: Boston Expressionism, abstract expressionist works

Dante Raphael Giglio, better known as Giglio Dante, (Sept 4, 1914 – Dec 12, 2006) was an Italian-born American painter.

Dante was an active painter for over six decades. His roots started in Boston, Massachusetts, with a group of other emerging artists later known as the Boston Expressionists. Giglio Dante can be seen pictured alongside his contemporaries in ARTnews, which published a John Brook portrait of eleven Boston painters including Karl Zerbe, Reed Champion, Ture Bengtz, Maud Morgan, Kahlil Gibran, Esther Geller, Carl Pickhardt, John Northey, Thomas Fransioli, and Lawrence Kupferman.

== Biography ==
Giglio Dante came to Boston from Rome in 1921. His father, a respected muralist, trained him in the classical techniques of oil-tempera and fresco. Considered a teenage prodigy, Dante started painting portraits and murals at a young age. In the mid-1930s when working for the W.P.A., he was commissioned to paint two murals, depicting working Italian immigrants, at the Michelangelo School located on Charter Street in Boston. The murals were not without controversy as some residents considered the depiction of Italians as unhappy laborers to be distasteful. Many of his early paintings show the influence of Rouault and Picasso. It was at this time he broke with his father in his portrait work and the traditions of a classical painter and became and an active member in the Boston Expressionists Movement.

The Sgraffito technique with semi-abstract symbolism was widely used by Dante in the 1930s and 40s. He exhibited at the famous Boris Mirski Gallery and taught classes at the Mirski school of Art. He was also part of the dramatic Abstract Expressionist Movement in New York during the mid 1940s and 50s. He contributed to the Provincetown art colony during this period and was one of two founders of Studio Five, a collective artist studio, with sculptor Kenneth Campbell.

Dante showed his work in Boston and New York City during the 1940s and moved permanently to New York in the 1950s. He became part of the Betty Parson Gallery for 10 years and sold with the likes of Mark Rothko, Hans Hofmann, and Barnett Newman. He was one of the first artists to move into the Westbeth Artists Community in 1970 where he exhibited in their major shows. It was during this period he started with the abstract sculpture technique of Assemblage.

He started dividing his time during the mid 1970s between Westbeth NYC and East Hampton, NY. He finally moved permanently to East Hampton in 1981.

Dante continued painting and in 1986 he won Best in Show at Guild Hall's Annual Artist Members Exhibition for his mixed media work of “Portrait of Contessa V.”

Giglio Dante died at age 92 on December 12, 2006. He is buried along with his wife in the Green River Cemetery of Long Island NY.

== Solo exhibitions ==
- 1945 Mortimer Brandt Gallery, New York, New York
- 1946, 1948, 1953 Betty Parsons Gallery, New York, New York
- 1944, 1946, 1947 Boris Mirski Gallery, Boston, Massachusetts
- 1949 Fitchburg Art Museum, Fitchburg, Massachusetts
- 1958 Salpeter Gallery, New York, New York
- 1948, 1950, 1956, 1960 Feingarten Art Gallery, Chicago, Illinois
- Rutgers University, New Brunswick, New Jersey
- 1963 Krasner Gallery, New York, New York
- 1960, 1963 Lucy Bayne Gallery, Los Angeles, California
- 1968 Albright College, Reading, Pennsylvania
- 1971, 1972 Westbeth Gallery, New York, New York
- 1981, 1982 Elaine Benson Gallery, Bridgehampton, New York
- 1986 Bologna/Landi Gallery, East Hampton, New York
- 1987 Guild Hall, East Hampton, New York
- 1987–91, Benton Gallery, Southampton, New York

== Collections and exhibitions (1945–2000) ==
- Museum of Modern Art, Rome, Italy
- The Institute of Modern Art, Boston Massachusetts
- Springfield Museum of Fine Arts, Springfield, Massachusetts
- Betty Parsons Collection
- Thomas B. Hess Collection
- Brandeis University
- Nathaniel Saltonstall Collection
- Albright College Fine Arts Collection
- Guild Hall Museum, East Hampton, New York
- Golden Gate International Exposition, San Francisco, California
- Boston Museum of Fine Arts, Massachusetts
- Pennsylvania Academy, Philadelphia, Pennsylvania
- Museum of Modern Art, Rome Italy
- Whitney Museum of American Art, New York, New York
- Cincinnati Art Museum, Ohio
- Worcester Art Museum
- Arles Museum, France
- Corcoran Gallery of Art, Washington, DC
- Metz Museum, France
- Toulouse Museum des Beaux Arts, France
- Elaine Benson Gallery, Bridgehampton, New York
- Bologna/Landi Gallery, Bridgehampton, New York
- Benton Gallery, Southampton, New York
- Arlene Bujese Gallery, East Hampton, New York
- Wainscott Gallery, Wainscott, New York
- Nabi Gallery, Sag Harbor, New York
