= Kahlil Gibran (sculptor) =

Lebanese American painter and sculptor

Kahlil G. Gibran
- Born: Kahlil George Gibran; November 29, 1922; Boston, Massachusetts, United States
- Died: April 13, 2008 (aged 85); Boston, Massachusetts, United States
- Education: School of the Museum of Fine Arts, Boston MA
- Known for: Sculpture, Painting,
- Movement: American Expressionism Boston School

Kahlil G. Gibran (November 29, 1922 – April 13, 2008), sometimes known as Kahlil George Gibran, was a Lebanese American painter and sculptor from Boston, Massachusetts. A student of the painter Karl Zerbe at the School of the Museum of Fine Arts, Boston, Gibran first received acclaim as a magic realist painter in the late 1940s when he exhibited with other emerging artists later known as the "Boston Expressionists". Called a "master of materials", as both artist and restorer, Gibran turned to sculpture in the mid-fifties. In 1972, in an effort to separate his identity from his famous relative and namesake, the author of The Prophet, Gibran Kahlil Gibran, who was cousin both to his father Nicholas Gibran and his mother Rose Gibran, the sculptor co-authored with his wife Jean a biography of the poet entitled Kahlil Gibran His Life And World. Gibran is known for multiple skills, including painting; wood, wax, and stone carving; welding; and instrument making.

== Early years ==
=== Childhood ===
Gibran aspired to be an artist since he was seven. The third of five children, he was inspired by his namesake cousin and godfather, the poet Gibran Khalil Gibran. Related to the author on both sides of his family, he was nurtured by his Lebanese immigrant family in Boston. Gibran spent hours in his father's woodworking workshop. From his cabinet-maker father, he learned about instrument making and helped fashion stringed instruments, including a miniature violin that he treasured all his life.

Gibran lived in what is now Chinatown, Boston, and attended local public schools. As a boy, he frequented the Denison House where he occasionally would see social worker Amelia Earhart drive up in her famous yellow roadster. He regularly visited the local public library and enjoyed crafting exotic objects like the scimitar in Edgar Allan Poe's The Pit and the Pendulum or the guillotine from Tale of Two Cities. At eleven, he received Honorable Mention in a national soap-carving contest, and during his senior year at English High School, was awarded the Lawrence Prize for Art.

=== Studying ===
Gibran entered the School of the Museum of Fine Arts, Boston in 1940. He was offered a full scholarship if he concentrated on sculpture. However, he chose a partial scholarship given by the painting department where he studied with Karl Zerbe. The experience shaped his career. “It was an atelier", he recalled. “They let us develop our own vision while grounding us in the fundamentals – drawing, anatomy, techniques, and materials". Winner of The Boit Summer Competition in 1942, the young artist soon was recognized as a master of diverse materials. He was known as jittery Gibran for prodigious production fueled by an abundance of nervous energy and for his deep concern that he not be a burden to his family. In 1943, shortly after his study for a mural Entrée á Paradis was awarded the Karl Zerbe prize, he left school in order to apprentice at several craft-related organizations.

For a period during World War II, he served as draftsman at Harvard's Underwater Sound Laboratory. Later his carving skills led him to work for Martin Heiligmann, a gilder of fine objects and frames. Finding a Joy Street studio on Beacon Hill, he also started to work for Boris Mirski whose Charles Street Gallery was attracting Boston artists and collectors. Word of the young artist's talent spread, and Gibran briefly honed his skills at the Conservation Laboratory of Harvard University's Fogg Museum. He finally located a studio at 15 Fayette Street in Boston's Bay Village, where he settled in as a freelancer, restoring and repairing fine art objects during the day, and painting at night. Shortly after moving, he met sculptor and conservator Morton C. Bradley. The two would maintain a lifelong friendship.

== Early career ==
=== Painting ===
Gibran first displayed original creative work at Boris Mirski's Charles Street Gallery in 1944. A January 1946 review of his pictures at the Stuart Art Gallery, introduced him to Boston's art world: “Mr. Gibran is in his early twenties. ... He is a mystic and seeks a symbolism which can convey transcendent ideas... a romantic of the artistic clan of Redon. In another Stuart Art Gallery exhibit, Study of a Head by Kahlil Gibran was described as “the tenuous enterprise of another young Boston mystic". Soon his paintings appeared at Symphony Hall, along with panels by his mentor Karl Zerbe in a selection of work by contemporary artists titled Fantasy in Art. One reviewer wrote: “There are also among these fantasts, visionary artists who perceive images in tenuous dreamlike mists... The portrait for example by Kahlil Gibran".

By June 1947, a New York Times review of paintings he exhibited at Jacques Seligmann's gallery in the group show, Artists Under 25, acknowledged his efforts with the brief but laudatory comment, “Kahlil Gibran works subtly and effectively in encaustic". Five months later, Boston's Institute of Modern Art (now Institute of Contemporary Art, Boston) featured works “carefully chosen from the recent production of notable artists in Massachusetts". Exhibitors included Karl Knaths, Edward Hopper and Edwin Dickinson along with younger Boston artists. ART news published a John Brook portrait of eleven Boston painters including Karl Zerbe, Reed Champion, Ture Bengtz, Giglio Dante, Maud Morgan, and Lawrence Kupferman. The photograph shows a serious and pensive Gibran in profile seated on a ladder near the painter Esther Geller.

In her review of this seminal show, Dorothy Adlow, wrote in the Christian Science Monitor: “Kahlil Gibran, who like Mr.David Aronson is 24 years old, paints a Pietà in oil with remarkable technical adaptation of pigment". And later, when the Pietà was exhibited in a March, 1948 Artists’ Equity show, this critic heralded it as “one of the more distinguished pictures painted in Boston in recent years".

Within a year, his identity as a “visionary” with great technique was spreading. Reviewing contemporary New England painters at the Fitchburg Art Center, Ms. Adlow reinforced this image: “The Old Fashioned Bouque’ by Kahlil Gibran sets forth once again the sensitive gift of that young visionary. Mr. Gibran employs his wax technique most effectively. He works with consistency, grace, and poetry".

Gibran continued to exhibit in group shows at the Niveau Gallery, and made his New York solo debut at the Mortimer Levitt Gallery, April 1948. In The Artists Speaks, Adlow again introduced him: "Gibran is one of the exceptional group of talented artists who have come to the fore in Boston in the last few years. He has a rare capacity of envisioning intangibles, for conjuring the immaterial in tenuousness and exiguousness of concrete image... the most recent painting Joseph’s Cloak discards the subdued chromatic scheme for a rich palette of colors that sing out movingly".

=== Time in Provincetown ===
By June 1949, then married to Eleanor “Elly” Mott a fellow student at Museum School, Gibran began working for the sculptor Ken Campbell during a summer in Provincetown. With his growing reputation as a magic realist, he formed close friendships with several Provincetown artists, including Varujan Boghosian, Mischa Richter, Giglio Dante, poet Cecil Hemley, and painter/poet Weldon Kees. For editor Hemley's The Noonday Press he designed that publishing house's first colophon. He also became involved with Forum 49, founded by Hemley and Kees a pivotal event in American 20th century culture. Jules Aarons brilliant physicist and photographer of Provincetown's artistic community documented Gibran, his wife, and colleagues during that fecund period. Notable is a portrait of the artist with his fish skeleton painting On the Beach shown at Gallery 200 during the original exhibit of Forum 49, and then again, at the Provincetown Art Association's fiftieth anniversary memorial show in 1999. Spending summers in Provincetown, Gibran and his wife opened a boutique called Paraphernalia. It became known for its fanciful signs, innovative displays and handsome mannequins, all crafted by Gibran. But soon, railing at life as shopkeeper, he explored other avenues professionally and personally. The couple agreed to separate, Gibran returning to Boston and Elly taking over the shop.

=== Innovation ===
During the early fifties, Gibran, with the young Boston painter William Georgenes, spent two summers in Nantucket, working on new paintings and exploring new techniques. Always experimenting with the latest in materials, he and artist Alfred Duca, also living at the 15 Fayette Street studio, made major media breakthroughs. New Plastic Medium Used by Painter was Dorothy Adlow's response to Gibran's innovative technique shown at the Margaret Brown Gallery, during the winter of 1952.

At 30, Gibran turned to a completely new art form. “My marriage was breaking up.."., he told the Globe in 1967. "I had too much energy.... After my divorce, psychiatry made me understand I had to sculpt". Crediting Dr. Clemens Benda, with pointing his way to sculpture and, in some ways, transforming his entire persona, even his approach to art, Gibran developed a strong bond with that Jungian psychiatrist. He had learned of him from Hyman Bloom who, like many Boston artists of the period, were searching for spirituality in non-traditional ways.

=== Instrument-building ===
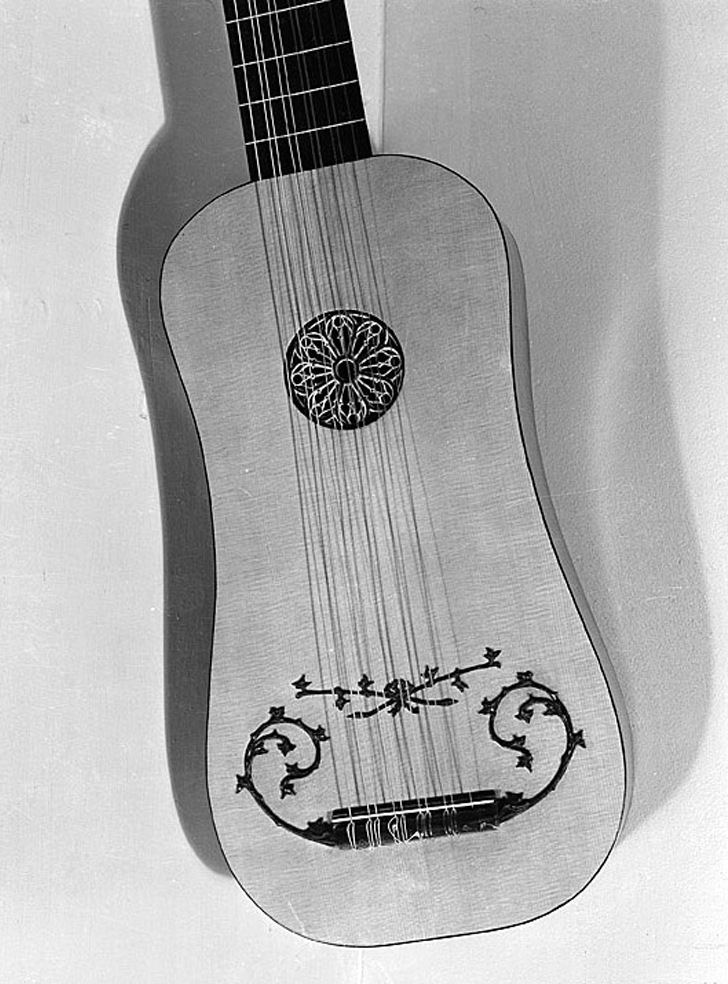
Vihuela built by Kahlil Gibran

Throughout the 1940s, Gibran's friendship with Bloom was, in part, due to their mutual devotion to the music of what was then called “the Orient". The young Gibran had always searched for recordings of early 20th century Arabic singers and instrumentalists, and soon joined a group of devotees of Middle Eastern and Indian music that included Bloom, composer Alan Hovhaness, painter Hermon Di Giovanno, sculptors Frank and Jean Teddy Tock, Dr. Betty Gregory, and, later on, James Rubin, founder of Boston's Pan Orient Arts Foundation.

As Gibran's reputation for building instruments grew, he also repaired instruments for players from local nightclubs as well as creating and restoring instruments for the Museum of Fine Arts Boston] and folk musicians. Self-taught luthier, he began constructing ouds, sazes, Renaissance-type lutes, and even bows. His vihuela, a 15th-16th century Spanish forerunner of today's guitar, was admired and played by many classical guitarists, and featured in a 1954 concert Court Music Of The Spanish Renaissance at the Museum of Fine Arts. Throughout his life, he continued to indulge his passion for building violins as well as other exotic instruments. In the early 90s he took time to self-publish his deeply researched theory illuminating the mystery of the brilliant tonal quality of Stradivarius and other Cremonese fiddle-makers. Observations On The Reasons For The Cremona Tone appeared in the January 1994 bulletin of the Southern California Violin Makers, with the convincing and tested argument that burnishing the wood face of instruments prior to varnishing created a compressed, non-spongy, and more resonant soundboard, and consequent tonal brilliance and richness.

== Middle years ==
=== Sculpting ===
For the next 6 decades, Gibran mostly concentrated on sculpture. Experimenting with metal, he constructed his initial figures from wire found while beachcombing in Nantucket; soon he was combining this technique with thermal metal spraying. By the mid-fifties, Gibran enrolled in Boston's Wentworth Institute of Technology where he learned the oxy-acetylene welding process. Within months, he had begun work on his first major welded figure John the Baptist voted "Most Popular" in the 1956 Boston Arts Festival and named “a show stopper and crowd-collector” by the Boston Globe’s Edgar Driscoll. Gibran explained the process of creating John the Baptist years later in Sculpture Review in a paragraph reminiscent of Michelangelo's statement that a sculpture was simply waiting to be released from within the block of marble: "John the Baptist, my first welded figure grew out of a fascination for a jumble of baling wire discovered on a Boston wharf. [n.b.: The same wharf where today’s Institute of Contemporary Art is located]. His staff – a tie rod for piers – was eroded by the sea into a most beautifully organic and tactile iron length. The figure was already there. All that was required was order. It was all there, the conceptual and the technical – the raw and primal qualities of John in the desert reflected through nature’s brutalization of man’s objects".

Voice in the Wilderness, a welded iron rod 7-foot figure received the George D. Widener Gold Medal at the Pennsylvania Academy Annual in 1958. A year later, Pieta exhibited at the eighth Boston Arts Festival received acclaim as articulated by The New York Times critic Stuart Preston: “This year’s Grand Prize in art was awarded to ... Gilbert Franklins’ Beach Figure ... but it must have been a close thing deciding between it and Kahlil Gibran's noble and expressive Pieta".

Concurrent with his welded figures, Gibran was accepting commissions for decorative works that at times were combinations of wood carving or of metal abstract extruded welded metal wall hangings. For one Chestnut Hill mansion designed by Walter Bogner and its adjacent pool house designed by Saltonstall and Morton, now included in a list of National Historic Buildings, Gibran executed a 100-foot welded Corten steel fence surrounding the swimming pool, doorknobs and other hand wrought architectural features throughout the home, culminating with his sculpture Javelier.

=== Publications ===
Sculpture/Kahlil Gibran published by The Bartlett Press in 1970, focused on the artist's welded iron and hammered steel works.

Once more, Gibran, turned to a completely different art form. With his second wife, Jean English Gibran, he spent three years co-authoring the definitive biography of his relative, Gibran Kahlil Gibran, the author of The Prophet. Kahlil Gibran His Life and World, published first by New York Graphic Society in 1974, and by Interlink in 1991, was an effort not only to separate his and the poet's identities, but also to present a well researched, accurate story of the adolescent's immersion in Boston's cultural life shortly after his arrival in 1895, and his meteoric rise in the world of arts and letters.

=== Commissions and monuments ===
Immediately after the appearance of the biography of his famous relative, Gibran abandoned welding, but branched out to several fields that had fascinated him.

A long time admirer and collector of medals, by 1977, Gibran's first effort relating to that medium was a bas relief portrait of his cousin for a monument sited in Copley Square across the main branch of the Boston Public Library. Sculpting in wax led to several commissions, including bas reliefs Cardinal Richard Cushing, Amy Beach, Elliot Norton medal and portrait heads Karon, Najwa, Nureyev, Self Portrait. Finally he had the time to fulfill a childhood promise to honor his parents Rose Gibran (her maiden name) and Nicholas Gibran. In 1981, Gibran's monumental sculpture, the 12 foot bronze Lady of the Cedars of Lebanon, was placed on a high Jamaica Plain hill on a Roxbury puddingstone ledge, at the site of the Maronite Church to which the family belonged.

== Later years ==
=== Inventing ===
The eighties and nineties brought more exposure to Gibran as a multi-faceted creator. Returning to drawing, his mixed media works were featured in several Boston-area galleries including the Cambridge Arts Association, Obelisk Gallery, Pierce Galleries, and the Copley Society where he became a Copley Master. By 1989, during a solo exhibit at Esthetix Gallery on Boston's State Street, the Boston Sunday Globe’s Mark Wilson characterized him as:

"A drawer, a painter, a collector, a photographer, a lens maker (he made his own 600 mm f/4.5 telephoto lens for his Nikon), a restorer of musical instruments, a craftsman, an inventor (he has new designs for a furnace, a shotgun shell and a screw driver) and an avid pool player. ‘I go to bed making pool shots in my head,’ he says. ‘I play for the inner game.’ ”

Although he neglected to mention Gibran as jewelry maker and furniture designer, Wilson did describe the Gibran Tripod that he and Chris Casgrande began to manufacture and distribute to institutions, including The Museum of Modern Art gift shop. Like the pool cues he made, the leather belts he fashioned, Gibran’s design for this object was sleek and described as “one brilliant new American product” that during its display at the German Photokina exhibit “had the French, the Germans, and the Italians slavering".

=== Forest Hills Cemetery and donations ===
It was also during the late nineties that Gibran more or less left the competitive art world. Just steps away from his South End studio, West Canton Street Child presided over Hayes Park. For the first time in his life, he deliberately avoided publicity, explaining to one neighbor who successfully interviewed him: “I live in a world here that’s very different. When we bought this house I created sort of a haven, I equipped it with all the tools that I need, and it takes up all my time".

Within the South End art world, Gibran formed close ties with local artists including his Museum School classmate and member of the Boston art group Direct Vision Francesco Carbone, painter Steven Trefonides, and photographers Morton Bartlett, Marie Cosindas and David Robinson.

Along with his studio, Boston's Forest Hills Cemetery had symbolized escape for Gibran ever since he was a boy roaming its rural paths. In Susan Wilson's Garden of Memories, he recalled how meaningful the space was: “Forest Hills had a quiet solitude and magic...I walked through the gates, and it was MINE, all mine". At the turn of the 21st century shortly after the creation of his double-figure, Into the Millennium, Gibran became involved in the Forest Hills Educational Trust. His Seated Ceres joined other contemporary art on its Sculpture Path.

Gibran gave Seated Ceres to the cemetery. It was featured in a New York Times slide show in January 2008, and its presence, seated on the shore of Lake Hibiscus, became a beloved icon.

=== Last years ===
Gibran's last four years were spent giving back to the community. The Jean and Kahlil Gibran Collection was shown at Framingham's Danforth Museum of Art in 2002. The exhibit included Gibran's many Boston colleagues – often under-represented painters, photographers, and sculptors – whom he and his wife had collected throughout the decades.

The donation of these works to Danforth, a local museum that respects and continues to show neglected Boston artists, was soon followed by the couple's quest to find an eventual permanent home for their Gibran Kahlil Gibran archive of paintings, correspondence, and documents that they had carefully collected and nurtured. Helping and supporting this plan were long time friends, art historians, dealers, and writers Stuart and Beverly Denenberg. Publishing a confidential digital catalog of the Gibran Kahlil Gibran Collection, the Gibrans and Denenbergs determined that among the several institutions interested in acquiring the collection was Mexico City's Museo Soumaya, This institute provided the space, security, curatorial staff, scholars, and passion to care for the works and possessions of the poet. On October 21, 2007, the archive was placed in that museum's care.

Shortly after, Jean and Kahlil Gibran made another special donation when their vast collection of European and American medals was accepted by the Los Angeles County Museum.

A major exhibition of Gibran's work was shown at Boston's St. Botolph Club during September and October 2007. The curators of this retrospective As a Man/ Kahlil Gibran, selected forty-five examples, including paintings, musical instruments, sculpture, drawings, inventions, and books. With a stunning catalog, champagne toasts, and the violinist Joo-Mee Lee playing Gibran's violins, the opening reception resounded with applause. Stuart Denenberg read This Kahlil Gibran a praise poem honoring his friend of more than forty years.

== Death and legacy ==
On April 13, 2008, at the age of 85, Gibran died suddenly of congestive heart failure at Massachusetts General Hospital. Obituaries also paid tribute. His final resting place at Forest Hills Cemetery was marked by Boy with a Dove the young figure from Into the Millennium. Exactly three months after his death, Seated Ceres was stolen from her Forest Hills site. Though stunned and horrified by this act of vandalism, Gibran's family and Forest Hills Educational Trust administrators collaborated to replace this figure with a Standing Ceres that was installed and dedicated on August 15, 2008, at a spot in the cemetery park that Gibran loved best.

On April 26, 2014, Gibran's bronze sculpture Ad Astra was dedicated at Childe Hassam Park located on the corner of Columbus Avenue and Chandler Street in Boston's historic South End Neighborhood.

Love Made Visible by Jean Gibran, with a foreword by critic Charles Giuliano and an afterword by Katherine French Director of the Danforth Museum, tells the story of Scenes from a Mostly Happy Marriage while paying tribute to the exciting Boston art scene that flourished in that city during last half of the 20th century.

In January 2017, Interlink Press published Gibran's & his wife's revision of their biography of Gibran Kahlil Gibran. Kahlil Gibran Beyond Borders features more than 200 black and white and color illustrations related to the poet's life and received positive reviews including one by Magda Abu-Fadi from the Huffington Post.

Articles about the sculptor still reveal his reputation as “Golden Hands.” Echoing the 2007 St. Botolph Catalogue that recorded his close friends’ tributes to him is an essay by Joseph Steinfield published in July 2017. The Monadnock Ledger recalls Gibran's love affair with materials.

Boston Globe Art Critic Cate McQuaid's Visionary Boston celebrates undersung trio at Danforth Art Museum and excellently describes Kahlil G. Gibran as an active Boston Expressionist.

== Collections and shows (1953–2023) ==
1. Bloomfield Art Association
2. Boston Arts Festival
3. Chicago Art Institute
4. Houston Museum
5. National Academy
6. National Institute of Arts and Letters
7. Pennsylvania Academy
8. Portland Art Festival
9. Jaques Seligmann Gallery
10. Utica Museum
11. Art USA
12. Washington Cathedral
13. Whitney Annual
14. Yale University
15. Montreal Museum of Fine Arts
16. Fuller Art Center, Brockton, MA
17. Tennessee Fine Arts Center, Nashville
18. Swope Art Gallery, Terre Haute, IN
19. Wm. Rockhill Nelson Gallery, Kansas City, MO
20. Obelisk Gallery, Boston
21. Shore Gallery, Boston & Provincetown
22. Ward-Nasse Gallery, Boston
23. Lee Nordness Gallery, Boston
24. Southwest Harbor Galleries, Boston
25. Cambridge Art Association
26. Boston Center for the Arts
27. Provincetown Fine Arts Center
28. Boston Athenaeum
29. Elmira College, NY
30. Bologna Landi Gallery, Easthampton, LI
31. Esthetix Gallery, Boston
32. La Posada, Santa Fe, NM
33. Springfield Museum of Fine Arts
34. Pierce Galleries, Hingham, MA
35. Duxbury Fine Arts Complex
36. The Gallery at India Street, Nantucket
37. Ann Woods Ltd. Charlottesville, VA
38. Aura Gallery, Santa Fe, NM
39. French Library
40. Provincetown Art Association
41. Forest Hills Cemetery
42. Copley Society of Boston
43. Denenberg Fine Arts, West Hollywood, CA
44. The Saint Botolph Club, Boston, MA
45. Ogunquit Museum.
46. Danforth Museum,

== Accolades ==
Recipient of two John Simon Guggenheim Fellowships in 1959 and 1960, along with a National Institute of Arts and Letters Award in 1961, Gibran began exhibiting his growing body of sculpture in museums and galleries throughout the nation. By 1962, Brian O’Doherty of The New York Times described his one-man sculpture show at New York's Lee Nordness Gallery and suggested that “every sculptor should see this “tour de force”. Two years later his Young Trunk received the Grand Prize at the Boston Arts Festival, followed by the John Gregory Award for Sculpture from the National Sculpture Society and the gold medal for Excellence at the International Show of Religious Art in Trieste, Italy. The Boston Globe magazine featured him in 1967 when author Gregory McDonald concluded: “Removing the confusion, the mysticism from the name Kahlil Gibran, leaves in this generation, a sculptor of extraordinary poetic power, utterly concerned with his art, with the double nature that is utterly human, as paradoxical as himself, and, a man with a singular future". In 1974, he was elected into the National Academy of Design as an Associate Academician.

Awards include:

- 1959 Popular Award and 1960 Grand Prize, Boston Arts Festival,
- 1958 George Widener Gold Medal, Pennsylvania Academy of the Fine Arts
- 1959 John Simon Guggenheim Fellowship,
- 1960 John Simon Guggenheim Fellowship,
- 1961 National Institute of Arts and Letters Award,
- 1965 John Gregory Award, National Sculpture Society,
- 1966 Gold Medal, International Exhibit, Trieste, Italy,
- 1992 Citation of Merit, Massachusetts Horticultural Society

== See also ==
- List of American artists 1900 and after
- Boston Expressionism
