= Jason Berger =

American painter (1924–2010)

- Born: January 22, 1924; Malden, Massachusetts, U.S.
- Died: October 17, 2010 (aged 86)
- Education: School of the Museum of Fine Arts, Boston
- Known for: Painting; Woodcut
- Movement: Boston Expressionism
- Spouses: Marilyn Powers (died 1976) Estela Couto (m. 1978; died 1997) Leena Rekola (m. 1999)

Jason Berger (January 22, 1924 – October 17, 2010) was a Boston landscape painter, connected to Boston Expressionism . He painted from nature, en plein air, and used favorite motifs in abstract paintings, referred to as "studio paintings". He, also, enjoyed woodcuts which were predominantly printed in black and white. Known for his humor, love of jazz, and his upbeat approach to painting, “his work expresses the joy of life and love of place”.

== Biography ==
Born in Malden, Massachusetts, Berger was the son of first-generation Jews from Lithuania and Latvia, on his mother's side, and from Russia and Lithuania on his father's side. Speaking only Yiddish till the age of three, he grew up in the Boston suburbs and attended Roxbury Memorial High School. Encouraged by his mother and uncle, J.P.Savel, illustrator for the Boston Post, Berger's interest and passion in painting were evident very early. As a teen in the mid-nineteen thirties, he painted en plein air regularly emulating the influences he saw in Boston. His love of the old masters, the immediate approach of the watercolors of John Singer Sargent and Winslow Homer, and the current trends of Modernism, Cubism and Abstraction were the influences that would stay with him throughout his life.

At a young age, he frequented the Museum of Fine Arts of Boston and haunted the Boston Public Library, reading all he could on painting and painting techniques. His focus on painting was recognized during high school by acceptance to the “Vocational Art Classes” at the Museum of Fine Arts of Boston where he studied drawing and composition in the afternoons. With this preparation, he received a full scholarship to the School of the Museum of Fine Arts of Boston in 1941. Karl Zerbe, the principle painting teacher at the school, thought Berger and his classmates, Reed Kay, Jack Kramer, David Aronson, and George Sheridan were among best students.

Karl Zerbe, a German citizen, received his position at the Museum School in 1937 after a year at Harvard University. Like Hans Hofmann, who immigrated in the 1930s to New York City, Karl Zerbe brought the tenets of European Modernism to Boston. “For eager young Americans, most of whom had traveled little—and constrained in the 1930s by the Depression and in the 1940s by World War II and its aftermath—contact with Hofmann (and Zerbe) served as an invaluable alternative for direct contact with the European sources of Modernism”.

Unlike Hoffman, whose emphasis was in abstraction and initiated the Abstract Expressionists, Zerbe was well rooted in the expressionism and spawned the Boston Expressionists. Associated with the Boston Expressionists are Jack Levine, Hyman Bloom, Khalil Gibran, as well as, Zerbe's students-Jason Berger, David Aronson, Reed Kay, Jack Kramer, Bernie Chaet, Arthur Polonsky, and George Sheridan. In the 1940s, the Expressionist enthusiasm in Boston would materialize in exhibitions of Max Beckmann, Chaïm Soutine, Oskar Kokoschka, Marc Chagall, and James Ensor before they were exhibited in New York City.

World War II interrupted Berger's college education with three years in the Army, 1943–1946. Returning from the war, he graduated from college in 1948. Afterwards, with a traveling scholarship awarded by the School of the Museum of Fine Art, Boston, Berger went to Europe with his first wife, the painter Marilyn Powers. In addition to the European Traveling Fellowship, Berger received several awards, including the Grand Prize for Painting from Jacques Lipchitz at the Boston Arts Festival in 1956 and the Clarissa Bartlett Traveling Award in 1957. While in France, Berger studied with cubist sculptor Ossip Zadkine in Paris and frequented Georges Braque's studio. He also met Matisse and absorbed the direct influences of Bonnard, Dufy, Picasso and Soutine.

Upon his return to the United States, Berger began teaching first at Mount Holyoke College (1955), and then enjoyed a long tenure teaching at the School of the Museum of Fine Arts, Boston (1956–69). He taught briefly at Wellesley College (1957–59), The State University of New York at Buffalo (1969–70) and The Metropolitan College at Boston University (1971–72). Until his retirement, he taught at The Art Institute of Boston (1973–88).

During the summers, the Bergers traveled and painted en plein air in France, Mexico and Portugal. After his wife, Marilyn Powers, died in 1976 of cancer, he returned to Portugal where he met Estela Couto who became his second wife in 1978. They eventually moved to Portugal in 1994. Berger lost his second wife, Estela, in 1997. Berger remained in Portugal, where he eventually married the painter Leena Rekola in 1999. The couple moved back to Boston in March 2008. He died in October 2010.

Berger continued to work directly from nature until his death, always putting the "picture first and feeding nature into it". This focus on combining the formal elements of color, shape and compositional scheme to make a good picture, never interfered with an overall joy of discovery through the act of painting. His approach was direct, his vision clear, and his paintings full of structural elegance, with the results a positive and optimistic expression.

== Collections ==
Berger's work is in the permanent collections of:

- Museum of Modern Art, New York
- Solomon R. Guggenheim Museum, New York
- Museum of Fine Arts, Boston
- Sheraton Boston Hotel
- Chase National Bank, New York
- Danforth Art Museum, Framingham, Massachusetts
- Hoyt Institute of Fine Arts, New Castle, Pennsylvania
- Rockefeller Medical Center, New York
- Rose Art Museum, Brandeis University, Waltham, Massachusetts
- Simmons College, Boston
- Smith College Museum of Art, Northampton, Massachusetts
- Jane Voorhees Zimmerli Art Museum, Rutgers University, New Brunswick, New Jersey

== Exhibitions ==
A prolific painter, Berger began exhibiting while still a student with Boris Mirski Gallery and Swetzoff Gallery, as well as the Institute of Modern Art (now Institute of Contemporary Art, Boston). The latter gave him a solo exhibition in 1950. The artist has also exhibited in a number of museums, including the Art Institute of Chicago; Museum of Modern Art, NYC ; Addison Gallery of American Art, Andover, MA; Danforth Museum of Art, Framingham, MA; DeCordova Museum and Sculpture Park, Lincoln, MA; Fitchburg Museum of Art, Fitchburg, MA; Smith College Museum of Art, Northampton, MA; Worcester Museum of Art, Worcester, MA. He has also exhibited widely in France, Mexico and Portugal.
