= Barbara Swan =

American painter

- Sanary, 1951 (self-portrait of Swan)
- Born: 1922; Newton, Massachusetts, U.S.
- Died: 2003 (aged 80–81); Brighton, Massachusetts, U.S.
- Known for: Painting; Illustration; Lithography
- Spouse: Alan Fink

Barbara Swan (1922–2003), also known by her married name, Barbara Swan Fink, was an American painter, illustrator, and lithographer. Her early work is associated with the Boston Expressionist school; later she became known for her still-life paintings in which light is refracted through glass and water, and for her portraits. She is also known for her collaboration with the poets Anne Sexton and Maxine Kumin, and for her archived correspondence with various artists and writers.

== Life and career ==
Barbara Swan was born in Newton, Massachusetts, in 1922. She graduated from Wellesley College in 1943 with a B.A. in art history, then studied painting at the School of the Museum of Fine Arts until 1948. In her last year at the museum school she was Karl Zerbe's teaching assistant. She spent two years living and working in France on a fellowship from the Museum of Fine Arts, at a time when two-year traveling fellowships were rarely awarded to women. There she met her husband, Alan Fink, whom she married in 1952. Fink later founded the Alpha Gallery on Newbury Street in Boston.

Swan achieved local fame as an artist in the 1950s. Her paintings from this period are loosely associated with the Boston Expressionist school, although her themes tended to be gentler than those of Jack Levine and others working in that style. In a 1957 review of her show at the Boris Mirski Gallery, critic Edgar Driscoll marveled at her ability to render tranquil domestic scenes, featuring sleeping children or nursing infants, in a creative way: "It is a tender, touching showing...Yet the artist, through strong color and off-beat compositions, carefully avoids over-sentimentalizing or slipping into the banal." One of her best known paintings from this period, "Baby", shows her infant son Aaron held up by a man's hand, presumably her husband's.

At various times in the 1940s through the 1960s, Swan taught art classes at Boston University, Wellesley College, and the museum school.

=== Collaboration with Anne Sexton and Maxine Kumin ===
In 1961 Swan was one of the first women to receive a grant from the Radcliffe Institute for Independent Study. Through the grant program she met other creative women, including the poets Anne Sexton and Maxine Kumin. Swan provided pen and ink illustrations for several of Sexton's books, including Transformations, The Death Notebooks, and Live or Die, the last of which won the Pulitzer Prize for Poetry. She also illustrated Kumin's Pulitzer-winning Up Country.

Swan's essay on Sexton, "A Reminiscence", is included in Anne Sexton: Telling the Tale, a collection of essays published in 1988. In the essay Swan recalls, among other things, how her lithograph, The Musicians, inspired Sexton's poem, "To Lose the Earth", and her drawing, Man Carrying a Man, inspired Sexton's "Jesus Walking".

Critic Vernon Young, reviewing Transformations in 1972, wrote, "The drawings of Barbara Swan incisively complement the poems. Their designs are what they should be: importunate and macabre; Gothic and placental."

At least one critic found Swan's illustrations distastefully female. John N. Morris, reviewing Up Country in 1974, called them "prettifications" and complained that "they draw too much attention to the slightly ladylike quality of a few of these poems, the air they have of essays in the female georgic."

=== Portraiture ===
Swan drew and painted portraits of Sexton, concert pianist Luise Vosgerchian, writer Tillie Olsen, historian James F. O'Gorman, composer Arthur Berger, and artists Sigmund Abeles, Gregory Gillespie, Harold Tovish, and Esther Geller, among others. According to her husband, she always started her portraits with the eyes.

=== Later years ===
Swan continued painting and exhibiting into her seventies. In 1995 her work was included in Boston's Honored Artists: Still Working, a tribute to senior artists at the Danforth Art Museum. A reviewer called her still lifes "intense". In many of her later paintings, images are distorted as light is refracted through glass and water.

She died on June 2, 2003, at the Kindred Hospital in Brighton, Massachusetts.

Swan's work is included in the permanent collections of museums and galleries throughout the U.S. Her archived correspondence includes letters from, and photographs of, many notable artists and writers, including Bernard Chaet, Ellsworth Kelly, Maxine Kumin, Tillie Olsen, Anne Sexton, Andrew Stevovich, and Elbert Weinberg.

Swan's son, Aaron Fink, is also a painter whose work has been exhibited widely.

== Grants and awards ==
- Alumnae Achievement Award, Wellesley College, 1996
- George Roth Prize, Philadelphia Print Club, 1965
- Institute for Independent Study, Radcliffe College, Associate Scholar, 1962, 1961
- Pintner Award, Cambridge Art Association, 1960, 1958, 1957
- Albert Whitin Traveling Fellowship, Museum of Fine Arts, Boston, 1948

== Selected solo exhibitions ==
- Barbara Swan: Reflected Self, Danforth Museum, 2013
- Barbara Swan: Portraits and Still Lifes, Museum of Art, University of New Hampshire, 2012
- Barbara Swan: A Retrospective of Drawings, Boston Public Library, 1993
- Addison Gallery of American Art, 1973
- Boris Mirski Gallery, Boston, 1965, 1963, 1957, 1953

== Selected group exhibitions ==
- The Expressive Voice, Danforth Museum, 2011-2012
- Painting in Boston: 1950-2000, DeCordova Museum and Sculpture Park, 2002
- Against the Grain: The Second Generation of Boston Expressionism, University of New Hampshire, 2000
- New England Artists Working on Paper, Museum of Fine Arts, Boston, 1980
- Contemporary American Painting, University of Illinois, 1950

== Selected collections ==
- Addison Gallery of American Art, Andover, MA
- Fogg Museum, Cambridge, MA
- Museum of Fine Arts, Boston, MA
- National Portrait Gallery, Washington, D.C.
- Philadelphia Museum of Art, Philadelphia, PA
