= Boston Expressionism =

Arts movement

Boston Expressionism is an art movement marked by emotional directness, dark humor, social and spiritual themes, and a tendency toward figuration strong enough that Boston Figurative Expressionism is sometimes used as an alternate term to distinguish it from abstract expressionism, with which it overlapped.

Strongly influenced by German Expressionism and by the immigrant, and often Jewish, experience, the movement originated in Boston, Massachusetts, in the 1930s, continues in a third-wave form today, and flourished most markedly from the 1950s until the 1970s.

Most commonly associated with emotionality, and the bold color choices and expressive brushwork of painters central to the movement like Hyman Bloom, Jack Levine and Karl Zerbe, Boston Expressionism is also heavily associated with virtuoso technical skills and the revival of old master technique. The work of sculptor Harold Tovish, which spanned bronze, wood and synthetics is one example of the former, while the gold- and silverpoint found in some of Joyce Reopel's early work exemplify the latter.

== Origin ==
"Christmas Tree" by Hyman Bloom, 1945

=== Hyman Bloom and Jack Levine ===
Hyman Bloom and Jack Levine, both key figures in the movement, shared similar roots. Both grew up in immigrant communities: Bloom in the slums of Boston's West End and Levine in the South End. In the 1930s, having attended settlement house art classes as children, both won fine arts scholarships and trained at the Fogg Museum with Denman Ross. Both also drew on their Eastern European Jewish heritage, and were strongly influenced by the "starkness and angst" of German Expressionism and by then contemporary Jewish painters, such as Chagall and Soutine. Bloom tended to explore spiritual themes, while Levine was more inclined toward social commentary and dark humor, but both came to prominence in 1942 when they were included in Americans 1942: 18 Artists from 9 States, a Museum of Modern Art exhibition curated by Dorothy Miller. Soon afterward, Time magazine called Bloom "one of the most striking of U.S. Colorists," and Levine won a prize at an exhibit in the Metropolitan Museum in New York. Together, they were referred to as "the bad boys of Boston."

=== Karl Zerbe ===
"Street Scene #2" by Jack Levine, 1938

Another influential artist at the time was Karl Zerbe, a painter from Germany who had studied in Italy and whose early work had been condemned by the Nazis as "degenerate". Zerbe emigrated to the United States in 1934, settling in Boston where he headed the Department of Painting at the School of the Museum of Fine Arts. Zerbe helped reinvigorate the staid Boston art scene by bringing European ideas, particularly those of the German Expressionists, to Boston. He arranged for Max Beckmann and Oskar Kokoschka, among others, to lecture at the museum school.

=== The Early "Boston Expressionists" ===
By the early 1950s, Bloom, Levine, and Zerbe and the artists they influenced had been dubbed the Boston Expressionists. Confusingly, they were also sometimes referred to as the Boston School, a name typically used to reference another, older, Boston-based group.

Each of these three artists had his own style, yet they shared certain tendencies. They did not paint directly from observation, but from memory and imagination; as Bernard Chaet put it, they favored "the conceptual over the perceptual". Like the Abstract Expressionists, they rejected the photographic naturalism preferred by the Nazis; and, Willem de Kooning and Jackson Pollock, who had seen Bloom's work in Americans 1942, considered Bloom "the first Abstract Expressionist artist in America." Yet Bloom never embraced pure abstraction and, to varying degrees, Bloom, Levine, and Zerbe also painted figuratively, which is why their school of painting, in particular, is sometimes referred to as "Boston figurative expressionism."

The three, like the movement as a whole, were known for their technical expertise. Like the Abstract Expressionists, they were painterly, treating the paint itself, and not just its color, as a meaningful element. Known for their experimentation with new media, they were also known for their interest in methodology through the ages, thus Zerbe, for example, helped revive the ancient Egyptian medium of encaustic, a mixture of pigment and hot wax, in the 1940s.

Chaet called Bloom the link between Boston Expressionism and Abstract Expressionism. Bloom's Christmas Tree (1945) is an example of one of his more abstract works, barely suggesting the appearance of the original object by its shape. Levine's Street Scene #2 (1938), with its hint of danger and corruption, is an example of Levine's characteristic themes and of the painterly brushwork and distorted yet skillfully rendered figures that were characteristic of Boston Expressionism.

== Later Generations ==
Bloom, Levine, and Zerbe influenced a second generation of painters, many of them first- or second-generation Jewish immigrants, and many of them students of Zerbe's at the museum school. In a 1947 photo taken by John Brook at the Thirty Massachusetts Painters exhibition at the Institute of Modern Art, Zerbe is pictured with artists Carl Pickhardt, Reed Champion, Kahlil Gibran, John Northey, Esther Geller, Thomas Fransioli, Ture Bengtz, Giglio Dante, Maud Morgan, and Lawrence Kupferman. (In her memoir, Jean Gibran noted the photo's resemblance to the iconic Life magazine photo of "The Irascibles," taken in 1950, and adds, "But the true 'irascibles' were the Boston artists.") Other artists in this group included David Aronson, Jason Berger, Bernard Chaet, Reed Kay, Jack Kramer, Arthur Polonsky, Henry Schwartz, Barbara Swan, Mel Zabarsky, Lois Tarlow, and Arnold Trachtman. Mitchell Siporin, who directed the Department of Fine Arts at Brandeis University in the 1950s, is sometimes included in this category.

To some extent, many of these young artists were outsiders at the museum school, with its links to the Boston Brahmin establishment and its emphasis on traditional techniques. Looking back on his days there, Arthur Polonsky recalled an unspoken agreement among his classmates that there was something missing from the "academic" paintings of the Boston School, on the one hand, and the sterile "geometric purism" of some newer artists on the other. Bloom, Levine, and Zerbe helped many of them find an alternative path. Zerbe introduced them not only to German artists such as Grosz and Dix, but also to Mexican artists such as Rivera and Siqueiros. At the same time they continued to follow a rigorous program of traditional art education, studying the old masters of Europe as well as anatomy and perspective. There was a strong emphasis on drawing. As their skills developed, many students adopted a figurative approach with the understanding that an artist was not a reporter. "We tormented the subject matter," Polonsky said. Many of their paintings were concerned with human suffering, rendered without the cool, ironic detachment that later seemed to become obligatory in treating such subjects.

"The Last Supper" by David Aronson, 1944

One of the most successful artists to emerge from this group was David Aronson. In 1946 his "Trinity" and "The Last Supper" were included in Dorothy Miller's Fourteen Americans exhibition at MoMA, where they elicited both praise and indignation. One Boston critic denounced "The Last Supper" as "a footboard for the devil's bed". Aronson went on to direct the Fine Art Department at Boston University, and his work is widely exhibited and collected.

Later artists influenced by Boston Expressionism include Aaron Fink, Gerry Bergstein, Jon Imber, Michael Mazur, Katherine Porter, Jane Smaldone, John Walker, and others. Philip Guston, who had ties to Boston, and whose return to representational art in the 1970s was a source of controversy, is often mentioned in connection with Boston Expressionism.

== Philosophy ==
According to art historian Judith Bookbinder, "Boston figurative expressionism was both a humanist philosophy—that is, a human-centered and rationalist or classically oriented philosophy—and a formal approach to the handling of paint and space." Pamela Edwards Allara of the Fine Arts Department at Tufts University calls Boston Expressionism a belief system created in context: "It is the evidence of a consistent set of assumptions about the function of art, which has been molded by the city's cultural climate."

Art critic Robert Taylor, writing in 1979, suggested that the "Boston attitudes" derived from Bloom's and Levine's religious background. Having received their early art instruction in a religious community center, he reasoned, it was not surprising that their work would evince a certain respect for tradition and discipline. Conversely, art historian Alfred Werner suggested in 1973 that Jewish immigrants fleeing oppression were freer to embrace modernism than other Americans because they were "less chained to a genteel tradition".

== Reception ==
In the 1930s, Boston was notoriously conservative when it came to the arts. Even slight abstraction or imaginative use of color was unacceptable to most Boston critics and collectors, including the Museum of Fine Arts, and impressionists such as Edmund C. Tarbell and Frank Benson were still seen as cutting-edge. In this atmosphere, modern artists in Boston received little encouragement locally, and had to look to New York for support. A few notable exceptions were the Addison Gallery and the Busch-Reisinger Museum, and the art critic Dorothy Adlow, who supported the movement from its earliest days.

In the forties, thanks in large part to Bloom and Levine and their New York successes, and to Zerbe's influence on his students, the art scene in Boston began to open up. National magazines such as Time, Life, and ARTnews took notice. The Boris Mirski Gallery opened on Newbury Street, and hosted exchange shows with Edith Halpert's Downtown Gallery in New York. In 1945, Adlow wrote, "Until a few years ago, Boston was artistically moribund...In the last dozen years, however, there has been an upsurge in Boston art life. A pronounced superiority in technical skill and a zestful creative buoyancy have attracted widespread interest."

Despite these developments, many Boston collectors remained suspicious of modern art, and the Museum of Fine Arts remained unsupportive. Anti-Semitism may have been a factor, given that the Boston Expressionists were predominantly Jewish. At the same time, the New York painters, influenced by the School of Paris, were moving in a different direction: not just distorting figures for expressive purposes, but eschewing figuration altogether. Neglected at home and out of step with New York, Boston Expressionism fell out of favor in the 1960s and received little attention from art historians in the succeeding decades.

More recently, Boston-area exhibitions and the publication of several books and articles have generated some renewed interest. In 2005, Judith Bookbinder published a book on the subject, Boston Modern: Figurative Expressionism as Alternative Modernism. Angelica Brisk's 2009 documentary on Bloom, The Beauty of All Things, was well received, and a film by Gabriel Polonsky about his father Arthur Polonsky, Release from Reason, is currently in production. Jean Gibran, wife of the artist "Kahlil Gibran"., recalls the burgeoning Boston Expressionist art scene in her 2014 memoir, Love Made Visible: Scenes from a Mostly Happy Marriage.

The Danforth Museum in Framingham, Massachusetts, maintains a large collection of Boston Expressionist art. Reviewing a 2011 exhibit at the Danforth, Boston Globe art critic Cate McQuaid wrote, "Boston Expressionism has always been luscious, bright, and deeply felt."
