= Aaron Fink =

Aaron Fink may refer to:

- Aaron Fink (musician), former guitarist of Breaking Benjamin
- Aaron Fink (artist) (born 1955), American artist
