= Esther Geller =

American painter

- Born: October 26, 1921; Boston, Massachusetts, U.S.
- Died: October 22, 2015 (aged 93); Boston, Massachusetts, U.S.
- Education: School of the Museum of Fine Arts, Boston
- Known for: Encaustic painting
- Movement: Abstract Expressionism
- Spouse: Harold Shapero

Esther Geller (October 26, 1921 – October 22, 2015) was an American painter mainly associated with the abstract expressionist movement in Boston in the 1940s and 1950s. She was one of the foremost authorities on encaustic painting techniques.

== Life and career ==
Geller studied at the School of the Museum of Fine Arts, Boston in 1921, and later taught there with Karl Zerbe from 1943 to 1944. It was at the Museum School that she began painting with encaustic, a mixture of pigment and hot wax. She first received acclaim as a painter of "organic abstractions" in the 1940s when she exhibited with a group of other emerging artists later known as the Boston Expressionists. Her work was more abstract than that of Zerbe and other Boston figurative expressionists.

After marrying the composer Harold Shapero in 1945, Geller continued painting and exhibiting, and taught art classes at the DeCordova Museum in Lincoln, Massachusetts. She was active as a painter for over seventy years.

In 2012 her encaustics were shown in a major exhibit, The Future of the Past: Encaustic Art in the 21st Century, at the Mills Gallery in Boston. The exhibit also included a video demonstration by Karl Zerbe and an interview with Geller. Her works are included in the permanent collections of the Boston Museum of Fine Arts, the Addison Gallery of American Art, the Danforth Museum, and the DeCordova Museum.

On October 22, 2015, Geller died at the age of 93.

== Influence ==
Art historian Judith Bookbinder names Geller, along with David Aronson and others, as one of the emerging artists in the 1940s who influenced the direction of modern art in Boston. In 2002, Geller's early work was included in The Visionary Decade: New Voices in Art in 1940s Boston at Boston University, a retrospective of the vibrant art scene in postwar Boston. Jean Gibran, wife of the artist Kahlil Gibran, names Geller as one those "who have contributed in unique ways to the flowering of Boston Expressionism."

Geller was a leading expert on encaustic painting who experimented with the medium and developed her own methods, which she used and taught for decades. An interview in which she discussed her methods was featured in Arts magazine in 1957, and she has contributed to books on the subject.
