= Reed Champion =

American artist and illustrator

- Born: c. December 1909; Newton, Massachusetts, U.S.
- Died: December 5, 1997; Hyannis, Massachusetts, U.S.
- Education: School of the Museum of Fine Arts, Boston
- Spouse: James F. Pfeufer

Reed Champion (c. 1910–1997) was an American artist and illustrator. She was also known by her married name, Reed Pfeufer, and sometimes used the pseudonym John Corvus.

== Biography ==
Champion was born c. 1910 in Newton, Massachusetts, the daughter of William Julius Champion who founded the Kalah board game company, and Alice Viola Champion, a grassroots organizer and founder of the Harwich Children's Theater on Cape Cod. Raised in the Quaker religion, she attended the Moses Brown School in Providence, Rhode Island. She later studied painting under a scholarship to the Museum School in Boston.

During the 1930s and 40s she was loosely associated with the Boston Expressionism school of painting. During the Works Projects Administration (WPA), she was secretary of the Boston Artists' and Writers' Union. In 1947, she was included in "Thirty Massachusetts Painters," an exhibition at the Institute of Contemporary Art in Boston, along with Jack Levine, Maud Morgan, Karl Zerbe, and other Boston area artists. She illustrated numerous children's books for Houghton Mifflin, United Church Press, and other publishers, and worked as a commercial artist. She designed the poster for the first Newport Jazz Festival in 1954. In the late 1940s she was a mentor to Fernando Zóbel de Ayala y Montojo, then a student at Harvard.

Champion's paintings and prints have been exhibited at the Horticultural Hall, the Chicago Art Institute, the Cincinnati Museum of Art, the Cape Cod Museum of Art, and other venues. Her work is included in the permanent collection of the Cape Cod Museum and many private collections.

Champion married James F. Pfeufer, also an artist, c. 1935. The couple had three children. The family frequently spent time on Cape Cod, moving permanently to Brewster, Massachusetts, in 1972. Champion died of heart failure in Hyannis on December 5, 1997.
