= Bernard Chaet =

American painter (1924–2012)

Bernard Chaet (1924–2012) was an American artist; Chaet is known for his modernist paintings, his association with the Boston Expressionists, and his 40-year career as a professor of painting at Yale University. His works also include watercolors and prints. In 1994, he was named a National Academician by the National Academy of Design.

== Collections, awards, and exhibitions ==
Chaet's works are in the permanent collections of museums including: the Metropolitan Museum of Art in New York, the Museum of Fine Arts Boston, the Art Institute of Chicago, the Smithsonian American Art Museum in Washington, D.C., the Yale University Art Gallery in New Haven, CT, and the Addison Gallery of American Art in Andover, MA.

Chaet is the recipient of many awards including: the National Foundation of the Arts and Humanities, Sabbatical Grant in 1967–68, the National Academy of Fine Arts, Benjamin Altman Award in Painting in 1997, and the American Academy of Arts and Letters Jimmy Ernst Prize in 2001.

== Early life ==
Chaet was born and raised in the Dorchester neighborhood of Boston, MA. He completed a dual program at the Museum of Fine Arts, Boston—studying painting with Karl Zerbe—and Tufts University, graduating with a B.S. in 1949.

== Boston Expressionists ==
Chaet is known for his association as a first generation Boston Expressionist. Having studied with Zerbe, a father of Boston Expressionism, Chaet's early works certainly adhere to the techniques and philosophy of the school.

== Yale Professorship ==
Chaet began teaching in the Yale University Art Department in 1951 and continued to do so until his retirement in 1990. He was named the William Leffingwell Professor of Painting in 1979 and served as chairman of the Art Department.

== Publications ==
Chaet was a contributing editor to Arts Magazine, where he published the column "Studio Talk" for three years in the late 1950s. In 1960 he published the book Artists At Work, which features in depths conversations with artists Pat Adams, Anni Albers, Josef Albers, Al Blaustein, Hyman Bloom, James Brooks, Robert Engman, Esther Geller, Seymour Lipton, Conrad Marca-Relli, Gabor Peterdi, Irwin Rubin, Elbert Weinberg, and others, about their various materials and techniques.
