= Michael Mazur =

American painter

Michael Burton Mazur (1935 – August 18, 2009) was an American artist who was described by William Grimes of The New York Times as "a restlessly inventive printmaker, painter, and sculptor."

Born and raised in New York City, Mazur attended the Horace Mann School. He received a bachelor's degree from Amherst College in 1958, then studied art at Yale.

Mazur first gained notice for his series of lithographs and etchings of inmates in a mental asylum, which resulted in two publications, "Closed Ward" and "Locked Ward." Over the years, he worked in printmaking and painting. His series of large-scale prints for Dante's Inferno won critical acclaim, and were the subject of a traveling exhibition organized by the University of Iowa in 1994. Later he concentrated on creating large, lyrical paintings which make use of his free, gestural brushwork and a varied palette. Some of these paintings were seen in an exhibition of 2002 at Boston University, "Looking East: Brice Marden, Michael Mazur, and Pat Steir." See also Susan Danly's "Branching: The Art of Michael Mazur."

The Museum of Fine Arts, Boston, has acquired a definitive collection of Mazur's prints. Trudy V. Hansen authored a catalogue raisonne of Mazur's prints in 2000.

Mazur's work is owned by museums including the Art Institute of Chicago, the British Museum, The Fogg Museum, the Philadelphia Museum, Whitney Museum, the Yale Art Gallery, and the Iris & B. Gerald Cantor Center for Visual Arts at Stanford University.

He was long active as a teacher and supporter at the Fine Arts Work Center, Provincetown, Massachusetts.

He died of congestive heart failure.

== See also ==
- Boston Expressionism
