= Aaron Fink (artist) =

Aaron Fink (born March 10, 1955) is an artist working in a variety of mediums including oil, prints, sculpture and works on paper.

== Early life and education ==
Fink was born in Boston, Massachusetts. He is the son of artist Barbara Swan. He received a BFA from the Maryland Institute College of Art in Baltimore in 1977 and an MFA from Yale University in 1979.

== Career in art ==
Fink was an artist-in-residence at Anderson Ranch, Snowmass, Colorado, in 1996 and 1998. Fink received grants from the National Endowment for the Arts in 1982 and 1987. In 1984 he was awarded an Artist Fellowship from the Massachusetts Council on the Arts and Humanities, and in 1979 he was an Alternate in Painting for the Prix de Rome.

Fink in the early 1980s was part of a group of artists associated with a new wave of Boston Expressionism. His first solo exhibition was held at the Hayden Corridor Gallery at the Massachusetts Institute of Technology. His paintings often depict real-life objects embued with enhanced color and contrast for a super-lifelike effect.

== Publications ==
- Aaron Fink (2002). Aaron Fink: Out of the Ordinary. Hard Press Editions. ISBN 978-1-889097-61-9.

== Public collections ==
- Art Institute of Chicago
- Boston Public Library
- Brooklyn Museum of Art
- Danforth Museum of Art
- Danish House of Parliament
- Davis Museum, Wellesley College
- DeCordova Sculpture Park and Museum
- Farnsworth Museum
- Fogg Museum of Art, Harvard University
- Hara Museum
- Samuel P. Harn Museum, University of Florida, Gainesville
- Arthur J. Huntington Art Gallery, University of Texas, Austin
- Indianapolis Museum of Art
- Library of Congress
- Massachusetts Institute of Technology
- Metropolitan Museum of Art
- Museum of Contemporary Art, Chicago
- Museum of Fine Arts, Boston
- Museum of Modern Art, New York
- National Gallery of Art, Washington, DC
- New York Public Library
- Norton Gallery of Art
- Philadelphia Museum of Art
- Portland Museum of Art, Portland, Maine
- Roxbury Community College
- Scottsdale Museum of Contemporary Art
- Tufts University Art Gallery
- United States Department of State
- University of Massachusetts, Amherst
- Walker Art Center
- Worcester Art Museum
- Zimmerli Art Museum
