= Richard Yarde =

American painter (1939–2011)

- Born: 1939; Roxbury, Boston, Massachusetts
- Died: December 10, 2011 (aged 71–72); Northampton, Massachusetts
- Education: Boston University
- Known for: watercolors
- Awards: Common Wealth Award for Fine Art (2002) Academy Award in Art from the American Academy of Arts and Letters (1995)

Richard Yarde (1939–2011) was an American artist and professor, who specialized in watercolor painting.

== Biography ==
Richard Yarde's parents were immigrants. His father worked as a machinist and his mother was a seamstress. He recalled this as a source of inspiration, saying “There were patterns everywhere." Healing was a recurring theme in his works and he drew on the images from his own x-ray scans. He worked on oil paintings, then switched to watercolors in 1977 and received almost immediate critical acclaim for his works that drew upon themes of African-American history, Yarde's own family history, and his struggle with kidney failure and strokes.

Yarde taught art at Boston University, Wellesley College, Amherst College, the Massachusetts College of Art, Mount Holyoke College, the University of Massachusetts at Boston. From 1999 to 2011, he was a professor of art at University of Massachusetts at Amherst.

== Works ==
Richard Yarde worked in the most unforgiving medium - watercolor. He says that "The watercolor either succeeds or it doesn't, just like surgery." Since he works free handed, he has to take the risk that he may not succeed on the first round. Yarde often improvised, sometimes while listening to jazz. Several of his works were unusually large for a watercolorist, 10 by 10 feet or larger. His work defies the fact that watercolor paintings should be small, charming renderings of landscapes or flowers. Yarde's paintings are monumental in scale that express poignant personal themes, he expressed these themes using a medium that has traditionally been described as translucent and temporal. Yarde was also inspired by elements based on different cultures, which shapes his work into how he perceives the world. Yarde had a gallery showing based on this theme.

=== Selected works ===
- Ringshout is about a slave ceremony, in which worshipers are moving counterclockwise, stomping, clapping and chanting which results in healing and transformation. Yarde's paintings always work with grids, patterns, and self portraits.
- Coming and Going No 1 is a mural - a huge watercolor piece. In the text beside the painting, Yarde explains the place of jazz in his work, and why he uses the modernist grid.
- Mojo Hand, Yarde's largest work, is an X-ray of a female body floating on a dark blue background. Yarde mentioned that his hands surround the figure to show the power of human touch because of the healing powers it has.
- Portrait of educator Inman Page, collection of Brown University, 1979. Yarde created a watercolor study and oil portrait of Page for a festival honoring author Ralph Ellison, as Brown alumnus Page had been Ellison's mentor. The watercolor was presented to Ellison, and the oil was hung in Brown's John Hay Library.
- John William Ward - Portrait of Amherst College President that hangs in Johnson Chapel.
