= Elbert Weinberg =

American sculptor

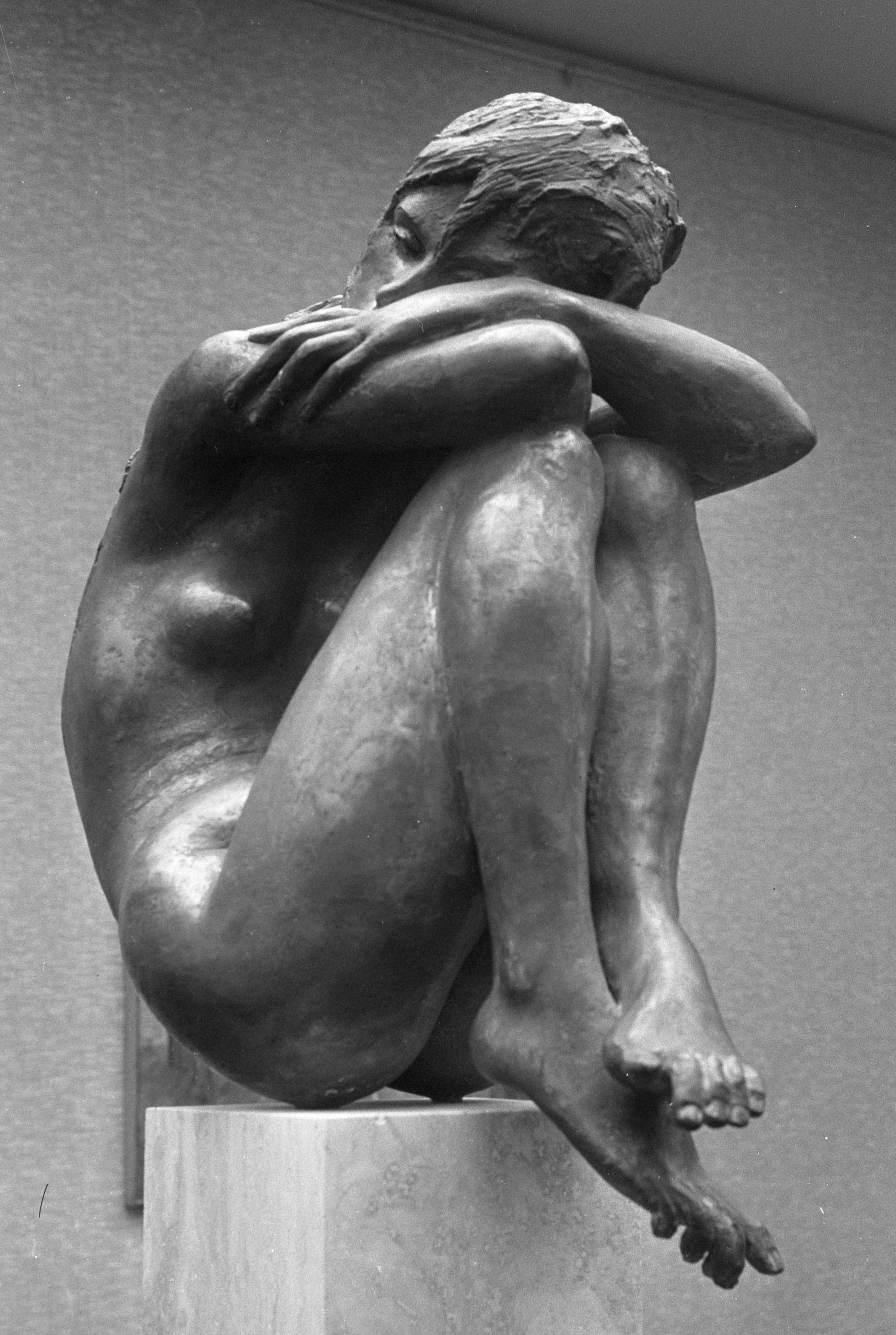
Sitting Eve by Weinberg, Amsterdam

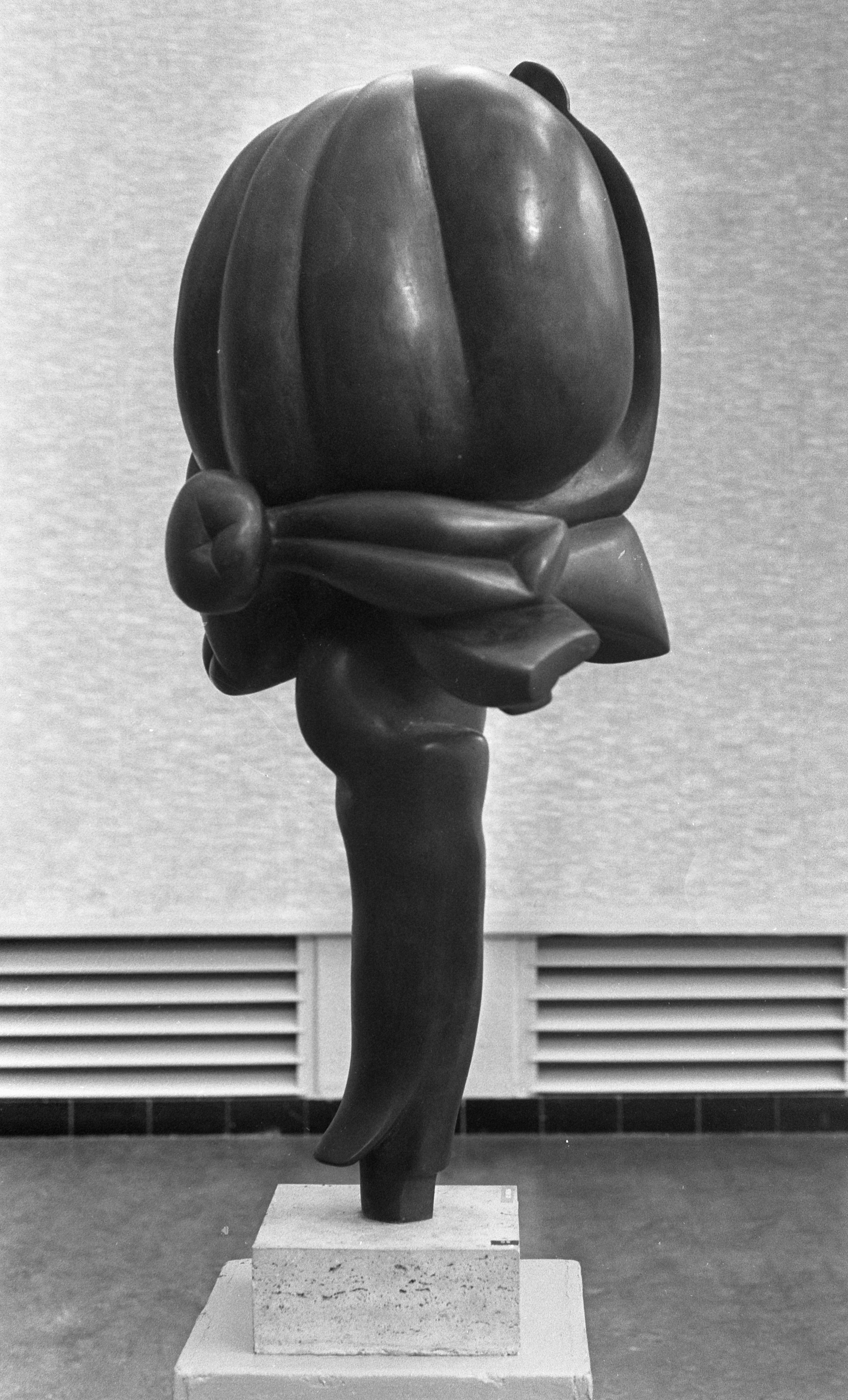
Floral Bride by Weinberg, Amsterdam

Elbert Weinberg (May 27, 1928 – December 27, 1991) was an American sculptor.

He was born in Hartford, Connecticut. Displaying an early interest in art, he enrolled at the Hartford Art School at night while attending Weaver High School. After two years he transferred to the Rhode Island School of Design. At the young age of 23, he was awarded the prestigious Prix de Rome, which allowed him to perform further art study in Italy. Upon returning to the U.S., he became a teacher at the Yale School of Design. There he produced a wood carving that caught the eye of a trustee from the Museum of Modern Art, and this sculpture was shown on the cover of Art in America.

In 1959, he was awarded a Guggenheim Fellowship and he decided to return to Rome, where he remained for the next eleven years. Returning to the U.S., he taught sculpting at Dartmouth College, Boston University, Temple University (while in Rome) and Union College. He became Professor of Sculpture at Boston University in 1983.

His early works were influenced by themes of mythology, religion and the Holocaust. They have been displayed at multiple museums, including the New York Museum of Modern Art, the Boston Museum of Fine Arts and the Wadsworth Atheneum in his home town of Hartford. Among his most acclaimed works are the Joie de Danse in the Portman San Francisco hotel and the 1980 Holocaust Memorial at Freedom Plaza in Wilmington, Delaware. His work Procession was displayed at the Jewish Museum of New York, Jacob Wrestling with the Angel was shown at Brandeis University, the Procession 2 at Beth El Temple in West Hartford, and Justice at the Boston University School of Law.

Despite being widely recognized as a talented sculptor, Elbert Weinberg never attained financial success during his lifetime, in part because he did not prefer the abstract form of sculpture that sold more readily during this period. He died of myelofibrosis and was survived by his daughter Julia and mother Rose Apter Weinberg. The Elbert Weinberg Prize was established in his memory out of a trust fund set up in his name.

== Awards ==
- Prix de Rome, 1951
- Award for Achievement in the Arts, Yale University, 1959
- Guggenheim Foundation Award, 1960
- American Academy of Arts and Letters Sculpture Award, 1968
- Elizabeth H. Watrous Gold Medal for Sculpture, 1989, National Academy of Design
- Lifetime Achievement in Sculpture, Alex Ettl Grant, 1991, National Sculpture Society
