= John Brook =

- John Brook, self-portrait
- Born: 1924; Woonsocket, Rhode Island, U.S.
- Died: July 29, 2016 (aged 92); Boston, Massachusetts, U.S.
- Education: Harvard University
- Known for: Photography

John Brook (1924-2016) was a Boston photographer who gained national recognition in the mid-20th century.

== Early life and education ==
He was born to English immigrant parents in Woonsocket, Rhode Island, in 1924. He taught himself photography as a child, and won first prize in a national competition at the age of 12. He attended Harvard University, graduating in 1947.

== Career ==
After college he opened a studio on Newbury Street in Boston. He rose to prominence as a portraitist in the 1950s, photographing celebrities such as composer Igor Stravinsky, jazz musicians Duke Ellington, Dave Brubeck, and Thelonious Monk, prima ballerina Maria Tallchief, and first lady Eleanor Roosevelt. On the strength of this work he became the staff photographer for the Boston Symphony Orchestra.

Brook's photographs were published widely in magazines such as Time, Vogue, Popular Photography, and ARTnews. In 1959 he was featured in the New Talent issue of Art in America. In 1966 he was one of 20 photographers whose work was featured in Life magazine's 30th Anniversary Photography Special Issue; others included Richard Avedon, Henri Cartier-Bresson, and Robert Doisneau. He exhibited at venues around the world, including the biennial photography festival in Milan, where he won a gold medal in 1960; a solo exhibition at the George Eastman Museum in 1961; the 1964/1965 New York World's Fair; Expo 67 in Montreal; and the 1970 World's Fair in Osaka.

Boston artist Steven Trefonides cited Brook as a formative influence.

== Later life and legacy ==
An accident in the 1990s left him disabled, forcing him to give up photography. He died on July 29, 2016, in a Boston-area nursing home.

The Boston Public Library owns a large number of his prints. His work is also included in the permanent collections of the Metropolitan Museum of Art, the Art Institute of Chicago, the Museum of Modern Art, the Boston Museum of Fine Arts, the Danforth Museum, and many other museums and private collectors.

His photographs can also be found in two published volumes: A Long the River Run (Scrimshaw Press, 1970) and Hold Me (Aura Publications, 1977).
