= Maud Morgan =

American artist

Maud (Cabot) Morgan
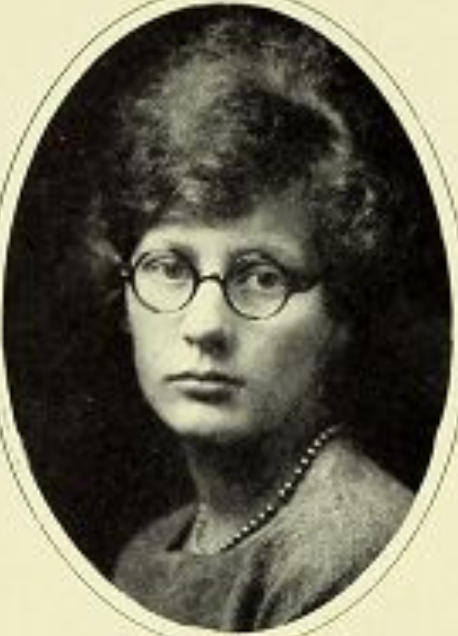
- Maud Cabot, from the 1925 yearbook of Barnard College
- Born: March 1, 1903; New York City, New York, USA
- Died: March 14, 1999 (aged 96); Cambridge, Massachusetts, USA
- Known for: Painting
- Spouse: Patrick Morgan (m. 1931; div. 1970)

Maud (Cabot) Morgan (March 1, 1903 – March 14, 1999) was an American modern artist and teacher who is best known for her abstract expressionism. She mentored Frank Stella and Carl Andre, and had art pieces shown alongside such notable contemporaries as Jackson Pollock and Mark Rothko. Morgan's life began in New York City to an aristocratic family. She was also known as Boston's Modernist Doyenne.

She died from complications resulting from pneumonia in 1999.

== Education and early life ==
Maud Cabot grew up in New York City, where she graduated from The Ethel Walker School in 1921 . She then attended Barnard College. Upon graduating, she moved to Paris to study at The Sorbonne. She travelled throughout the world and met such notable people as Mahatma Gandhi, and travelled Europe with the likes of James Joyce and Ernest Hemingway. She later travelled to Russia to witness and experience communism, and came back to Paris, where she met her husband, Patrick Morgan, an American contemporary artist, whose influence encouraged her to paint. Her marriage to Pat Morgan took place in a lawyer's office on a snowy day in New York in 1931. She wasn't very interested in getting married, and thus wanted to minimize the importance of the occasion. Together they moved back to New York City. She absolutely loved living in New York and she could see herself building and continuing her life there.

== Career ==
In 1938, Morgan showed her first exhibit, at the Metropolitan Museum of Art, as well as the Whitney Gallery purchased some of her works. Just as her career was blooming, she decided to move with her husband to Andover, Massachusetts, where he had acquired a teaching position. As a woman artist working in a Boston suburb, away from the New York spotlight, Morgan's chances for serious recognition became severely reduced.

In a 1996 interview in the Boston Globe, Morgan confirmed that she believed her move to Andover sorely undermined the possibility of becoming recognized: "I was in just the right hot spot. I think I could have made it into--I'm not saying the top echelon--but I could have made . . . a certain kind of fame."

It has been speculated that another factor in Morgan's lack of fame was that her work was not identifiably feminine. In contrast to other noteworthy female artists, Morgan's work, as critic Mary Sherman stated, did not conform to "our notions of female art."

While she lived in Andover, she taught art at Abbot Academy and continued to expand and experiment her media in art. She exhibited at the Margaret Brown Gallery in Boston. In the late 1950s, her works were exhibited regularly at the Barbara Singer Gallery, and she was given one-person shows at the Massachusetts College of Art in Boston, the Fuller Art Museum in Brockton, the Addison Gallery in Andover, and the Museum of Fine Arts in Boston. She also exhibited at The Boston Public Library.

In 1980, a film titled Light Coming Through, directed by Nancy Venable Raine and Rickie Leacock, the head of the MIT film department, was released. The film focused on Morgan's career and works in painting.

In 1995, at the age of 92, Maud published her autobiography, "Morgan's Journey: A Life from Art". She died in 1999 and was buried at Mount Auburn Cemetery.

== Notable honors and awards ==
In 1987, Morgan earned an award from the Women's Caucus for Art.

To celebrate Morgan's 90th birthday in 1990, her friends donated funds to the Boston Museum of Fine Arts that established an annual award in her name to a woman artist from Massachusetts.

== Collections ==
Morgan's works are in several public collections, including:

- Museum of Modern Art, New York City
- Whitney Museum of Art, New York City
- Metropolitan Museum of Art, New York City
- Boston Museum of Fine Arts

== See also ==
- Boston Expressionism
