= Karl Zerbe =

American painter and educator (1903–1972)

- Born: September 16, 1903; Berlin, German Empire
- Died: November 24, 1972 (aged 69); Tallahassee, Florida, United States
- Education: Technische Hochschule Friedberg, Debschitz School
- Employer(s): School of the Museum of Fine Arts, Florida State University
- Known for: painting
- Movement: Expressionism
- Spouse: Marion Zerbe

Karl Zerbe (September 16, 1903 – November 24, 1972) was a German-born American painter and educator.

== Biography ==
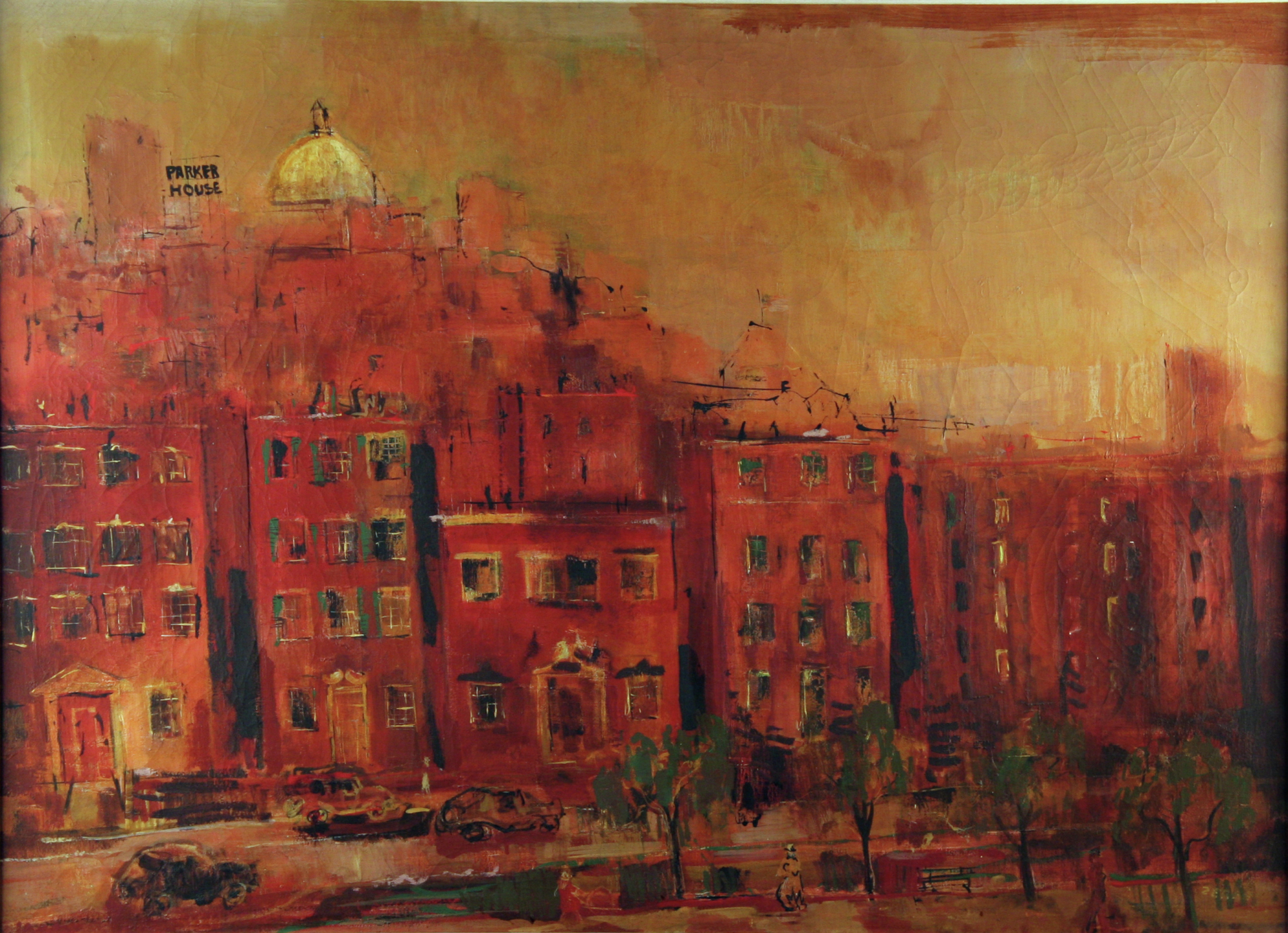
Zerbe's painting Beacon Hill, held by the Detroit Institute of Arts

Zerbe was born on September 16, 1903, in Berlin, Germany. The family lived in Paris, France, from 1904 to 1914, where his father was an executive in an electrical supply concern. In 1914 they moved to Frankfurt, Germany where they lived until 1920. Zerbe studied chemistry in 1920 at the Technische Hochschule in Friedberg, Germany.

From 1921 until 1923 he lived in Munich, where he studied painting at the Debschitz School, mainly under Josef Eberz. From 1924 until 1926 Zerbe worked and traveled in Italy on a fellowship from the City of Munich. In 1932 his oil painting titled, ‘’Herbstgarten’’ (autumnal garden), of 1929, was acquired by the National-Galerie, Berlin; in 1937, the painting was destroyed by the Nazis as "Degenerate art."

From 1937 until 1955, Zerbe was the head of the Department of Painting, School of the Museum of Fine Arts, Boston.

In 1939 Zerbe became a U.S. citizen and the same year for the first time he used encaustic. He joined the faculty in the Department of Art and Art History at Florida State University in 1955, where he taught until his death.

He was grouped together with the Boston artists Kahlil Gibran (sculptor), Jack Levine and Hyman Bloom as a key member of the Boston Expressionist school of painting, and through his teaching influenced a generation of painters, including, among others, David Aronson, Bernard Chaet, Reed Kay, Arthur Polonsky, Jack Kramer, Barbara Swan, Andrew Kooistra, and Lois Tarlow.

His works are thought significant because they record "the response of a distinguished artist of basically European sensibility to the physical and cultural scene of the New World".

== Solo exhibitions ==
- 1922: Gurlitt Gallery, Berlin, Germany
- 1926: Georg Caspari Gallery, Munich, Germany; Kunsthalle, Bremen, Germany; Osthaus Museum, Hagen, Germany
- 1934: Germanic Museum (now Busch-Reisinger Museum), Harvard University, Cambridge, Massachusetts
- 1934, 1935, 1936, 1937: Marie Sterner Galleries, New York City
- 1936, 1938, 1939, 1940: Grace Horne Galleries, Boston, Massachusetts
- 1941: Vose Galleries, Boston; Buchholz Gallery, New York City
- 1943: Mount Holyoke College, South Hadley, Massachusetts
- 1943, 1946, 1948, 1951, 1952: The Downtown Gallery, New York City
- 1943, 1947: Berkshire Museum, Pittsfield, Massachusetts
- 1945, 1946: Art Institute of Chicago, Illinois
- 1946: Detroit Institute of Arts, Detroit, Michigan
- 1948, 1949: Philadelphia Art Alliance, Pennsylvania
- 1948, 1955: Boris Mirski Gallery, Boston, Massachusetts
- 1950: Munson-Williams-Proctor Arts Institute, Utica, New York
- 1951-1952: Retrospective Exhibition circulated by the Institute of Contemporary Art, Boston, traveled to: Baltimore Museum of Art; Colorado Springs Fine Arts Center; Currier Gallery of Art, Manchester, New Hampshire; Florida Gulf Coast Art Center, Clearwater; M. H. de Young Memorial Museum, San Francisco; Massachusetts Institute of Technology, Cambridge, Massachusetts;
- 1954: The Allan Gallery, New York City
- 1958: Florida State University, Tallahassee; Ringling Brothers Museum of Art, Sarasota, Florida
- 1958, 1959, 1960: Nordness Gallery, New York City
- 1960: New Arts Gallery, Atlanta, Georgia
- 1961-1962: Retrospective Exhibition circulated by The American Federation of Arts, Boston University

== Work in public collections ==
Zerbe's work is in various public collections, including:

- Addison Gallery of American Art, Andover, Massachusetts, United States
- Albright Knox Art Gallery, Buffalo, New York, United States
- Art Institute of Chicago, Chicago, Illinois, United States
- New Britain Museum of American Art, Connecticut, United States
- Auburn University, Auburn, Alabama, United States
- Baltimore Museum of Art, Baltimore, Maryland, United States
- Birmingham Museum of Art, Birmingham, Alabama, United States
- Brooklyn Museum, New York City, New York, United States
- Butler Institute of American Art, Youngstown, Ohio, United States
- Saint Louis Art Museum, St. Louis, Missouri, United States
- Colby College Museum of Art, Waterville, Maine, United States
- Cranbrook Academy of Art, Bloomfield Hills, Michigan, United States
- Currier Museum of Art, Manchester, New Hampshire, United States
- Detroit Institute of Arts, Detroit, Michigan, United States
- Düren Leopold Hoesch Museum
- Fogg Art Museum and the Busch Reisinger Museum at Harvard University, Cambridge, Massachusetts, United States
- Amon Carter Museum, Fort Worth, Texas, United States
- Kestner Museum, Hanover, Germany
- LeMoyne Center for the Visual Arts, Tallahassee, Florida
- Los Angeles County Museum of Art (LACMA), Los Angeles, California, United States
- Massachusetts Institute of Technology, Cambridge, Massachusetts, United States
- Metropolitan Museum of Art, New York City, New York, United States
- Mildred Lane Kemper Art Museum at Washington University in St. Louis, St. Louis, Missouri, United States
- Mobile Museum of Art, Mobile, Alabama, United States
- Munson-Williams-Proctor Arts Institute, Utica, New York, United States
- Museum of Fine Arts, Boston, Boston, Massachusetts, United States
- Museum of Modern Art, New York, United States
- National Gallery of Art, Washington, United States
- National Institute of Arts and Letters, New York City, New York, United States
- Newark Museum
- Philadelphia Museum of Art
- Rhode Island School of Design Museum, Providence, Rhode Island, United States
- Sarah Lawrence College, Westchester County, New York, United States
- Smith College Museum of Art, Northampton, Massachusetts, United States
- Staatliche Graphische Sammlung, Munich, Germany
- Staedelsches Kunstinstitut, Frankfurt, Germany
- Tel Aviv Museum of Art, Tel Aviv, Israel
- Georgia Museum of Art, Athens, Georgia, United States
- Fred Jones Jr. Museum of Art, Oklahoma City, Oklahoma, United States
- Walker Art Center, Minneapolis, Minnesota, United States
- Whitney Museum of American Art, New York City, New York, United States
- Wichita Art Museum, Wichita, Kansas, United States

== See also ==
- Art movement
- Art periods
- Expressionism
