= Jack Levine =

American Social Realist painter and printmaker

- Finger of Newt 1993-1998
- Born: January 3, 1915; Boston, Massachusetts, U.S.
- Died: November 8, 2010 (aged 95); New York, New York, U.S.
- Education: Harvard University
- Known for: Painting, Printmaking
- Movement: Social RealismBoston Expressionism
- Spouse: Ruth Gikow (1946-1982; her death)
- Children: 1
- Awards: Fulbright grant, 1951

Jack Levine (January 3, 1915 – November 8, 2010) was an American Social Realist painter and printmaker best known for his satires on modern life, political corruption, and biblical narratives. Levine is considered one of the key artists of the Boston Expressionist movement.

== Early life and education ==
Jack Levine was the eighth child born to Samuel and Mary Levine, Lithuanian Jewish immigrants. He grew up in the South End of Boston, where he observed a street life composed of European immigrants and a prevalence of poverty and societal ills, subjects which would inform his work. His mother encouraged him to draw and stored his art materials in the family kitchen. On visits to his father's shoe store, he was given brown wrapping paper on which he would draw. Subjects of his childhood drawings included mature subjects such as National Guardsmen patrolling the streets in military attire during the Boston Police strike of 1919.

Levine's first formal artistic education was studying with artist and art educator Harold K. Zimmerman at the Jewish Welfare Center in Roxbury from 1924 to 1931. Another one of Zimmerman's young art students was Hyman Bloom. From 1929 to 1933, Levine and Bloom studied with Denman Ross at Harvard University. As an adolescent, Levine was already, by his own account, "a formidable draftsman". Ross sponsored Bloom and Levine's studies via a weekly stipend, as well as studio space.

== Career ==
In 1932, Ross included Levine's drawings in an exhibition at the Fogg Art Museum at Harvard, and three years later bequeathed twenty drawings by Levine to the museum's collection. Levine's early work was most influenced by Bloom, Chaïm Soutine, Georges Rouault, and Oskar Kokoschka. Along with Bloom and Karl Zerbe, he became associated with the style known as Boston Expressionism.

From 1935 to 1940, he was employed by the Works Progress Administration. In 1936, Levine had his first exhibition of paintings in New York City in New Horizons in American Art at the Museum of Modern Art. The paintings selected for the exhibition were Card Game and Brain Trust, the latter was painted from his observation of life in the Boston Common. In 1937, his The Feast of Pure Reason, a satire of Boston political power, was placed on loan to the Museum of Modern Art. In the same year String Quartet was shown at the Whitney Museum of American Art, and purchased in 1942 by the Metropolitan Museum of Art. The death of his father in 1939 prompted a series of paintings of Jewish sages.

From 1942-45, Levine served in the United States Army during World War II. Upon his discharge from service he painted Welcome Home (1946), a lampoon of the arrogance of military power. In 1959, the painting would engender political controversy when it was included in the American National Exhibition in Moscow, raising suspicions in the House Un-American Activities Committee of pro-Communist sympathies. President Dwight D. Eisenhower called the painting "more lampoon than art."

Levine was awarded a John Simon Guggenheim Fellowship in 1945. With a Fulbright grant he traveled to Europe in 1951, and was affected by the work of the Old Masters, particularly the Mannerism of El Greco, which inspired him to distort and exaggerate the forms of his figures for expressive purposes.

After returning to the United States, Levine continued to paint biblical subjects, and also produced Gangster Funeral, a narrative which Levine referred to as a "comedy". Further commentary on American life was furnished by Election Night (1954), Inauguration (1958), and Thirty- Five Minutes from Times Square (1956). Also in the late 1950s, Levine painted a series of sensitive portraits of his wife and daughter. In the 1960s, he responded not only to social unrest in the United States with works such as Birmingham '63 (1963), but to international subjects as well, as in The Spanish Prison (1959–1962), Panethnikon (1978), and The Arms Brokers (1982–83). Levine once said of himself, "I am primarily concerned with the condition of man." Following his own direction, he created a distinct body of socially conscious art that probes the strengths and weaknesses of humanity.

In 1979 Levine was elected into the National Academy of Design as an Associate member and became a full Academician in 1982. Following the death of his wife in 1982, he developed an increased interest in Hebraism, and with it a proliferation of paintings with themes from the Hebrew Bible.

== Exhibitions and collections ==
Levine's work is featured in many public collections, including the Art Institute of Chicago, the Museum of Modern Art (MoMA), the Metropolitan Museum of Art, the National Museum of American Art, the Hirshhorn Museum and Sculpture Garden, the Brooklyn Museum, the Phillips Collection, the Whitney Museum of American Art, the Fogg Art Museum, and the National Gallery of Art. In 1973 the Vatican purchased Cain and Abel (1961), to the satisfaction of Pope Paul VI.

In 1978, a retrospective of Levine's work was held at the Jewish Museum (New York). He was the subject of a 1989 film documentary entitled Feast of Pure Reason.

In 2005, at the age of 90, Levine was given a mini-retrospective exhibition at DC Moore Gallery in New York City.

== Personal life and death ==
In 1946, he married the painter Ruth Gikow and moved to New York City. They had one daughter, Susanna who also became an artist.

Levine died at his home in Manhattan, New York on November 8, 2010, at the age of 95.
