= Hyman Bloom =

Latvian-American painter

- Born: Hyman Melamed; March 29, 1913; Brunava, Kovno Governorate, Russian Empire, after 1921 Latvia
- Died: August 26, 2009 (aged 96); Nashua, NH, United States
- Known for: Painting
- Spouses: Nina Bohlen (1954-1961); Stella Caralis (1978-2009)

Hyman Bloom (March 29, 1913 – August 26, 2009) was an American painter born in the Russian Empire, in territory that is now Latvia. His work was influenced by his Jewish heritage and Eastern religions as well as by artists including Altdorfer, Grünewald, Caravaggio, Rembrandt, Blake, Bresdin, Ensor and Soutine. He first came to prominence when his work was included in the 1942 Museum of Modern Art exhibition "Americans 1942 -- 18 Artists from 9 States". MoMA purchased 2 paintings from the exhibition and Time magazine singled him out as a "striking discovery" in their exhibition review.

His work was selected for both the 1948 and 1950 Venice Biennale exhibitions and his 1954 retrospective traveled from Boston's Institute of Contemporary Art to the Albright Gallery and the de Young Museum before closing out at The Whitney Museum of American Art in 1955. In a 1954 interview with Yale art professor Bernard Chaet, Willem de Kooning indicated that he and Jackson Pollock both considered Bloom to be “America’s first abstract expressionist”, a label that Bloom would disavow. Starting in the mid 1950s his work began to shift more towards works on paper and he exclusively focused on drawing throughout the 1960s, returning to painting in 1971. He continued both drawing and painting until his death in 2009 at the age of 96.

== Early life and education ==
Two Wrestlers by Hyman Bloom, 1929

Hyman Bloom (né Melamed) was born into an Orthodox Jewish family in the tiny Jewish village of Brunavišķi, in the Kovno Governorate, then part of the Russian Empire. The area formed part of Lithuania from 1918 until it was transferred to Latvia in the 1921 Latvian–Lithuanian border settlement. (Note: Brunavišķi is in the Bauska district of the Zemgale region of southern Latvia, near the town of Bauska and about 45 miles south of Riga near the Lithuanian border.) Brunavišķi was a poor village in an area torn by civil unrest, where Jews lived in fear of persecution. He was one of six children born to Joseph and Anna Melamed. His father was a leather worker. Hyman, along with his parents and older brother, Bernard, emigrated to the United States in 1920, joining his two eldest brothers, Samuel and Morris, in Boston. By that time the two brothers had changed their family name to Bloom and started their own leather business. The extended family lived in a three-room tenement apartment in Boston's West End.

At a young age Bloom planned to become a rabbi, but his family could not find a suitable teacher. In the eighth grade he received a scholarship to a program for gifted high school students at the Museum of Fine Arts. He attended the Boston High School of Commerce, which was near the museum. He also took art classes at the West End Community Center, a settlement house. The classes were taught by Harold Zimmerman, a student at the School of the Museum of Fine Arts, who also taught the young Jack Levine at another settlement house in Roxbury. When Bloom was fifteen, he and Levine began studying with a well-known Harvard art professor, Denman Ross, who rented a studio for the purpose and paid the boys a weekly stipend to enable them to continue their studies rather than take jobs to support their families. Ross sponsored Bloom from 1928 to 1933. He also sponsored Harold Zimmerman. (Note: According to Judith Bookbinder (p. 295), Zimmerman eked out a meager living as an art teacher until his death at the age of 41.)

Bloom's foundational training under Zimmerman was rigorous and unconventional, centered on an experimental pedagogy of visual memory and imagination rather than drawing from casts or live models. Under Zimmerman's instruction, Bloom analyzed Old Master compositions and anatomical plates to commit their structural principles to memory, subsequently reconstructing them entirely from recall on his own sheet; Bloom later noted that "when I needed to draw muscles I studied Michelangelo and when I wanted to draw hair I looked at Botticelli." Denman Ross summarized Zimmerman's philosophy by observing that artists are moved "not so much by what we see as by what we imagine as visible."

While Zimmerman guided his draftsmanship, Ross instructed Bloom in painting techniques and formal design theory. Ross, whose leanings were more academic, taught Bloom how to handle paint and build tone in the tradition of earlier masters. Zimmerman also hung William Blake prints on the walls of the settlement house, encouraged students to synthesize images from multiple sources, and took Bloom and Levine on a field trip to the Museum of Modern Art in New York, where Bloom was deeply impressed by the work of Georges Rouault and Chaim Soutine and began experimenting with expressive paint handling. Together, Zimmerman's imaginative discipline and Ross's formal design principles fostered an approach that viewed art not as passive reproduction, but as the emotional synthesis of memory and form.

== Career ==
=== Early work ===
In the 1930s Bloom worked sporadically for the Public Works of Art Project and the Federal Art Project, and for his brothers. He was a slow, methodical painter who liked to work on a piece, then set it aside for a while and come back to it with a fresh perspective. As a result, he had trouble meeting government deadlines. He shared a studio in the South End with Levine and another artist, Betty Chase. It was during this period that he developed a lifelong interest in Eastern philosophy and music, and in Theosophy.

He first received national attention in 1942 when thirteen of his paintings were included in the Museum of Modern Art (MoMA) exhibition Americans 1942: 18 Artists from 9 States, curated by Dorothy Miller. (Note: The 13 paintings were: Skeleton (c. 1936), The Fish (c. 1936), Circus Rider (c. 1937), The Baby (c. 1938), The Stove (1938), The Christmas Tree (c. 1939), The Christmas Tree (1939), The Christmas Tree (1939), The Chandelier (c. 1940), The Synagogue (c. 1940), The Synagogue (c. 1940), Jew with the Torah (c. 1940), The Bride (1941).) MoMA purchased two of his paintings from that exhibition, and he was featured in Time magazine. The titles of his paintings in the exhibition reflect some of his recurring themes. Two were titled The Synagogue, another, Jew with the Torah; Bloom was actually criticized by one reviewer for including "stereotypical" Jewish images. He also had two paintings titled The Christmas Tree, and another titled The Chandelier, both subjects he returned to repeatedly. Another, Skeleton (c. 1936), was followed by a series of cadaver paintings in the forties, and The Fish (c. 1936) was one of many paintings and drawings of fish he created over the course of his career.

Bloom was associated at first with the growing Abstract Expressionist movement. Willem de Kooning and Jackson Pollock, who first saw Bloom's work at the MoMA exhibition, considered Bloom "the first Abstract Expressionist artist in America." In 1950 he was chosen, along with the likes of de Kooning, Pollock, and Arshile Gorky, to represent the United States at the Venice Biennale. That same year Elaine de Kooning wrote about Bloom in ARTnews, noting that in paintings such as The Harpies, his work approached total abstraction: "the whole impact is carried in the boiling action of the pigment". In 1951 Thomas B. Hess reproduced Bloom's Archaeological Treasure in his first book, Abstract Painting: Background and American Phase, along with works by Picasso, Pollock, and others. Both de Kooning and Hess remarked on Bloom's expressive paint handling, a key characteristic of Abstract Expressionist painting.

As abstract expressionism dominated the American art world, Bloom became disenchanted with it, calling it "emotional catharsis, with no intellectual basis." In addition, instead of moving to New York to pursue his career, he opted to stay in Boston. As a result he fell out of favor with critics and never achieved the kind of fame that Pollock and others did. He disliked self-promotion and never placed much value on critical acclaim.

=== Cadaver images ===
Slaughtered Animal (1953), oil on canvas, 70 x 40in.

Bloom's cadaver images are among his most compelling and controversial. The series began in 1943 when artist David Aronson invited Bloom to accompany him on a trip to a morgue, where he was working on sketches for a painting, Resurrection. Bloom was both repelled by and drawn to the sight of the decomposing bodies, and painted them, he explained later, in hopes of coming to terms with death. In the first group of paintings, which include Corpse of an Elderly Male (1944), Female Corpse, Front View (1945) and Female Corpse, Back View (1947), the supine bodies are displayed vertically, as if viewed from above. The upright posture is reminiscent of Grünewald's crucified Christ in the Isenheim Altarpiece, Bloom's favorite painting. As critic Judith Bookbinder points out, the corpse "rises up" to confront the viewer. Bloom believed that death was a metamorphosis from one form of life to another as the body was consumed by living organisms: a process for which resurrection can be seen as a metaphor.

The paintings were first exhibited in Boston's Stuart Gallery in 1945, to mixed reviews. At the Durlacher Gallery in New York, they were displayed in a back room, available for viewing upon request. Some critics complained that the work was "morbid" and "gruesome" while others were appreciative. Joseph Gibbs wrote, "After a moment of repugnance, one becomes aware that within the artist's seeming absorption in death and decay is contained the resurrection—the relative unimportance of fugitive flesh as opposed to the indestructibility of the spirit." Robert Taylor called him "a painter of extraordinary courage."

In the late forties and early fifties, Bloom produced a second, very different, series of cadaver images. Paintings such as The Hull (1952), The Anatomist (1953), and Slaughtered Animal (1953) depict dissected corpses and amputated limbs. Some critics have suggested that these images arose from Bloom's exposure to pogroms in his home country, and later, reports of the Holocaust. According to Bloom, his concern "was the complexity and color beauty of the internal works, the curiosity, the wonder, and the feeling of transgressing boundaries, which such curiosity evokes." Whatever else may have motivated him, Bloom had an artist's appreciation for color and surface texture, and admired works by artists such as Soutine (Carcass of Beef, 1924) and Rembrandt (Anatomy Lesson of Dr. Nicolaes Tulp, 1632; The Slaughtered Ox, 1655) that explored similar themes. He called the colors of a decaying corpse he had seen in a morgue "harrowing" and yet "beautiful...iridescent and pearly."

=== Spiritual themes ===
Many of Bloom's paintings feature rabbis, usually holding the Torah. According to Bloom, his intentions were more artistic than religious. He began questioning his Jewish faith early in life, and painted rabbis, he claimed, because that was what he knew. Over the course of his career he produced dozens of paintings of rabbis, some of whom bore no small resemblance to himself. When asked if they were self-portraits, he replied cryptically, "When did I ever paint anything else?"

He took an interest in Eastern mysticism and music long before the 1960s, when they became associated with youth culture in the West. He taught himself how to play the sitar, oud, and other instruments, and in 1960 helped James Rubin found the Pan Orient Arts Foundation, a group that organized concerts and collected recordings by Indian artists.

In the 1950s he took LSD under the supervision of doctors who were studying its effects on creativity. While tripping, he produced surreal sketches and unintelligible scribbles, on one page writing the words "Hindu religion".

Much of his work of the 1950s and '60s reflects his preoccupation with theosophy and the spirit world. Paintings such as The Medium (1951) and his Séance series of the mid-50s depict mediums channeling spirits. He considered the artist a kind of channel, one whose reward was "ecstasy from contact with the unknown". For most of the 1960s he concentrated on drawing rather than painting in order to focus his attention on composition and value. On the Astral Plane (1966) is a series of grimly surreal charcoal drawings, inspired by the work of Altdorfer and Bresdin, in which lone figures who have entered the astral plane through death or meditation are surrounded by monsters. Asked why he chose to depict only the first level, filled with frightening creatures, Bloom replied, "You draw your experience."

=== Later work ===
Bloom continued painting into his nineties. His oil paintings of the Lubec, Maine, woods in the late 1970s exude what critic Holland Cotter called a "disturbed, ecstatic energy". The same could be said of his seascapes, such as Seascape I (1974). He painted vibrant still lifes featuring colorful gourds and iridescent Art Nouveau pottery. He produced at least twenty paintings of rabbis between the mid-80s and 2008. Meanwhile he continued exhibiting, mostly in the Boston area. The Fuller Museum presented a full retrospective of his work in 1996. Another was organized by the National Academy of Design in New York in 2002.

=== Catalogue Raisonné Project ===
A Bloom catalogue raisonné project has been started. Details regarding the project can be found on the Hyman Bloom educational website. If you own a Bloom work, or have information on the listed "missing" Bloom works, please contact the project administrator to provide your information.

== Personal life ==
Bloom was a close friend of the composer Alan Hovhaness and the Greek mystic painter Hermon di Giovanno. The three of them often met to discuss various mystical subjects and to listen to Indian classical music. Bloom encouraged di Giovanno in his art, providing him with a set of pastels with which he executed his earliest paintings.

He was married to Nina Bohlen from 1954 to 1961, and to Stella Caralis from 1978 until his death. His last residence was in Nashua, New Hampshire. He died there on August 26, 2009, at the age of 96. He was survived by his wife Stella.

== Legacy ==
Bloom influenced many artists in the Boston area and elsewhere, and although he was largely indifferent to trends and movements, he is considered a key figure in the Boston Expressionist school. Because he worked slowly, often taking years to complete a painting, he left a relatively small body of work. He said a piece was finished "when the mood is as intense as it can be made."

His work is included in the collections of the Museum of Modern Art, the Boston Museum of Fine Arts, the Art Institute of Chicago, the Whitney Museum of American Art, the Smithsonian's Hirshhorn Museum, the National Academy of Design, and many others. Hyman Bloom: The Beauty of All Things, a film about the artist's life and work, was released in October 2009.

In 2019, the Boston Museum of Fine Arts held a major Bloom exhibition and committed to becoming the museum of record for Hyman Bloom. This goal was furthered in 2024 when Bloom’s widow donated all 127 of Bloom’s intact sketchbooks to the Boston MFA along with a number of paintings and drawings. The museum featured a number of these gifts in their 2024 Bloom exhibition “Hyman Bloom: Landscapes of the Mind”.

== Public collections ==
Bloom's work is represented in more than forty public and academic collections across the United States. The largest institutional repositories of his paintings and drawings are held by the Museum of Fine Arts, Boston and the Harvard Art Museums in Cambridge, Massachusetts.

=== Massachusetts ===
- Addison Gallery of American Art, Phillips Academy, Andover
- Danforth Art Museum, Framingham State University
- Davis Museum at Wellesley College, Wellesley (including Rocks and Autumn Leaves, 1949)
- deCordova Sculpture Park and Museum, Lincoln (including The Harpies, 1947)
- Harvard Art Museums (Fogg Museum), Cambridge (major repository of drawings, including early sketchbooks and studies from the Denman Waldo Ross collection)
- Mead Art Museum, Amherst College
- Mount Holyoke College Art Museum, South Hadley (including Still Life with Brown Floor, 1983)
- Museum of Fine Arts, Boston (largest institutional holding, including Christmas Tree, 1939; Chandelier II, 1945; Slaughtered Animal, 1953; Fish, 1953; Female Cadaver, 1954; and Landscape #2 and Landscape #3, 1962)
- Rose Art Museum, Brandeis University, Waltham
- Smith College Museum of Art, Northampton
- University Museum of Contemporary Art, University of Massachusetts Amherst
- Worcester Art Museum, Worcester (including The Hull, 1952)

=== Rest of New England ===
- Bates College Museum of Art, Lewiston, Maine (including Island Cave, 1956)
- Bowdoin College Museum of Art, Brunswick, Maine
- Currier Museum of Art, Manchester, New Hampshire (including Cadaver on a Table, 1953)
- Hood Museum of Art, Dartmouth College, Hanover, New Hampshire (including Seascape I, 1956)
- Portland Museum of Art, Portland, Maine
- William Benton Museum of Art, University of Connecticut, Storrs

=== New York and Mid-Atlantic ===
- Herbert F. Johnson Museum of Art, Cornell University, Ithaca, New York (including On The Astral Plane: Up To Their Necks, 1966)
- Hirshhorn Museum and Sculpture Garden, Washington, D.C. (including Apparition of Danger, 1951; The Medium, 1951; and Rabbi With Torah, 1955)
- The Jewish Museum, New York City
- Morgan Library & Museum, New York City (including Law Of The Fishes, 1956, and Landscape #1, 1962)
- Museum of Modern Art, New York City (including The Synagogue, 1940, and The Bride, 1941)
- Mütter Museum, College of Physicians of Philadelphia, Pennsylvania (including A Leg (Severed Leg), 1945)
- National Academy of Design, New York City (including Chandelier I, 1944, and Landscape #4, 1963)
- Neuberger Museum of Art, Purchase, New York
- Princeton University Art Museum, Princeton, New Jersey
- Smithsonian American Art Museum, Washington, D.C. (including The Beggar, 1956)
- Whitney Museum of American Art, New York City (including Autopsy, 1953, and The Anatomist, 1953)
- Yeshiva University Museum, New York City (including On The Astral Plane: In A Cave, 1965)
- Zimmerli Art Museum, Rutgers University, New Brunswick, New Jersey

=== Midwest, West, and South ===
- Arkansas Museum of Fine Arts, Little Rock, Arkansas
- Art Institute of Chicago, Illinois
- Grunwald Center for the Graphic Arts, UCLA, Los Angeles, California
- Cantor Arts Center, Stanford University, California
- Krannert Art Museum, University of Illinois Urbana-Champaign
- Los Angeles County Museum of Art, California (including Rabbi With Torah, 1955)
- Magnes Collection of Jewish Art and Life, University of California, Berkeley
- Minneapolis Institute of Art, Minnesota
- Minnesota Museum of American Art, Saint Paul, Minnesota
- Skirball Museum, Los Angeles, California (including The Eye (of the Universe), 1947, and Rabbi With Torah, 1955)
- Smart Museum of Art, University of Chicago, Illinois
- Weisman Art Museum, University of Minnesota, Minneapolis

=== Archival collections ===
Primary source materials, correspondence, dealer records, and oral histories concerning Bloom are preserved across multiple collections at the Archives of American Art, Smithsonian Institution:

- Personal papers and oral histories:
  - Hyman Bloom Papers, 1936–1980 (correspondence, biographical materials, and sketches)
  - Oral history interview with Hyman Bloom, by Dorothy Abbott Thompson, 1986
  - Oral history interview with Dorothy C. Miller, 1970–1971 (addressing Bloom's inclusion in MoMA's 1942 Americans 1942 exhibition)
- Dealer and gallery records:
  - Boris Mirski Gallery Records, 1936–2000; and Boris Mirski oral history interview by Robert F. Brown, 1973
  - Downtown Gallery Records, 1824–1974 (bulk 1926–1969)
  - Terry Dintenfass, Inc. Records, 1947–1987; and Terry Dintenfass oral history interview by Paul Cummings, 1974–1975
  - Swetzoff Gallery Records, 1941–1968
  - Kirk Askew Papers, 1928–1967 (Durlacher Bros.)
- Teachers and associates:
  - Harold K. Zimmerman Papers, 1930–1954
  - Carl E. and Rosamond Forbes Pickhardt Papers concerning Harold K. Zimmerman, ca. 1932–1943
  - Jack Levine Papers, 1923–1999
  - Oral history interview with Ernst Halberstadt, 1979

== Honors and awards ==
- Critic's Choice Award from the Cincinnati Museum of Art for Christmas Tree, 1945
- Guggenheim fellowship, 1949
- Academy Award in Art from the American Academy of Arts and Letters, 1953
- Ford Foundation fellowship, 1959
- Elected to the American Academy of Arts and Letters, 1974
- Elected to the National Academy of Design, 1984
- Thomas R. Proctor Prize for Jew with Torah from the National Academy of Design, 1999
