= Danforth Art =

Art museum and school at Framingham State University

The Danforth at Framingham State University
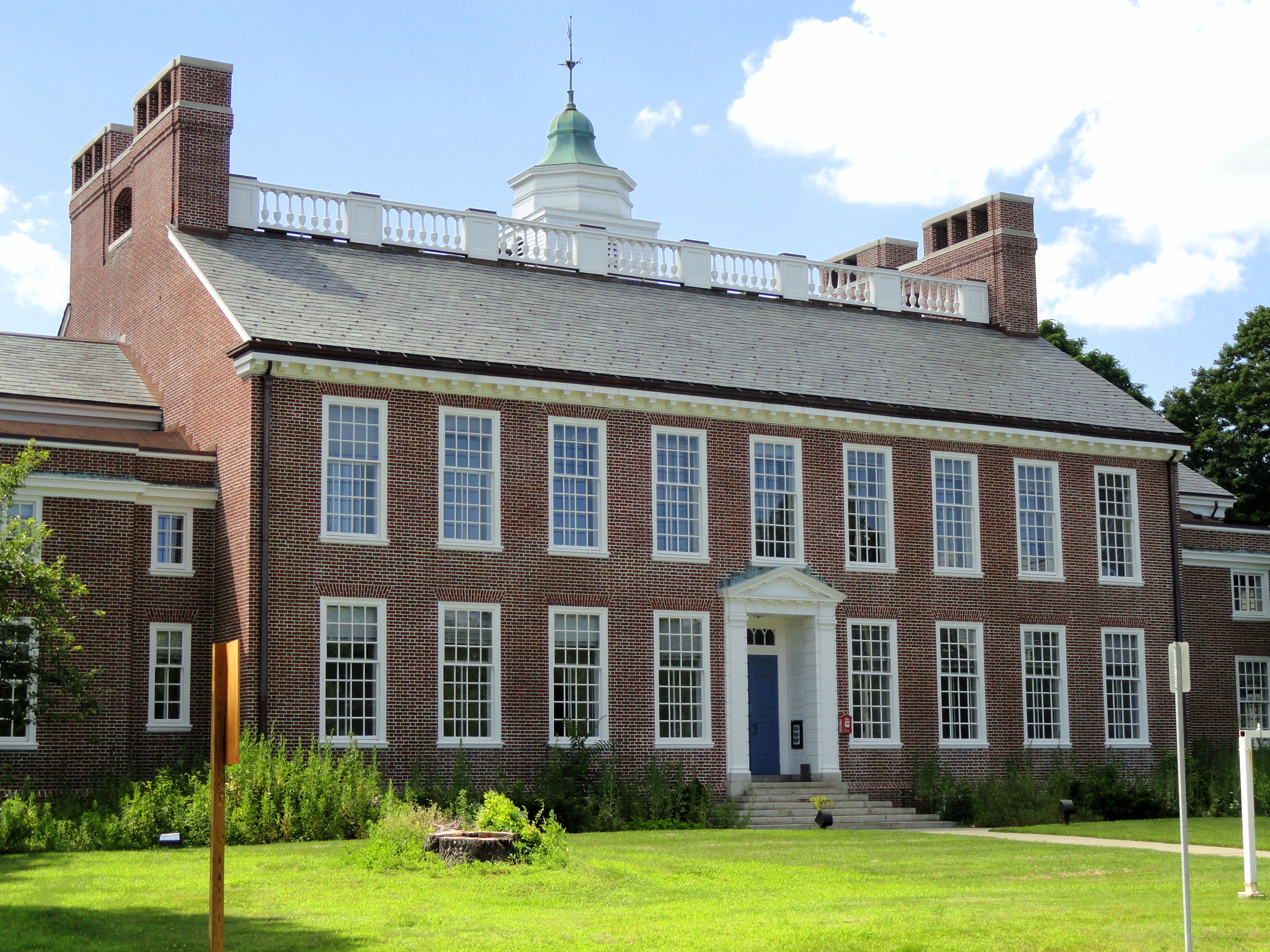
- Established: 1975
- Location: 14 Vernon St. Framingham, Massachusetts 01702
- Coordinates: 42°18′8.77″N 71°26′9.18″W
- Director: Jessica Roscio
- Website: danforth.framingham.edu

Danforth Art Museum at Framingham State University (formerly Danforth Museum of Art) is a museum and school in Framingham, Massachusetts. It is part of Framingham State University.

== History ==
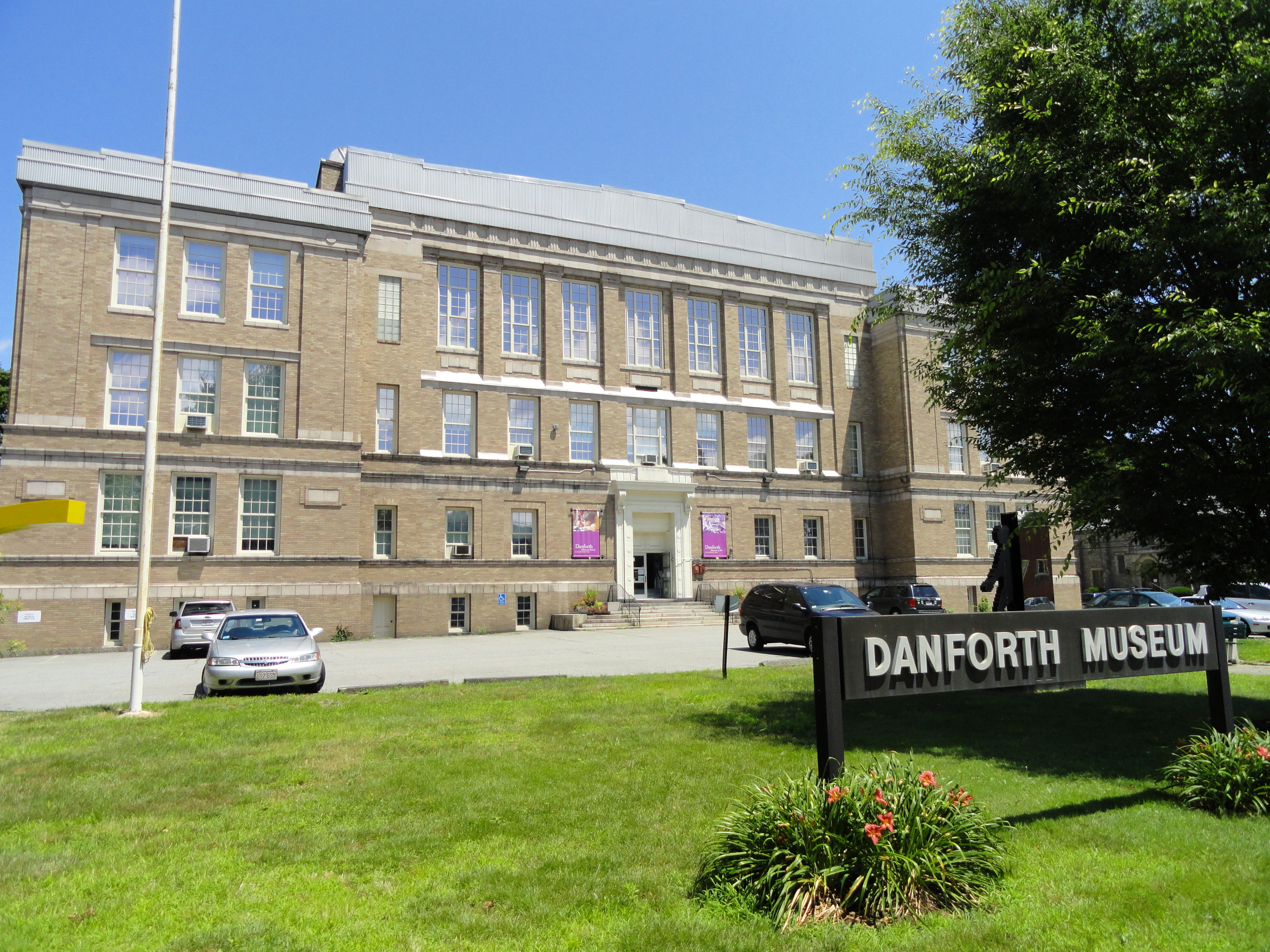
The museum's original building on Union Avenue

The Danforth Museum Corporation was established on August 9, 1973, as a 501 non-profit institution by a local group of community activists, educators, and art lovers. The Art Museum was opened to the public on May 24, 1975, at 123 Union Avenue, Framingham, featuring galleries for temporary exhibitions and a community art school.

In February 2013, the Museum purchased the Jonathan Maynard Building on Framingham's Centre Common, anticipating future renovation, as the institution's facilities on Union Avenue were increasingly outdated. The purchase proved timely; in May 2016, the building failed inspection and the Museum was evicted from its location.

In 2016, the Museum began negotiations with its neighbor, Framingham State University (FSU), to form a partnership to preserve the Museum for the benefit and enrichment of the community at large—the culmination of 40 years of collaboration. In March 2018, the partnership with FSU was finalized.

The Framingham State University Foundation assumed the care and ownership of the Museum's permanent collection. The Museum temporarily relocated so that construction to reopen the Museum's galleries could begin immediately. The Museum was closed to the public in August 2016.

In early 2017, the Museum offices and school reopened in the Maynard building; its collection was placed into storage for safekeeping, and select exhibitions were moved off-site.

The newly renovated Art Museum reopened in April 2019, featuring exhibitions that reflect on the Museum's history and its role within the greater Boston and MetroWest communities.

== Collections ==
The museum's permanent collection focuses on American Art from the 19th-century to the present, and includes work by Gilbert Stuart, Charles Sprague Pearce, Eastman Johnson, Albert Bierstadt, and Thomas Hart Benton, as well as work by the Boston Expressionists and contemporary artists such as Faith Ringgold, Richard Yarde, Barbara Grad, Andrew Stevovich, and Jason Berger.
