= David Aronson =

American painter (1923–2015)

- Born: October 28, 1923; Shilova, Lithuania
- Died: July 2, 2015 (aged 91); Natick, Massachusetts
- Education: Hebrew Teachers College
- Spouse: Georgianna Nyman

Christ Before Pilate by David Aronson, 1949

David Aronson (October 28, 1923 – July 2, 2015) was a painter and Professor of Art at Boston University.

== Biography ==
Aronson was born in Šiluva, Lithuania in 1923 to an Orthodox Jewish family. His father was a rabbi. He taught at Boston University from 1955 to his death in 2015, where he formed the Fine Art Department. As an artist, he exhibited in Chicago, Philadelphia, New York, Los Angeles, Tokyo, Paris, Rome, Berlin and Copenhagen, among others. His work is represented in over forty museums.

Aronson's work is associated with the school of Boston Expressionism.

Aronson died at the age of 91 on July 2, 2015, from pneumonia and chronic heart failure.

== Collections ==
- Art Institute of Chicago
- DeCordova Museum and Sculpture Park, Lincoln, Mass.
- Israel Museum, Jerusalem
- Keene State College, Keene, N.H.
- Metropolitan Museum of Art, New York
- Museum of Fine Arts, Boston
- Museum of Modern Art, New York
- New Britain Museum of American Art, New Britain, Connecticut
- National Academy Museum and School, New York
- Smithsonian American Art Museum, Washington, D.C.
- University of New Hampshire Museum of Art, Durham

== Awards ==
- Guggenheim Fellowship - List of Guggenheim Fellowships awarded in 1960
- Election as Academician at the National Academy of Design, New York in 1967
- Honorary Doctorate of Humane Letters from Hebrew College, Newton, Massachusetts.

== Exhibitions ==
- David Aronson: The Paradox - Danforth Museum of Art

== Images ==
- Silkscreen in MoMA Collection
- "Edmund Burke" bronze relief in the Smithsonian American Art Museum
- "Blind Samson" in the Smithsonian American Art Museum
