= Joyce Reopel =

American painter, draughtswoman, and sculptor (1933–2019)

- Born: January 21, 1933; Worcester, MA
- Died: January 16, 2019 (aged 85); Portsmouth, NH
- Education: Worcester Art Museum School; Ruskin School of Drawing & Fine Arts, Oxford University
- Known for: silver- and goldpoint drawings, paintings and sculpture
- Movement: Boston Expressionism
- Spouse: Mel Zabarsky
- Awards: American Academy of Arts & Letters: Arts & Letters Award; Ford Foundation Grant; National Institute of Arts & Letters (NIAL) Grant; Radcliffe Scholar; Yale-Norfolk Fellowship; Harvard/Radcliffe Bunting Institute Fellowship
- Website: joycereopel.com

Joyce Reopel (1933–2019) was an American painter, draughtswoman and sculptor who spent the first half of her career working on paper and gesso, in an array of old master media including pencil, aquatint, ink and wash, goldpoint — and an "impeccable" silverpoint. "[A]n extraordinary draftsman, working in the difficult medium of silverpoint and goldpoint," New York Times reviewer John Canaday said, "In this meticulous, demanding technique she draws with full assurance, building strong forms, frequently eerie, with unfaltering definition.... perfection." Noting that her work "reflect[ed] a scholarly interest in Renaissance masters," ARTnews also noted that Reopel's "self-possessed, incisive technique [was] devoted not only to conventional subjects (anatomy, flowers) but to such less traditional themes as pregnancy and childbirth"

Alongside sculptor Mariana Pineda and painters Barbara Swan, Hyman Bloom, Arthur Polonsky, Mel Zabarsky and others, Reopel's work helped upend a conservative art world for "non-traditional" artists and clear a path for other women artists. In the process, she helped pioneer the American art movement known as Boston Expressionism, now in its third or fourth generation, with a lasting local and national influence.

== Work ==
The subject of more than eight individual exhibitions in New York and Boston, Reopel was a Boris Mirski Gallery veteran (1959–1966), admired for her virtuosity, finely wrought detail and a lush sensuality that could "convey a pessimistic modern humanism," while also reflecting an interest in history that was sometimes also reflected in her depictions of historical themes or classical icons.

New York Magazine called Reopel both "an artisan as well as an artist," commenting that "[t]he artist seems consistently to search out that which lies behind the physical trait. And having discovered it, she presents it in whispers, with unusual understatement and economy." The results ranged from an expressive realism to a subtle surrealism and an outright grotesquerie, as well as, in the words of Art New England's Robert R. Craven, something "[d]ream-like, an Arcadia populated by Rubenesque nudes who, in an Ovidian sort of way, intertwine with trees and vines."

In mature form, Reopel's subtly emotive, even melancholy, rendering of her subjects, was also often lyrical in the vein of fellow Boston expressionist Arthur Polonsky. Some of this was due to a distinctive palette evolved from glints of silver, gold and lead-gray in the early years to subtle tones of grayed blue and green when Reopel turned to oils. Craven thought this palette "austere," noting that with its "unsaturated tones, forms sometimes become indistinguishable, morphing into or suggesting other forms — but always there is the sense of voluptuous luxury and surging life. Tree Nymph, for example, depicts, from an elevated perspective, a nude cradled in the boughs of a tree whose branches vaguely coalesce with her own "limbs."

A student of sculptor Leonard Baskin at the Worcester Art Museum School, then known as the "Mini-Met," Reopel shared Baskin's fascination with the human form, and his interest in fine arts printing, woodcut, sculpture, etching and typography. Her earliest work can be seen in a 1953 version of T.S. Eliot's The Hollow Men, which she illustrated and helped typeset as an art student. In 1958, she created pen-and-ink cover illustrations for Boston's Audience: A Quarterly Review of Literature and the Arts in an issue featuring several of Anne Sexton's poems and Arthur Polonsky's interior illustration. Reopel also went on to design many of the catalogues for her 1960s and 1970s aquatint, silver- and goldpoint exhibitions at Boston's Boris Mirski Gallery and, in New York, the Corber Gallery and founder Bella Fishco's Forum Gallery.

== Education, Awards & Honors ==
A graduate of the Worcester Art Museum School, Reopel also spent two years studying at the Ruskin School of Drawing and Fine Arts at Oxford University. Earning recognition and laudits for her work, Reopel was a member of the Radcliffe Society of Fellows, and a recipient of numerous recognitions:

=== Fellowships ===
- Radcliffe Institute Fellowship at the Bunting Institute, since renamed the Radcliffe Institute for Advanced Study at Harvard
- Yale Norfolk School of Art fellowship

=== Grants ===
- Ford Foundation grant in sculpture and drawing
- National Institute of Arts & Letters (NIAL) grant presented by Institute President George F. Kennan
- Radcliffe Scholar for Independent Study grant
- Wheaton College research grant

=== Awards ===
- Arts & Letters Award from the American Academy of Arts & Letters

== Exhibitions ==
- Boris Mirski Gallery, Boston
- Boston Arts Festival, MA
- Circulo de Bellas Artes, Madrid
- Cober Gallery, NYC
- Currier Museum of Art, Manchester, NH
- DeCordova Museum and Sculpture Park, Lincoln, MA
- Federal Reserve Bank, Boston
- Forum Gallery, NYC
- Galerie Internationale, NYC
- Museum of Art, Durham, NH
- National Institute of Arts & Letters (NIAL)
- New Bedford Art Museum, MA
- New York State Council on the Arts, NY
- Rew Dex Gallery, Kyoto
- Salones Berkowitsch, Madrid
- Tragos Gallery, NYC
- Victoria & Albert Museum, London

== Collections ==
- Addison Gallery of American Art, Andover, MA
- Canton Museum of Art, Canton, OH
- Currier Museum of Art, Manchester, NH
- Fogg Art Museum at Harvard University, Cambridge, MA
- Weisman Art Museum, Minneapolis, MN
- Museum of Art, Durham, NH
- Ohio State University, Columbus
- Pennsylvania Academy of Fine Arts (PAFA)
- Rhode Island School of Design (RISD) Museum, Providence
- Sloan Art Library, University of North Carolina, Chapel Hill
- Worcester Public Library, Worcester Biography Files
- University of Massachusetts, Amherst
- Vanderbilt University, Fine Arts Gallery Collection, Nashville, TN

== Archives ==
Reopel (Zabarsky), Joyce:

- Art & Artist files, Smithsonian American Art Museum/National Portrait Gallery Library, Washington, DC
- Folder, Smithsonian American Art Museum/National Portrait Gallery Library, Washington, DC
- Historic Preservation Papers – MS067 Portsmouth Athenaeum, NH
- Toshihiro Katayama posters, Houghton Library, MA
- Radcliffe College Archives sound recordings collection, 1951-2008, Schlesinger Library, Radcliffe Institute, MA
- Records of the Radcliffe College Alumnae Association, Cambridge, MA
- Records of the Mary Ingraham Bunting Institute, 1933-2008, Schlesinger Library, Radcliffe Institute, MA

== Publications/Notable Reproductions ==
- The Hollow Men, WAM Press, Reopel and Sorenson, 1953
- Joyce Reopel: Drawings in silverpoint and goldpoint, November 9th through December 4th, 1965
- Joyce Reopel: Drawings in silverpoint, goldpoint, and pencil: January 22nd through February 15th, 1969
- The Liberal Context, Issues 1–9, 1–17. Edited by Cudhea, David W., with Anne Chiarenza, Gobin Stair, Orloff Miller. Published by College Centers Committee of American Unitarian Association in cooperation with Liberal Religious Youth (LRY) Inc. Art by Joyce Reopel and others, 1961-1966

== Personal life ==
Born in Worcester, MA in 1933, and raised in nearby Auburn, Reopel was the only child of homemaker Ada (née Anderson) and musician Ernest J. Reopel, Jr. A first cousin to scientist Paul Englund on her mother's side, Reopel was also a distant cousin to renowned French Canadian painter Jean-Paul Riopelle, Grand Officer of the National Order of Québec, on her father's. In 1955, she married painter and fellow Worcester Art Museum School graduate Mel Zabarsky.

Her other professional endeavors included time spent teaching at the Swain School of Design, the University of New Hampshire and elsewhere. In 1976, a life-long interest in politics helped her win a two-year term in the New Hampshire House of Representatives. A respect for history and passion for architecture led to her interest in preservation, the documented history of her own house and the co-founding of the Portsmouth Historic District Commission.

== Bibliography ==
- Butler, Cornelia H., et al. WACK! Art and the Feminist Revolution. United Kingdom: Museum of Contemporary Art, 2007. ISBN 978-0-914357-99-5, 0-914357-99-9
- Falk, Peter Hastings (ed). Who Was Who in American Art, 1564-1975: 400 years of artists in America. (3 Volumes.) Madison, CT: Sound View Press, 1999. ISBN ISBN 978-0-932087-57-7
- Lafo, Rachel R. Painting in Boston: 1950-2000. University of Massachusetts Press, 2002; ISBN 978-1-55849-364-3
- Nemser, Cindy, et al. Feminist Art Journal, vol. 3, no. 1, 1974. JSTOR 28036286. Accessed 30 Aug. 2021.
- Schwartz, Barry. The New Humanism: Art in a Time of Change. Praeger Publishers, 1974; ISBN 978-0715368251
- Walkey, Frederick P. New England Women. Decordova Museum, 1975; OCLC 2378529
- Audience: The Quarterly Review of Literature & the Arts, Vol. 5, Issue 3. Audience Press, 1958; ISBN 9780960177424
- Collected Visions: Women Artists at the Bunting Institute, 1961-1986, Cambridge, Mass.: Mary Ingraham Bunting Institute, Radcliffe College, 1986; ISBN 978-0960177424
- Humanism in New England Art. De Cordova Museum Publisher, Lincoln, MA, 1970; ISBN 1-55849-364-6
