= Mel Zabarsky =

American figurative painter (1932–2019)

- Born: August 21, 1932; Worcester, Massachusetts, U.S.
- Died: December 5, 2019 (aged 87)
- Education: Worcester Art Museum School; Ruskin School of Drawing & Fine Arts, Oxford University; Boston University; University of Cincinnati
- Known for: Paintings
- Notable work: Surrealist political and historic painting
- Movement: Boston Expressionism
- Spouse: Joyce Reopel
- Website: https://www.melzabarsky.com

Melvin Joel Zabarsky (1932–2019) was an American figurative painter who created representational work in the narrative tradition. Known for a bright, bold palette, his work often explores political, historical and cultural themes to surreal and realist effect. In a six-decade career marked by several distinct phases, Zabarsky's imaginative use of color, formal experimentation and commitment to narrative organization in both traditional and avant garde styles are hallmarks of his work. In an interview with the British philosophers Donald and Monica Skilling, he said, "I'm discovering history, or a narrative, within a painting, as I go along."

That sensibility is in keeping with what Boston Globe critic Robert Taylor defined as "urban, Jewish, introverted and lyrical," which he credits to the artists championed by art dealer Boris Mirski, Boston's leading gallerist from 1944 to 1979, and his NYC counterpart, Edith Halpert of the Downtown Gallery. This group included Zabarsky, fellow artist and wife Joyce Reopel, Hyman Bloom, Barbara Swan, Jack Levine, Marianna Pineda, Harold Tovish and others, who helped overcome Boston's conservative distaste for the avant-garde, occasionally female, and often Jewish artists later classified as Boston expressionists. Unique to New England, the art movement had lasting national and local influence, and is now in its third generation.

== Background & education ==
The third of four children, and a first-generation Russian-American, Zabarsky was born in Worcester, MA in 1932 to Anna Pearl (née Glazer) and Max, Lithuanian and Ukrainian immigrants respectively, the latter from Kiev. Raised in Worcester's historic Green Island/Union Hill, an area settled by Lithuanian Jews attracted by the local industry, Zabarsky was twice orphaned by the age of 16. His older sister Goldie, a fashion merchandiser, took over as head of household, while his much elder brother, already living with a family of his own, worked as a commercial artist.

Zabarsky started drawing and painting at an early age, and dreamed of becoming a cartoonist. By 17, his sights had turned to fine arts. He trained for one year with the artist and educator Leonard Baskin at the Worcester Art Museum School, alongside his future wife, painter and writer Joyce Reopel, and his childhood friend, printmaker Sidney Hurwitz.

Drafted at 19, Zabarsky was stationed in Stuttgart, Germany during the Korean War. He married Reopel upon his return to the U.S. in 1955. They both enrolled at the Ruskin School of Drawing & Fine Arts, Oxford University where they remained until 1957. They returned to the U.S. for additional study, with Zabarsky later graduating from the School of Fine & Applied Arts at Boston University with a BFA in 1958, and from the Graduate School of Arts & Sciences at the University of Cincinnati with an MFA in 1960.

== Career ==
=== Early political work ===
From the late 1950s to the mid-1970s, Zabarsky's paintings featured political themes, semi-realist portraiture and stylized trompe l'oeil geometric backgrounds. Typically spotlighting cultural figures, such as Che Guevara in The Argentinian Cyclist (1969–70) or Massachusetts labor leader Arnold Dubin beside cameos of Paul Robeson and Jimmy Hoffa garnered attention. Still more potent was his work around civil rights, in paintings such as The Artist and the Assassin (1965), which featured an ailing Lincoln, John Wilkes Booth, haunting Klansmen, and a wild horse. Atlantic Cortege, another in this series, spotlights an African American funeral centered on a coffin. Meanwhile, an earlier painting The Hanging of the Hare (1957–58) explored similar themes, but more allusively, by referencing Dürer's Young Hare watercolor.

=== Dada and still-life realism ===
By the 1970s, Zabarsky's geometry began to look more like still life, his palette lightened and edges softened. The eponymous Teeth on a Pedestal (1974) is one of several Dada or Absurdist pieces from this period, glorifying in teeth, or dentures, often posed beside a model of a muscular man.

=== Biblical themes ===
A Spanish sabbatical in the mid-80s moved Zabarsky toward more traditional European narrative styles. A multi-year exploration of Old Testament themes in representational style followed, and over the course of several paintings (e.g. Red Room [1975-76], The Garden [1980]) he accrued a large body of work collectively known as the Susannah and the Elders series. This formalism ceased with a trip to Japan in the early 1990s. His studio limitations there morphed his signature interest in geometry into looser, wilder collage. The change in technique affected his narrative voice and palette, which was suddenly dappled with vibrant yellow, streaks of purple and acid green. The sharp borders of earlier decades disappeared, and canvas was pasted upon canvas, with color extending past the painting onto the frame. More expressionist than realist, this work in aggregate was freer and more energetic than his earlier approach, as shown in The True Story of Prometheus (1997–98) and Tropical Tropism (1994).

=== History, Surrealism and Judaism ===
From 1999 to 2009, Zabarsky explored the Jewish self and the American and European other in the collection Surreal Histories. The collection distills themes into both a straightforward “public history” of Ernest and Pauline Hemingway in Spain after the Spanish Civil War in Spanish Panorama (Hemingway’s Version) and the idiosyncratic “personal history” Oslo Sun and Vienna Moon. The latter features bursts of bright color and a bold off-center composition that spans Edvard Munch’s The Scream, Sigmund and Anna Freud and the painter Balthus smashing through rich blues, crimsons, violets and sunny yellows to cross cultures, types and textures all gently bound together by the scrawled word “contemporaries.”

=== University work ===
Also an educator, Zabarsky taught art for nearly three decades at various institutions including the Swain School of Design, Wheaton College and the University of New Hampshire. At the latter, he also served as chair of the Department of Art and Art History, and was instrumental in developing the Bachelor of Fine Arts program, in addition to helping found the Museum of Art and the Master of Fine Arts (MFA) degree in painting.

== Honors and awards ==
Zabarsky was the recipient of numerous grants and awards, including a Ford Foundation Grant in the Humanities, a Stone Foundation Fellowship for work in Italy, a National Institute of Arts & Letters nomination and prizes at the Boston Arts Festival.

== Exhibitions ==
His solo exhibitions included shows at Kyoto's Rew Dex Gallery, Madrid's Salones Berkowitsch and Circulo de Bellas Artes. In the U.S., he had one-person shows at the DeCordova Museum & Sculpture Park, the Wheaten Beard & Weil Galleries, formerly known as the Watson Gallery, the Boris Mirski Gallery and Edith Halbert's Downtown Gallery.

== Public collections ==
His paintings and drawings can be found in many public institutions, including MOMA, the Museum of Art, Ein Harod (Israel), the Wiggins Collection at the Boston Public Library, the Addison Gallery of American Art, the Currier Gallery of Art, Williams College Museum of Art, Keene State College, University Museum of Contemporary Art (Amherst, MA), the Danforth Museum and the Museum of Art at the University of New Hampshire.

== Public references ==
- DeCordova and Dana Museum and Park. Expressionism in Boston, 1945-1985. New York: American Ceramics, 1986.
- Hyde, Andrew C. Boston Now. Boston Institute of Contemporary Art, 1969.
- Krantz, Les. The New York Art Review. Chicago: American References Publishing Corp., Collier Books Edition, 1983.
- Lafo, Rachel R.; Capasso, Nicholas; Uhrhane, Jennifer. Painting in Boston: 1950-2000. Massachusetts: University of Massachusetts Press, 2002.
- Miles, Margaret R. Carnal Knowing: Female Nakedness and Religious Meaning in the Christian West. Oregon: Wipf & Stock Pub, 2006.
- Nickel, Karl. Young New England Painters. Florida: Ringling Museum Publishers, 1969.
- Schwartz, Barry. The New Humanism: Art in a Time of Change. New York: Praeger Publishers, 1974.
- Walkey, Frederick P. Zabarsky. (Foreword by Carl Goldstein). Massachusetts: DeCordova Museum Publishers, 1970.
- Past Into Present: Paintings by M. Zabarsky. Conversation with Donald & Monica Skilling and poem by Charles Simic. The Art Gallery, University of New Hampshire, 2000.

== Interviews ==
- Melvin J. Zabarsky, "Oral History Interview." Veterans History Project, American Folklife Center, Library of Congress video, 42:06, March 30, 2015. https://stream-media.loc.gov/vhp/video/afc2001001_094006_mv0001001_640x480_800.mp4

== See also ==
- American Figurative Expressionism
- Archives of American Art
- List of Jewish American visual artists
