= Paul England =

Paul England may refer to:

- Paul England (actor) (1893–1968), English actor, singer, author, and translator
- Paul England (racing driver) (1929–2014), Australian former racing driver

== See also ==
- Paul Englund, American biochemist
- Paula England, American sociologist
