= Audience (magazine) =

American literary magazine, 1955–1973

Audience: A Quarterly Review of Literature and the Arts
- Cover of the Spring 1958 issue
- Editor: Ralph Maud, Anthony Cowan, Peter Michael Wyman
- Categories: Literary and fine arts periodical
- Frequency: Irregularly — fortnightly, bimonthly, quarterly
- Format: Soft cover, print
- Circulation: Limited edition
- Publisher: The Audience Press
- Founded: 1955
- First issue: February 1955
- Final issue Number: 1973; Vol. 8
- Country: United States
- Based in: Boston
- Language: English

Audience: A Quarterly Review of Literature and the Arts, also sometimes known as Audience, was an American literary magazine founded in Cambridge, Massachusetts, in 1955. In its early incarnation, the magazine cultivated, disseminated and built a lasting historical record of early mid-century work from notable figures in arts and letters, many of whom would go on to acclaim, including poets Sylvia Plath, Anne Sexton, George Starbuck and Piero Heliczer; artists Joyce Reopel and Arthur Polonsky; writer Roger Shattuck and writer-comedian Zero Mostel.

From 1971 to 1973, the magazine was published solely as Audience, and although it was clearly targeted to hip intellectuals and literary arts aficionados serious about their culture, the emphasis on best-in-class continued. Influential graphic designers Milton Glazer and Seymour Chwait were hired to direct art that spanned illustration, multi-page photo essays and graphic design, and contributions from visual artists like filmmakers Gordon Parks and Frank Capra and Austrian photographer Inge Morath. Their work accompanied and illustrated an astonishing array of work by novelists, short story writers, poets and screenwriters, including six Nobel prize winners: Maya Angelou, Saul Bellow, William Golding, William Faulkner, Ernest Hemingway and Nadine Gordimer, and three Pulitzer prize winners: John Cheever, Arthur Miller, John Updike. In addition to these cultural heavyweights, the magazine also published, in a mere two-year span, Nelson Algren, Margaret Atwood, W.H. Auden, James Baldwin, Thomas Berger, Jorge Luis Borges, Frank Capra, Raymond Carver, Don DeLillo, Joan Didion, Joseph Heller, Jack Kerouac, Vladimir Nabokov, Cynthia Ozick, Walker Percy, George Plimpton, Philip Roth. In 1973, lack of funding forced the magazine to shut down.

== Audience: A Quarterly Review of Literature and the Arts ==
Donald Hall was among the early advisory group to the rotating series of editors that included Ralph Maud, Anthony Cowan and Peter Michael Wyman whose strong links to Harvard were clear from early contributor lists and a Harvard faculty and student discount rate for an annual subscription.

In 1958, the magazine took a half-page advertisement in the literary magazine Prairie Schooner, published by the University of Nebraska Press, announcing the first Audience Awards for fiction and poetry, published between June 1958 and June 1959. Winners were awarded $100 and $50, respectively, and there were no restrictions as to age, nationality or status.

Despite an erratic publishing schedule that veered from fortnightly to bimonthly to quarterly, a cover price that rose from 10 cents a copy to $1.25 in only a few years and a variable subtitle, by 1959, the magazine was listing its price in both dollars and francs. The following year, however, it was once again advertising itself as quarterly.

== Audience (1971–73) ==
Under the editorial oversight of Tim Hill, L. Rust Hills, James F. Fixx, Robert Strozier and Geoffrey C. Ward, the magazine was reborn in 1971 as a high-end, subscription-only bimonthly arts and literature periodicals. Under the headline "Outfox the Fellow in the Bright Nightgown," they sought out subscribers with full-page ads in New York Magazine by boasting of an editorial board that included "Alan Arkin, Saul Bellow, Robert Bolt, John Cassavetes, Charles Eames, Philip Johnson, Marisol, Gordan Parks, Anne Sexton, Robert Penn Warren, Tom Wicker, John A. Williams [and] ... charter subscription rates in perpetuity" for early takers. They also touted their graphic design bona fides, noting that their pilot magazine, designed by cutting-edge graphic designers Milton Glaser and Seymour Chwast, had already won the top award of the Society of Publication Designers.

But by 1973, editor-in-chief Tim Hill told The New York Times that losses were already expected to run "well into seven figures". He said that the magazine had been underfinanced.
