= Lawrence Kupferman =

American painter

Lawrence Edward Kupferman
- Born: March 25, 1909; Boston, Massachusetts, U.S.
- Died: October 2, 1982 (aged 73); Boston, Massachusetts, U.S.
- Education: School of the Museum of Fine Arts, Boston; Massachusetts College of Art
- Spouse: Ruth Cobb

Lawrence Kupferman (1909–1982) was an American painter associated with the Boston Expressionist school in the early 1940s, and later, with Abstract Expressionism. He chaired the Painting Department at the Massachusetts College of Art, where he was known for introducing innovative practices and techniques.

== Early life and education ==
Kupferman was born in the Dorchester neighborhood of Boston in 1909, the son of Samuel and Rose Kupferman. Like his contemporaries, Jack Levine and Hyman Bloom, he grew up in a working-class family. His father was an Austrian Jewish immigrant who worked as a cigar maker. His mother died in 1914, and five-year-old Lawrence was sent to live with his grandparents. Antisemitism was pervasive in Boston at the time, and Kupferman was bullied as a child. Years later he recalled, "Being a short, homely Jewish kid in a predominantly Irish-Catholic, snobby town, I admit, I was a lonely, misunderstood, introverted boy."

Kupferman attended the Boston Latin School and took part in the high school art program at the Museum of Fine Arts, Boston. In the late 1920s he studied drawing under Philip Leslie Hale at the Museum School (an experience he called "stultifying and repressive"). In 1932 he transferred to the Massachusetts College of Art, where he first met his wife, the artist Ruth Cobb. He returned briefly to the Museum School in 1946 to study with the influential German-American painter Karl Zerbe.

== Career ==
Evening Tide, 1948

Kupferman held various jobs while pursuing a career as an artist, including two years as a security guard at the Museum of Fine Arts, Boston. During the 1930s he worked as a drypoint etcher for the Federal Art Project, creating architectural drawings in a strictly realistic style very different from his later work. (For examples, see his drawings at the Fogg Museum and the Smithsonian.) In the 1940s he began incorporating more expressionistic forms into his paintings, and from then on his work became increasingly abstract. In 1946 he began spending summers in Provincetown, Massachusetts, where he met and was influenced by Mark Rothko, Hans Hofmannn, Jackson Pollock, and other abstract painters. Around the same time he began exhibiting his work at the Boris Mirski Gallery on Newbury Street.

=== ICA controversy ===
In 1948, Kupferman was at the center of a controversy involving hundreds of Boston-area artists. That February, the Boston Institute of Modern Art issued a manifesto titled "'Modern Art' and the American Public" decrying "the excesses of modern art," and announced it was changing its name to the Institute of Contemporary Art (ICA). The poorly written statement, intended to distinguish Boston's art scene from that of New York, was widely perceived as an attack on modernism. In protest, Boston artists such as Karl Zerbe, Jack Levine, and David Aronson formed the Modern Artists Group and organized a mass meeting. On March 21, 300 artists, students, and other supporters met at the Old South Meeting House and demanded that the ICA retract its statement. Kupferman chaired the meeting and read a statement to the press:

The recent manifesto of the Institute is a fatuous declaration which misinforms and misleads the public concerning the integrity and intention of the modern artist. By arrogating to itself the privilege of telling the artists what art should be the Institute runs counter to the original purposes of this organization whose function was to encourage and to assimilate contemporary innovation.

Among the other speakers were Karl Knaths, H. W. Janson, Zerbe, Levine, and Aronson. At the same time, conservatives applauded the manifesto and exploited the situation for political purposes. In May 1950, the ICA issued a joint statement with the Museum of Modern Art and the Whitney Museum of American Art affirming the value of modern and abstract art.

=== Later years ===
Kupferman became a professor at the Massachusetts College of Art, and went on to chair its Painting Department. He retired in 1969. Much of his later work is characterized by "abstract, marinelike amoeboid forms." Of his 1948 painting, Evening Tide (shown), he said, "This might be at the deepest bottom of an ocean, where light comes only from microscopic life forms, or it could be out, far beyond Venus, where things collect and begin again...Life is mysterious. I find relevance in the abstract, for in it is the womb of existence."

He died of Parkinson's disease in Boston on October 2, 1982. His work is included in the permanent collections of the Museum of Modern Art, the Smithsonian American Art Museum, the Museum of Fine Arts, Boston, the Fogg Museum, and other museums and private collectors. His papers are on file with the Archives of American Art and Syracuse University. Kupferman's papers at the Archives of American Art include an unpublished historical novel, Beggar's Bread, which depicts the Boston art scene of the 1930s.
