= Boris Mirski Gallery =

American art gallery

The Boris Mirski Gallery
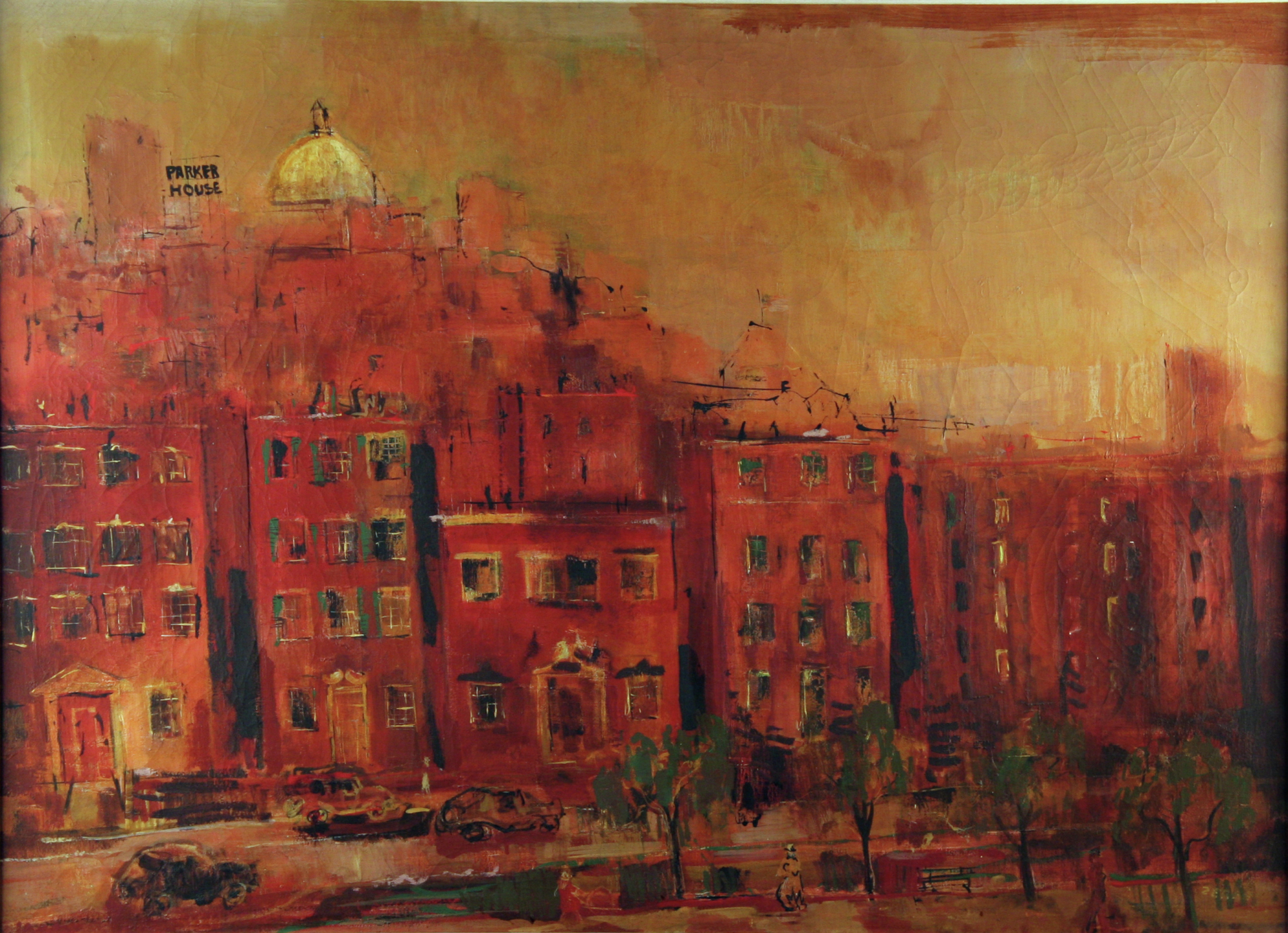
- Boston's Beacon Hill by Mirski artist Karl Zerbe.
- Formation: 1944; 82 years ago
- Founder: Boris Mirski
- Dissolved: 1979; 47 years ago
- Type: Art gallery
- Headquarters: 166 Newbury Street Boston, Massachusetts, U.S.
- Services: Mounted solo, group, and touring exhibitions of figurative and abstract Avant-garde, Boston Expressionist and African art. Also provided framing services and fine arts instruction.
- Gallery director: Alan Fink

The Boris Mirski Gallery (1944–1979) was a Boston art gallery owned by Boris Chaim Mirski (1898–1974). The gallery was known for exhibiting key figures in Boston Expressionism, New York and international modern art styles and non-western art. For years, the gallery dominated with both figurative and African work. As an art dealer, Mirski was known for supporting young, emerging artists, including many Jewish-Americans, as well as artists of color, women artists and immigrants. As a result of Mirski's avant-garde approach to art and diversified approach to dealing art, the gallery was at the center of Boston's burgeoning modern mid-century art scene, as well as instrumental in the birth and development of Boston Expressionism, the most significant branch of American Figurative Expressionism.

== Organization ==
=== Founder ===
Born to a well-to-do Jewish lumber dealer in Vilnius, Lithuania, Mirski was raised amid "pomp ... pogroms and persecution". He immigrated to the U.S. in 1912 at age 14, settling with a maternal aunt. His first job involved "lugging room molding on his shoulders", and linked both his father's field, and a key future source of his earnings as a framer. In between, Mirski studied sculpture, and found employment on a merchant vessel that allowed him to travel the world.

Art New England writer Lois Tarlow called Mirski "a colorful figure who played an important and daring role in bringing young avant-garde artists to the Boston public, [who] was also a disarming and lovable rogue". Painter Ralph Coburn, who assisted gallery director Hyman Swetzoff at Mirski's Gallery, describes "elements of slapstick comedy, working for Mirski.... He was short, rotund, balding, immensely powerful, strong. He was physically strong. He could lift all kinds of stuff. He was ambitious. He was immensely charming. He was a scoundrel. I loved working for him."

The Boston Globe posthumously assessed Mirski in more dignified fashion, calling him "a figure of pivotal significance in Boston art for more than half-a-century." In the Globe's obituary, they also traced his first Boston gallery back to 1916, counted another three galleries, and several locales until they reached his second to last, on Charles Street, where the art part was subsidized by a frame shop, a posh clientele and his growing appeal to local artists.

In 1935, Mirski moved the gallery to upscale Newbury Street where it would remain for the next four decades. In 1945, he moved into the red brick mansion at 166 Newbury Street, the historic heart of Boston's art scene, and right next door to the "stuffy" Guild of Boston Artists and only steps away from the Boston Museum of Modern Art, a sister museum to the Museum of Modern Art (MOMA) that evolved into the Institute of Contemporary Art, Boston (ICA) in 1948. Here, he opened a larger gallery, a frame shop and a school in the building he bought in 1945, at the depressed wartime price of $500. In the 1950s, 101 Bradford Street in Provincetown, Massachusetts also served as the Mirski Gallery's summertime residence.

In 1979, the Boris Mirski Gallery on 166 Newbury Street Gallery finally closed. Mirski, himself, had died five years earlier, in 1974, in Tel Aviv, Israel.

=== National attention ===
In the fall of 1946, the Mirski Gallery's first exhibition debuted with 53 paintings by the Guatemalan "Indian" cubist Carlos Mérida. The Boston Globe highlighted critic A.J. Philpott's confusion in the review's headline: "Merida Moderns May Be Childish or Wonderful — Philpott Baffled". A week later, Time magazine commented that some critics already considered Mérida's work worthy of expanding "The Big Three of Latin American art" (Rivera, Orozco, Siqueiros)' to four.

In 1949, Mirski, who did not then represent Hyman Bloom (1913-2009), borrowed work from the Museum of Modern Art, Harvard and Durlacher Gallery in New York, and organized a Bloom retrospective at the Mirski Gallery. The show was meant to build on Bloom's 1942 group show success at MOMA, which had hung 13 of his paintings and purchased two of them. Soon after, the career–making critic Clement Greenberg referred to Bloom as "the greatest artist in America". As former Danforth Museum of Art Director Katherine French described it, "There was a period of about six months when Hyman Bloom was the most important painter in the world, and probably a period of about five years when he was the most important painter in America." Mirski's show garnered praise from Time magazine, which commented that the show's most newsworthy paintings "seemed to come straight from charnel house and morgue". They also praised Mirski as "an old hand at presenting local artists to Boston society". In critic Sydney Freedberg's Art News review, he called Bloom, "a painter of the first importance within his generation". Abstract expressionist stars Jackson Pollock and Willem de Kooning, meanwhile, called him "the first abstract expressionist in America".

=== Boston school of expressionist art ===
After establishing the gallery on the main floor of his new building, Mirski subsidized it with a frame shop in the basement. "He was juggling everything, the frame shop, the mortgages", painter Ralph Coburn (born 1923) said. "He kept refinancing the building, which he bought for a song, but sometimes business was bad and the thing that held the gallery together was the frame shop, and so he managed." In 1982, Alan Fink, then owner of the Alpha Gallery, explained to The Boston Globe that few galleries survive on selling contemporary work, citing the costs of publicity and the opening night reception as a few of the many expenditures gallerists face. Mirski handled some of these expenditures by diversifying his sources of income and by enlisting artists to help with the publicity. Mirski artist Leonard Baskin (1922–2000), for example, engraved Mirski's gallery mark for him in 1956. Baskin also created many of his own exhibition posters, which he later collected in a book.

In addition, Mirski created the Boris Mirski School of Modern Art — on the third floor where he had some of his people teaching there — John [Woodrow] Wilson (1922–2015), Esther Geller (1921–2015)". Later, Carl Nelson who had studied at the Art Students League of New York, and who later became a "piller of the Cambridge Art Association", joined the staff. He was "[a] man of an enormous ... influence, [he] had a different method of teaching from the Museum School.... He was able to visualize the whole painting."

The gallery was used for exhibitions and art-related lectures, including, for example, a series on Mérida that coincided with the gallery's first show. According to painter Ralph Coburn, Mirski was also known for giving "wonderful parties" ... [t]here was a large mailing list.... that perhaps Hyman Swetzoff had brought over from the Institute of Modern Art, and it consisted of all kinds of museum directors and collectors especially in Boston."

Mirski's gallery also served as home base for local art activism. In the late 1940s, many artists, including Karl Zerbe (1903–1972) and Hyman Bloom began meeting to address fears that the recently renamed ICA was, like the Museum of Fine Arts, shutting out local artists. The meetings inspired the formation of the New England Chapter of Artists Equity and the Boston Arts Festival, with the former advocating for artists' rights and representation, and the latter providing a democratic fine arts forum in the middle of Boston's Public Garden.

The result was a "sea change" described by art historian Charles Giuliano in the late 1940s, altering Boston's notoriously conservative art scene, which had long been dominated by genteel Impressionist painters of the historic Boston School, with few local collectors or galleries interested in collecting or exhibiting modern art:

The faculty and focus of the School of the Museum of Fine Arts changed from polite and innocuous, ersatz American Impressionism to gritty and graphic Boston Expressionism. The old guard and its socially acceptable artists showed with the Copley Society of Art or the Guild of Boston Artists. The young Turks, Jews, and immigrants or their sons—like the Lebanese-American Gibran—showed with gallerist Boris Mirski or his former assistants Hyman Swetzoff and Alan Fink of Alpha Gallery.

The gallery also hosted exchange shows with Edith Halpert's Downtown Gallery in New York, serving as an important venue for the broader Northeast, as well as for local artists who were Jewish or foreign-born like Hyman Bloom, Giglio Dante (1914-2006) and Kahlil Gibran (1883-1931), Black like John Woodrow Wilson or female like Marianna Pineda (1925–1996) and Joyce Reopel (1932–2019). Alan Fink (1926–2017), who managed the gallery in the 1950s and early 60s, later recalled:

The Mirski Gallery was very conservative by today's standards, but in the '50s it was considered daring. We got protests for showing artists who are now famous and not considered controversial in the least, artists like Hans Hoffmann and Leonard Baskin. And the Boston police once took a picture of a nude out of our window... Mirski and a couple of other galleries were the only ones selling modern art in Boston at the time.

=== Artists ===
Mirski cultivated his artists by providing direct support in much the same way he cultivated his businesses. In the case of Bernard Chaet, that included funding his first art tour of Europe, mounting his first show in 1946, and recommending him for his first teaching job at Yale. But Mirski's combination support for paid work, exhibitions and study appealed to experienced artists too. Two of the most influential were successive directors of the Department of Drawing and Painting at the School of the Museum of Fine Arts, Boston: Alexander Jacovleff (1887–1938) Karl Zerbe (1903–1972) who served for three years each, starting with Jacovleff in 1934 and ending with Zerbe in 1940. The latter's emphasis on individualism helped attract artists like David Aronson (1923–2015), Bernard Chaet (1924–2012), Reed Kay, Arthur Polonsky, Jack Kramer (1923–1984), Barbara Swan (1922–2003), Andrew Kooistra (1926–), and Lois Tarlow.

Boston Globe critic Robert Taylor contrasted Mirski's aesthetic with that of two other important Boston gallerists, Margaret Brown and Hyman Swetzoff. Mirski, he said, introduced an "urban, Jewish, introverted and lyrical" visual sensibility to Boston. In Mirski's obituary, he extrapolated, describing Mirski's Boston school of artists as "ethnic, urban and strident.... It had a sardonic eye. In style the images were figurative, and Rembrandt's lighting, Rembrandt's Biblical drama enthralled the Boston artists, though they were also open to German Expressionism and some aspects of Matisse and Rouault."

==== By name ====
(Key figures are listed below, but the list is not comprehensive.)

- Marta Adams
- David Aronson
- Leonard Baskin
- Jason Berger
- Hyman Bloom
- William Brice
- Bernard Chaet
- Ralston Crawford
- Esther Geller
- Kahlil Gibran
- Hans Hofmann
- Ellsworth Kelly
- Lawrence Kupferman
- Rico Lebrun
- Jack Levine
- Michael Mazur
- Carlos Mérida
- George Lovett Kingsland Morris
- Carl Gustaf Nelson
- Georgia O'Keeffe
- Arthur Polonsky
- Joyce Reopel
- Ben Shahn
- Mitchell Siporin
- William Steig
- Barbara Swan
- Harold Tovish
- John Woodrow Wilson
- Mel Zabarsky
- Karl Zerbe

==== By representative work ====
(Selection was limited by availability.)

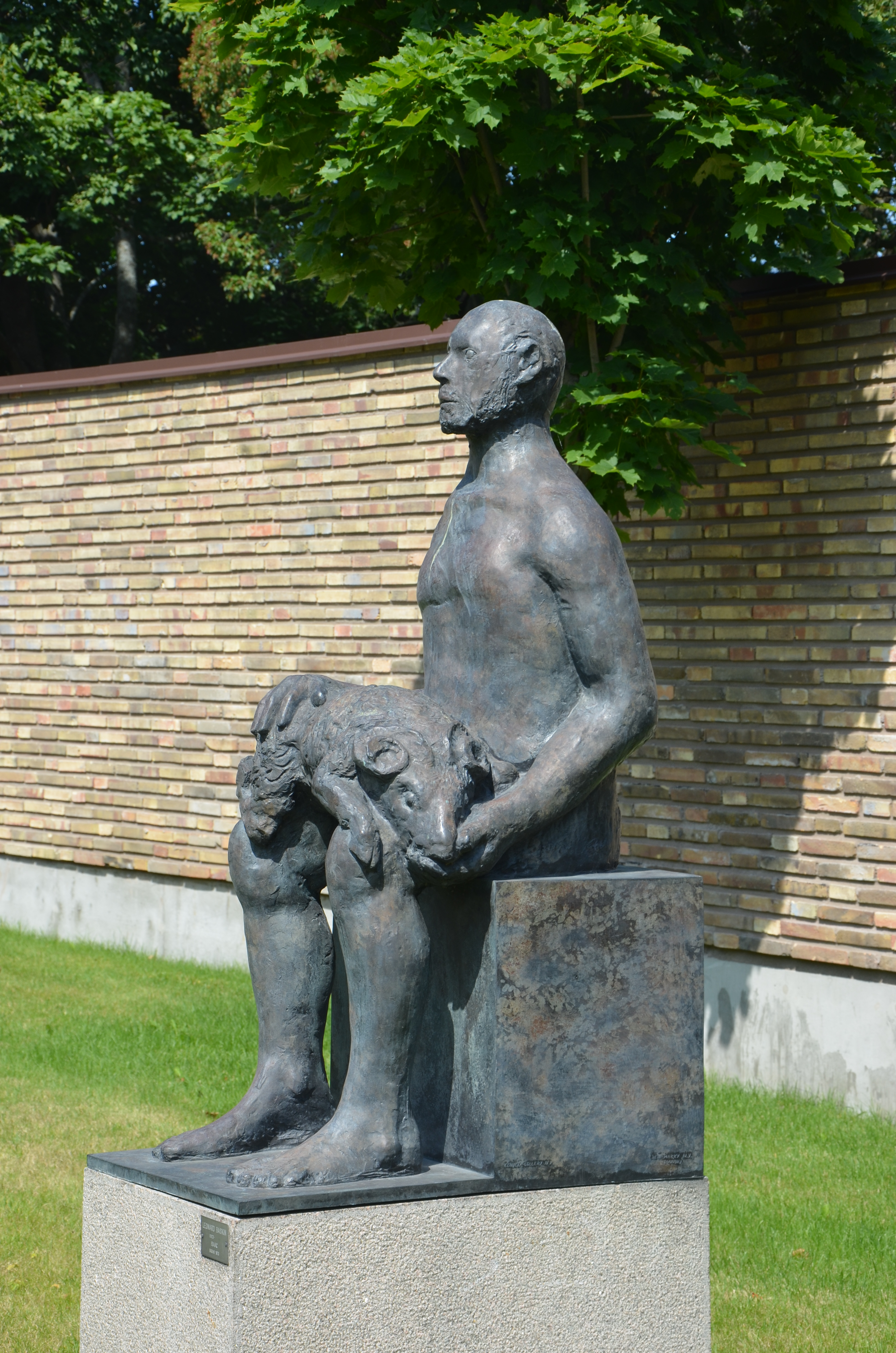
Leonard Baskin (1922–2000) Isak, bronze, 1972, Marabouparken, Sundbyberg, Sweden.

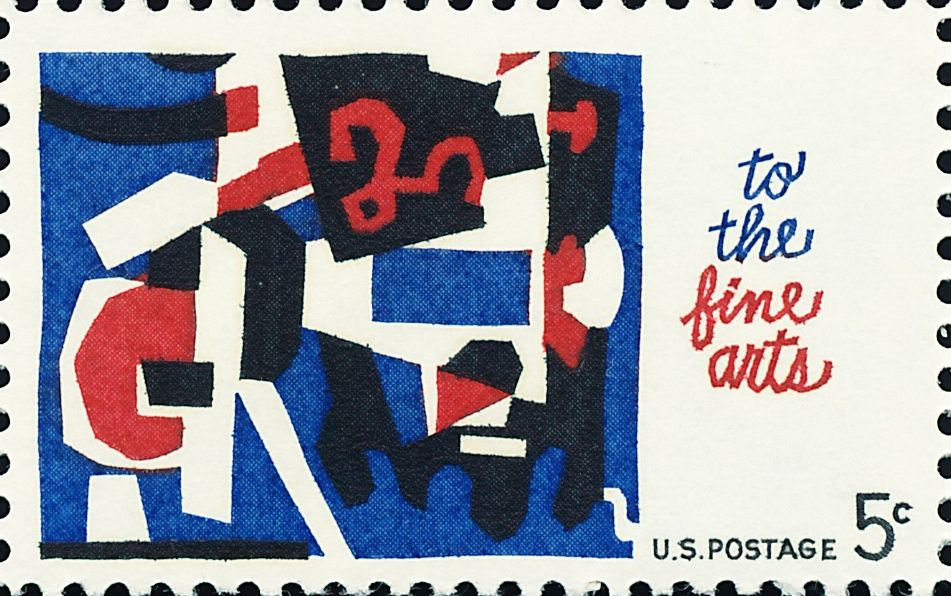
Stuart Davis (1892–1964) U.S. postage stamp, featuring a detailed study of Cliché, 1964.

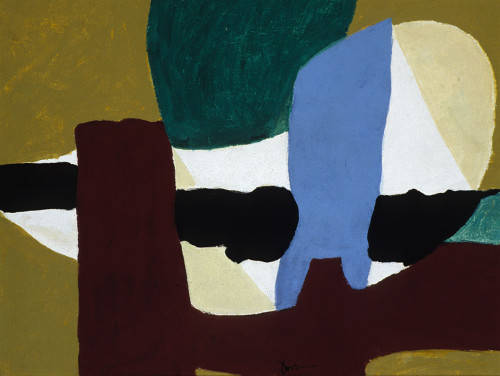
Arthur Garfield Dove (1880–1946) Uprights, Mars Violet and Blue, 1940.

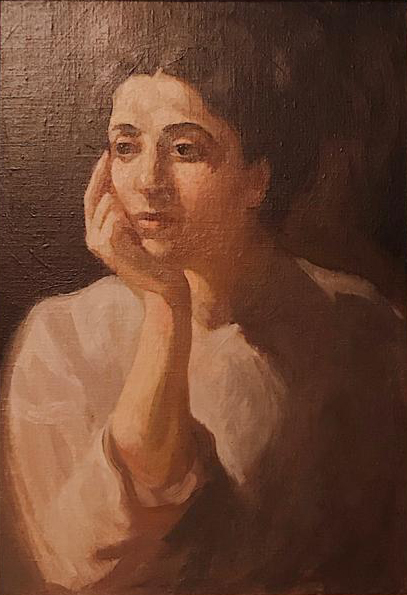
Khalil Gibran (1883–1931) Obra sin título. Oil on canvas, n.d.

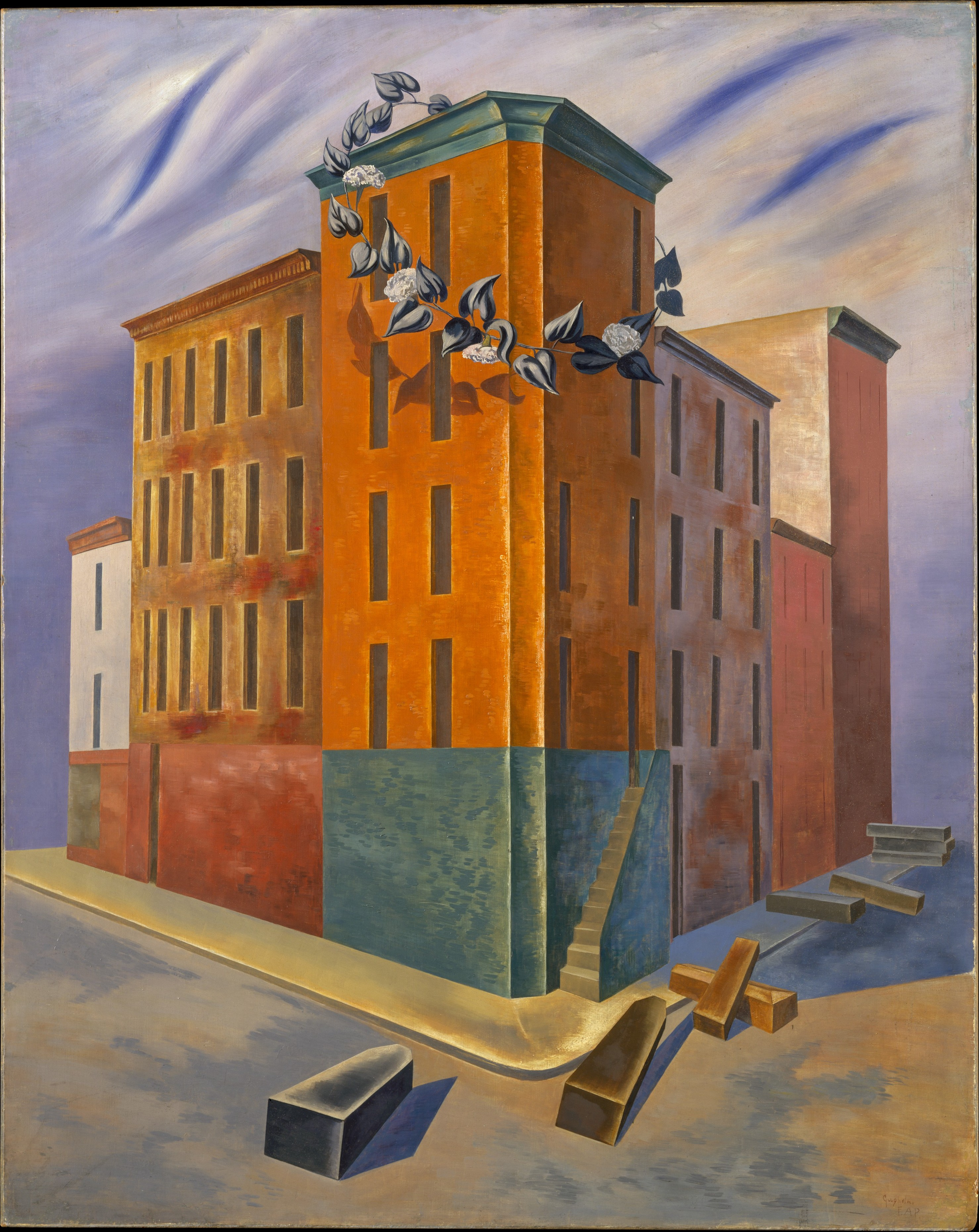
Osvaldo Louis Guglielmi (1906–1956) One Third of a Nation, 1939.

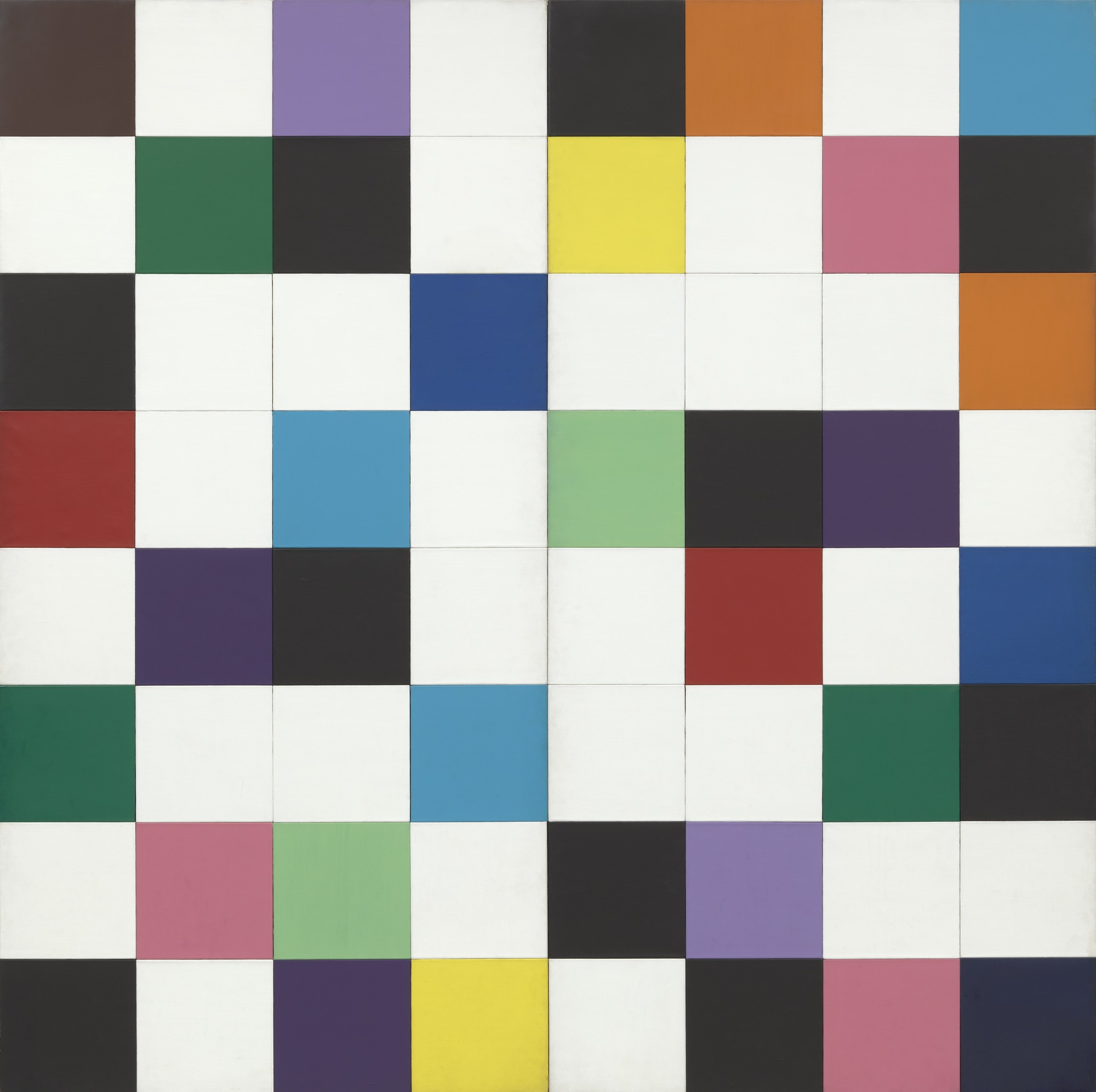
Ellsworth Kelly (1923–2015) Colors for a Large Wall, 1951.

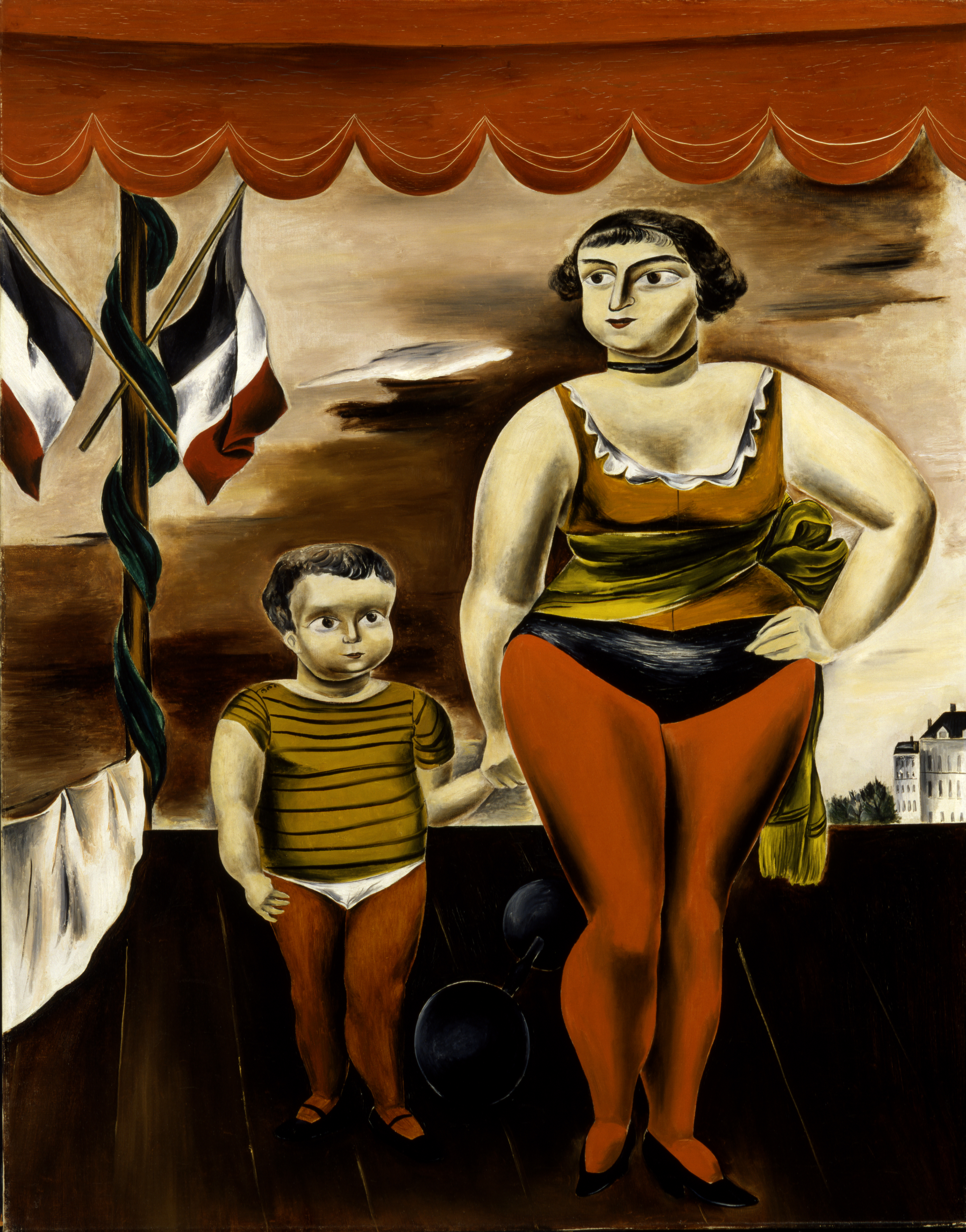
Yasuo Kuniyoshi (1889–1953) Strong Woman and Child, 1925.

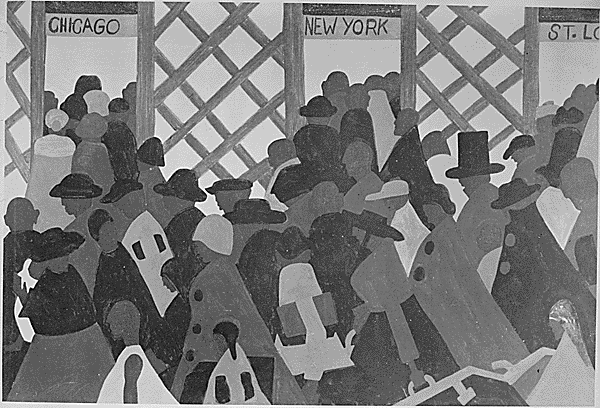
Jacob Lawrence (1917–2000) "During World War I there was a great migration north by southern Negroes." Panel 1 from Migration of the Negro, 1940.

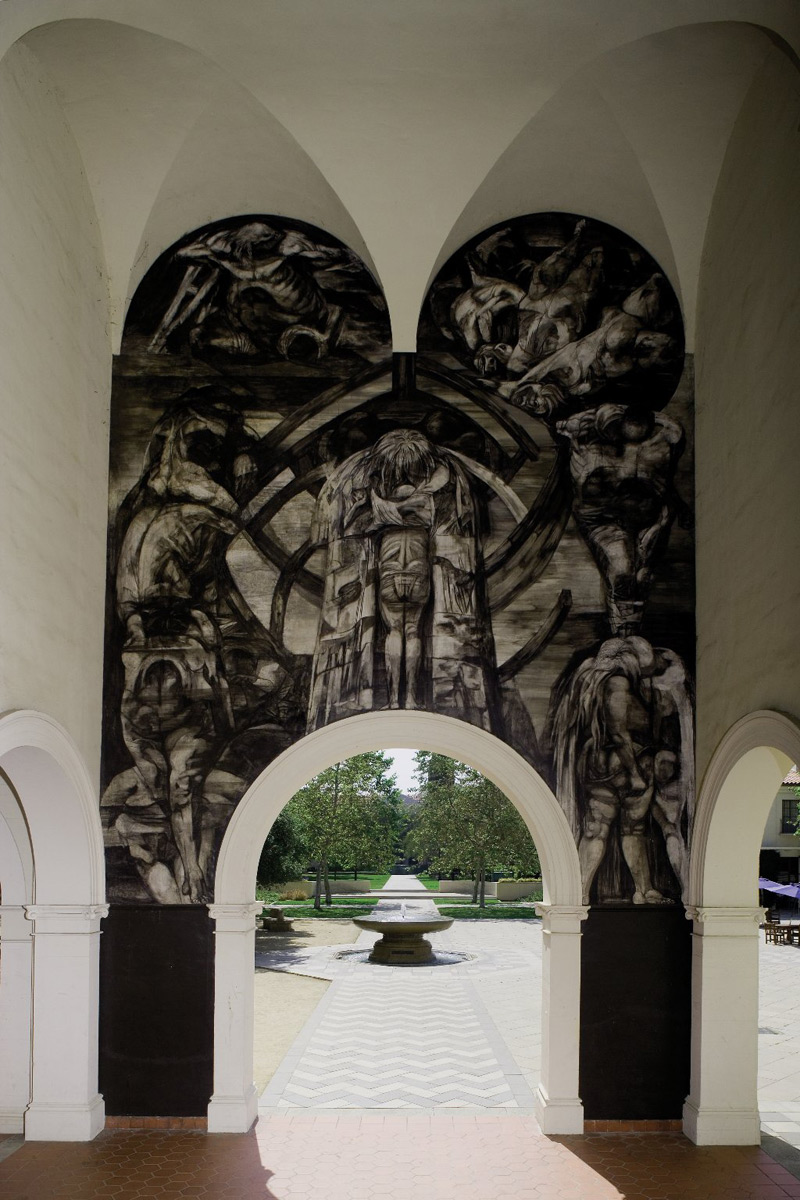
Rico Lebrun (1900–1964) Genesis at Pomona College, 1960.

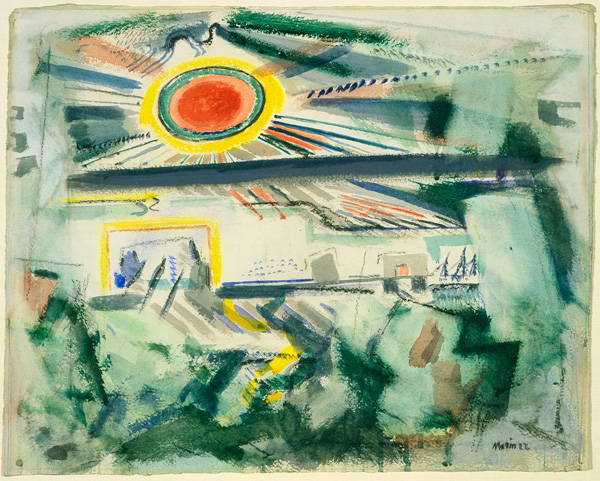
John Marin (1870–1953), Sunset, 1922.

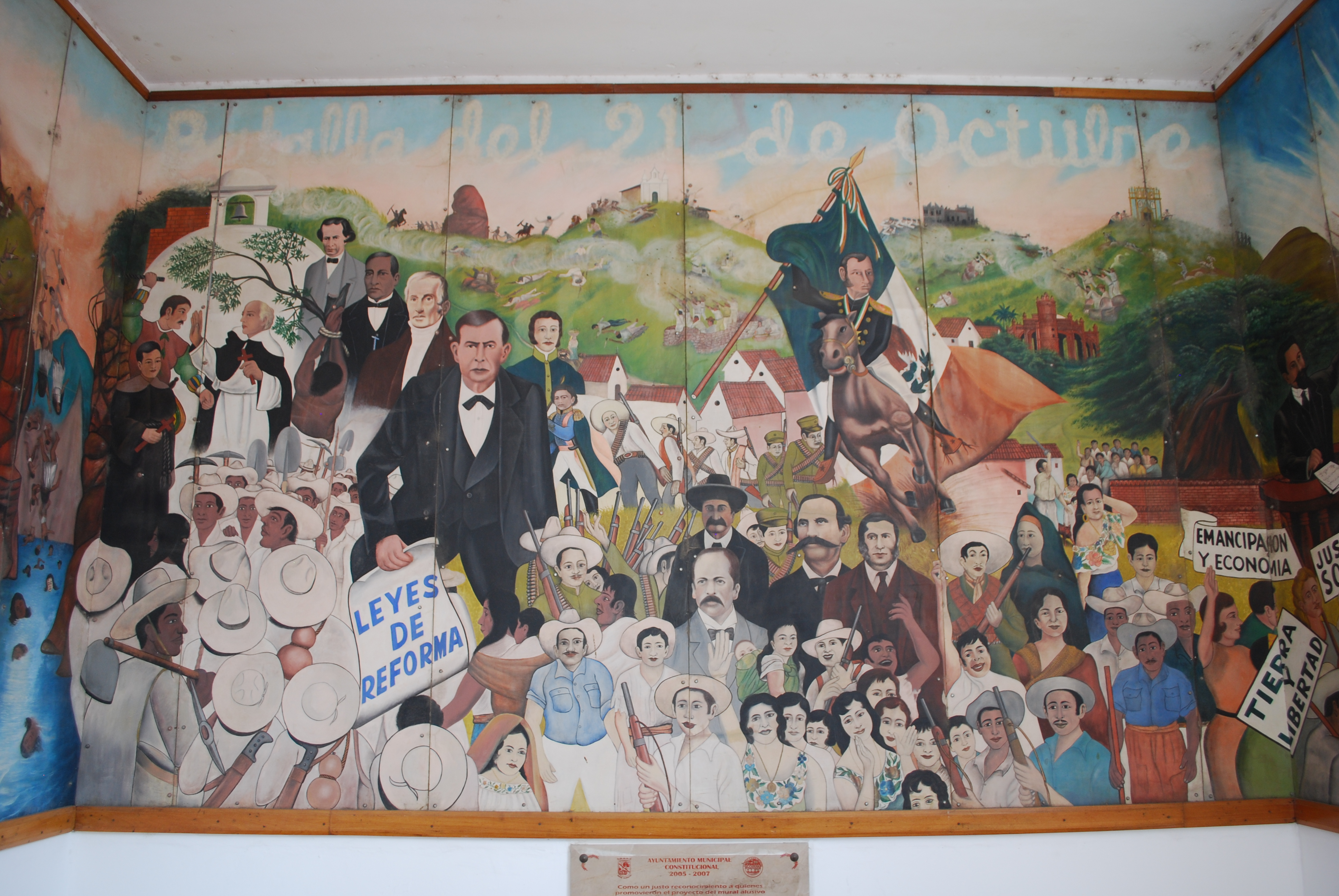
Carlos Mérida (1891–1985) Center part of the mural at the Municipal Palace of Chiapa de Corzo, Chiapas, Mexico.

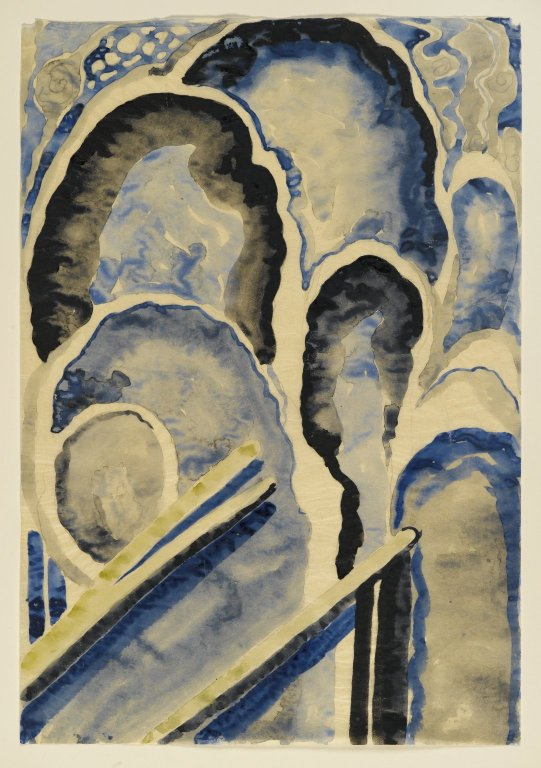
Georgia O'Keeffe, Blue 1, watercolor and graphite on paper, c. 1916.

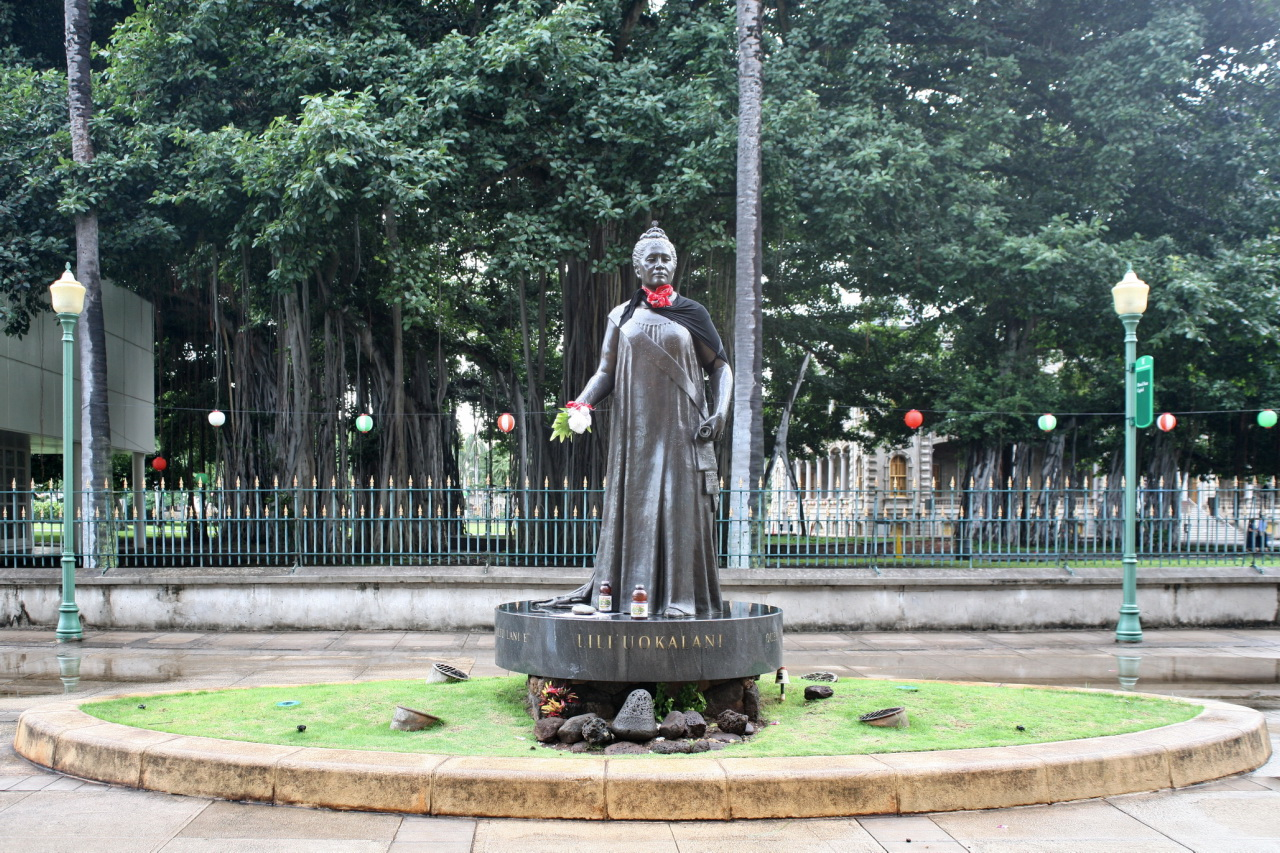
Marianna Pineda (1925–1996) A bronze statue of Hawai'i's Queen Lili'uokalani, 1980, on the State Capitol, south.

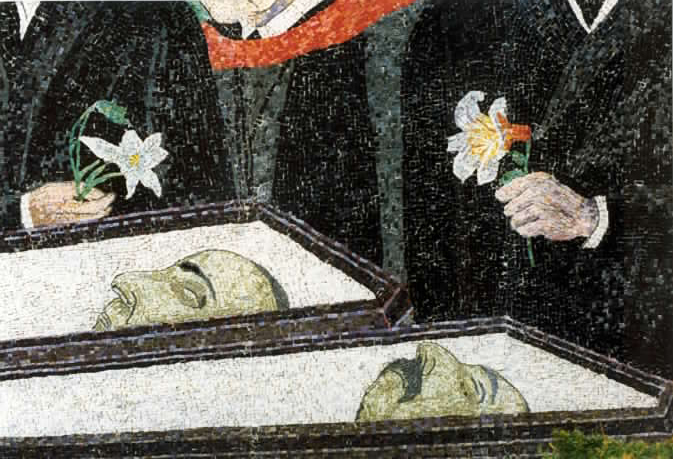
Ben Shahn (1898–1969) The Passion of Sacco & Vanzetti. Oil on canvas, 1931–32.

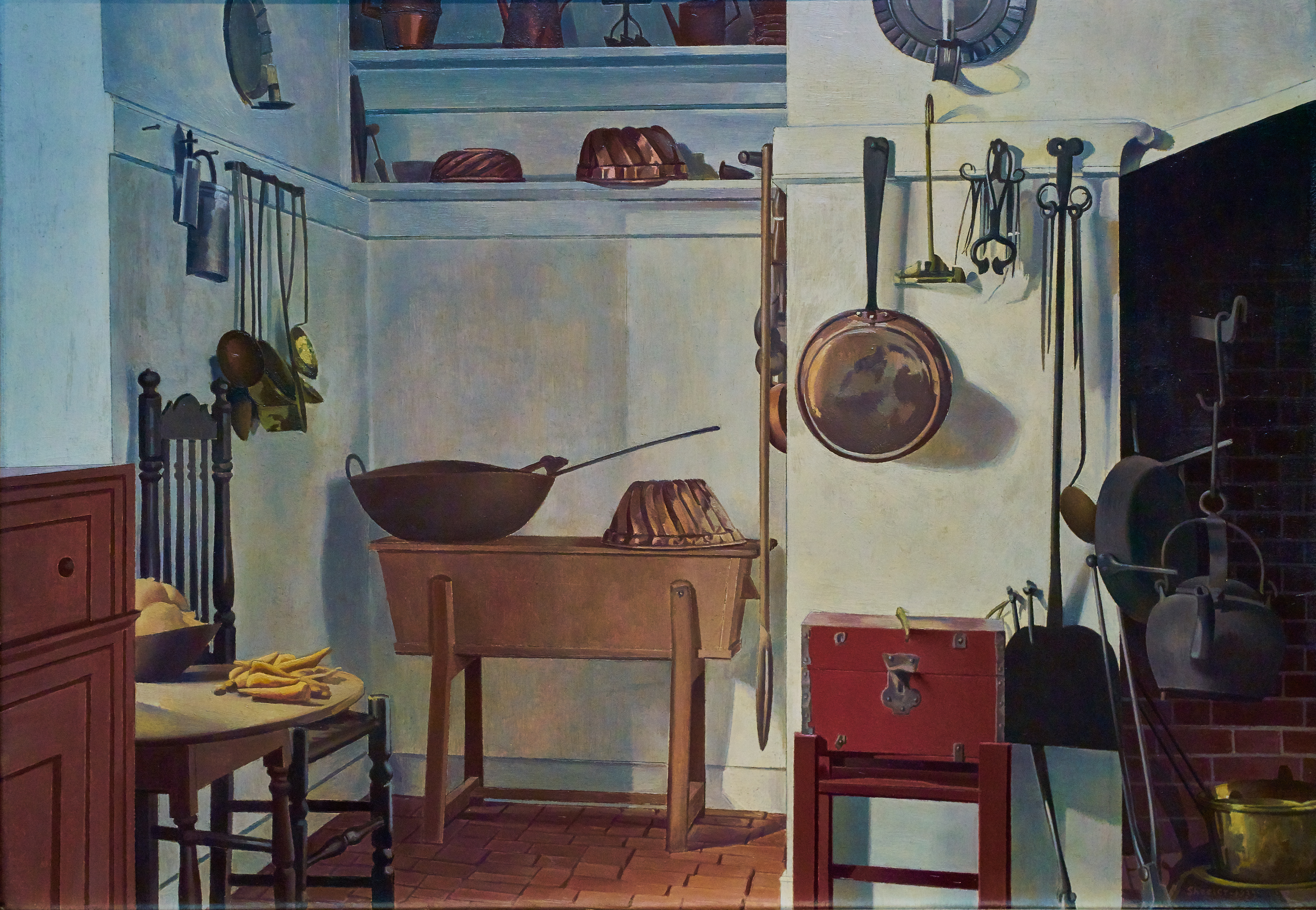
Charles Sheeler (1883–1965) Kitchen, Williamsburg. 1937. Oil on hardboard panel.

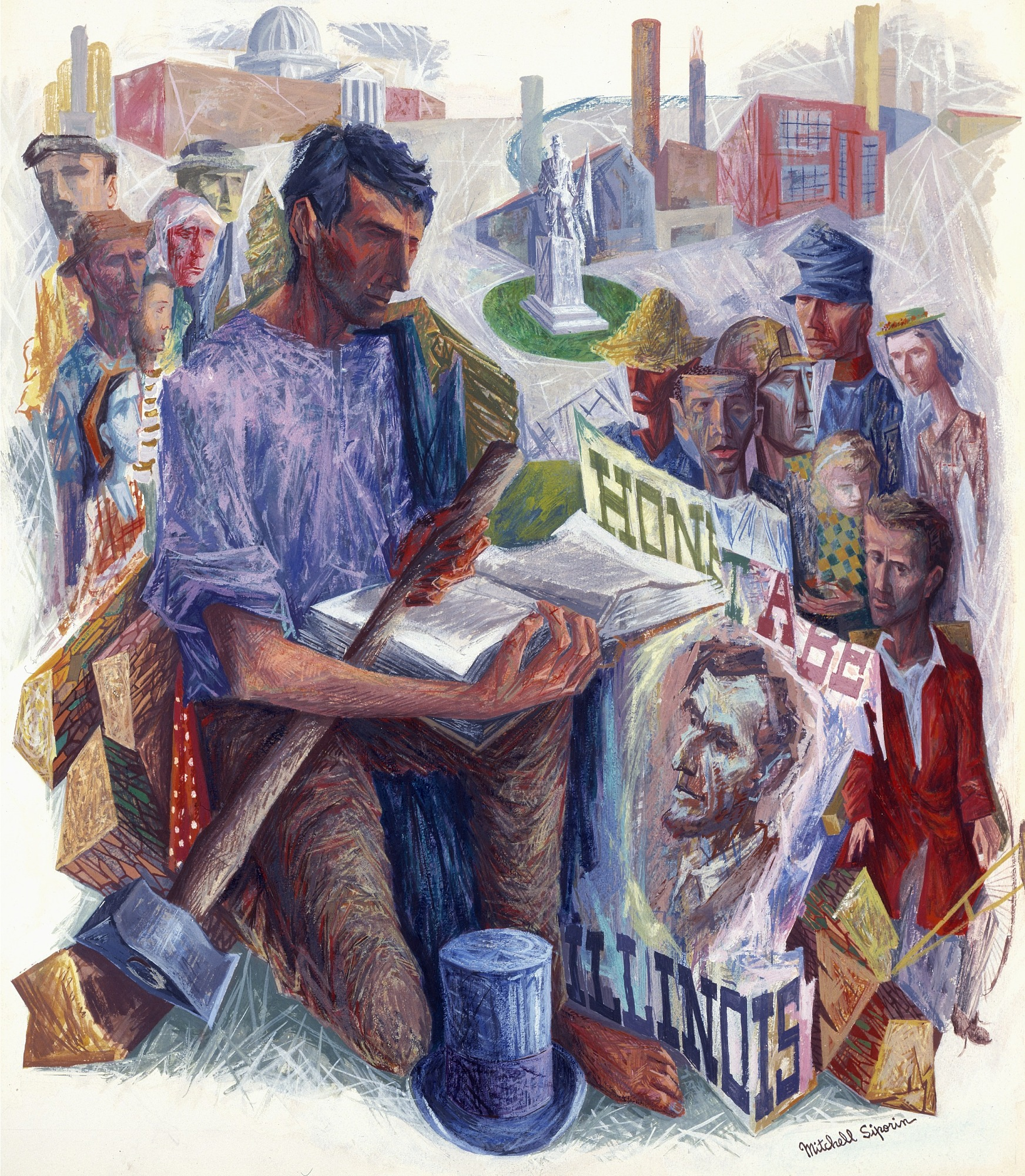
Mitchell Siporin (1910–1976) Illinois: United States Series, 1947.

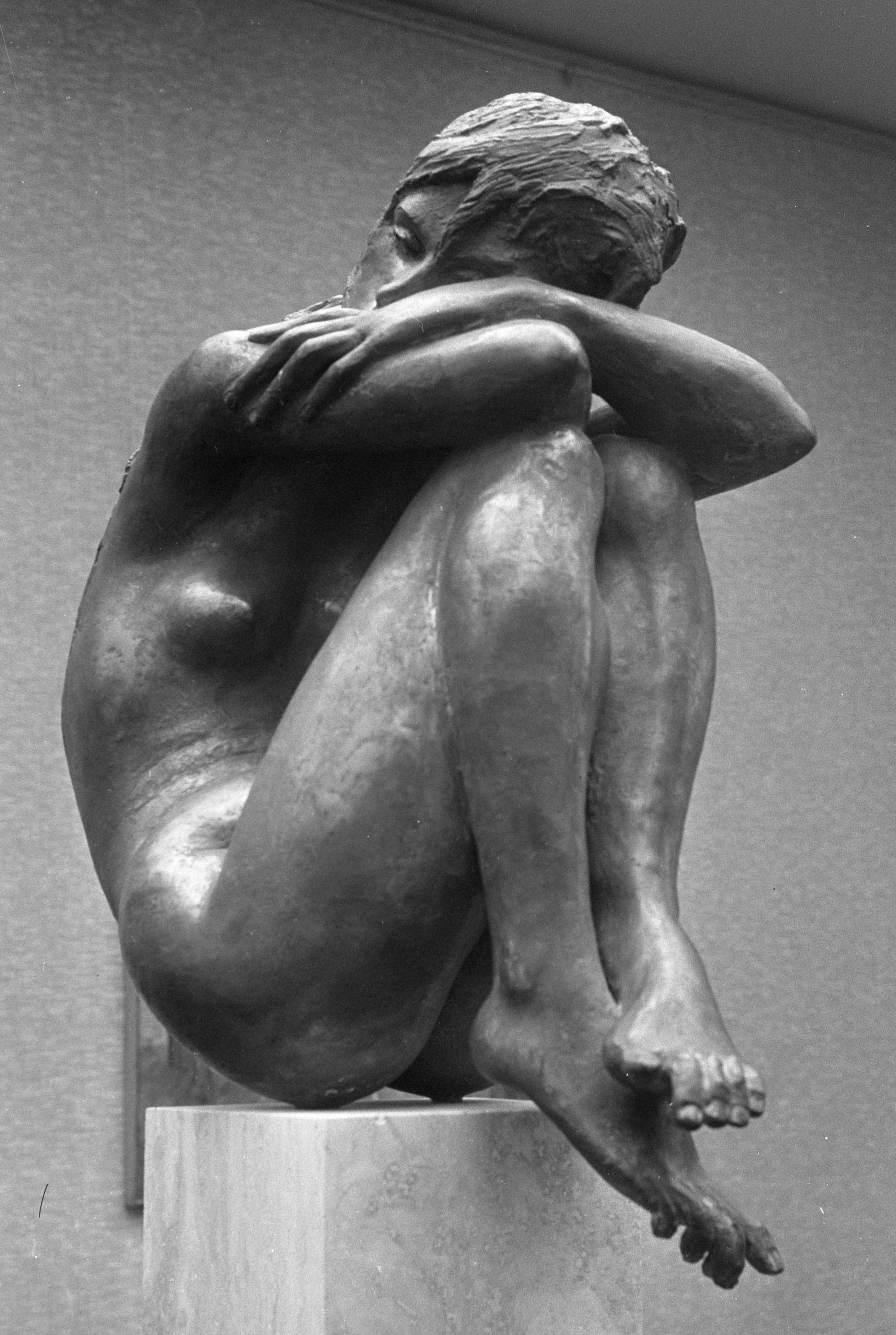
Elbert Weinberg (1928–1991) Sitting Eve, 1968.

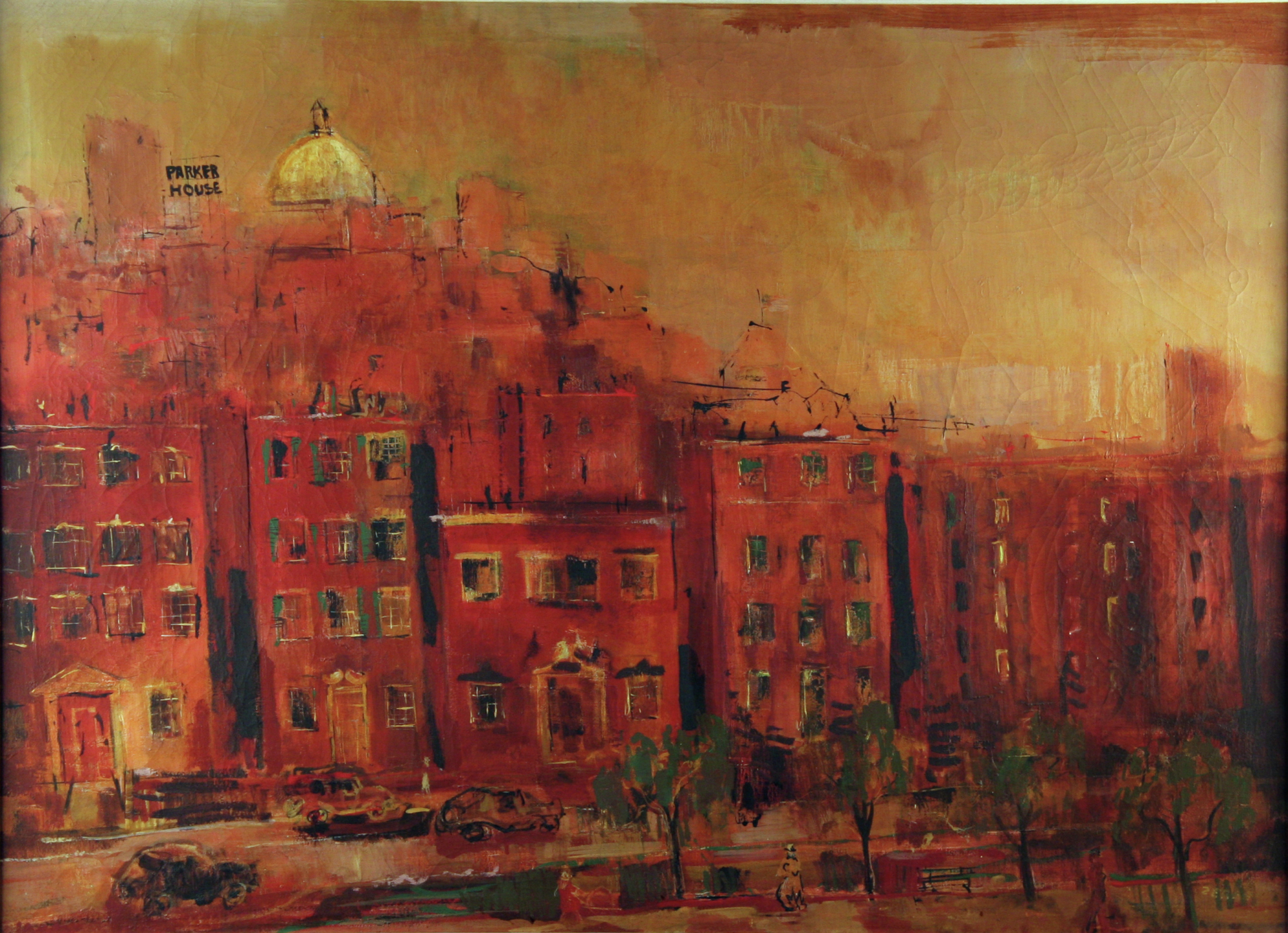
Karl Zerbe (1903–1972) Beacon Hill. Oil on canvas.1943.

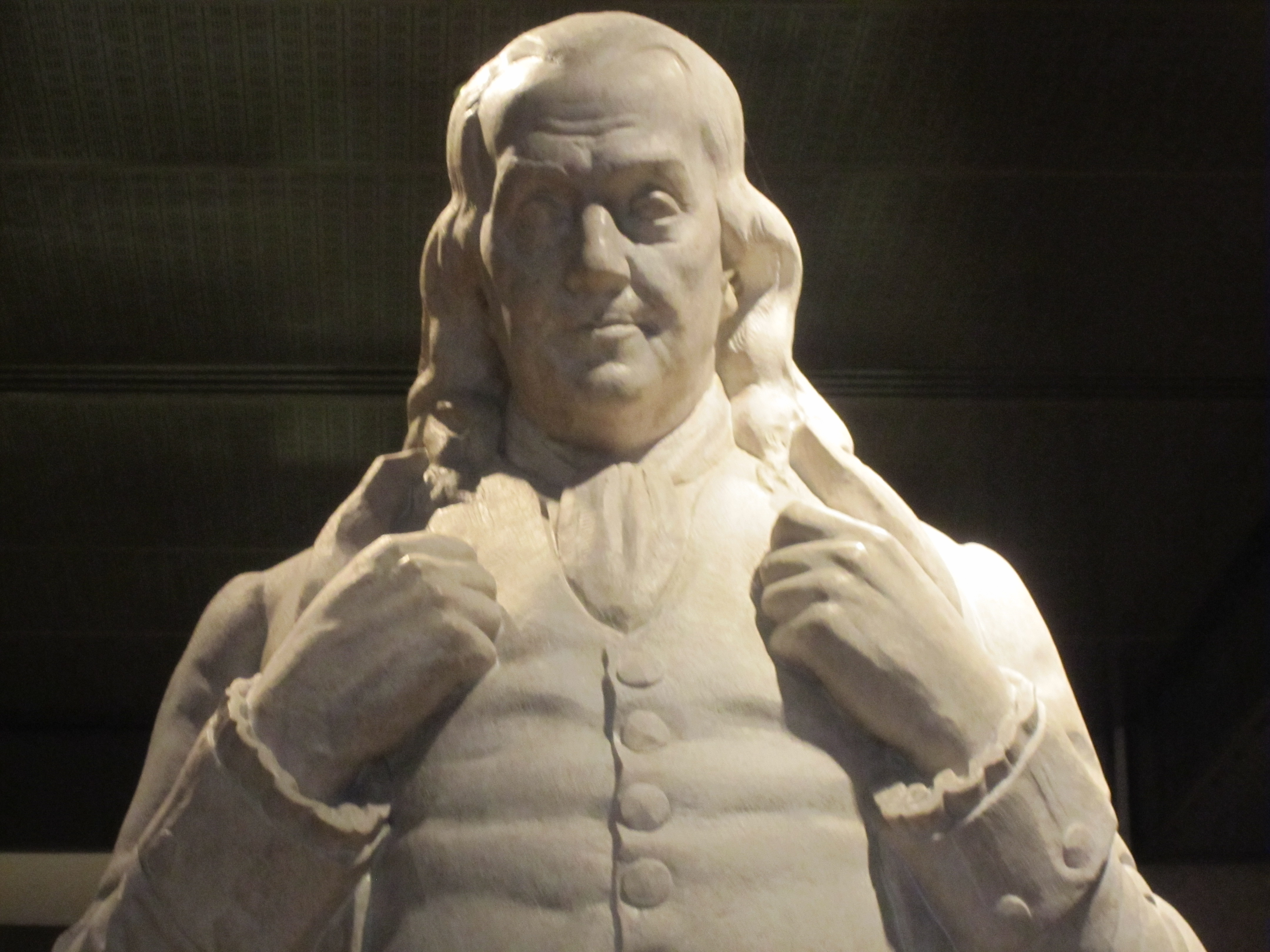
William Zorach (1887–1966), Benjamin Franklin, National Postal Museum, Washington, D.C., 1936.

==== By photo ====
(Selection was limited by availability.)

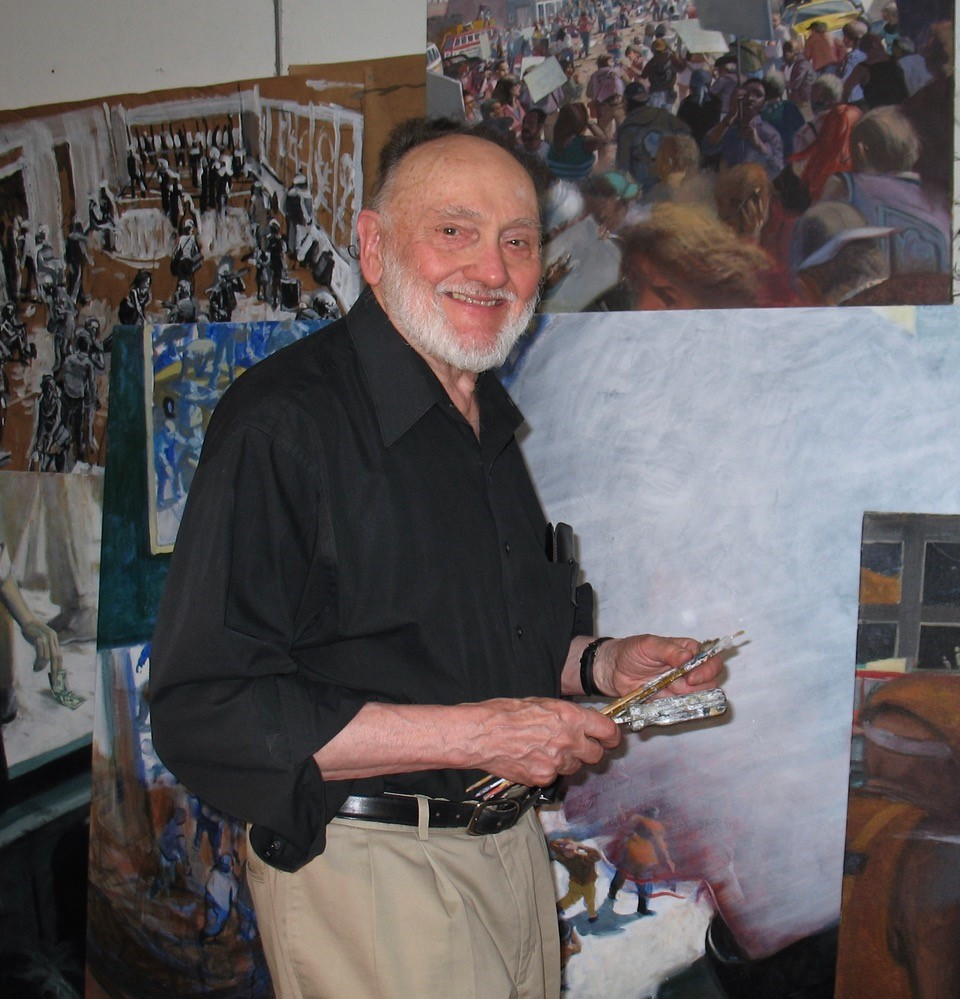
Robert Birmelin in his NYC studio, 2016.

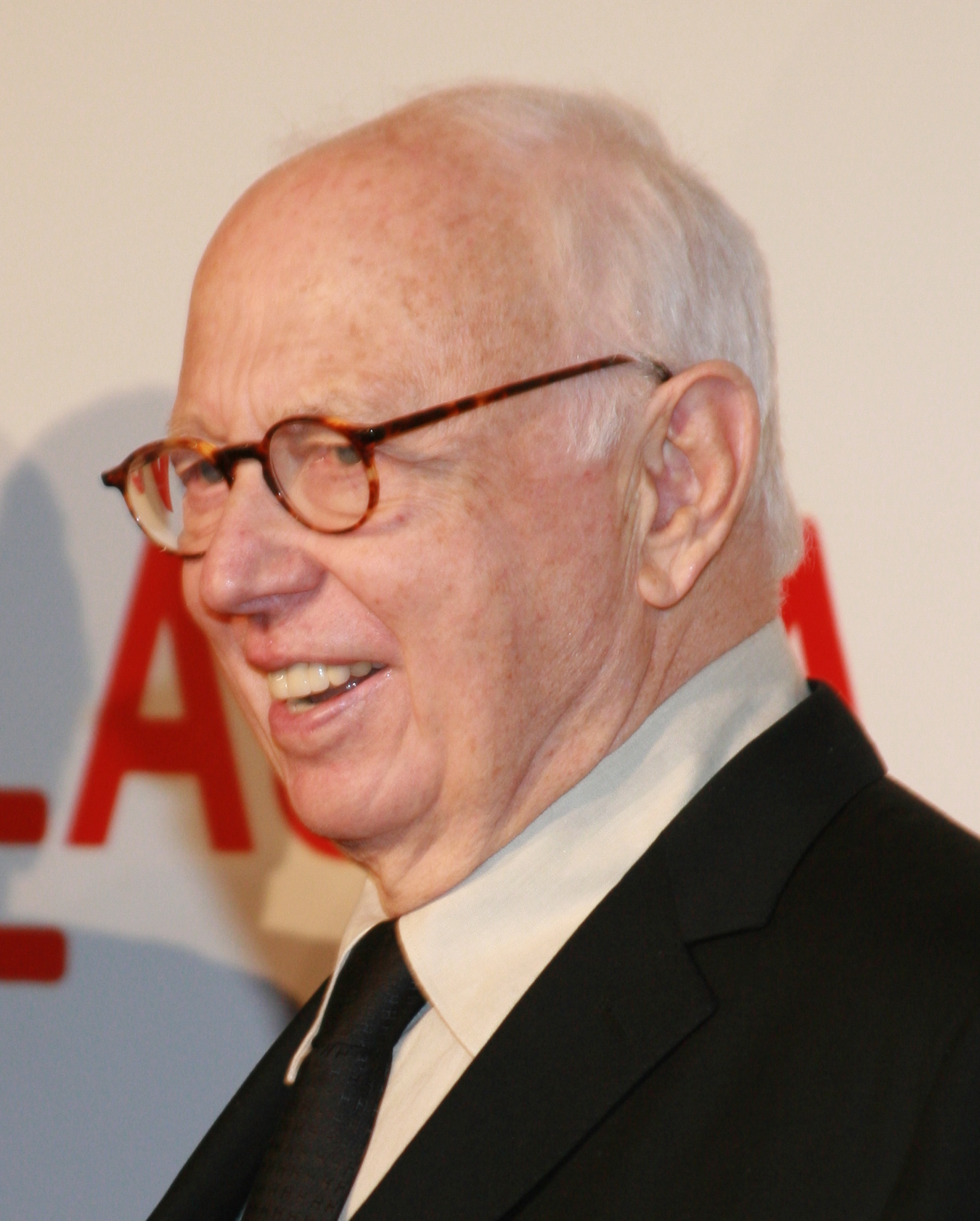
Ellsworth Kelly in Los Angeles in 2008.

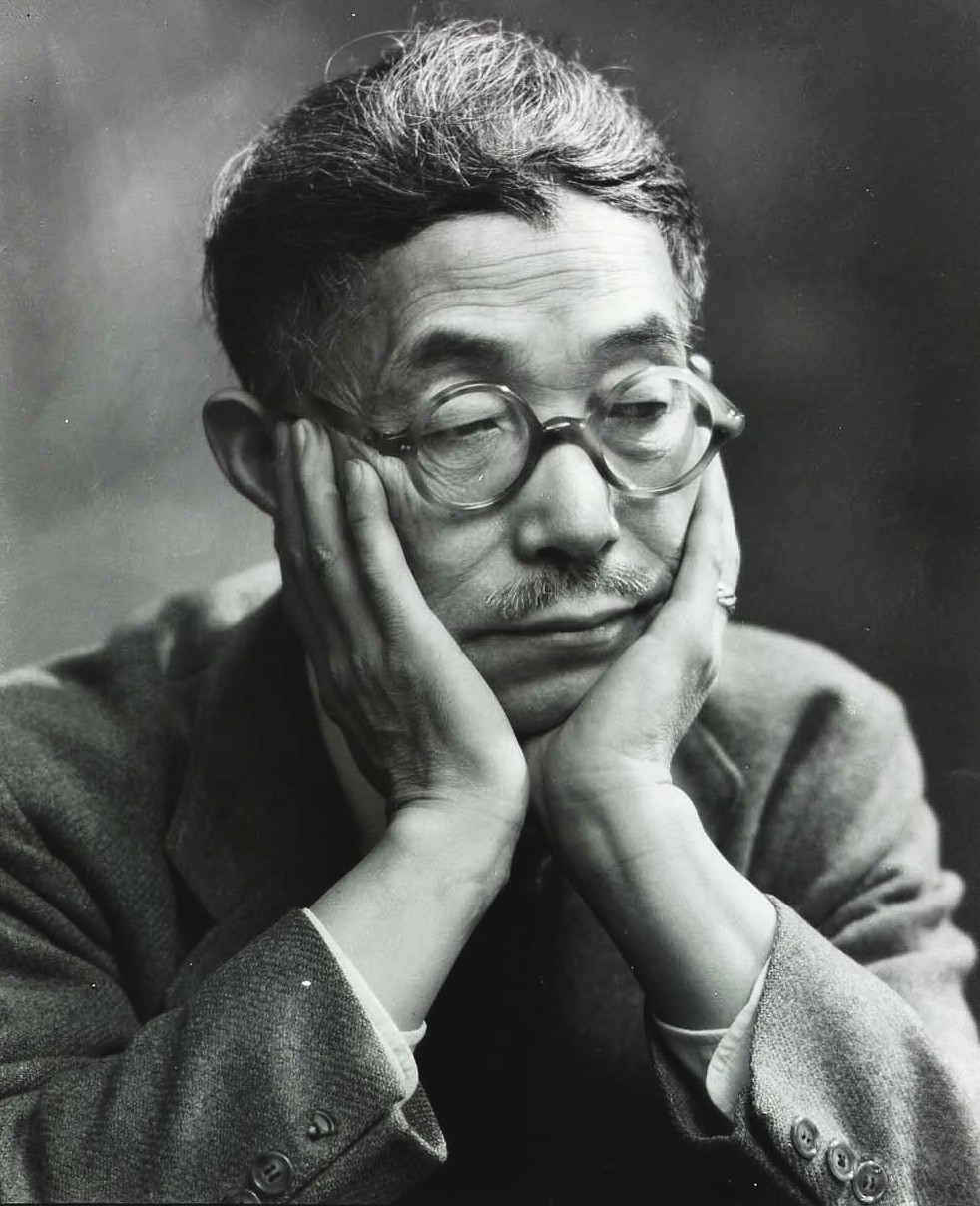
Yasuo Kuniyoshi photographed by Peter A. Juley & Son, n.d.

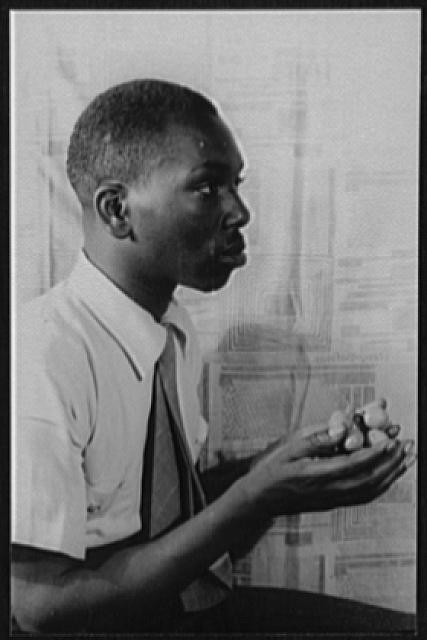
Jacob Lawrence (1917–2000), photographed in 1941.

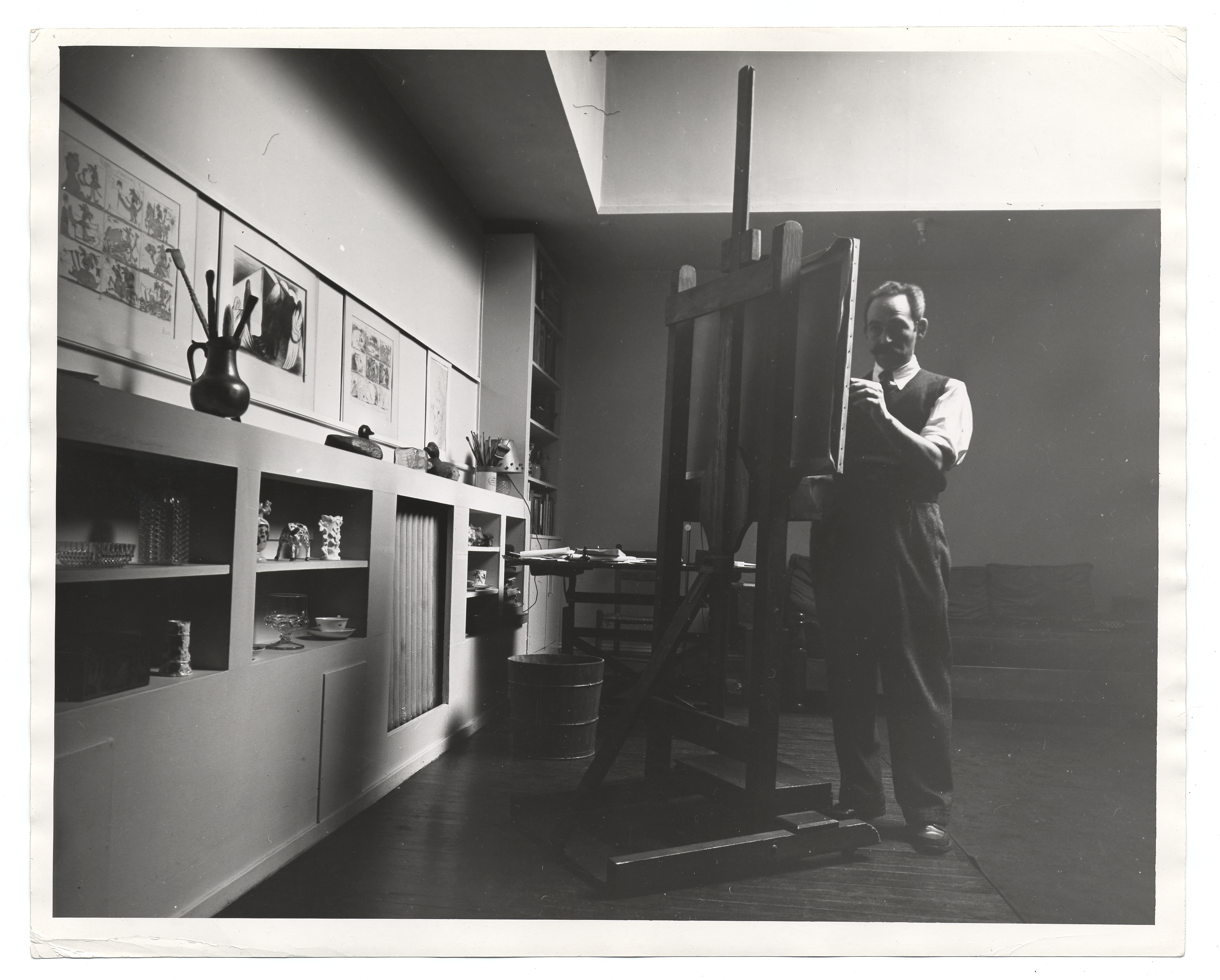
Julian E. Levi photographed by Max Yavno, 1940.

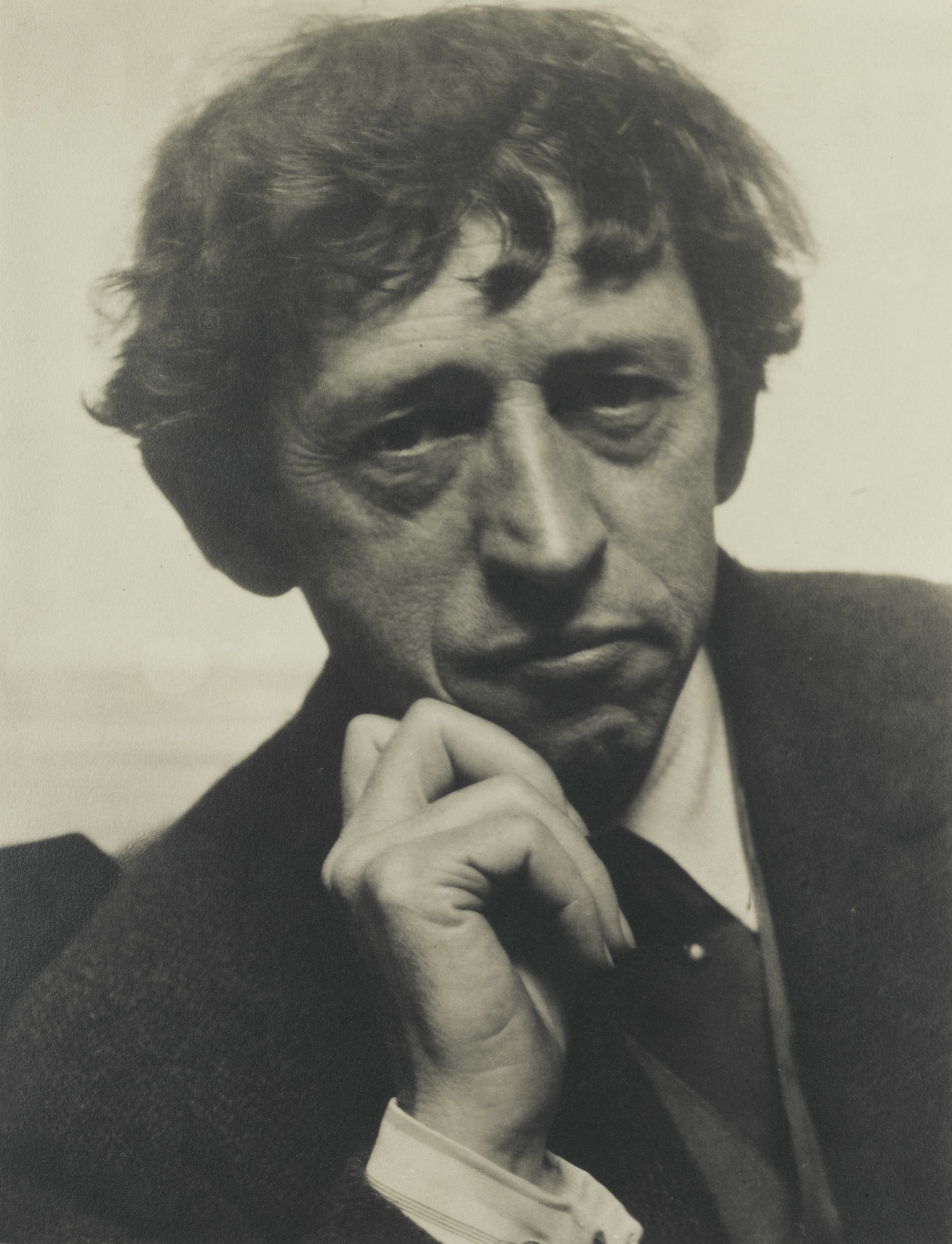
John Marin, photographed by Alfred Stieglitz, 1922.

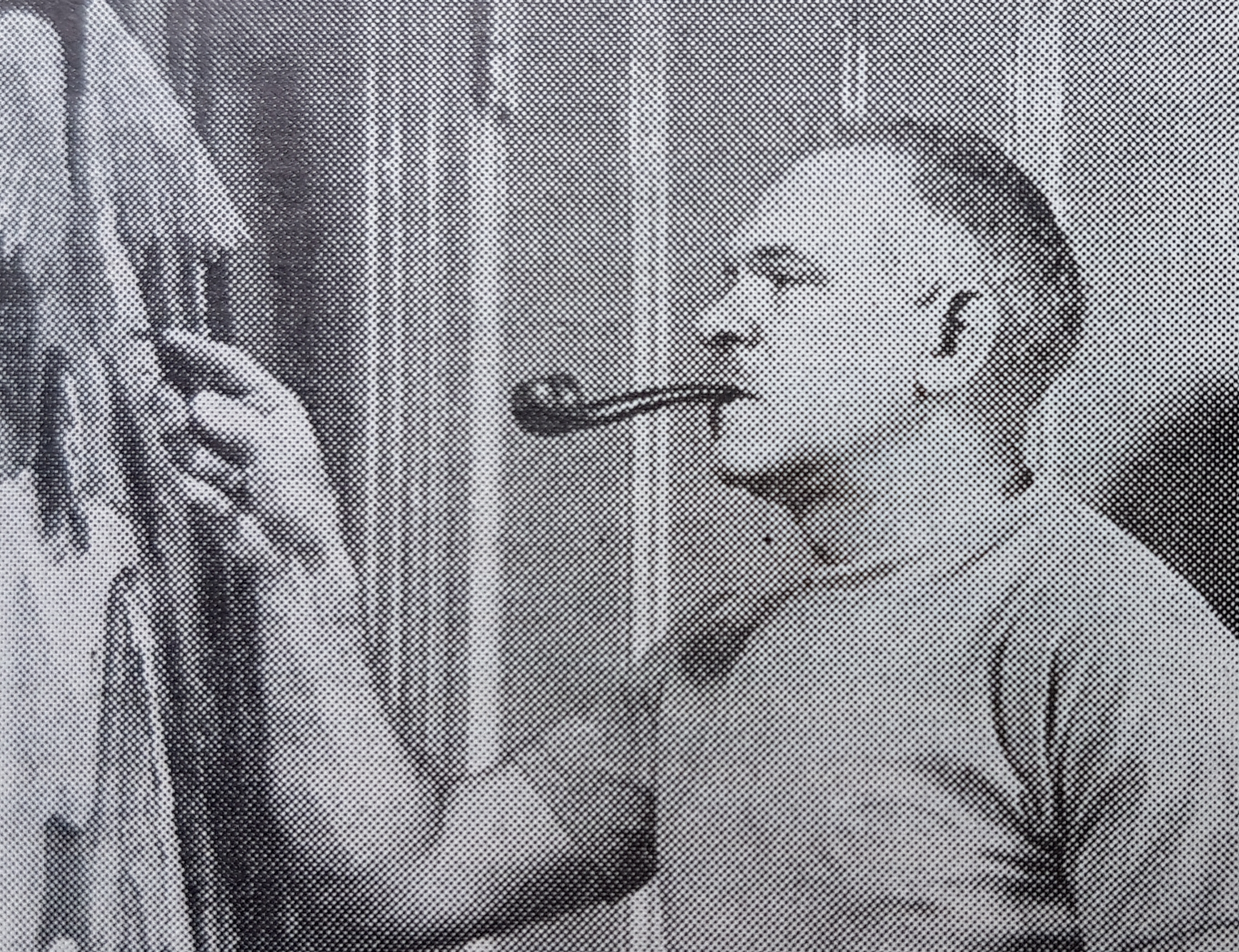
Carl Gustaf Nelson in Sweden in 1920.

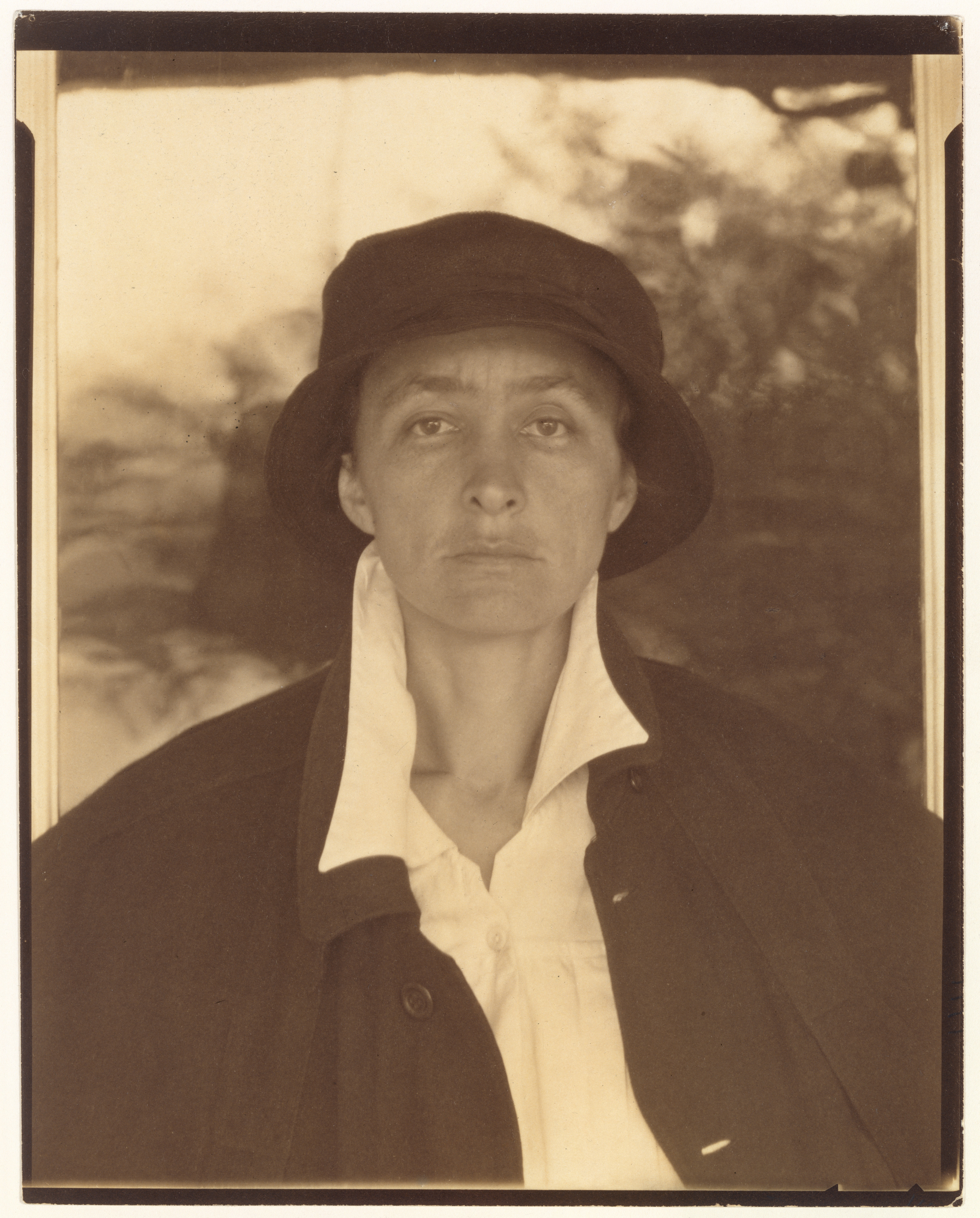
Georgia O'Keeffe (1887–1986) photographed by Alfred Steiglitz, 1921.

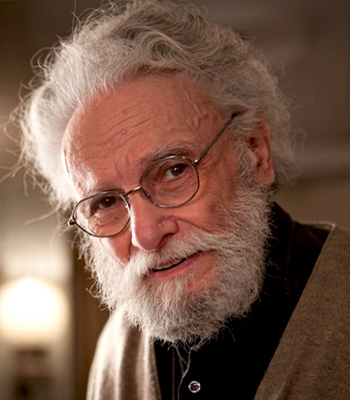
Arthur Polonsky in 2013.

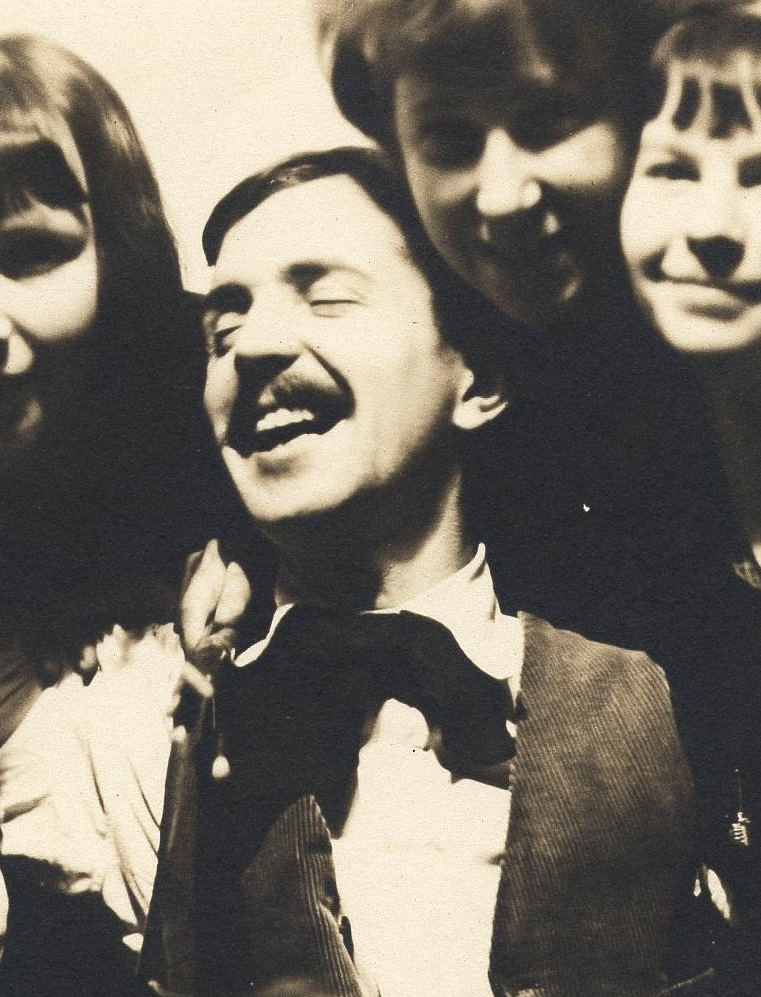
Niles Spencer by Yasuo Kuniyoshi, c. 1921.

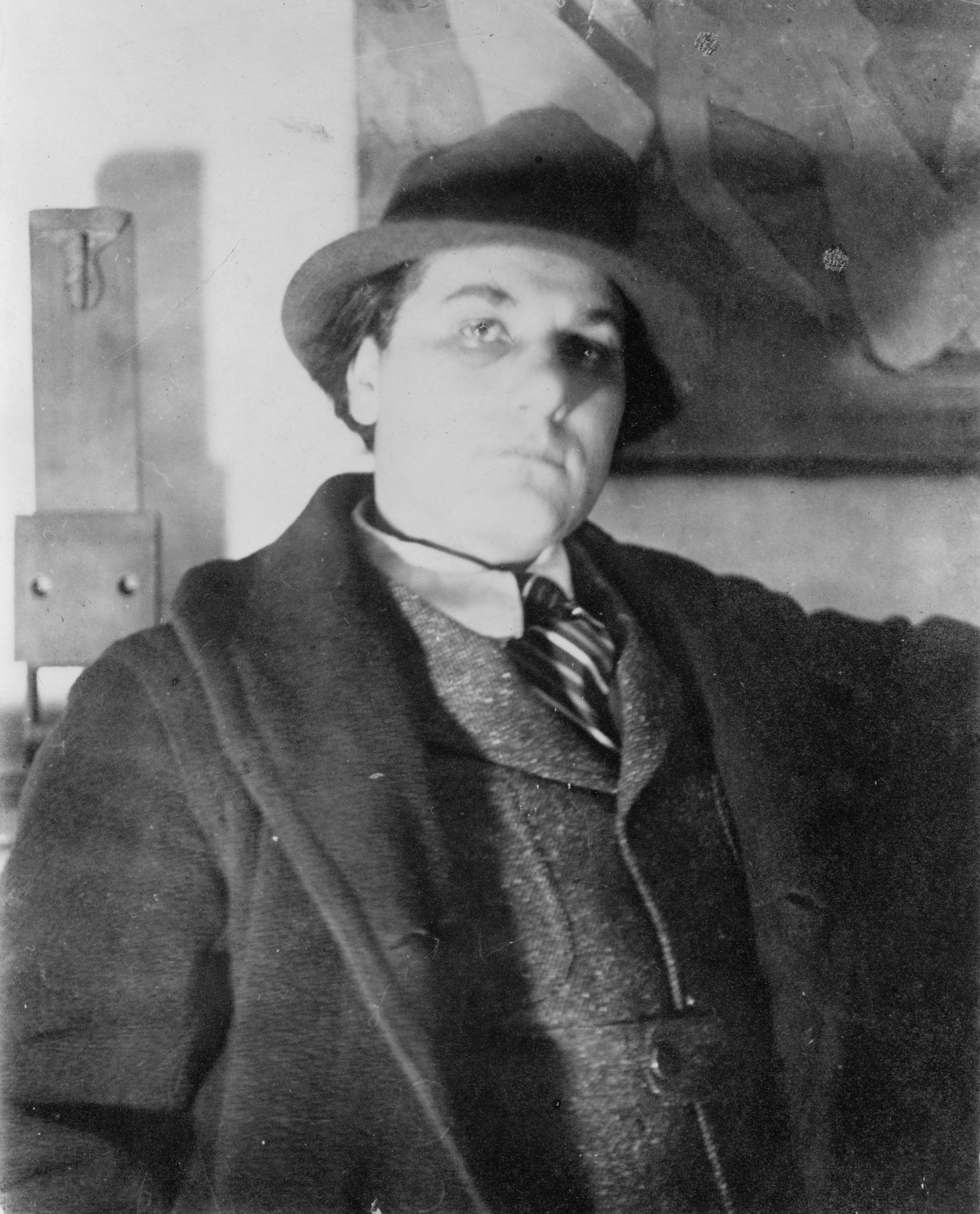
William Zorach (1889–1966) photographed by Man Ray, 1917.

== Legacy ==
=== American art ===
Boris Mirski's family donated the records of the Boris Mirski Gallery (1944–1979) in stages, between 1989 and 2017 to the Archives of American Art. Several key figures in Boston Expressionism, with links to Mirski, have also given oral history interviews to the Archives, including Hyman Bloom, David Aronson, Jack Levine, Marianna Pineda, Arthur Polonsky, Karl Zerbe and Ralph Coburn.

=== Related galleries ===
On and off, Mirski employed both of the Swetzoff brothers: Seymour and Hyman. Hyman, however, had also worked at the nearby Institute of Modern Art, and he ultimately served as Mirski's Gallery director. In 1948, he and his brother decided to open a gallery of their own. Their gallery began as the Frameshop Gallery on Huntington Avenue, but Hyman became director in 1953, and moved it to Newbury Street, renaming it the Swetzoff Gallery (1948–1968) in the process. The gallery closed in 1968 when Hyman died.

Alan Fink served as Mirski's gallery director for 16 years. A "founding member of the Boston Art Dealers association", he founded the Alpha Gallery (1967–present), also on Newbury Street, along the Mirski model in 1967. Already married to painter Barbara Swan, a former Mirski artist, Fink began by representing "Swan's work and later that of their son Aaron, a figurative expressionist painter, [t]heir daughter, Joanna, ran the gallery for many years." The gallery, which continues to operate, eventually relocated to the South End of Boston.

== See also ==
- Edith Halpert
- Art dealer
- Art gallery
- Modern art
- Art movement
- 20th–century art
- American Figurative Expressionism
- Boston Expressionism

== Bibliography ==
- Bookbinder, Judith (2005). Boston Modern: Figurative Expressionism as Alternative Modernism. University of New Hampshire Press. ISBN 1-58465-488-0.
- Chaet, Bernard (1980). "The Boston Expressionist School: A Painter's Recollection of the Forties". Archives of American Art Journal. 20 (1): 25–30. doi:10.1086/aaa.20.1.1557495. JSTOR 1557495. S2CID 192821072.
- DeCordova Museum (2002). Painting in Boston, 1950-2000. University of Massachusetts Press. ISBN 9781558493643.
- Gibran, Jean; Giuliano, Charles; French, Katherine (2014). Love Made Visible: Scenes from a Mostly Happy Marriage. Interlink. ISBN 9781566569781.
- Giuliano, Charles (2017). Boston Art Dealer Alan Fink is Dead: Art Was the Family Business. Retrieved October 26, 2020.
- McQuaid, Cate (September 18, 2002). "Despite Gaps, Exhibit Shows Boston's Vigor in the 40s". The Boston Globe. Archived from the original on December 7, 2017.
- Taylor, Robert (July 30, 1974). "Boris Mirski, Dean of Newbury St. Art Dealers, Dies". The Boston Globe. Archived from the original on December 7, 2017.
- Temin, Christine (May 6, 1982). "The Art of Running a Boston Gallery". The Boston Globe. ProQuest 294239122.
- Tonelli, Edith (1980). "The Avant-Garde in Boston: The Experiment of the WPA Federal Art Project". Archives of American Art Journal. 20 (1): 18–24. doi:10.1086/aaa.20.1.1557494. JSTOR 1557494. S2CID 193323551.
- "Boris Mirski gallery records, 1944-1979". Archives of American Art.
- "Art: Boston Surprise". Time. October 15, 1945.
