= Paul Englund =

American biochemist (1938–2019)

Paul Theodore Englund
- Born: March 25, 1938; Worcester, Massachusetts, U.S.
- Died: January 12, 2019 (aged 80); Baltimore, Maryland, U.S.
- Education: Hamilton College (BS); Rockefeller University (PhD)
- Known for: Gene-based research of parasites, particularly related to African trypanosomiasis (sleeping sickness)
- Spouse: Christine Schneyer Englund
- Awards: Elected to the National Academy of Sciences, 2012; the Paul and Christine Englund Professorship at Johns Hopkins was established by an anonymous philanthropist in his name
- Scientific career
- Fields: Biochemistry and molecular biology of parasitic protozoa
- Institutions: Johns Hopkins School of Medicine, International Laboratory for Research on Animal Diseases in Kenya and the Marine Biological Laboratory in Woods Hole, Massachusetts
- Academic advisors: Lyman C. Craig; Arthur Kornberg

Paul Theodore Englund (March 25, 1938 – January 12, 2019) was an American biochemist known for his work with parasites, and especially his research into the genetic material in the parasitic organisms that cause African trypanosomiasis, more commonly called sleeping sickness.

== Early life and education ==
Born in Worcester, Massachusetts, to Theodore, a mechanical engineer father, and Mildred, a homemaker mother, Englund grew up alongside brother Donald, a teacher and Robert, a doctor, as well as his cousin, the artist Joyce Reopel. He went on to study chemistry at Hamilton College, graduating in 1960; he then earned his doctorate in biochemistry at Rockefeller University, graduating in 1966. At the latter school, he studied with Nobel nominee Lyman C. Craig.

== Career ==
He received funding from the National Institutes of Health for his postdoctoral fellowship at the Stanford University School of Medicine where he studied with Nobel laureate Arthur Kornberg. Englund was later recruited to join the Johns Hopkins School of Medicine faculty, where he stayed for more than 40 years until retiring as professor emeritus. In addition to his work there, he also taught a class in the biology of parasitism at the famed Marine Biological Laboratory in Woods Hole, Massachusetts, and held a position as a visiting scientist at the International Laboratory for Research on Animal Diseases in Kenya. In 2012, Englund was elected to the National Academy of Sciences. In 2016, an anonymous donor established the Paul and Christine Englund Professorship at the Johns Hopkins School of Medicine in the Englunds' honor.

A prolific researcher, Englund published more than 190 scholarly articles, and his work has been cited more than 10,000 times. He is best known for his work with African trypanosomiasis, a potentially fatal disease that infects both human and animals, which is spread by the tse-tse fly in sub-Saharan Africa. Englund's focus was on researching the structure and function of the genetic material in trypanosomes, the parasites that also lend their name to the disease. As the Johns Hopkins School of Medicine explained in their obituary:

One focus of his research was GPI anchors. Composed mainly of sugars and fats, GPIs hold proteins to cell surfaces in all animals and are especially abundant in trypanosomes. In searching for the source of GPIs, he discovered a unique way that fatty acids are made in trypanosomes that is not found in other organisms. During his research career, Englund authored nearly 190 journal articles.

== Personal life ==
Englund died of Parkinson's disease on January 12, 2019.

== Awards and memberships ==
- Member of the National Academy of Sciences (elected 2012)
- Member of the American Society for Biochemistry and Molecular Biology
- Member of the American Association for the Advancement of Science
