= Archives of American Art =

Collection of visual arts resources in the US

- Location of the Archives of American Art in Washington, D.C. Archives of American Art (the United States)
- Established: 1954
- Location: 750 9th Street NW, Victor Building, Suite 2200, Washington, D.C.; 300 Park Avenue S, Suite 300, New York City, New York
- Coordinates: 38.897851°N 77.022689°W
- Type: Archives
- Visitors: 1,498 (2009)
- Director: Anne Helmreich (2023)
- Public transit access: Washington, D.C., location: Gallery Place–Chinatown
- Website: www.aaa.si.edu

The Archives of American Art is the largest collection of primary resources documenting the history of the visual arts in the United States. More than 20 million items of original material are housed in the Archives' research centers in Washington, D.C., and New York City.

As a research center within the Smithsonian Institution, the Archives houses materials related to a variety of American visual art and artists. All regions of the country and numerous eras and art movements are represented. Among the significant artists represented in its collection are Jackson Pollock, Lee Krasner, Marcel Breuer, Rockwell Kent, John Singer Sargent, Winslow Homer, John Trumbull, and Alexander Calder. In addition to the papers of artists, the Archives collects documentary material from art galleries, art dealers, and art collectors. It also houses a collection of over 2,000 art-related oral history interviews, and publishes a bi-yearly publication, the Archives of American Art Journal, which showcases collections within the Archives.

== History ==
The Archives of American Art was founded in Detroit in 1954 by then Director of the Detroit Institute of Arts, Edgar Preston Richardson, and art collector Lawrence A. Fleischman. The first archivist was Arline Custer, the librarian of the Detroit Institute of Arts Research Library. Concerned about the lack of material relating to American art, Richardson and Fleischman organized the Archives of American Art with the support of scholars and businessmen. Their intention was to collect materials related to American artists, art dealers, institutions and writers, and to allow scholars and writers to access the holdings. In 1970 the Archives became part of the Smithsonian Institution, moving its processing center and storage facility from Detroit to the Old Patent Office Building in Washington, D.C.

Currently, the collection and offices are located at the Victor Building, on 9th Street NW, only a few blocks away from the Old Patent Office Building. Every year the Archives honors individual contributions to the American art community with the Archives of American Art Medal and art historians with the Lawrence A. Fleischman Award for Scholarly Excellence in the Field of American Art History. These awards are presented at the Archives' annual benefit and have been rewarded to Mark di Suvero, Chuck Close, John Wilmerding and others.

In 2011, the Archives of American Art became the first Smithsonian business unit to work directly with Wikipedia through the Wikipedia Galleries, Libraries, and Museums project, starting by appointing the first Smithsonian Wikipedian in Residence, Sarah Stierch.

== Collections ==
Upon the founding of the Archives, all collections, whether loaned or donated to the Archives, were duplicated on microfilm, allowing the Archives to offer easy access to its collections nationwide and to establish archival databases in New York, Washington, D.C., Boston, Detroit, and at the DeYoung Museum in San Francisco. Today's affiliates consist of the DeYoung, Boston Public Library, the Amon Carter Museum and The Huntington Library. The Archives also offers microfilm for interlibrary loan at no charge. Microfilm is no longer being produced at the Archives as it has been superseded by digitization. With funding from the Terra Foundation for American Art Digitization Program, the Archives has fully digitized numerous collections, which are accessible on their website. In April, 2011, the Archives received a second Terra grant of $3 million to fund another five years of digitization and technological developments, which began in 2005 with a $3.6 million grant from Terra.

The Archives relies heavily on grants and private donations to fund the archival processing and care of collections. In 2009 the Archives received a $213,315 grant from the Leon Levy Foundation to process the André Emmerich Gallery records and a $100,000 gift from the Kress Foundation to complete the digitization of the Jacques Seligmann & Company records. In 2009 the Archives acquired 88 collections totaling 717 linear feet.

=== Notable collections ===
The Archives holds a unique collection of material from notable artists, dealers, critics and collectors. While papers and documents make up a large portion of the Archives, more unique objects have been acquired over the years. These include a bird nest and a Kewpie doll from the collection of artist Joseph Cornell; painter George Luks' death mask; and a cast iron model car that belonged to Franz Kline. The earliest letter in the collection was written by John Smibert in 1743, in which Smibert describes to his dealer his theories about the future of art in America.

==== The papers of African American artists ====
The Archives maintain over 50 paper collections of African American artists. Subjects covered in these personal papers include the expatriate experience, racism within the arts, and the Federal Art Project. The collection includes the sketchbooks of Palmer Hayden, Horace Pippin's illustrated journal of his military service during World War I, and photographs of Alma Thomas. Other notable collections represent Charles Alston, Hughie Lee-Smith, Jacob Lawrence, Romare Bearden and Henry Ossawa Tanner.

==== The papers of Latino and Latin American artists ====
Over 100 individuals and organizations are represented in the Archives' Latin American art collection. Topics range from Mexican muralism to Surrealism, New Deal art patronage and the Chicano Movement. Notable collections include the diary of Carlos Lopez, the sketchbooks of Emilio Sanchez, source material for Mel Ramos and research materials from Esther McCoy relating to Mexican architecture. They also maintain oral histories starting in 1964.

==== The Boris Mirski Gallery ====
In 1989–1996, with additions in 2007 and 2017, Boris Mirski's family donated the records of the Boris Mirski Gallery (1944–1979) to the Archives. Mirski's Gallery showed avant-garde art, including work in the New York and international modern art styles as well as non-western art. But it was best known for being a major birthing ground for American Figurative Expressionism as a whole, and Boston Expressionism, in particular, especially for mid-century Jewish American artists. Several key figures in Boston Expressionism, linked to Mirski, have also given oral history interviews to the Archives, including Hyman Bloom, David Aronson, Jack Levine, Marianna Pineda, Arthur Polonsky and Karl Zerbe.

==== Leo Castelli Gallery ====
In 2007, gallery owner Leo Castelli's family donated his papers to the Archives. It took three years to organize the collection of more than 400 linear feet. The collection consists of the sales of every artwork sold by the gallery during Castelli's lifetime, published reviews of the gallery's exhibits, photographs, and correspondence with the many artists he represented, which included, among others, Roy Lichtenstein, Ellsworth Kelly, and Andy Warhol.

==== Rockwell Kent papers ====
Painter, author and illustrator Rockwell Kent donated his collection in 1969. It contained over 60,000 letters, notes, sketches, manuscripts, photographs and business records covering 70 years. One month later his house burned to the ground and Kent was quoted as stating that he had wished he had donated the entire house to the Archives.

=== Oral histories ===
In 1958, the Archives of American Art started an oral history program with base support from the Ford Foundation and continued with support from New York State Council on the Arts, Pew Charitable Trust, the Mark Rothko Foundation, and the Pasadena Art Alliance. Today the Archives houses nearly 2,000 oral history interviews relating to American art. The program continues today with funding from the Terra Foundation of American Art, the Brown Foundation of Houston, the Widgeon Point Charitable Foundation, the Art Dealers Association of America. Donor Nanette L. Laitman funded The Nanette L. Laitman Documentation Project for Craft and Decorative Arts in America enabling over 150 interviews with American craft artists.

In 2009, the Archives received two major grants to further their oral history program: a $75,000 grant from the A G Foundation which established the Elizabeth Murray Oral History of Women in the Visual Arts Project destined to fund oral history interviews with important women within the American art community), and a $250,000 grant from Save America's Treasures to assist with the digitization of approximately 4,000 recordings and the preservation of 6,000 hours of sound.

== Exhibitions ==
The Archives mounts rotating exhibitions of its collections at the Lawrence A. Fleischman Gallery of the Donald W. Reynolds Center for American Art and Portraiture in Washington, D.C. Exhibitions have included Of the Moment: A Video Sampler from the Archives of American Art, and Hard Times, 1929–1939, which examined the Great Depression's impact on American artists. In 2012, the Archives celebrated the centennial birth of Jackson Pollock with an exhibition of Pollock's archives and artwork.

== Administration ==
The Archives of American Art is one of nine research centers of the Smithsonian Institution. It is managed by a director, nominated by a board of trustees. Anne Helmreich was appointed the new director in 2023. Governance includes an executive committee, a council, and emeriti members.

=== Mission ===
To illuminate scholarship of the history of art in America through collecting, preserving, and making available for study the documentation of this country's rich artistic legacy.
