= Arthur Polonsky =

American painter

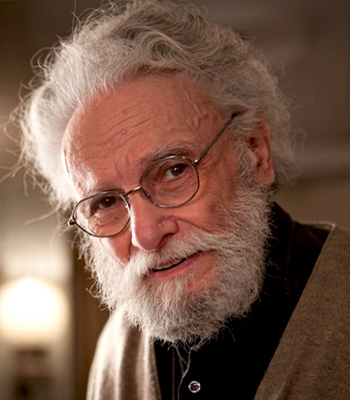
- Born: June 6, 1925; Lynn, Massachusetts
- Died: April 4, 2019 (aged 93); Newton, Massachusetts
- Education: The School of the Museum of Fine Arts
- Known for: Paintings & Drawings
- Style: Boston Expressionism
- Movement: Boston Expressionism

Arthur Polonsky (June 6, 1925 – April 4, 2019) was a figurative painter, draughtsman and educator, known for his explorations of light, water, flight and similarly lyrical motifs that, in esoteric and unsettling ways, alluded to myth, fantasy, music, the Bible, or the poetry of Symbolist and Modernist poets like Rimbaud and Rilke. "The dialogue between color, texture and subject is always alive" the late artist Barbara Swan Fink says of his work. His drawings, in particular, "have the excitement of a direct response to a subject, a daring use of line or tone, a sense of charged intensity. His portrait drawings not only have likeness but express a mood that is part artist, part model.

Polonsky was also a key participant in Boston Expressionism and, in a lengthy oral history interview for the Smithsonian's Archives of American Art, an important witness. The roots of the movement link to two separate, but overlapping, circles of mid-Century artists, and Polonsky was involved with both. The first was allied to Boston's School of the Museum of Fine Arts where Polonsky, a Museum School graduate, later taught. The second was allied to Boston's Boris Mirski Gallery where Polonsky exhibited. Artists within these circles started interacting more, in the late 1940s, when many of them, including Polonsky, Karl Zerbe and Hyman Bloom, began meeting to address fears that major Boston museums were shutting out contemporary artists. The meetings inspired more activism, including the formation of the New England Chapter of Artists Equity and the Boston Arts Festival, with the former advocating for artists' rights and representation, and the latter providing a democratic fine arts forum in the middle of Boston's Public Garden. This community organizing led not only to new arts organizations, but also a more tightly organized community of artists. The exchange of ideas and influences that resulted developed a figurative style of Expressionism specific to New England.

== Solo exhibitions ==
- Boris Mirski Gallery, 1950, 1954, 1956, 1964
- Boston Center for Arts, 1983
- Boston Public Library, 1969, 1990, 1993, 1996, 1999
- Danforth Art, 2008
- Durlacher Gallery, NYC, 1965
- Fitchburg Art Museum, 1990
- Kantar Fine Arts, Newton, MA, 2002
- Metropolitan Museum of Art, NYC, 1950
- Mickelson Gallery, Washington, DC 1966, 1974
- St. Botolph Club Gallery, Boston, 2004–2005
- Starr Gallery, Boston, 1987,

== Public collections ==
- Addison Gallery of American Art
- Brockton Art Museum, Brockton, MA
- Danforth Art
- DeCordova Museum and Sculpture Park
- Fogg Museum
- High Museum Art
- Honolulu Academy Arts
- Boston Public Library
- The Library of Congress
- Museum of Fine Arts, Boston
- Rose Art Museum
- Stedelijk Museum
- The New York Public Library
- Walker Art Center
- The White House
- Zimmerli Museum

== Honors and memberships ==
- Recipient, Louis Comfort Tiffany award for painting, 1951
- 1st prize, Boston Arts Festival, 1954
- European Traveling Fellow, School of the Museum of Fine Arts, 1948–1950
- Member, American Association of University Professors
- Member, Artists Equity Association, Inc.

== Early Expressionist Meetings ==
=== "Protest Meetings" ===
After returning from Europe in the late 1940s, Polonsky began attending meetings to protest Boston's Institute of Contemporary Art, then known as the Institute of Modern Art. Bloom, Zerbe, Shahn, Jack Levine, had gathered to express their fears "that the Institute would ... become a showcase for ... something quite different that what we thought it ought to show and support," Polonsky said. Zerbe's experience with Boston's Museum of Fine Arts, which only "owned one watercolor, and at a time when his work was being acquired quite seriously, with pleasure, by some of the other institutions, stoked those fears. The meetings jumpstarted the formation of the New England Chapter for Artist's Equity.

=== Boston Arts Festival ===
The activist artists, all connected to the Museum School or the Boris Mirski Gallery, had become a loose art club of sorts; in that capacity, they also helped organize the Boston Arts Festivals. The original Festivals, in the 1950s and 1960s, displayed fine art in tents in the Public Garden, and provided free performances in nearby Boston Common. This represented a major change in how art was presented in New England.

"It seemed like a good, exuberant, democratic, freeing kind of idea to many of us," Polonsky said. "It was very hearty, the sensations among the artists of Boston in those festivals of the first years, certainly, and the public. And much was accomplished. People like Robert Frost and MacLeish had taken it all very seriously. Productions in opera, along with that fragile tent city of exhibitions went up each year.

== Academic career ==
In the summer of 1947, Polonsky was a teaching assistant to Ben Shahn at the Museum School’s Tanglewood Program in the Berkshires. He subsequently traveled to France when awarded the Museum School’s European Traveling Fellowship upon graduation.

From 1950 to 1960, he taught painting at the Boston Museum School. In 1954, he became assistant professor at Brandeis University in the Fine Arts Department, where he remained until 1965. From 1965 to 1990, Polonsky served as associate professor at Boston University, College of Fine Arts, from which he had become professor emeritus.

== Personal life ==
Born in Lynn, Massachusetts, in 1925, Polonsky was one of two children of Jewish Russian immigrants Benjamin and Celia (Hurwitz) Polonsky.

He had a close connection with the Newton Symphony Orchestra (NSO), having created three original works for the NSO’s program, "Art for Music," and was featured on the NSO season brochures in 1981, 1983 and 1994.

Arthur is the subject of a documentary feature film called Release from Reason which is currently in production by his son, Emmy-nominated director Gabriel Polonsky.

Arthur died peacefully of natural causes on April 4, 2019, in Newton, Massachusetts. He was married from 1953 to 1982 to artist Lois Tarlow (August 30, 1928 – January 4, 2021). He is survived by their three sons Eli, D.L., and Gabriel.

Here is a tribute to Arthur Polonsky written by Charles Giuliano from the April 7, 2019 edition of Berkshire Fine Arts: https://berkshirefinearts.com/04-07-2019_artist-arthur-polonsky-at-93.htm
