= Expressionism =

Modernist art movement

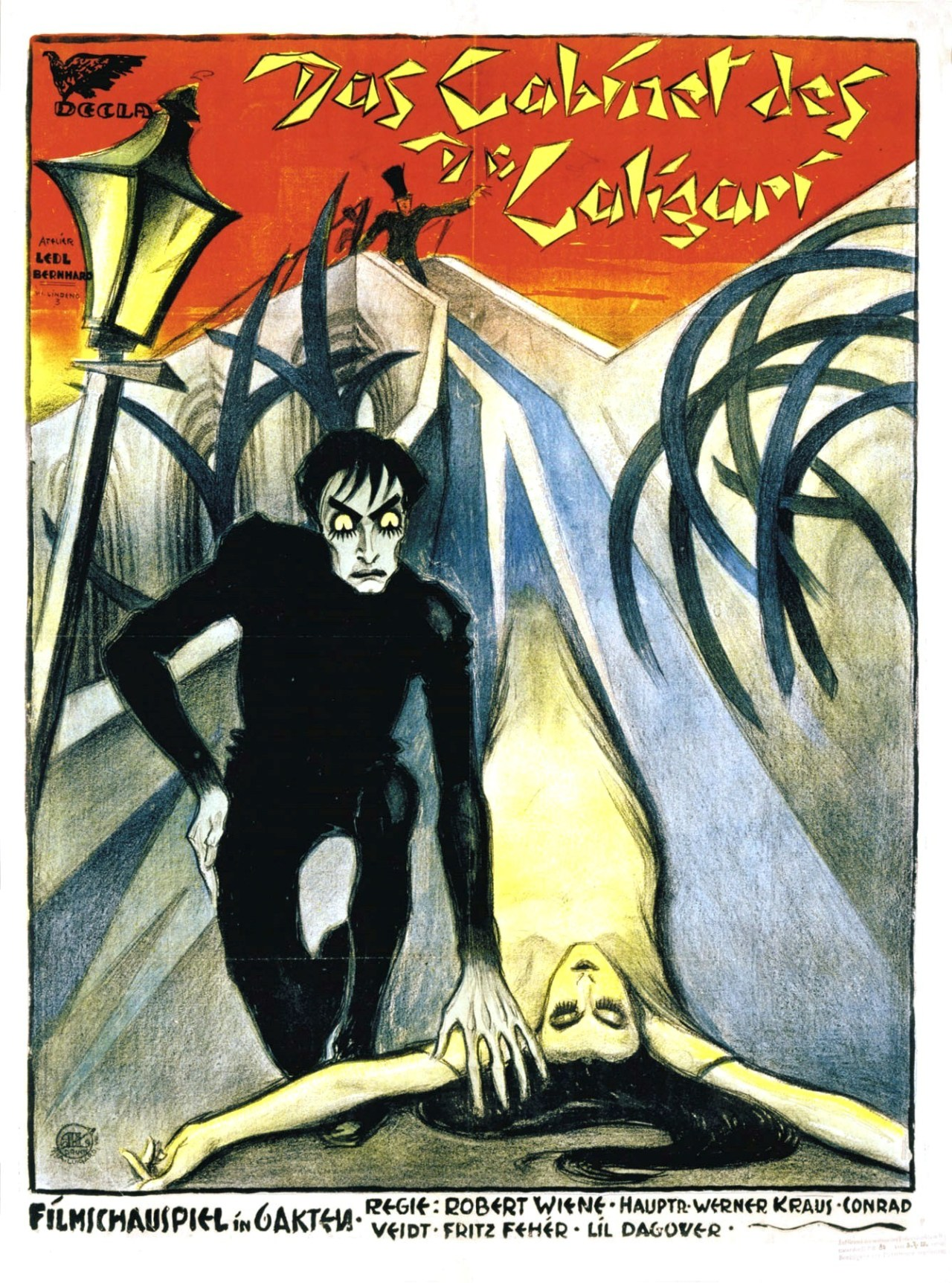
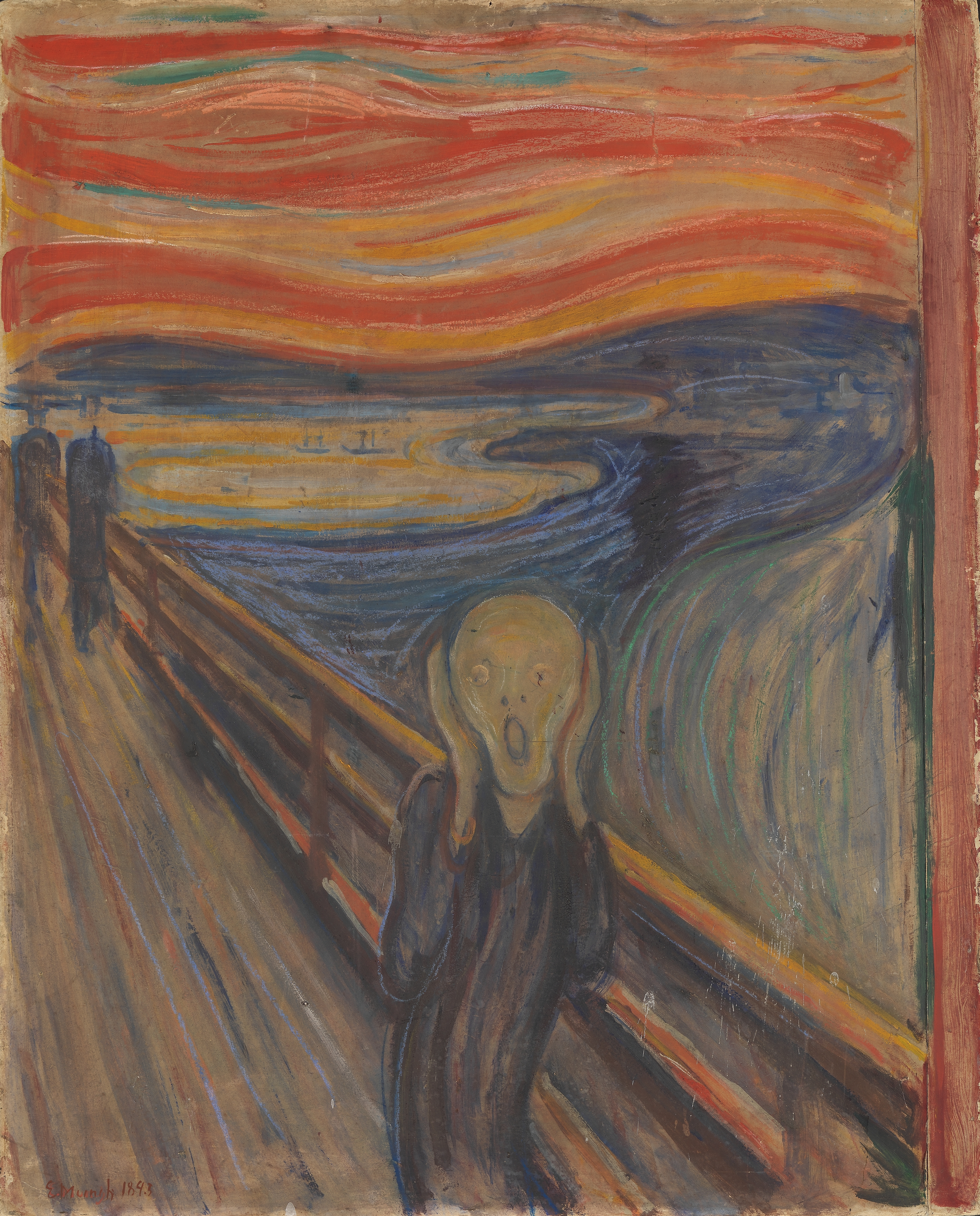
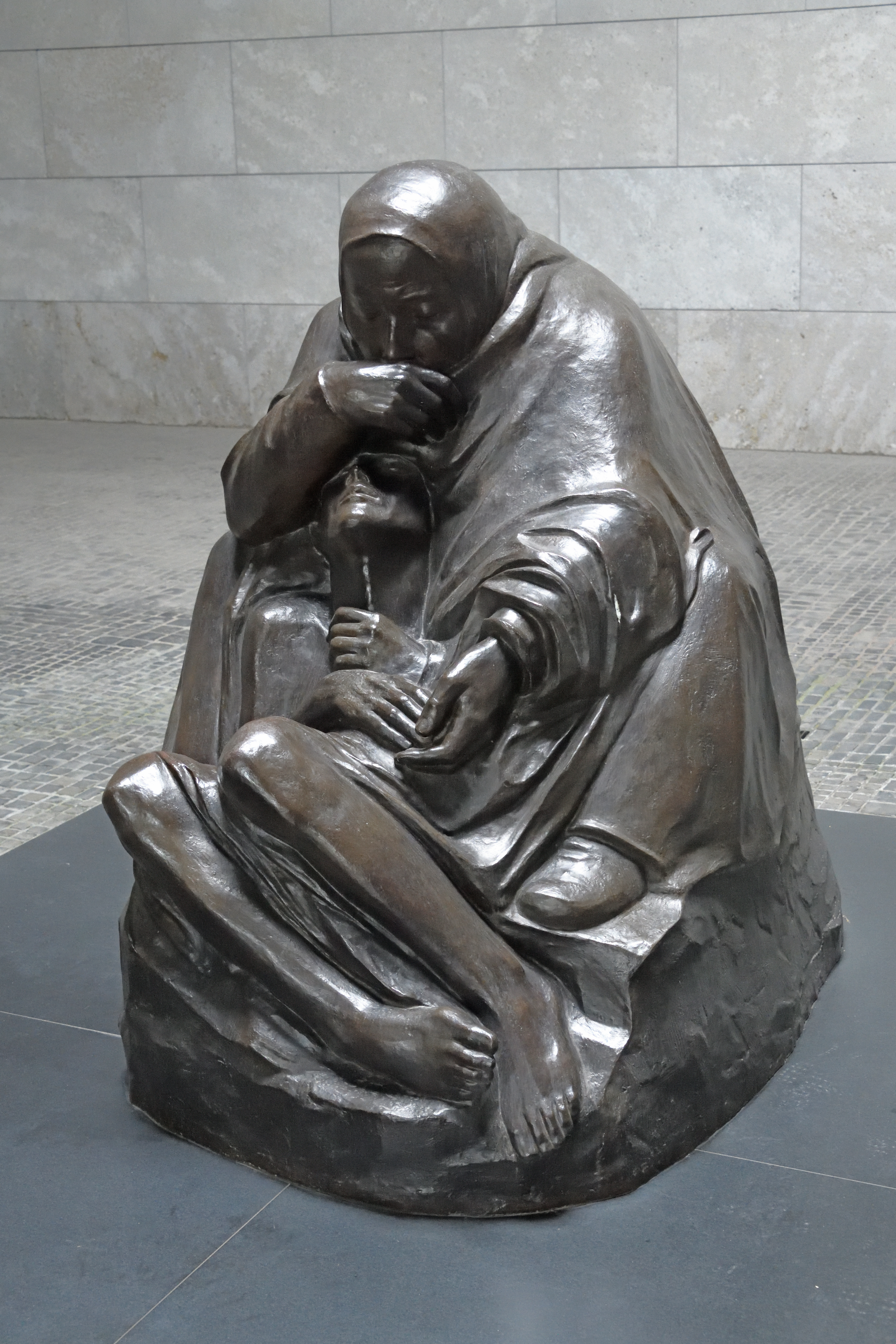
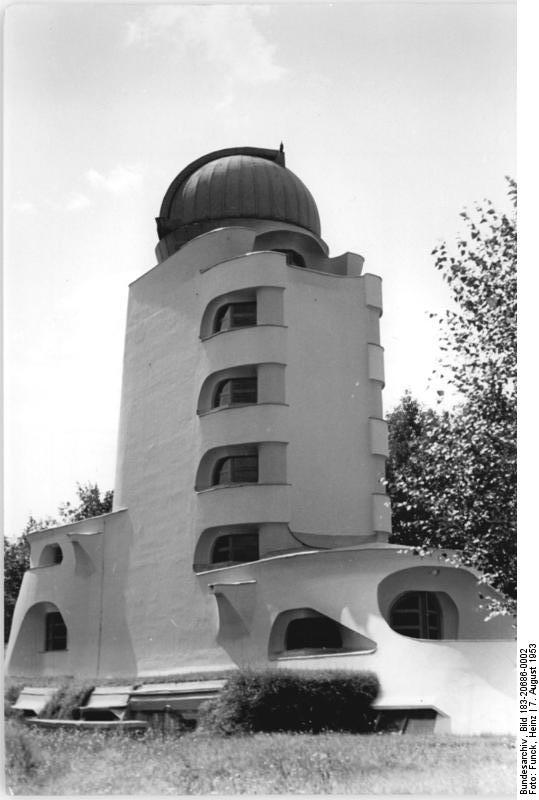
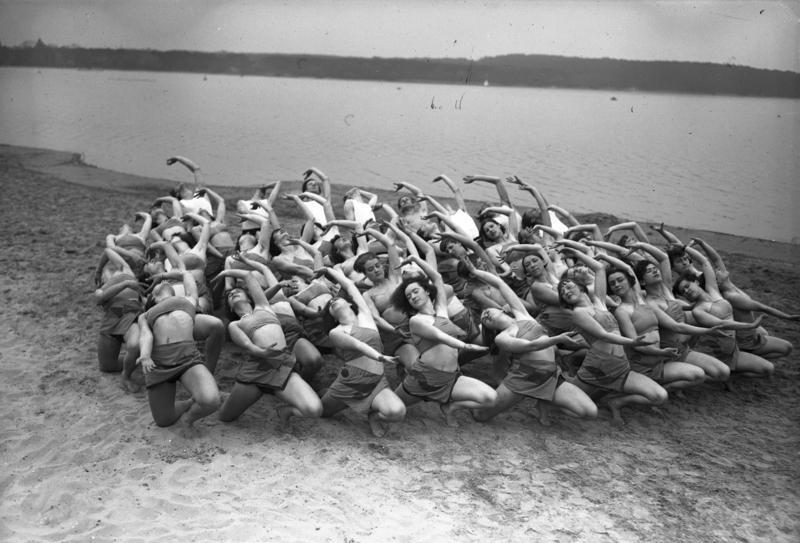
- Clockwise: 1.Edvard Munch, The Scream, c.1893, inspired 20th-century expressionists.: 2. Einstein Tower building by Erich Mendelsohn, 1924. Located in Potsdam, Germany.; 3. Dancers from the Laban Dance School practicing an expressive dance, 1930.; 4. Käthe Kollwitz, “Mother with her Dead Son”, 1937-1938; 5. The Cabinet of Dr.Caligari, 1920. Directed by Robert Wiene.

Additional media
- Years active: The years before WWI and the interwar years
- Location: Predominantly Germany
- Major figures: Artists loosely categorized within such groups as Die Brücke, Der Blaue Reiter; the Berlin Secession, the School of Paris and the Dresden Secession
- Influenced: American Figurative Expressionism, generally, and Boston Expressionism, in particular

Expressionism is a modernist movement, initially in poetry and painting, originating in Northern Europe around the beginning of the 20th century. Its typical trait is to present the world solely from a subjective perspective, distorting it radically for emotional effect in order to evoke moods or ideas. Expressionist artists have sought to express the meaning of emotional experience rather than physical reality.

Expressionism developed as an avant-garde style before the First World War. It remained popular during the Weimar Republic, particularly in Berlin. The style extended to a wide range of the arts, including expressionist architecture, painting, literature, theatre, dance, film and music. Paris became a gathering place for a group of Expressionist artists, many of Jewish origin, dubbed the School of Paris. After World War II, figurative expressionism influenced artists and styles around the world.

The term is sometimes suggestive of angst. In a historical sense, much older painters such as Matthias Grünewald and El Greco are sometimes termed expressionist, though the term is applied mainly to 20th-century works. The Expressionist emphasis on individual and subjective perspective has been characterized as a reaction to positivism and other artistic styles such as Naturalism and Impressionism.

== Etymology and history ==
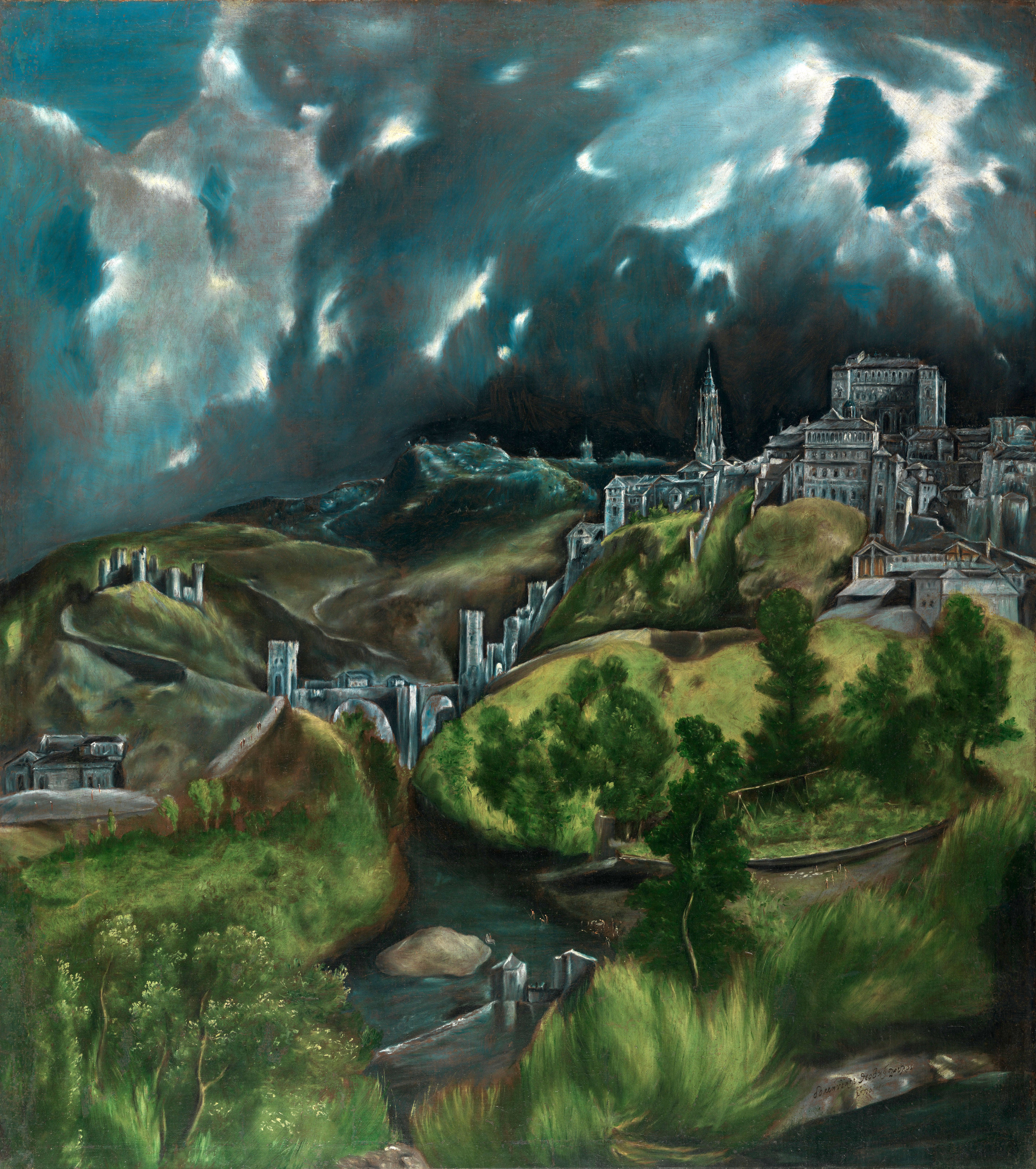
El Greco View of Toledo, 1595/1610 is a Mannerist precursor of 20th-century expressionism.

While the word expressionist was used in the modern sense as early as 1850, its origin is sometimes traced to paintings exhibited in 1901 in Paris by obscure artist Julien-Auguste Hervé, which he called Expressionismes. An alternative view is that the term was coined by the Czech art historian Antonin Matějček in 1910 as the opposite of Impressionism: "An Expressionist wishes, above all, to express himself... (an Expressionist rejects) immediate perception and builds on more complex psychic structures... Impressions and mental images that pass through ... people's soul as through a filter which rids them of all substantial accretions to produce their clear essence [...and] are assimilated and condensed into more general forms, into types, which he transcribes through simple short-hand formulae and symbols."

Important precursors of Expressionism were the German philosopher Friedrich Nietzsche (1844–1900), especially his philosophical novel Thus Spoke Zarathustra (1883–1892); the later plays of the Swedish dramatist August Strindberg (1849–1912), including the trilogy To Damascus (1898–1901), A Dream Play (1902), The Ghost Sonata (1907); Frank Wedekind (1864–1918), especially the "Lulu" plays Erdgeist (Earth Spirit) (1895) and Die Büchse der Pandora (Pandora's Box) (1904); the American poet Walt Whitman's (1819–1892) Leaves of Grass (1855–1891); the Russian novelist Fyodor Dostoevsky (1821–1881); Norwegian painter Edvard Munch (1863–1944); Dutch painter Vincent van Gogh (1853–1890); Belgian painter James Ensor (1860–1949); and pioneering Austrian psychoanalyst Sigmund Freud (1856–1939).

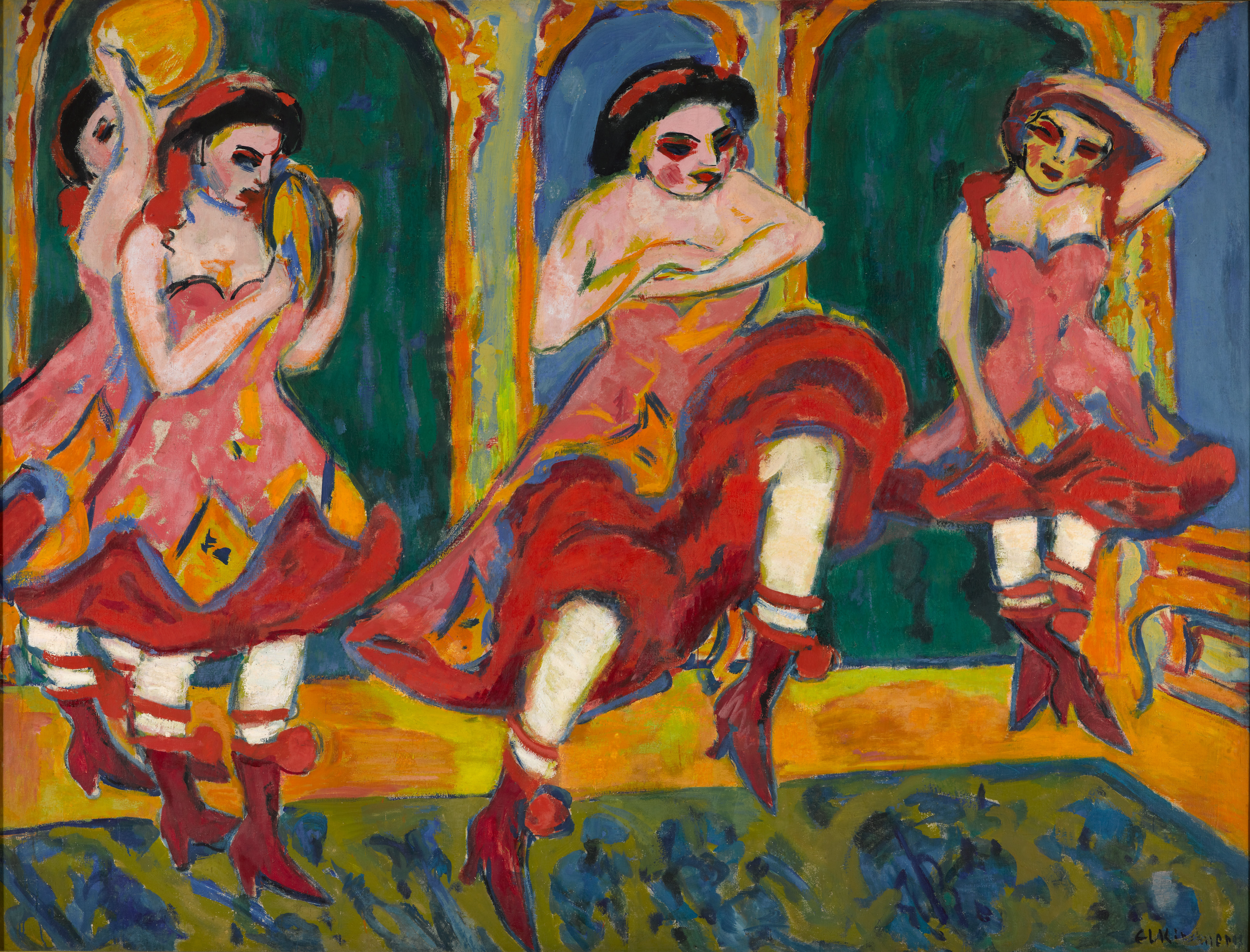
Ernst Ludwig Kirchner, Czardas Dancers, oil on canvas, 1908/1920, Kunstmuseum Den Haag

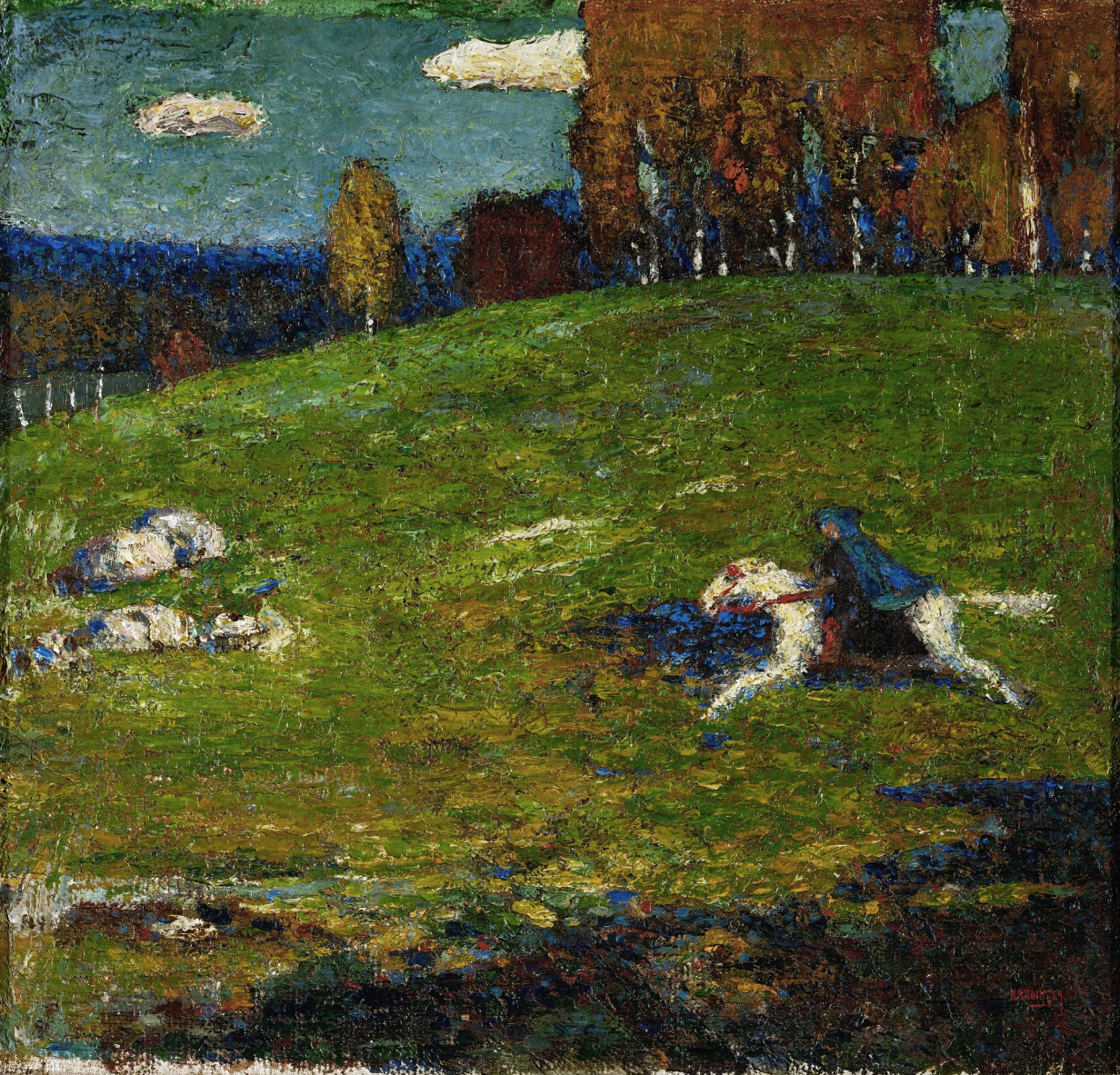
Wassily Kandinsky, Der Blaue Reiter, c.1903

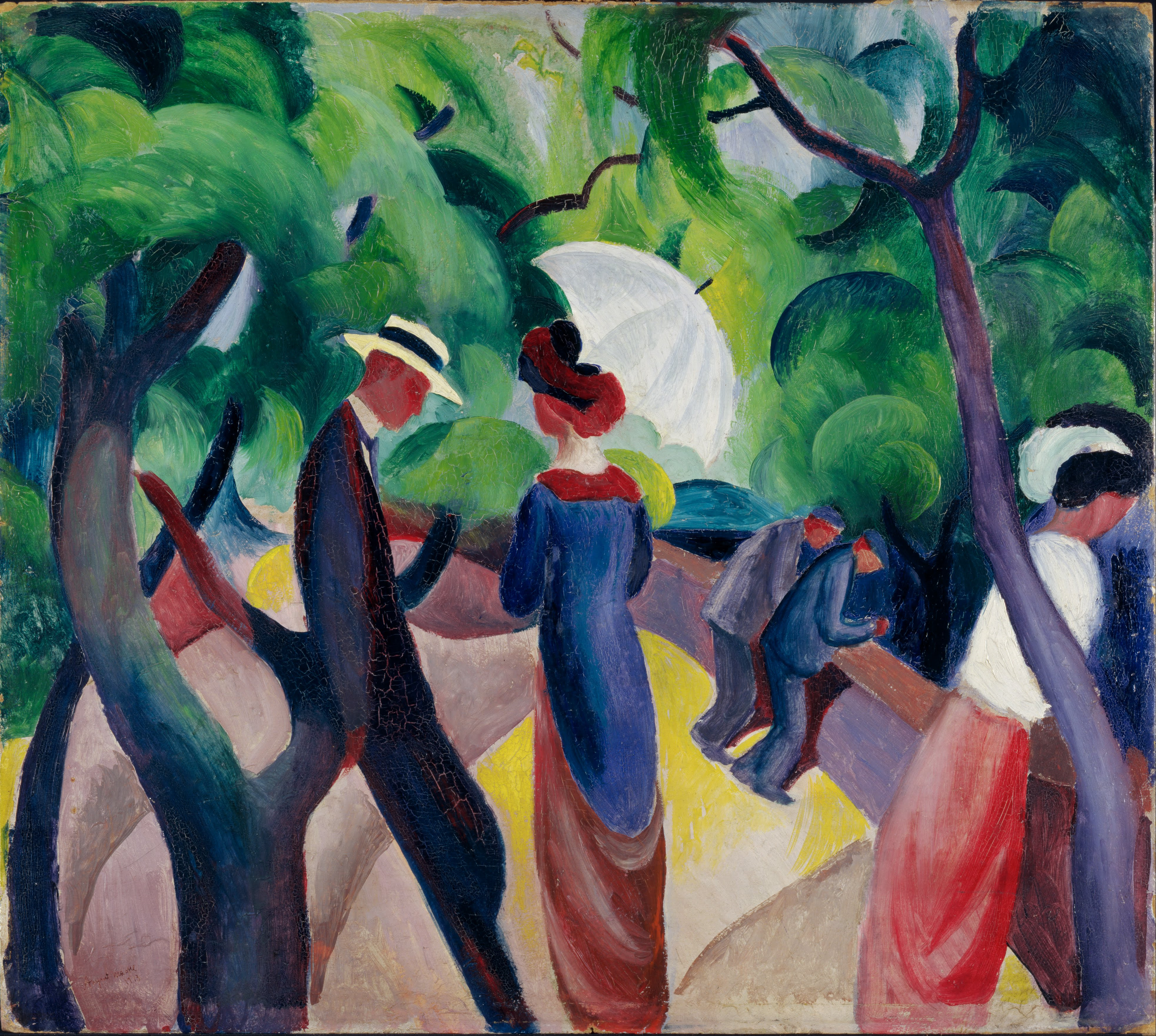
August Macke, Promenade, 1913, Städtische Galerie im Lenbachhaus, Munich

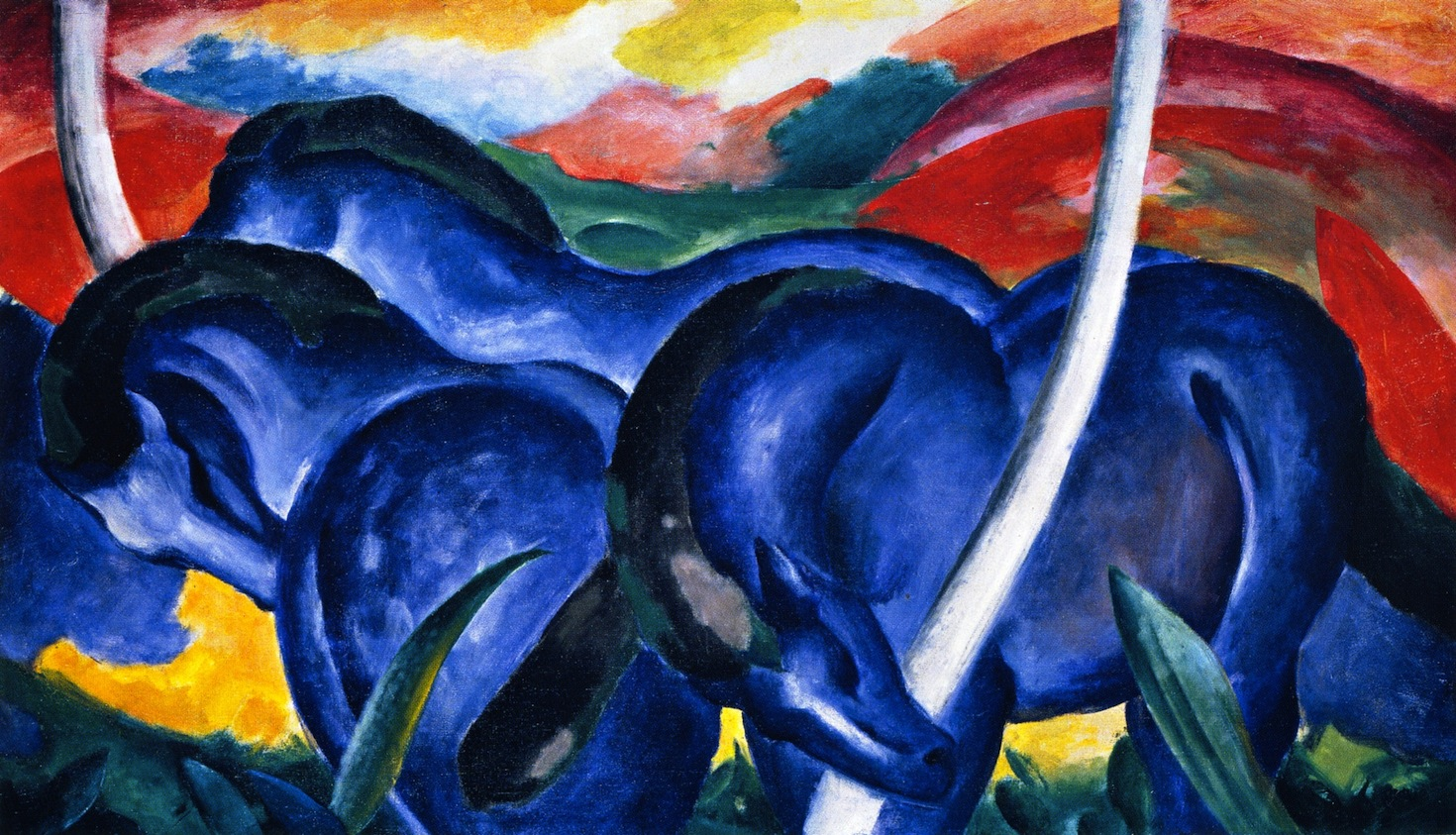
Franz Marc, Die großen blauen Pferde (The Large Blue Horses), 1911

In 1905, a group of four German artists, led by Ernst Ludwig Kirchner, formed Die Brücke (the Bridge) in the city of Dresden. This was arguably the founding organization for the German Expressionist movement, though they did not use the word itself. A few years later, in 1911, a like-minded group of young artists formed Der Blaue Reiter (The Blue Rider) in Munich. The name came from Wassily Kandinsky's Der Blaue Reiter painting of 1903. Among their members were Kandinsky, Franz Marc, Paul Klee, and August Macke. However, the term Expressionism did not firmly establish itself until 1913. Though mainly a German artistic movement initially and most predominant in painting, poetry and the theatre between 1910 and 1930, most precursors of the movement were not German. Furthermore, there have been expressionist writers of prose fiction, as well as non-German-speaking expressionist writers, and, while the movement declined in Germany with the rise of Adolf Hitler in the 1930s, there were subsequent expressionist works.

Expressionism is notoriously difficult to define, in part because it "overlapped with other major 'isms' of the modernist period: with Futurism, Vorticism, Cubism, Surrealism and Dadaism." Richard Murphy also comments, "the search for an all-inclusive definition is problematic to the extent that the most challenging expressionists such as Kafka, Gottfried Benn and Döblin were simultaneously the most vociferous 'anti-expressionists.'"

What can be said, however, is that it was a movement that developed in the early twentieth century, mainly in Germany, in reaction to the dehumanizing effect of industrialization and the growth of cities, and that "one of the central means by which expressionism identifies itself as an avant-garde movement, and by which it marks its distance to traditions and the cultural institution as a whole is through its relationship to realism and the dominant conventions of representation." More explicitly, that the expressionists rejected the ideology of realism.

The term refers to an "artistic style in which the artist seeks to depict not objective reality but rather the subjective emotions and responses that objects and events arouse within a person". It is arguable that all artists are expressive but there are many examples of art production in Europe from the 15th century onward which emphasize extreme emotion. Such art often occurs during times of social upheaval and war, such as the Protestant Reformation, German Peasants' War, and Eighty Years' War between the Spanish and the Netherlands, when extreme violence, much directed at civilians, was represented in propagandist popular prints. These were often unimpressive aesthetically but had the capacity to arouse extreme emotions in the viewer.

Expressionism has been likened to Baroque by critics such as art historian Michel Ragon and German philosopher Walter Benjamin. According to Alberto Arbasino, a difference between the two is that "Expressionism doesn't shun the violently unpleasant effect, while Baroque does. Expressionism throws some terrific 'fuck yous', Baroque doesn't. Baroque is well-mannered."

== Notable Expressionists ==
Some of the style's main visual artists of the early 20th century were:

- Argentina: Xul Solar
- Armenia: Martiros Saryan
- Australia: Sidney Nolan, Charles Blackman, John Perceval, Albert Tucker, and Joy Hester.
- Austria: Richard Gerstl, Egon Schiele, Oskar Kokoschka, Josef Gassler and Alfred Kubin
- Belgium: Marcel Caron, Anto Carte, and Auguste Mambour, and the Flemish Expressionists: Constant Permeke, Gustave De Smet, Frits Van den Berghe, James Ensor, Albert Servaes, Floris Jespers, Gustave Van de Woestijne and Tony Mafia.
- Brazil: Anita Malfatti, Cândido Portinari, Di Cavalcanti, Iberê Camargo and Lasar Segall.
- Denmark: Einer Johansen, Jens Søndergaard, Oluf Høst
- Estonia: Konrad Mägi, Eduard Wiiralt, Kuno Veeber
- Finland: Tyko Sallinen, Alvar Cawén, and Wäinö Aaltonen.
- France: Frédéric Fiebig, Georges Rouault, Alexandre Frenel, Georges Gimel, Gen Paul, Marie-Thérèse Auffray, Jacques Démoulin and Bernard Buffet.
- Germany: Ernst Barlach, Max Beckmann, Fritz Bleyl, Heinrich Campendonk, Otto Dix, Conrad Felixmüller, George Grosz, Erich Heckel, Carl Hofer, Max Kaus, Ernst Ludwig Kirchner, Käthe Kollwitz, Wilhelm Lehmbruck, Elfriede Lohse-Wächtler, August Macke, Franz Marc, Ludwig Meidner, Paula Modersohn-Becker, Otto Mueller, Gabriele Münter, Rolf Nesch, Emil Nolde, Max Pechstein, Christian Rohlfs, Karl Schmidt-Rottluff, Georg Tappert and Wolfgang Wolff.
- Greece: George Bouzianis
- Hungary: Tivadar Kosztka Csontváry
- Iceland: Einar Hákonarson
- Ireland: Jack B. Yeats
- Indonesia: Affandi, Hasan Djaafar, Hendra Gunawan and S. Sudjojono
- Israel: Isaac Frenkel Frenel
- Italy: Amedeo Modigliani, Emilio Giuseppe Dossena
- Japan: Kōshirō Onchi
- Latvia: Jānis Tīdemanis
- Lebanon: Rafic Charaf
- Mexico: Mathias Goeritz (German émigré to Mexico), Rufino Tamayo
- Netherlands: Willem Hofhuizen, Herman Kruyder, Jan Sluyters, Jan Wiegers and Hendrik Werkman
- Norway: Edvard Munch, Kai Fjell
- Poland: Henryk Gotlib
- Portugal: Mário Eloy, Amadeo de Souza Cardoso
- Russia: Wassily Kandinsky, Marc Chagall, Chaïm Soutine, Alexej von Jawlensky, Natalia Goncharova, Mstislav Dobuzhinsky, and Marianne von Werefkin (Russian-born, later active in Germany and Switzerland).
- Romania: Horia Bernea
- Serbia: Nadežda Petrović
- South Africa: Maggie Laubser, Irma Stern
- Spain Ignacio Zuloaga, José Gutiérrez Solana, Julio Romero de Torres
- Sweden: Ester Almqvist, Leander Engström, Isaac Grünewald, Axel Törneman
- Switzerland: Carl Eugen Keel, Cuno Amiet, Paul Klee
- Ukraine: Alexis Gritchenko (Ukraine-born, most active in France), Vadim Meller
- United Kingdom: Francis Bacon, Frank Auerbach, Leon Kossoff, Lucian Freud, Patrick Heron, John Hoyland, Howard Hodgkin, John Walker
- United States: Ivan Albright, David Aronson, Milton Avery, Leonard Baskin, George Biddle, Hyman Bloom, Peter Blume, Charles Burchfield, David Burliuk, Stuart Davis, Lyonel Feininger, Wilhelmina Weber Furlong, Elaine de Kooning, Willem de Kooning, Beauford Delaney, Arthur G. Dove, Norris Embry, Philip Evergood, Kahlil Gibran, William Gropper, Philip Guston, Marsden Hartley, Albert Kotin, Yasuo Kuniyoshi, Rico Lebrun, Jack Levine, Alfred Henry Maurer, Robert Motherwell, Alice Neel, Abraham Rattner, Esther Rolick, Ben Shahn, Harry Shoulberg, Joseph Stella, Harry Sternberg, Henry Ossawa Tanner, Dorothea Tanning, Steffen Thomas, Wilhelmina Weber, Max Weber, Hale Woodruff, Karl Zerbe.
- Uruguay: Rafael Barradas

== Groups of painters ==
=== In Germany and Austria ===
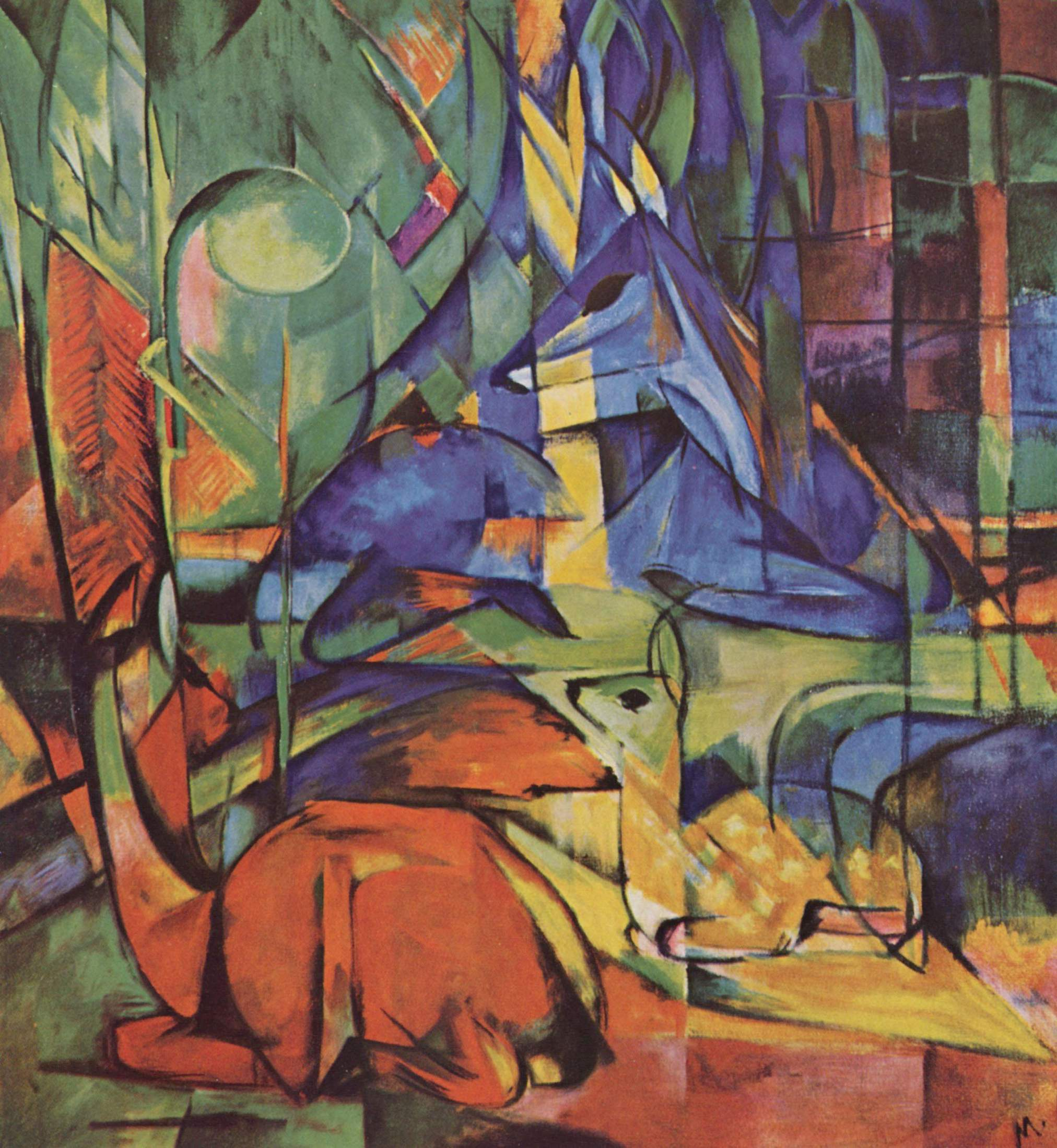
Franz Marc, Rehe im Walde (Deer in Woods), 1914

The style originated principally in Germany and Austria. There were groups of expressionist painters, including Der Blaue Reiter and Die Brücke. Der Blaue Reiter (The Blue Rider, named after a painting) was based in Munich and Die Brücke (The Bridge) was originally based in Dresden (some members moved to Berlin). Die Brücke was active for a longer period than Der Blaue Reiter, which was only together for a year (1912). The Expressionists were influenced by artists and sources including Edvard Munch, Vincent van Gogh and African art. They were also aware of the work being done by the Fauves in Paris, who influenced Expressionism's tendency toward arbitrary colours and jarring compositions. In reaction and opposition to French Impressionism, which emphasized the rendering of the visual appearance of objects, Expressionist artists sought to portray emotions and subjective interpretations. It was not important to reproduce an aesthetically pleasing impression of the artistic subject matter, they felt, but rather to represent vivid emotional reactions by powerful colours and dynamic compositions. Kandinsky, the main artist of Der Blaue Reiter, believed that with simple colours and shapes the spectator could perceive the moods and feelings in the paintings, a theory that encouraged him towards increased abstraction.

=== The School of Paris ===
In Paris a group of artists dubbed the École de Paris (School of Paris) by André Warnod were also known for their expressionist art. This was especially prevalent amongst the foreign born Jewish painters of the School of Paris such as Chaim Soutine, Marc Chagall, Yitzhak Frenkel, Abraham Mintchine and others. These artists' expressionism was described as restless and emotional by Frenkel. These artists, centered in the Montparnasse district of Paris tended to portray human subjects and humanity, evoking emotion through facial expression. Others focused on the expression of mood rather than a formal structure. The art of Jewish expressionists was characterized as dramatic and tragic, perhaps in connection to Jewish suffering following persecution and pogroms.

=== In the United States ===
The ideas of German expressionism influenced the work of American artist Marsden Hartley, who met Kandinsky in Germany in 1913 Katherine Sophie Dreier and Marcel Duchamp were likely among the first to attempt to introduce "modern art" to New York with the founding of the Société Anonyme in 1920. Their pioneering efforts were continued in 1929 by William Henry Fox, director of the Brooklyn Museum, who also advocated for the promotion of modern, and in particular, Expressionist art. Nevertheless, the reception of Expressionist art from Germany was initially marked by considerable skepticism. It was not until the Munich exhibition "Entartete Kunst" in 1937 that a drastic shift occurred in the United States: Expressionist works began to be increasingly acquired and exhibited by American museums—above all, to present them as an expression of a resistant culture in opposition to an authoritarian regime hostile to freedom. In late 1939, at the beginning of World War II, New York City received many European artists. After the war, Expressionism influenced many young American artists. Norris Embry (1921–1981) studied with Oskar Kokoschka in 1947 and during the next 43 years produced a large body of work in the Expressionist tradition. Embry has been termed "the first American German Expressionist". Other American artists of the late 20th and early 21st century have developed distinct styles that may be considered part of Expressionism.

After World War II, figurative expressionism influenced artists and styles around the world. In the U.S., American Expressionism and American Figurative Expressionism, particularly Boston Expressionism, were an integral part of American modernism around the Second World War. Thomas B. Hess wrote that "the 'New figurative painting' which some have been expecting as a reaction against Abstract Expressionism was implicit in it at the start, and is one of its most lineal continuities."

- Major figurative Boston Expressionists included: Karl Zerbe, Hyman Bloom, Jack Levine, David Aronson. The Boston Expressionists persisted after World War II despite their marginalization by the development of abstract expressionism centered in New York City, and are currently in the third generation.
- New York Figurative Expressionism of the 1950s represented New York figurative artists such as Robert Beauchamp, Elaine de Kooning, Robert Goodnough, Grace Hartigan, Lester Johnson, Alex Katz, George McNeil (artist), Jan Muller, Fairfield Porter, Gregorio Prestopino, Larry Rivers and Bob Thompson.
- Lyrical Abstraction, Tachisme of the 1940s and 1950s in Europe represented by artists such as Georges Mathieu, Hans Hartung, Nicolas de Staël and others.
- Bay Area Figurative Movement represented by early figurative expressionists from the San Francisco area Elmer Bischoff, Richard Diebenkorn, and David Park. The movement from 1950 to 1965 was joined by Theophilus Brown, Paul Wonner, Hassel Smith, Nathan Oliveira, Jay DeFeo, Joan Brown, Manuel Neri, Frank Lobdell, and Roland Peterson.
- Abstract expressionism of the 1950s represented American artists such as Louise Bourgeois, Hans Burkhardt, Mary Callery, Nicolas Carone, Willem de Kooning, Jackson Pollock, Philip Guston, and others that participated with figurative expressionism.
- Sōsaku-hanga (創作版画 "creative prints") was an expressionist woodblock print movement in early 20th century Japan. The movement was characterized by the work of Kanae Yamamoto (artist), Kōshirō Onchi, and many others.
- Lyrical Abstraction in the United States and Canada beginning during the late 1960s and the 1970s. Characterized by the work of Dan Christensen, Peter Young, Ronnie Landfield, Ronald Davis, Larry Poons, Walter Darby Bannard, Charles Arnoldi, Pat Lipsky and many others.
- Neo-expressionism was an international revival style that began in the late 1970s and 1980s.

== Representative paintings ==
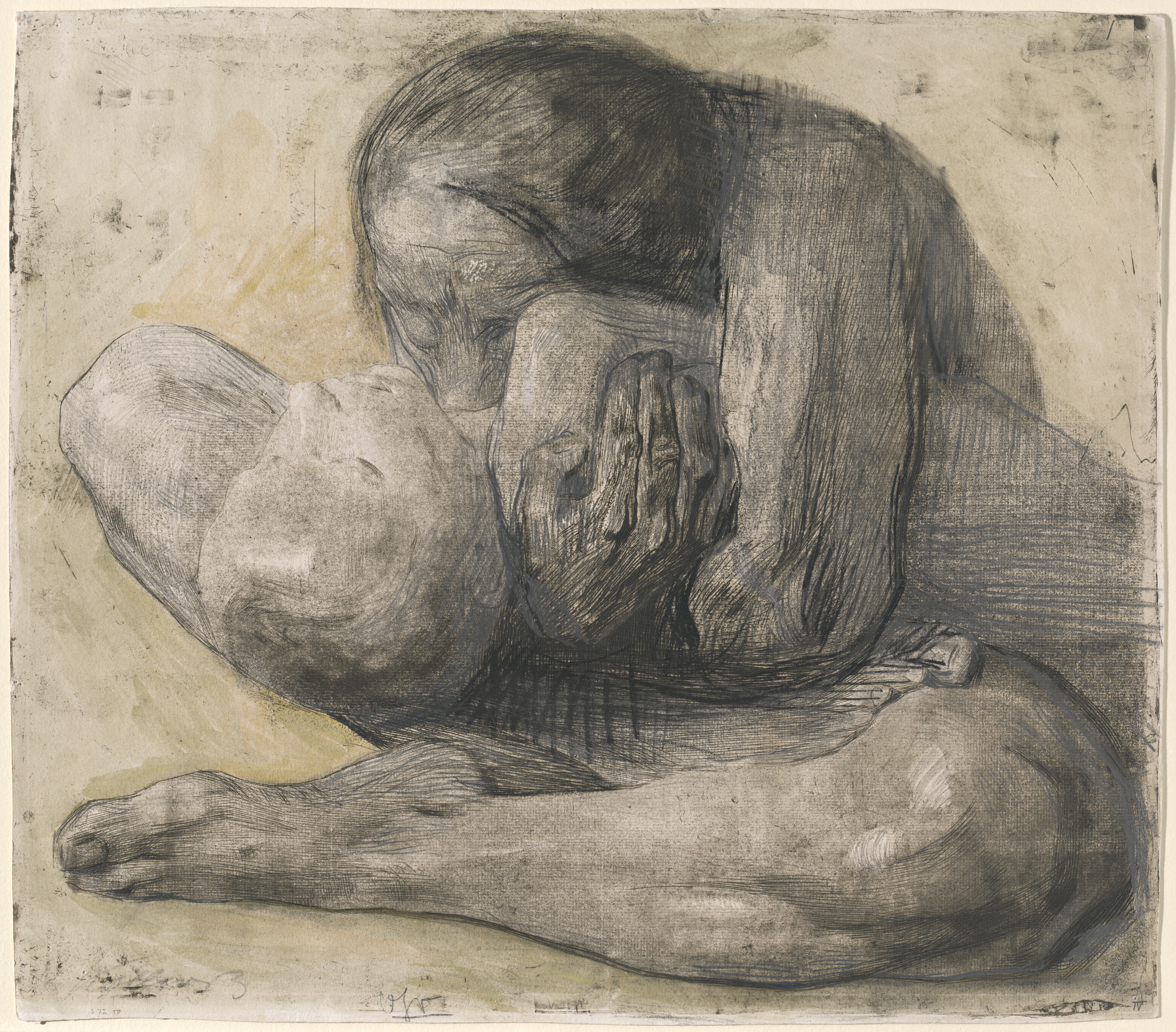
Käthe Kollwitz, Woman with Dead Child, 1903, etching, Museum of Modern Art

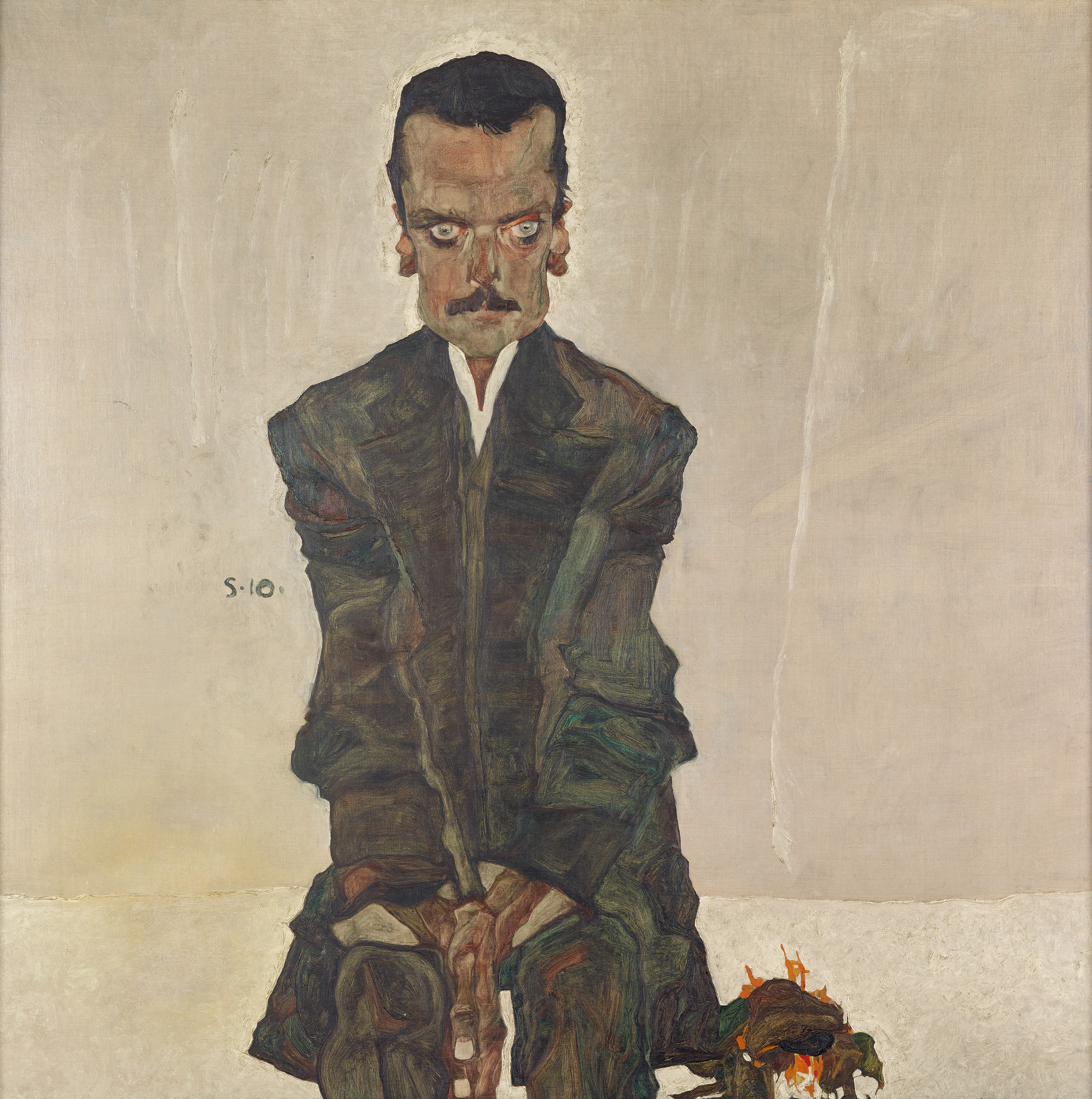
Egon Schiele, Portrait of Eduard Kosmack, c. 1910, oil on canvas, 100 × 100 cm, Österreichische Galerie Belvedere

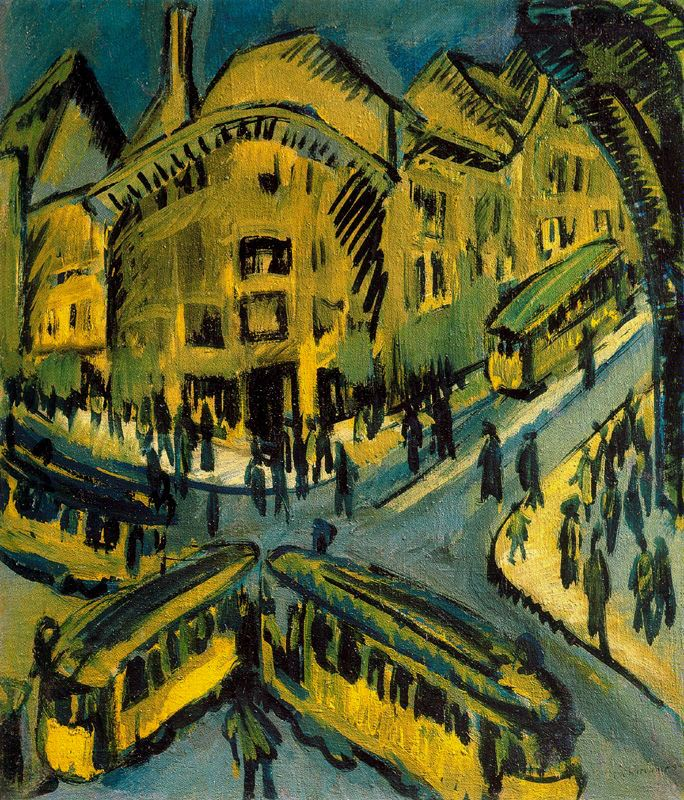
Ernst Ludwig Kirchner, Nollendorfplatz, 1912

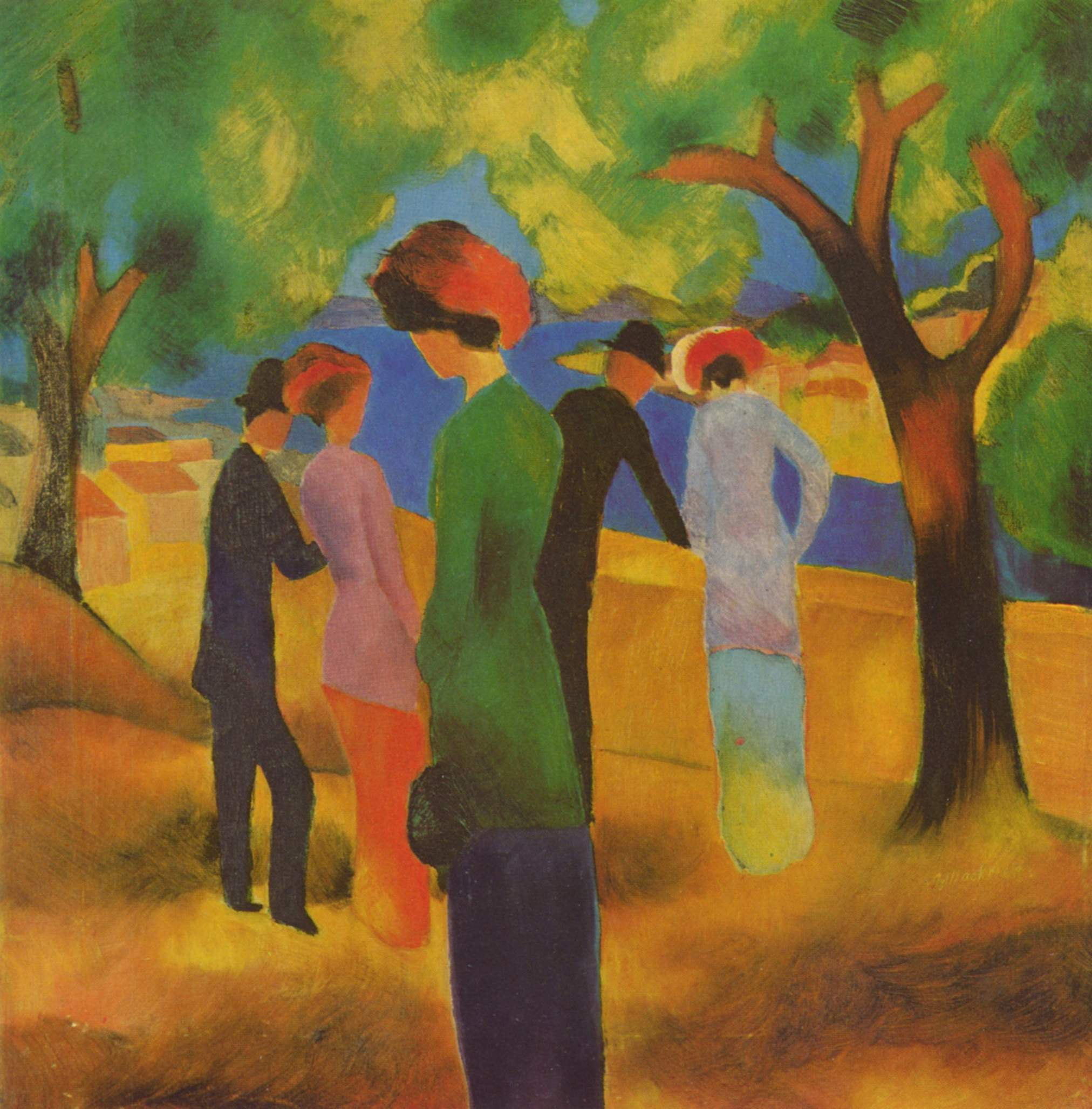
August Macke, Lady in a Green Jacket, 1913

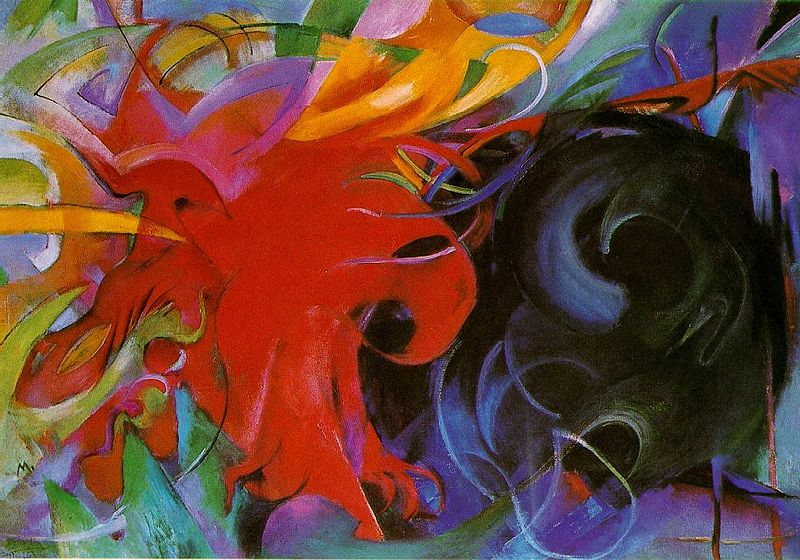
Franz Marc, Fighting Forms, 1914

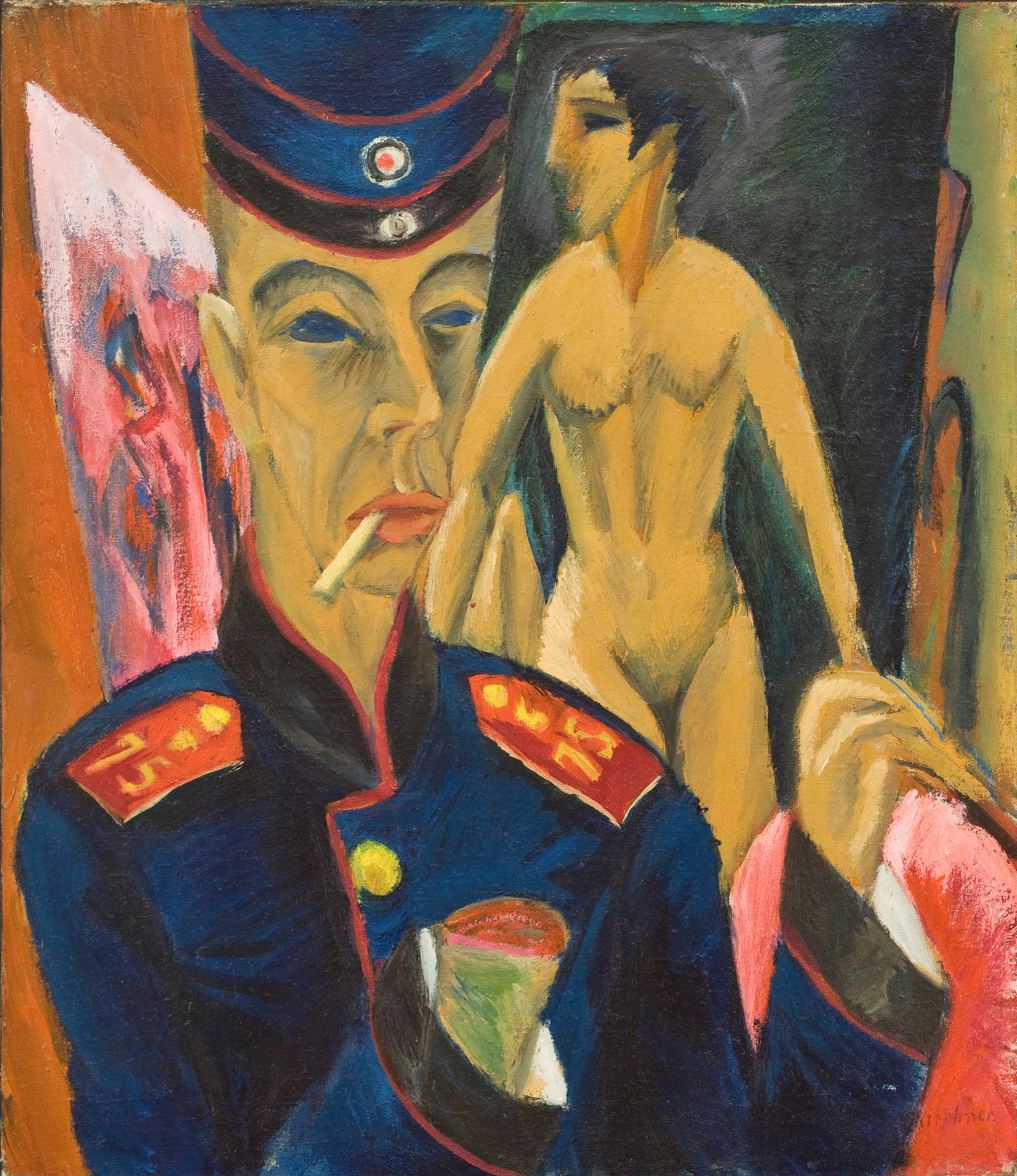
Ernst Ludwig Kirchner, Self-Portrait as a Soldier, 1915

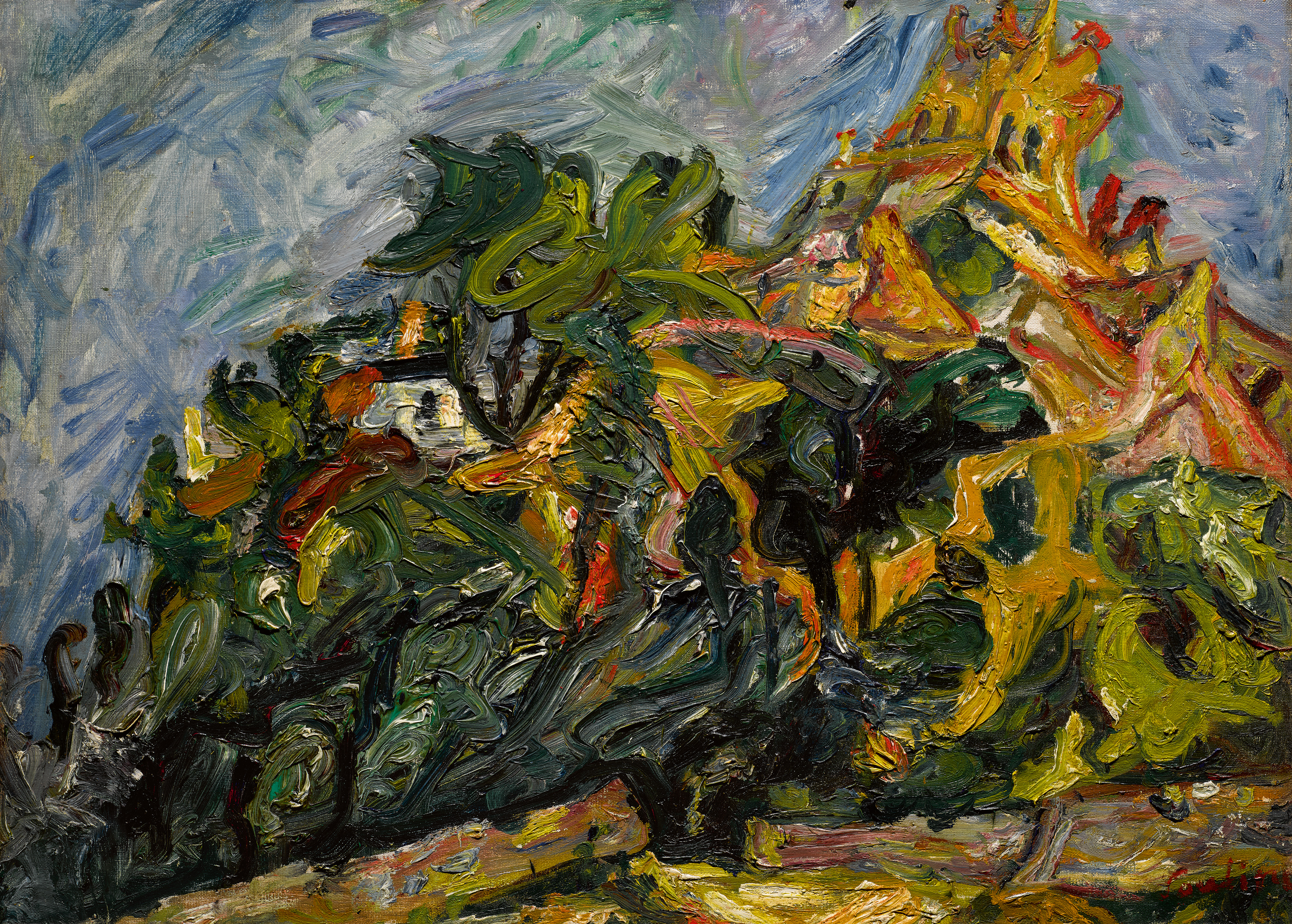
Chaïm Soutine - Vue de Céret, 1922

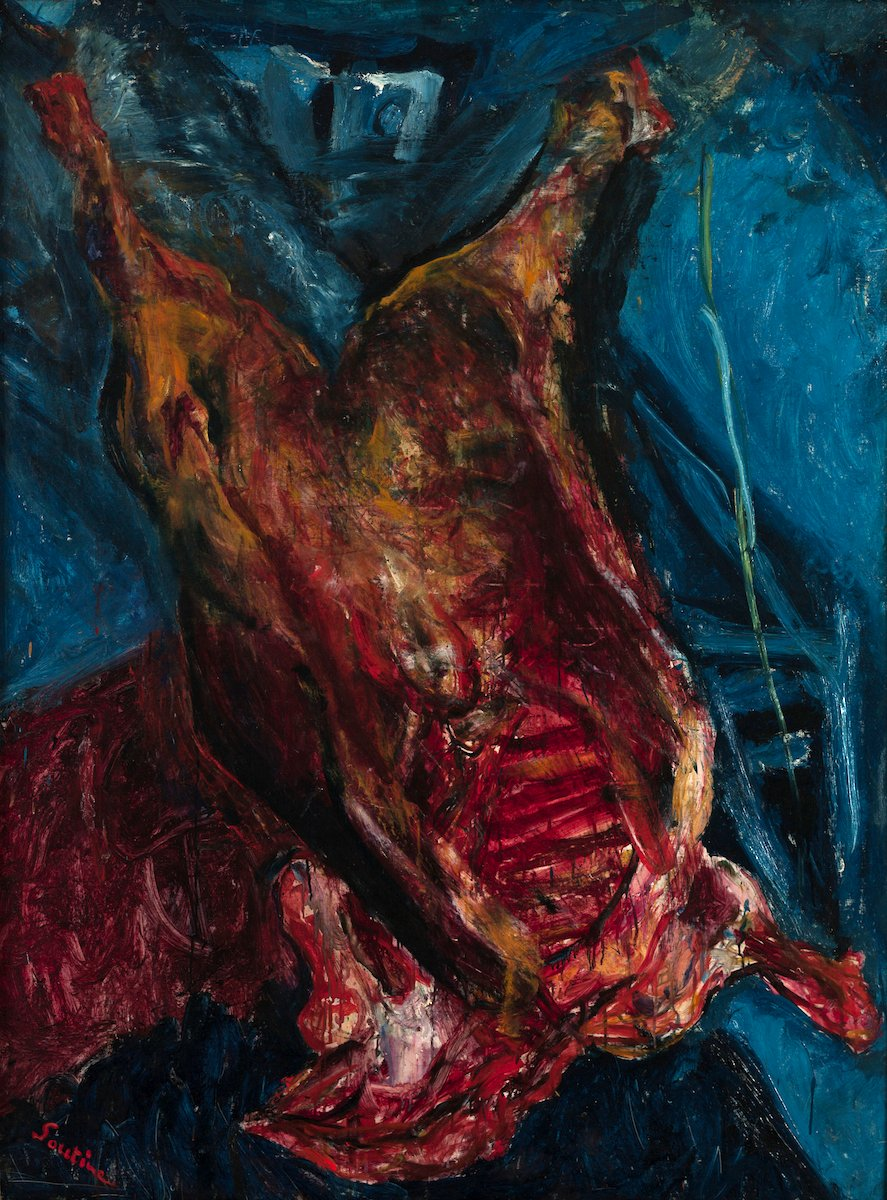
Chaim Soutine - Carcass of Beef, c. 1925

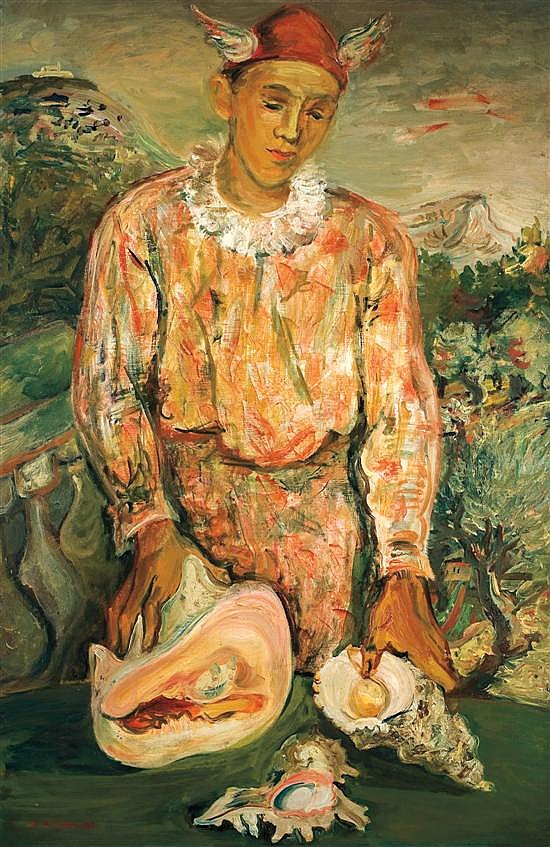
Abraham Mintchine - Pierrot, 1928

== In other arts ==
The Expressionist movement included other types of culture, including dance, sculpture, cinema and theatre.

=== Dance ===
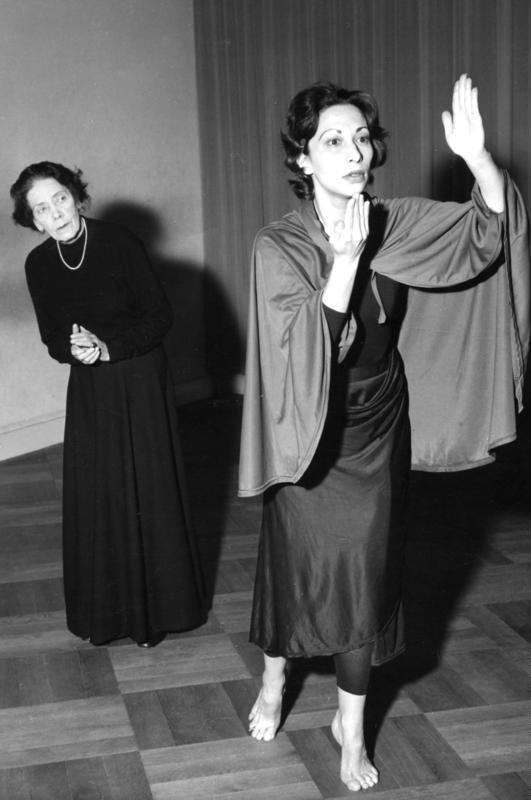
Mary Wigman (left), pioneer of Expressionist dance at her West Berlin studio in 1959

Exponents of expressionist dance included Mary Wigman, Rudolf von Laban, and Pina Bausch.

=== Sculpture ===
Some sculptors used the Expressionist style, as for example Ernst Barlach. Other expressionist artists known mainly as painters, such as Erich Heckel, also worked with sculpture.

=== Cinema ===
There was an Expressionist style in German cinema, important examples of which are Robert Wiene's The Cabinet of Dr. Caligari (1920), Paul Wegener's The Golem: How He Came into the World (1920), Fritz Lang's Metropolis (1927) and F. W. Murnau's Nosferatu, a Symphony of Horror (1922) and The Last Laugh (1924). The term "expressionist" is also sometimes used to refer to stylistic devices thought to resemble those of German Expressionism, such as film noir cinematography or the style of several of the films of Ingmar Bergman. The techniques that correlate with this movement includes distorted set design, chiaroscuro lighting, stylised acting, distorted camera angles, and superimposition. These stylistic devices appear prominently in some classic Hollywood films, such as F.W.Murnau's Sunrise: A Song of Two Humans (1927), which suggests the impact of the new wave of German film makers on American cinema.

However more generally, the term expressionism can be used to describe cinematic styles of great artifice, such as the technicolor melodramas of Douglas Sirk or the sound and visual design of David Lynch's films.

=== Literature ===
==== Journals ====
Two leading Expressionist journals published in Berlin were Der Sturm, published by Herwarth Walden starting in 1910, and Die Aktion, which first appeared in 1911 and was edited by Franz Pfemfert. Der Sturm published poetry and prose from contributors such as Peter Altenberg, Max Brod, Richard Dehmel, Alfred Döblin, Anatole France, Knut Hamsun, Arno Holz, Karl Kraus, Selma Lagerlöf, Adolf Loos, Heinrich Mann, Paul Scheerbart, and René Schickele, and writings, drawings, and prints by such artists as Kokoschka, Kandinsky, and members of Der blaue Reiter.

==== Drama ====
Oskar Kokoschka's 1909 playlet, Murderer, The Hope of Women is often termed the first expressionist drama. In it, an unnamed man and woman struggle for dominance. The man brands the woman; she stabs and imprisons him. He frees himself and she falls dead at his touch. As the play ends, he slaughters all around him (in the words of the text) "like mosquitoes." The extreme simplification of characters to mythic types, choral effects, declamatory dialogue and heightened intensity all would become characteristic of later expressionist plays. The German composer Paul Hindemith created an operatic version of this play, which premiered in 1921.

Expressionism was a dominant influence on early 20th-century German theatre, of which Georg Kaiser and Ernst Toller were the most famous playwrights. Other notable Expressionist dramatists included Reinhard Sorge, Walter Hasenclever, Hans Henny Jahnn, and Arnolt Bronnen. Important precursors were the Swedish playwright August Strindberg and German actor and dramatist Frank Wedekind. During the 1920s, Expressionism enjoyed a brief period of influence in American theatre, including the early modernist plays by Eugene O'Neill (The Hairy Ape, The Emperor Jones and The Great God Brown), Sophie Treadwell (Machinal) and Elmer Rice (The Adding Machine).

Expressionist plays often dramatise the spiritual awakening and sufferings of their protagonists. Some utilise an episodic dramatic structure and are known as Stationendramen (station plays), modeled on the presentation of the suffering and death of Jesus in the Stations of the Cross. Strindberg had pioneered this form with his autobiographical trilogy To Damascus. These plays also often dramatise the struggle against bourgeois values and established authority, frequently personified by the Father. In Sorge's The Beggar, (Der Bettler), for example, the young hero's mentally ill father raves about the prospect of mining the riches of Mars and is finally poisoned by his son. In Bronnen's Parricide (Vatermord), the son stabs his tyrannical father to death, only to have to fend off the frenzied sexual overtures of his mother.

In Expressionist drama, the speech may be either expansive and rhapsodic, or clipped and telegraphic. Director Leopold Jessner became famous for his expressionistic productions, often set on stark, steeply raked flights of stairs (having borrowed the idea from the Symbolist director and designer, Edward Gordon Craig). Staging was especially important in Expressionist drama, with directors forgoing the illusion of reality to block actors in as close to two-dimensional movement. Directors also made heavy use of lighting effects to create stark contrast and as another method to heavily emphasize emotion and convey the play or a scene's message.

German expressionist playwrights:

- Georg Kaiser (1878)
- Ernst Toller (1893–1939)
- Hans Henny Jahnn (1894–1959)
- Reinhard Sorge (1892–1916)
- Bertolt Brecht (1898–1956)

Playwrights influenced by Expressionism:

- Seán O'Casey (1880–1964)
- Eugene O'Neill (1885–1953)
- Elmer Rice (1892–1967)
- Tennessee Williams (1911–1983)
- Arthur Miller (1915–2005)
- Samuel Beckett (1906–1989)

==== Poetry ====
Among the poets associated with German Expressionism were:

- Jakob van Hoddis
- Georg Trakl
- Walter Rheiner
- Gottfried Benn
- Georg Heym
- Else Lasker-Schüler
- Ernst Stadler
- August Stramm
- Rainer Maria Rilke (1875–1926): The Notebooks of Malte Laurids Brigge (1910)
- Geo Milev

Other poets influenced by expressionism:

- T. S. Eliot
- Rudolf Broby-Johansen
- Tom Kristensen
- Pär Lagerkvist
- Edith Södergran

==== Prose ====
In prose, the early stories and novels of Alfred Döblin were influenced by Expressionism, and Franz Kafka is sometimes labelled an Expressionist.

Some further writers and works that have been called Expressionist include:

- Franz Kafka (1883–1924): "The Metamorphosis" (1915), The Trial (1925), The Castle (1926)
- Alfred Döblin (1878–1957): Berlin Alexanderplatz (1929)
- Wyndham Lewis (1882–1957)
- Djuna Barnes (1892–1982): Nightwood (1936)
- Malcolm Lowry (1909–1957): Under the Volcano (1947)
- Ernest Hemingway
- James Joyce (1882–1941): "The Nighttown" section of Ulysses (1922)
- Patrick White (1912–1990)
- D. H. Lawrence
- Sheila Watson: Double Hook
- Elias Canetti: Auto-da-Fé
- Thomas Pynchon
- William Faulkner
- James Hanley (1897–1985)
- Raul Brandão (1867–1930): Húmus (1917)
- Leonid Andreyev (1871–1919): Devil's Diary (1919)

=== Music ===
The term expressionism "was probably first applied to music in 1918, especially to Schoenberg", because like the painter Kandinsky he avoided "traditional forms of beauty" to convey powerful feelings in his music. Arnold Schoenberg, Anton Webern and Alban Berg, the members of the Second Viennese School, are important Expressionists (Schoenberg was also an expressionist painter). Other composers that have been associated with expressionism are Krenek (the Second Symphony), Paul Hindemith (The Young Maiden), Igor Stravinsky (Japanese Songs), Alexander Scriabin (late piano sonatas) (Adorno 2009, 275). Another significant expressionist was Béla Bartók in early works, written in the second decade of the 20th century, such as Bluebeard's Castle (1911), The Wooden Prince (1917), and The Miraculous Mandarin (1919). Important precursors of expressionism are Richard Wagner (1813–1883), Gustav Mahler (1860–1911), and Richard Strauss (1864–1949).

Theodor Adorno describes expressionism as concerned with the unconscious, and states that "the depiction of fear lies at the centre" of expressionist music, with dissonance predominating, so that the "harmonious, affirmative element of art is banished" (Adorno 2009, 275–76). Erwartung and Die Glückliche Hand, by Schoenberg, and Wozzeck, an opera by Alban Berg (based on the play Woyzeck by Georg Büchner), are examples of Expressionist works. If one were to draw an analogy from paintings, one may describe the expressionist painting technique as the distortion of reality (mostly colors and shapes) to create a nightmarish effect for the particular painting as a whole. Expressionist music roughly does the same thing, where the dramatically increased dissonance creates, aurally, a nightmarish atmosphere.

=== Architecture ===
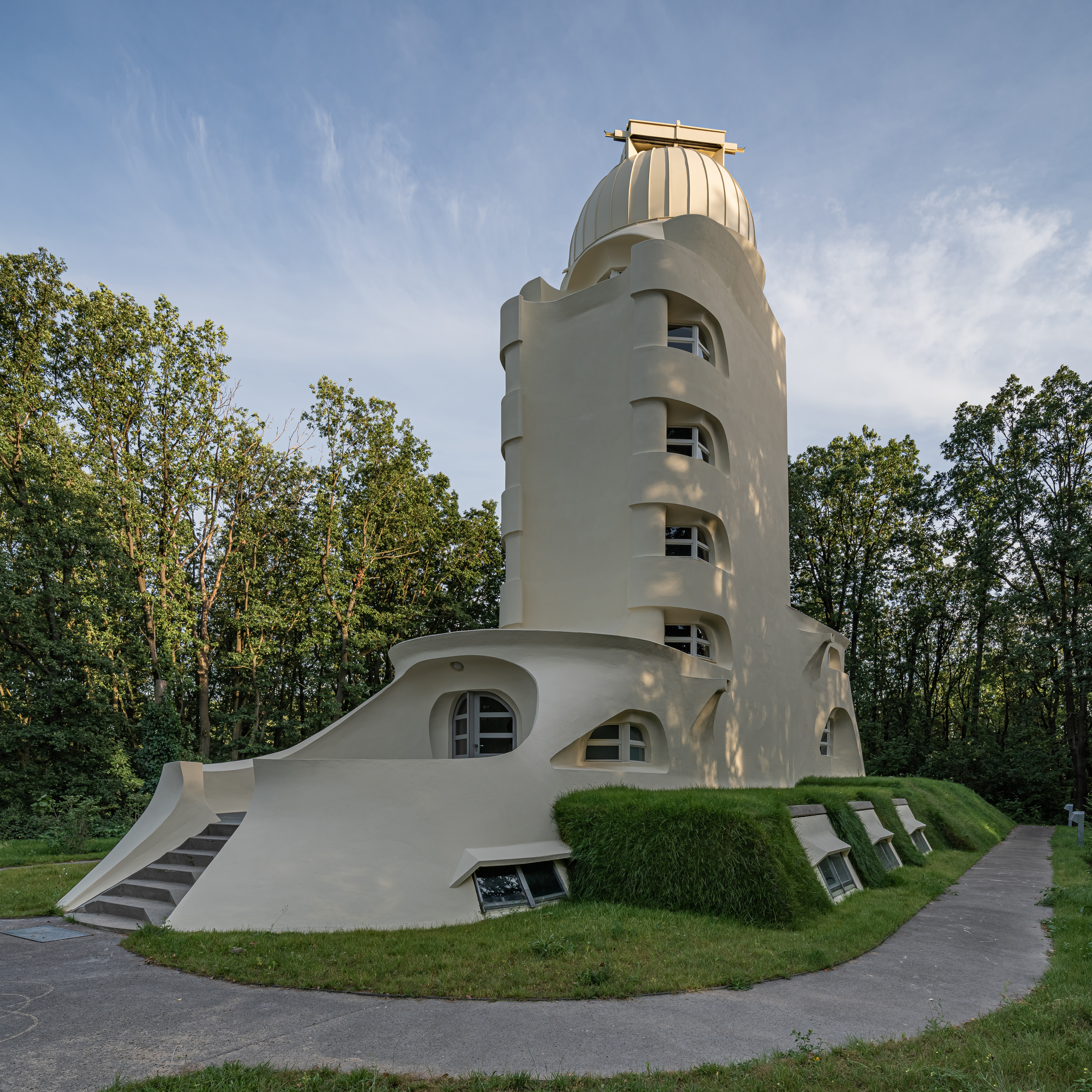
Einstein Tower in Potsdam

In architecture, two specific buildings are identified as Expressionist: Bruno Taut's Glass Pavilion of the Cologne Werkbund Exhibition (1914), and Erich Mendelsohn's Einstein Tower in Potsdam, Germany completed in 1921. The interior of Hans Poelzig's Berlin theatre (the Grosse Schauspielhaus), designed for the director Max Reinhardt, is also cited sometimes. The influential architectural critic and historian Sigfried Giedion, in his book Space, Time and Architecture (1941), dismissed Expressionist architecture as a part of the development of functionalism. In Mexico, in 1953, German émigré Mathias Goeritz published the Arquitectura Emocional ("Emotional Architecture") manifesto with which he declared that "architecture's principal function is emotion". Modern Mexican architect Luis Barragán adopted the term that influenced his work. The two of them collaborated in the project Torres de Satélite (1957–58) guided by Goeritz's principles of Arquitectura Emocional. It was only during the 1970s that Expressionism in architecture came to be re-evaluated more positively.

== See also ==
- Expressionism – 1916 book by Hermann Bahr
- New Objectivity – 1920s German art movement against expressionism
- Post-expressionism – Post-war art movement
- Western painting – Painting produced in the Western world
- History of painting
