= Adila, Estonia =

Village in Estonia

Adila
- Village
- Location within Estonia Location within Europe
- Coordinates: 59°06′N 24°38′E
- Country: Estonia
- County: Rapla County
- Parish: Kohila Parish
- Time zone: UTC+2 (EET)
  - Summer (DST): UTC+3 (EEST)

Adila (German: Addila) is a village in Kohila Parish, Rapla County in northwestern Estonia.

Painter and graphic artist Kuno Veeber (1898–1929) was born in Adila Manor, as was actress and singer Laine Mesikäpp (1917–2012).
