= Kuno Veeber =

Estonian painter (1898–1929)

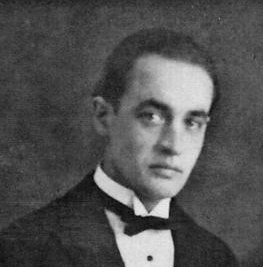
- Veeber, ca. 1926
- Born: Kuno Bernard Weber; 28 February 1898; Adila, Governorate of Estonia, Russian Empire
- Died: 1 January 1929 (aged 30); Tallinn, Estonia
- Movement: Constructivism, Cubism, Expressionism
- Spouse: Agaate Veeber (née Kanto) (1926–1929; his death)

Kuno Veeber (18 February 1898 – 1 January 1929) was an Estonian painter and graphic artist whose career began in the late 1910s.

== Early life ==
Kuno Veeber was born Kuno Bernard Weber at Adila manor, Hageri Parish (now part of Kohila Parish) to Konstantin Villibald Weber and Bertha Louise Weber (née Gildemann). He was the second eldest of six sons. The family later Estonianized the surname from 'Weber' to the more Estonian 'Veeber'. Kuno Veeber began his artistic studies at the Ants Laikmaa Studio School in Tallinn in 1916. After graduating from Tallinn Nikolai I Gymnasium in 1917, he briefly went on to study medical science at the University of Tartu. From 1919 until 1920, during the Estonian War of Independence, Veeber served as a cyclist in the Estonian Army. Following the war, he worked as a laborer on the construction of the new Estonian Parliament building (Riigikogu) on Toompea Hill in Tallinn.

== Further studies and travel abroad ==
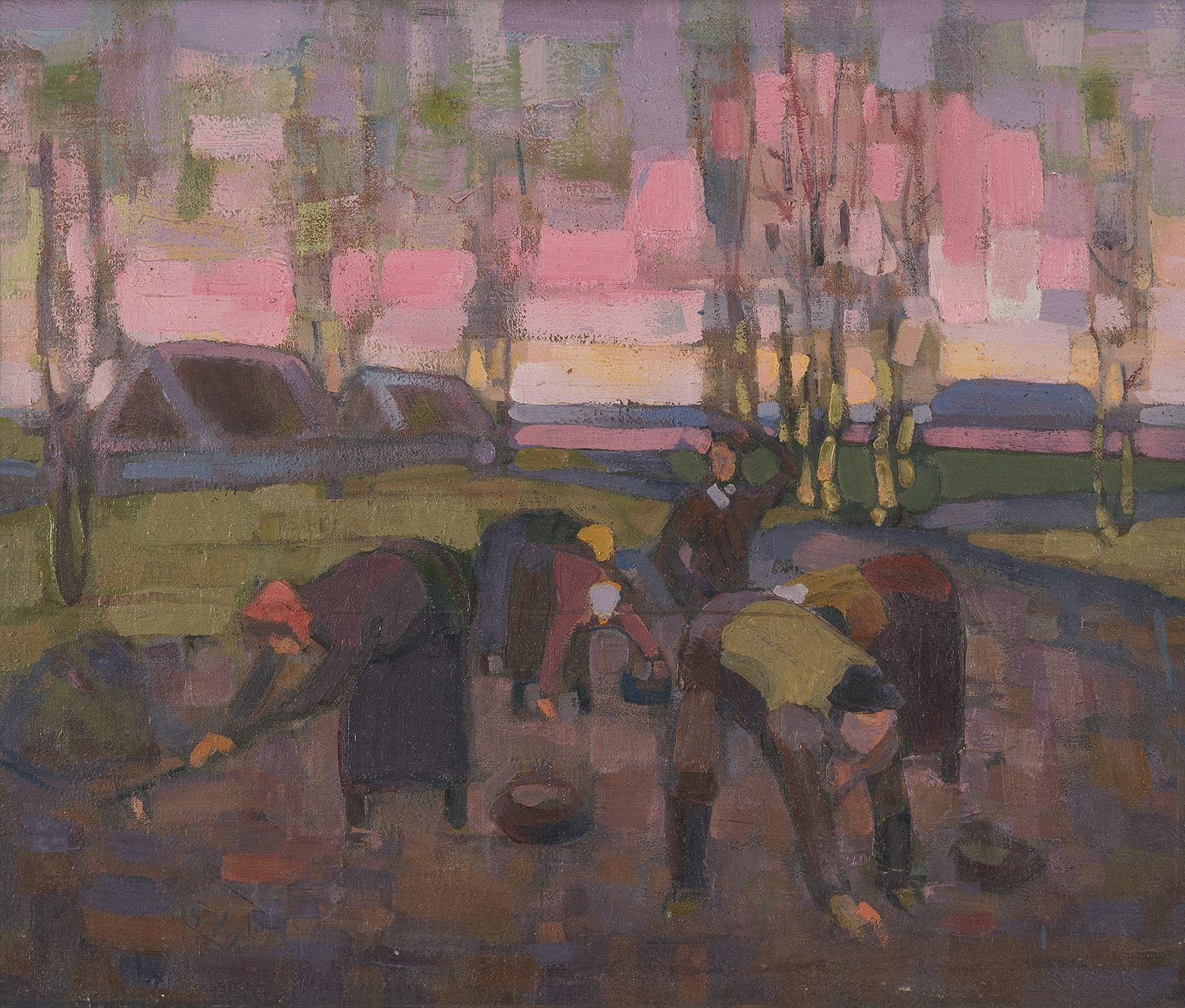
Kartulivõtjad ("Potato Harvest"). Oil on canvas, 1918.

After studying with Ants Laikmaa, Veeber studied with graphic artist Nikolai Triik and sculptor Jaan Koort. His earlier works show clear signs of Constructivist and Cubist influences. In 1922, he entered the Higher Art School Pallas in Tartu, studying painting at artist Konrad Mägi's painting studio and graphic art techniques with German Expressionist painter and graphic artist Magnus Zeller. In 1923, he traveled with Zeller to Germany, where Veeber became more acquainted with German Expressionism. In spite of poor health, Veeber graduated from the Higher Art School Pallas in 1924. In October of the same year, Veeber went to Paris and remained there until 1926.

In France, he became part of the School of Paris, and studied under painter André Lhote and the Greek artist Demetrios Galanis in Montparnasse and explored old graphic techniques in the exhibition halls of the National Library of France. Veeber's art of the period was marked by a struggle for clear form and harmonious balanced image structure and he became a strong admirer of Post-Impressionist Paul Cézanne. In 1927, Veeber traveled to Italy with his wife Agaate with a grant from the Estonian Cultural Endowment Fine Arts Foundation to copy works by the Old Masters. In Venice, he visited the Sala di Anticollegio at the Doge's Palace and copied Tintoretto's Mercury and the Three Graces, which is approximately one-fifth smaller than the original. The copy was exhibited in Estonia in the autumn of 1927 and is currently in the collection of the Tartu Art Museum. During his life, Veeber's works were exhibited outside of Estonia by the Société des Artistes Indépendants in Paris, and at exhibitions in Riga, Kaunas, Helsinki, Cologne, Copenhagen, Moscow, Rome, and Budapest.

== Death ==
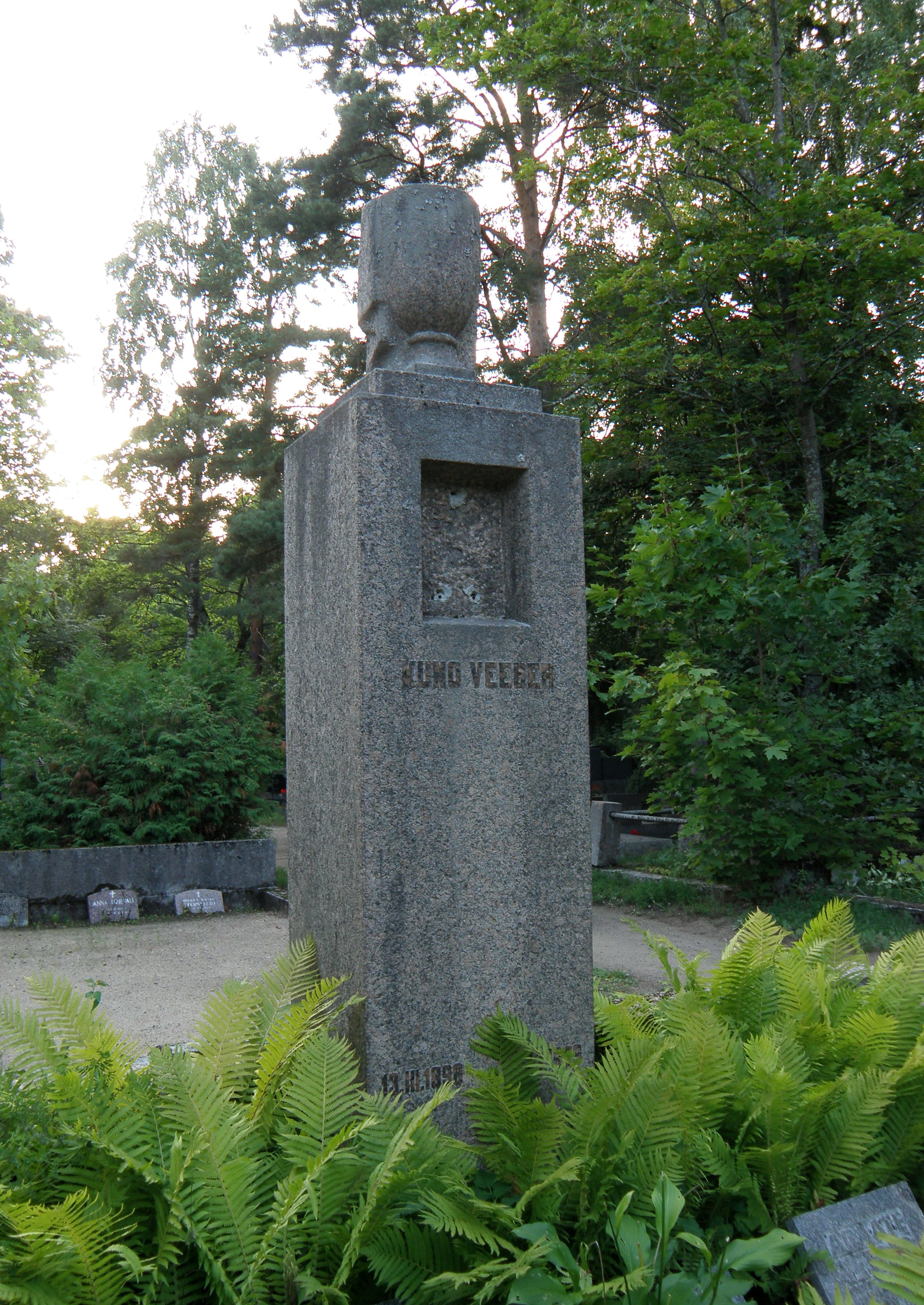
Kuno Veeber's headstone at Rahumäe cemetery.

After returning to Tallinn, Veeber committed suicide on 1 January 1929 at age thirty. He was buried at Rahumäe cemetery in the Nõmme district of Tallinn. His granite headstone was created by Veeber's former instructor, sculptor Jaan Koort.

== Personal life ==
Kuno Veeber was married to Estonian graphic artist Agaate Veeber (née Kanto) in 1926. Agaate later found a measure of success in Estonia after her husband's death, as well as in the United States after immigrating to New York in the 1940s and adopting the name Agathe Veeber.

== Legacy ==
Since Veeber's death, his work has been exhibited throughout Estonia and works by Veeber are in a number of Estonian art museum collections, including the Kumu in Tallinn.

== Gallery ==
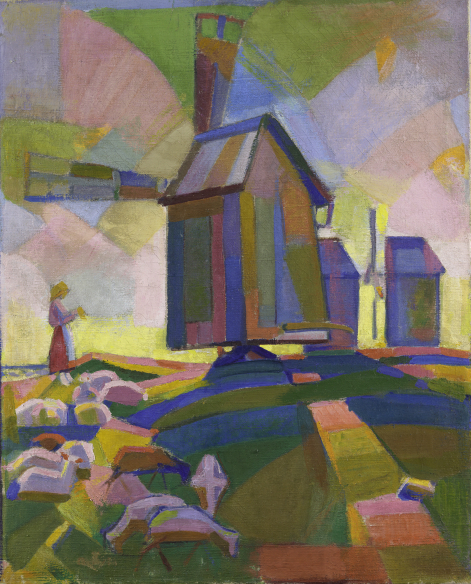
Tuulikud (1918–1919)

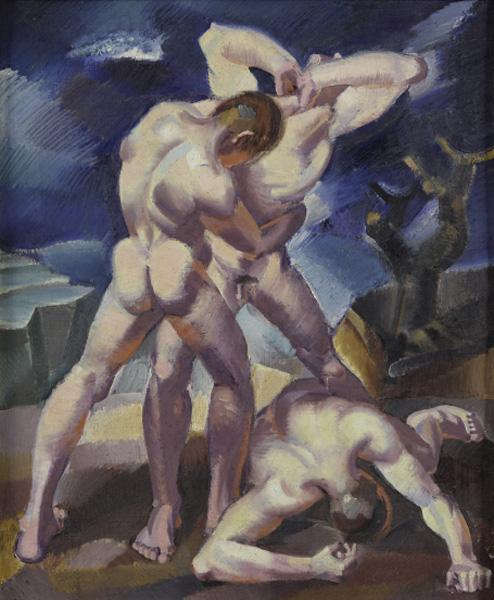
Võitlejad (1923)

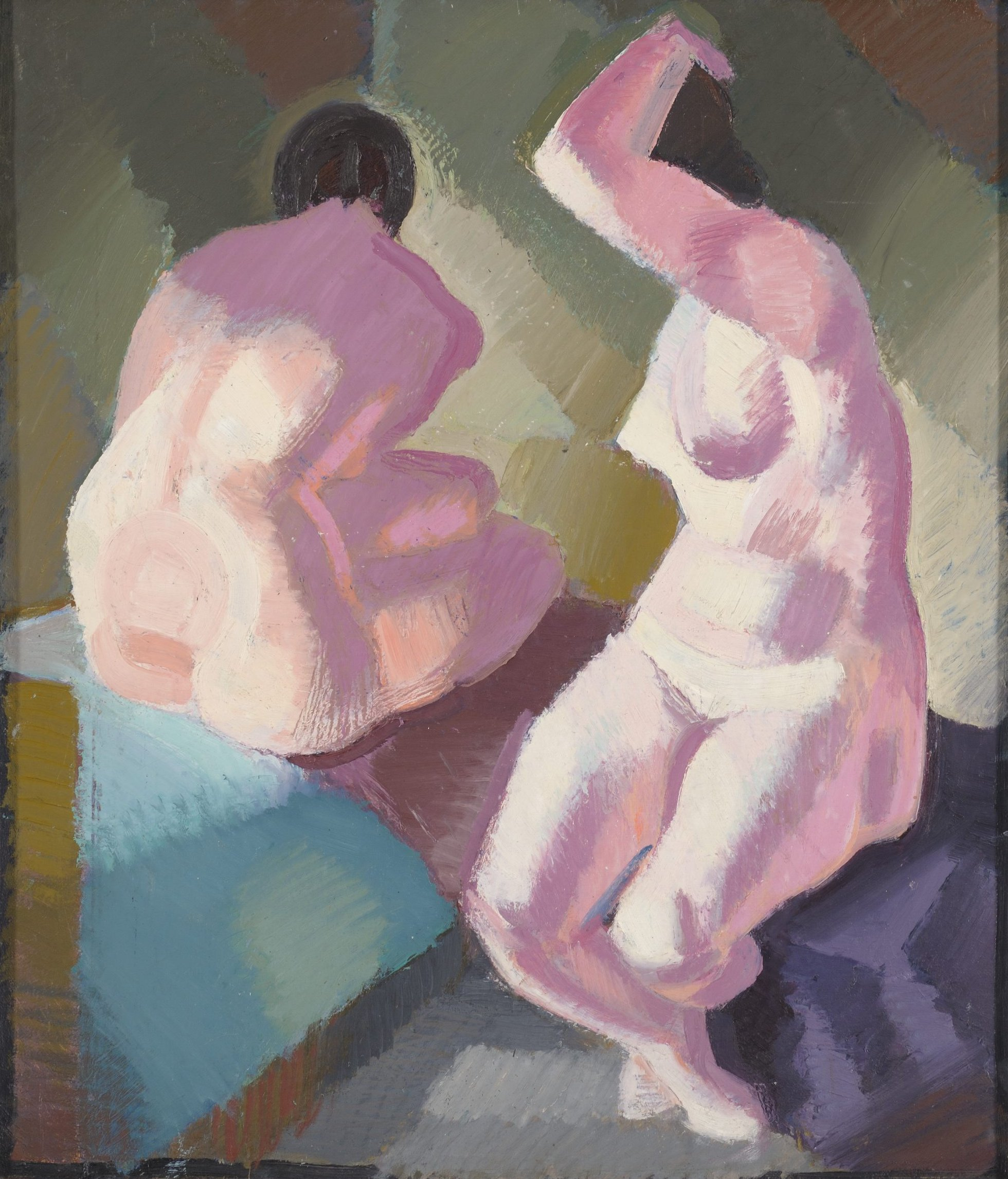
Tualett (1924)

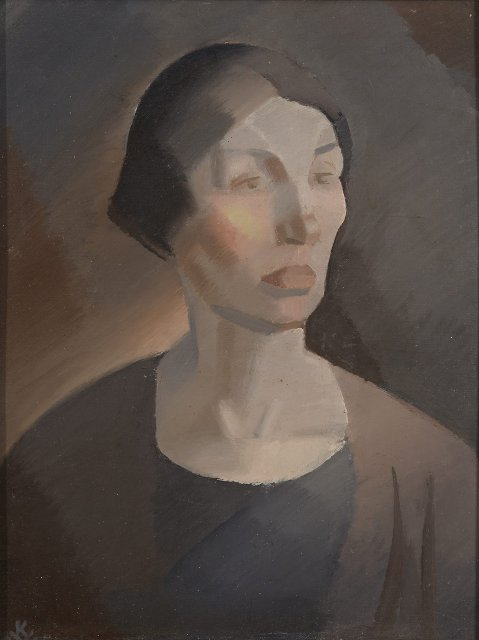
Portree (1925)

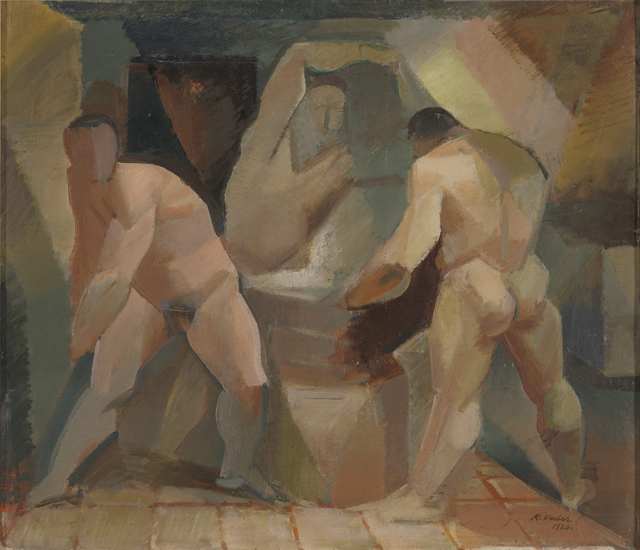
Sepad (1926)

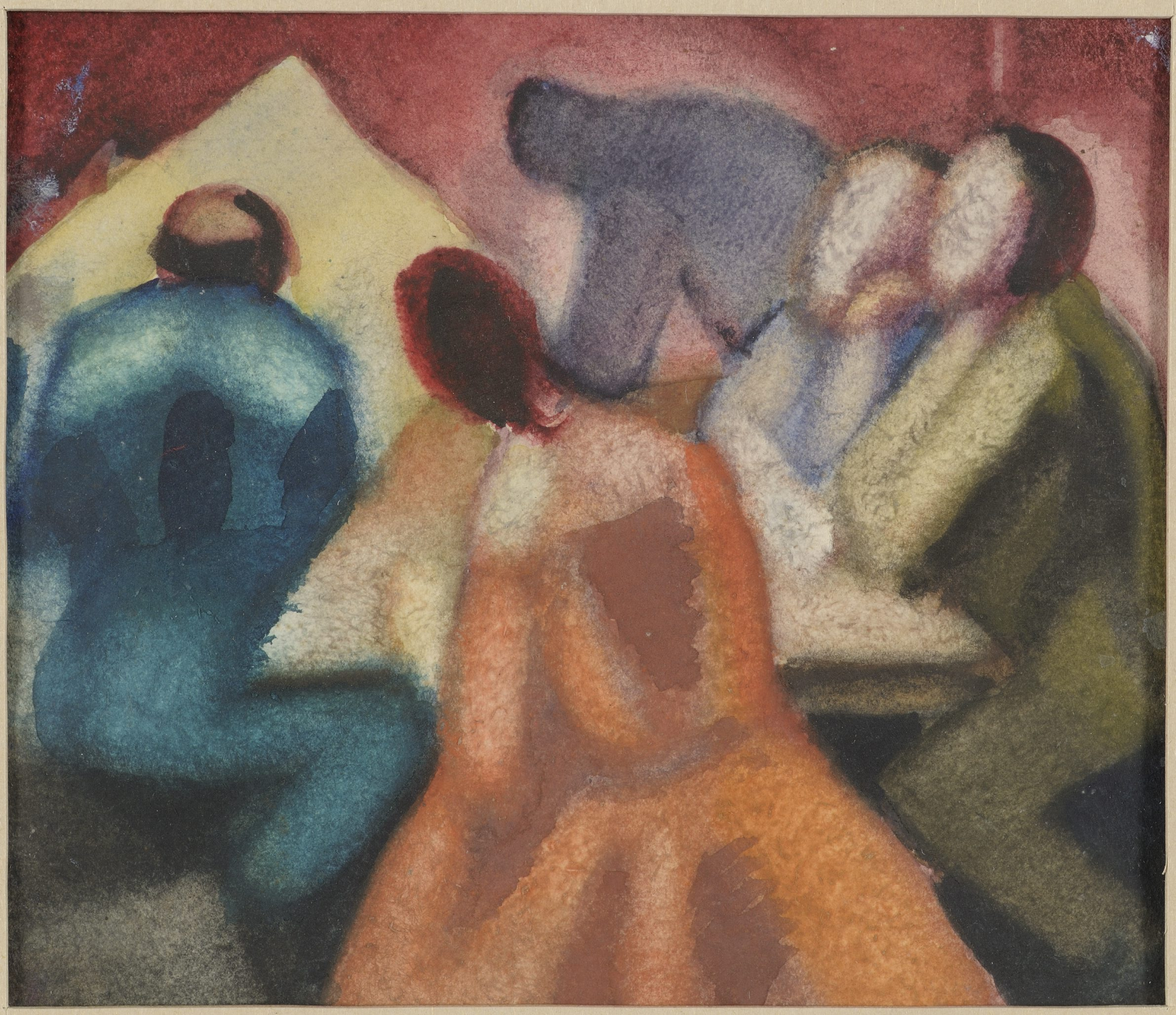
Kompositsioon (undated)

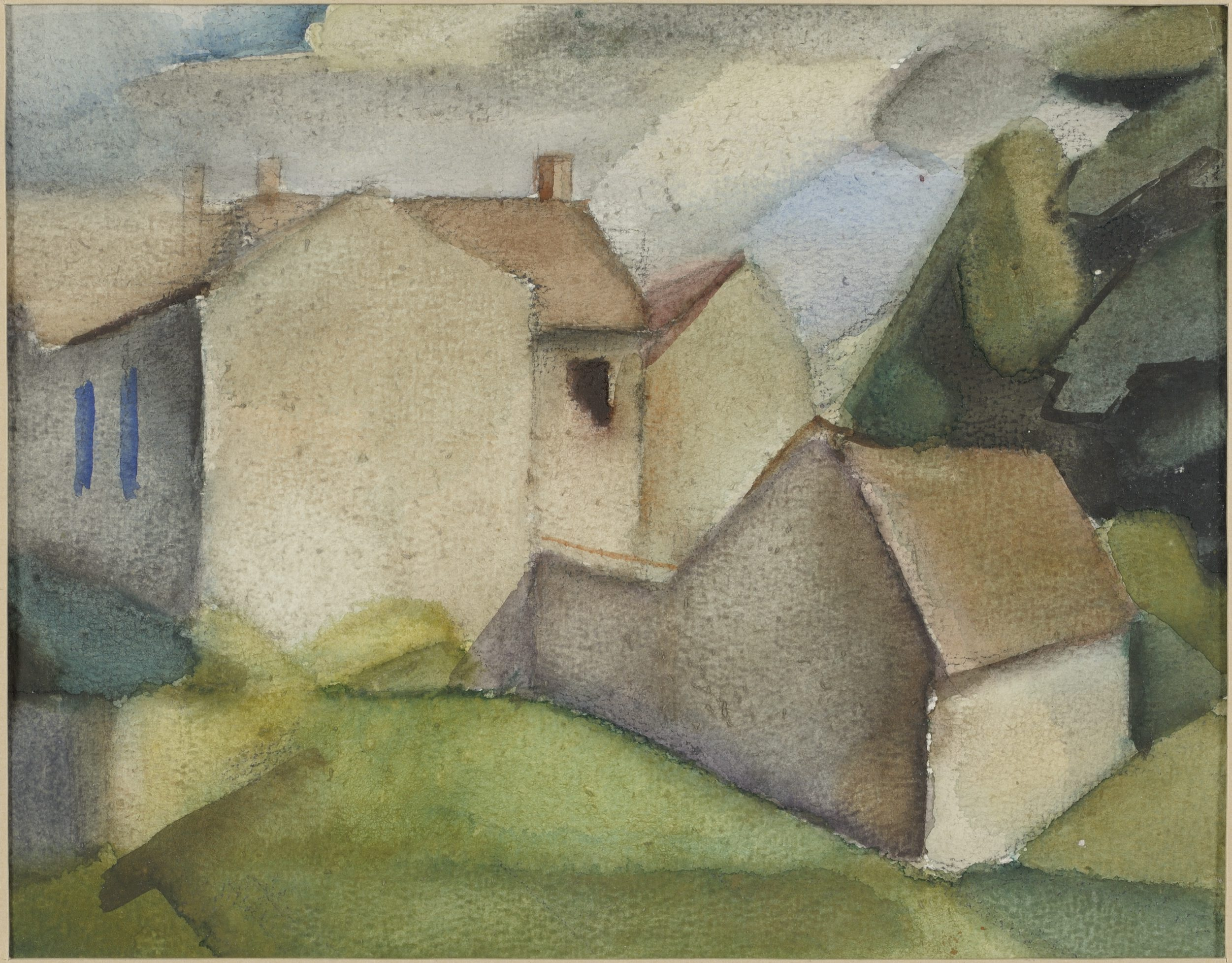
Majad (undated)
