= Agaate Veeber =

Estonian artist

- Born: Agaate Wilhelmine Kanto; 23 February 1901; Tallinn, Governorate of Estonia, Russian Empire
- Died: 8 April 1988 (aged 87); New York City, United States
- Other names: Agathe Veeber; Agate Veeber
- Known for: Graphic arts
- Spouse: Kuno Veeber (1926–1929; his death)

Agaate Veeber (also known as Agathe Veeber, born Agaate Wilhelmine Kanto; 23 February 1901 – 8 April 1988) was an Estonian graphic artist and illustrator who began her career in the 1920s in her native country of Estonia and continued in the United States after immigrating in 1948.

== Early life and education ==
Agaate Veeber was born Agaate Wilhelmine Kanto in Tallinn to Karel and Ann Kanto (née Leesment). She had one sister, Auguste Henriette, born in 1899. She attended secondary school at the Tallinn City I Girls' Gymnasium and began her artistic studies at Ants Laikmaa's Studio School in Tallinn, initially studying painting. In the late 1920s, she spent two semesters at the Academy of Fine Arts, Nuremberg in Germany, studying applied arts before returning to Estonia and enrolling at the Estonian Academy of Arts. In 1933, she entered the Pallas Art School in Tartu, studying graphic art and etching with Ado Vabbe and graphic art with Hando Mugasto, Arkadio Laigo and Roman Vaher. In 1934, she began studying at artist Nikolai Triik's studio, graduating in 1938 with a degree in graphic art.

== Career ==
=== In Estonia ===
Agaate Veeber's first public exhibition was in 1926 at Tallinn's Harjumäe Park Pavilion. By the mid-1920s, she had largely abandoned painting and concentrated on graphic art: drawing, and printmaking in mezzotint, drypoint, aquatint, woodcutting, and monotyping. In 1927, she accompanied her husband, painter Kuno Veeber, to Venice on a grant he received from the Estonian Cultural Endowment Fine Arts Foundation to copy works by the Old Masters.

Veeber had a number of exhibitions throughout the 1930s in Estonia, as well as in Rome, Antwerp, and Budapest. Early graphic pieces from Veeber include portraits, monuments, and cityscapes (several drawings and prints of Tallinn's St. Nicholas' Church) in peaceful and meditative black and white tones. In 1939, she also began illustrating books, including an edition of early Baltic German writer Count Peter August Friedrich von Mannteuffel's 1838 Estonian language book Aiawite peergo walguse, and from 1940 until 1941, worked as an illustrator for several Tallinn newspapers.

=== World War II and the United States ===
Following the Soviet occupation and annexation of Estonia in 1944 during World War II, Agaate Veeber fled as a war refugee, first to Vienna, where she completed courses at the Institute of Graphic Arts, Academy of Fine Arts Vienna on a scholarship in 1944. Afterwards, she lived in a number of displaced persons camps in Germany, including Geislingen DP Camp, from where she was able to immigrate to the United States, arriving in New York City in 1948. Following her arrival in the United States she often used and was credited by the name Agathe Veeber.

Shortly after arriving in the United States, Veeber illustrated the first edition of Estonian author and fellow exile Henrik Visnapuu's 1948 novel Mare Balticum. The following year, she illustrated the published poetry compilation of Juhan Liiv's Valitud luuletused. Veeber's oeuvre while in exile in the U.S. became more stark; the black and white prints were often more rough and jarring than her prior work in Estonia and explored nature motifs, harbor cities and animals. In 1964 and 1965, she illustrated Henrik Visnapuu's collection of two volumes of poems Kogutud luuletused I–II and in 1968, she illustrated exiled Estonian poet Marie Under's collection of poems Porkuni preili. Veeber also continued to exhibit throughout her life, with personal exhibitions at the Columbus Museum of Art (1960); the Estonian House in New York (1961, with Arno Vihalemm); the Peetri Church Hall of Toronto (1963, with Endel Kõks), and the Art Museum of Estonia at Kadriorg Palace (1984). Exhibitions of Veeber's work after her death have been held at the Art Museum of Estonia at the Adamson-Eric Museum (2002) and the Art Museum of Estonia at the Kumu (2018). Veeber was a member of American Graphic Artists Association (SAGA).

The Art Museum of Estonia currently holds more than 600 works of art by Agaate Veeber. Other institutions in possession of works by Veeber include the Metropolitan Museum of Art in New York, the Brooklyn Museum, The New York Public Library Print Collection, the Cincinnati Museum of Art, and the Albright–Knox Art Gallery in Buffalo.

== Personal life and death ==
Agaate Kanto married painter Kuno Veeber in 1926. The couple had no children and Kuno Veeber committed suicide in Tallinn in 1929. She never remarried and lived in New York from 1948 until her death at age 87 in 1988. On 26 August 1989 she was interred next to her husband at Rahumäe cemetery in the Nõmme district of Tallinn.
