= Hendra Gunawan =

Hendra Gunawan may refer to:

- Hendra Aprida Gunawan (born 1982), Indonesian badminton player
- Hendra Gunawan (painter) (1918–1983), Indonesian painter
- Hendra Gunawan (magician), Indonesian magician
