= Laine Mesikäpp =

Estonian actress (1917–2012)

- Born: 27 February 1917; Adila, Governorate of Estonia, Russian Empire
- Died: 5 May 2012 (aged 95); Iru, Harju County, Estonia
- Other name: Laine Koppel
- Occupations: Actress, singer, folk song collector
- Years active: 1938–1994
- Spouse: Karl Koppel

Laine Mesikäpp (27 February 1917 – 5 May 2012) was an Estonian film, radio and stage actress, singer, and prolific collector and cataloguer of Estonian folk music.

== Early life and education ==
Laine Mesikäpp was born in the small village of Adila in Kohila Parish, Rapla County, to Hans Mesikäpp Jr. and Ann Mesikäpp (née Rammus) and grew up on a farm in the small neighboring borough of Hageri. She was the youngest of nine children. Her interest in traditional Estonian folklore and Estonian folk music began early in her childhood; her father Hans was a locally known storyteller and singer who always kept a pencil in his pocket to transcribe all local traditions, songs and stories. Later, the family home became a gathering place for folklorists, musicians and singers from all parts of Estonia, which left a lasting impression on her and added numerous songs from other regions to her repertoire.

Beginning in 1932, she studied at Tallinn 1st Girls' Gymnasium, graduating in 1936.

== Stage career ==
In 1942, Laine Mesikäpp was invited to join the Endla Theatre in Pärnu by theatre director Riivo Kuljus after he watched her perform as a singer. Although she had no formal training as an actress, she agreed. She made her stage debut later that year in the role of Maret Vaa in a production of August Gailit's 1928 novel Toomas Nipernaadi. She would remain at the Endla theatre until 1944 when she joined the Estonian National Opera musical theater. After leaving the Estonian National Opera musical theatre in 1949, she would join the Estonian Drama Theatre, which would be her longest theatre engagement, lasting 43 years; from 1949 until 1992. Among her more notable roles at the Estonian Drama Theatre were Natasha in Anton Chekhov's Three Sisters, Berta in Oskar Luts' Tagahoovis, Mardi-Riste in Juhan Smuul's Muhu Monoloogides and Emma in Bertholt Brecht's Mr Puntila and his Man Matti.

== Film ==
Laine Mesikäpp's feature film debut was in the 1956 film adaptation of Oskar Luts' 1933 story Tagahoovis, directed by Viktor Nevežin. Mesikäpp reprised her role of Berta for the film; a role she had played previously onstage as an actress at the Estonian Drama Theatre. This was followed by small roles in the 1960 Herbert Rappaport directed drama Vihmas ja päikeses for Tallinna Kinostuudio and the 1962 musical comedy color film Laulu sõber directed by Ilja Fogelman and Reet Kasesalu, also for Tallinna Kinostuudio.

Other film appearances include roles in the 1968 film adaptation of August Kitzberg's novel Libahunt; the 1981 Arvo Kruusement directed Karge meri, based on the 1938 novel of the same name; and as Aunt Kaie in the 1989 Leida Laius directed drama Varastatud kohtumine. All of which were produced by Tallinnfilm. Mesikäpp's final film appearance would be an uncredited role in Pekka Karjalainen directed black and white comedy Hysteria in 1993.

== Folk songs ==
From a very early age, Laine Mesikäpp had a strong interest in traditional Estonian music, songs, dance, stories and national dress. She began collecting and performing folk songs from all over Estonia while still a teenager. In 1947, Estonia held its first Estonian Song Festival since the Soviet annexation in 1944 and Mesikäpp performed. When the choir, and subsequently the audience, began singing the patriotic "Mu isamaa on minu arm" ("My Fatherland is My Love") in a burst of Estonian patriotism and in defiance of Soviet rule, the crowd roared with approval, outraging Soviet authorities. This event sparked Mesikäpp to begin organizing parties and festivals promoting traditional Estonian folk music and dance. Although not an overtly political statement, it was, in part, an attempt to preserve Estonian customs and an attempt to halt russification.

Mesikäpp remained active in the collection and promotion Estonian folk music throughout her life. She was a member of the Leigarid Folk Art Ensemble; a folk art collective founded in 1969 which promoted Estonian culture through music and dance.

== Personal life ==
Laine Mesikäpp was married to Karl Koppel, who died in 1988. In her later years, she was a resident at an assisted living facility for the elderly in Iru in Harju County, where she died in 2012 at age 95.
