= Wolfgang Wolff =

German-born painter and textile designer (1909–1994)

Portrait of Wolfgang Wolff wearing a straw hat, Tahiti, circa 1937.

Wolfgang Wolff (1909–1994) was a German-born, self-taught artist and textile designer whose work included painting, drawing, printmaking, and commercial textile design. His oeuvre reflects influences of German Expressionism and New Objectivity. It also documents social and cultural conditions in Germany, the United States, and particularly in Tahiti (French Polynesia), where he lived in exile from 1934 to 1948.

== Early life and education ==
Wolff was born in 1909 in Saint-Louis, Alsace (then part of the German Empire). After World War I, his family settled in Zierenberg, Hesse, where his father, Kurt Wolff, served as a local court judge.

Considered too young for formal art school training (aged fifteen), Wolff pursued independent artistic study in oil painting, watercolor, woodcut, and etching. His early subjects included landscapes, animals, and scenes from the rural surroundings of his youth.

He studied law at the University of Marburg, where he was a member of the student fraternity Rheinfranken, and later at the Goethe University Frankfurt. During his student days, Wolff continued to draw and paint and left murals in Marburg's campus detention room (Karzer), a practice documented in later historical accounts of the detention room. The room, with its murals, is preserved intact by the university.

After completing his law studies and passing the first state examination, Wolff served at the Higher Regional Court in Frankfurt am Main as part of his judicial traineeship (Referendariat).

== Artistic context in Germany ==
Wolff's work of the late 1920s and early 1930s shows the influence of New Objectivity, an art movement associated with the Weimar Republic. His drawings and paintings from this period depict everyday life and social conditions in postwar Germany, aligning with contemporary realist and socially critical tendencies.

In 1933, two of his works, which received prizes in oil painting and watercolor, were exhibited at the Frankfurter Kunstverein as part of a competition organized by the Frankfurter Künstlergesellschaft (Frankfurt Artists' Association).

Following the Nazi seizure of power in 1933, Wolff was confronted by increasing political pressure. This affected his judicial career through measures such as the Enabling Act of 1933 and the Law for the Restoration of the Professional Civil Service, and his artistic ambitions through restrictions on artistic expression imposed by the Reich Chamber of Culture. Rather than comply with these requirements, he chose to leave Germany.

== Exile in Tahiti ==
Although German citizens classified as "Aryan" were permitted to leave the German Reich for travel abroad, they were expected to return. Wolff and his partner Hildegard used their marriage as a means of departure, officially declaring a honeymoon trip while intending not to return. They left Germany in 1934, traveling via Marseille and Martinique to Papeete, Tahiti. Their initial plan to establish a vanilla plantation in the Society Islands was rejected by French authorities.

With the plantation plans abandoned, Wolff devoted himself entirely to professional artistic work. In the new Polynesian environment, Wolff's artistic style shifted toward German Expressionism, characterized by bold colors, strong outlines, and expressive, often stylized human figures. His paintings and drawings depict daily life, revealing the economic hardship of colonial realities in Tahiti that contrast with the idealized European images of the islands.

His first major exhibition in Papeete took place in 1935 and was followed by official recognition, including the Grand Prize of Honor awarded by the government of French Polynesia at a national trade exhibition. Tourists purchased his artwork and exhibited their collections internationally at locations such as the Santa Barbara Museum of Art, as well as in galleries in Sydney, Melbourne, Buenos Aires, New York, Detroit, and several other U.S. cities.

In 1939, Wolff was contracted to provide extensive illustrations for the book I Went Native in Tahiti by Al Kassel. The book and its illustrations received favorable coverage in The New York Times.

=== World War II internment ===
During the entirety of World War II, Wolff was interned by French authorities due to his German citizenship. He was initially held at Fort Taravao and a year later transferred to Motu Uta in the harbor of Papeete. Conditions at Motu Uta were austere, and internees were required to construct their own shelter and had to rely on authorities to provide water and limited rations.

While interned, Wolff created an extensive illustrated diary documenting daily life in captivity, which constitutes a rare visual record of civilian internment in French Polynesia. Despite limited materials and tools, he continued to paint and produce graphic works. Some pieces of this period are included in the so-called "Collection of the Guardian of Motu Uta". Wolff also fabricated jewellery from mother-of-pearl, the sale of which helped support his family.

== United States and textile design ==
In 1948, Wolff and his family relocated to Los Angeles. He continued to exhibit paintings but increasingly focused on commercial textile design.

Wolff became associated with the development of Polynesian-inspired textile patterns in the United States, particularly the decorative back-border designs used in Hawaiian shirts. His work is discussed in studies of mid-20th-century American fashion. Photographs of Wolff's textile designs were published in Time magazine in 1985.

== Later life and legacy ==
Wolff continued painting into his eighties and participated in several later exhibitions, including shows in Tahiti and Los Angeles. His work was also used as the cover artwork for the album The Parish Notices by Jez Lowe and the Bad Pennies.

His textile designs remain collectible and are referenced in fashion history literature. His illustrated diaries and correspondence are cited as historical sources on colonial society in Tahiti, wartime internment, and the experience of exile artists. Among his correspondents were the journalist Ida Treat Bergeret and the art collector couple Walter Conrad Arensberg and Louise Arensberg. These correspondences are preserved in the respective archival collections: in the Arensberg Archive at the Philadelphia Museum of Art Research Library, and correspondence with Treat Bergeret in the Vassar College Digital Library.

== Selected exhibitions ==
- 1933 – Frankfurt am Main, Germany: Frankfurter Kunstverein; two prize-winning works exhibited
- 1937 – Buenos Aires, Argentina: Galería Müller
- 1937 – Detroit, Michigan, United States: Hudson Gallery
- 1938 – Sydney, Australia: Roycroft Book & Art Shop
- 1938 – Indianapolis, Indiana, United States: Lyman Brothers Art Gallery
- 1939 – New York City, United States: Morton Gallery
- 1944 – San Francisco, California, United States: Gump's
- 1946 – Santa Barbara, California, United States: Santa Barbara Museum of Art
- 1986 – Taravao, Tahiti: Musée Paul Gauguin
- 1992 – Los Angeles, California, United States: COMA Gallery Space, California State University
- 2013 – Papeete, Tahiti: Musée de Tahiti et des Îles, Après Gauguin
- 2026 – Papeete, Tahiti: Galerie Au Chevalet, Hommage à Wolfgang Wolff – un artiste à Tahiti

== Selected literature ==
- Kassel, Al. I Went Native in Tahiti. Illustrated by Wolfgang Wolff. Richard R. Smith, New York, 1939.
- "Brush Strokes: Wolfgang Wolff." Los Angeles Times, October 17, 1948, p. 90.
- "High, Wide and Hawaiian." Time, June 3, 1985, p. 88. Includes photographs of Wolff's textile designs.
- Hope, Dale. The Aloha Shirt: Spirit of the Islands. Patagonia Press, Ventura, California, 2000, pp. 347–349.
- Nail, Norbert. "Vom ‚Karzer-Maler' zum Malkünstler." Studenten-Kurier, no. 4, 2020, pp. 24–28. Online version.
- O'Reilly, Patrick; Raoul Teissier. Tahitiens: Répertoire biographique de la Polynésie française, 1975, p. 607 (entry on Wolff).
