= Hendra Gunawan (magician) =

Indonesian magician

Hendra Gunawan is an Indonesian magician. Also known as Hendramagic, he is a member of the Society of Indonesian Magicians. Now He Changes Name with Shoyu Katana.

He developed his knowledge of magic in Jakarta and after performing three days of magic shows with Alford the Magician, Indonesia's top illusionist, he resolved to make a career in the profession. He studied under Mr. Lee, Uncle Tan and Dui Montero. He began performing in his local church and gradually received bookings for shows at malls, hotels and corporate events. Aside from performing he is also an inventor of innovative magic boxes which have received orders from as far away as the United States and Serbia.
