= Norris Embry =

American artist (1921–1981)

- Born: January 14, 1921; Louisville, Kentucky, U.S.
- Died: February 17, 1981 (aged 60); Louisville, Kentucky, U.S.
- Resting place: Cave Hill Cemetery
- Known for: Painting
- Movement: Neo-expressionism
- Website: www.norrisembry.com

Norris Embry (January 14, 1921 – February 17, 1981) was an American artist associated with Neo-Expressionism, Art Brut and Outsider Art.

== Life ==
Norris Embry was born in Louisville, Kentucky. He grew up in East Orange, New Jersey outside New York City and Evanston, Illinois in the Chicago area, attending public schools through high school. Later, he studied at St. John's College in Annapolis, Maryland and the Art Institute in Chicago. In the late 1940s, he attended the Academy of Fine Arts in Florence, Italy; his teacher, the expressionist painter Oskar Kokoschka, was to have a lasting influence on Embry's work.

During his adolescent years in the Chicago area, Embry developed a keen interest in avant-garde literature, music and art. In 1947 Embry decided to devote his life to painting and, for the next 15 years until the early 1960s, embarked on a nomadic artistic career which would take him from San Francisco to New York, to post-war Europe, as well as Turkey and North Africa.

Amongst the countries in Europe where he took up temporary residence were Italy, France, Germany, Spain, England and Sweden. Embry had his first Solo Exhibition in Europe at the Heinz Trökes Atelier in Berlin in 1950. It was in Berlin that Embry was part of the Artist Cabaret Die Quallenpeitsche with whom he performed. It was the Mediterranean culture and climate that struck a chord with his heart and his artistic imagination, and in particular, Greece where he returned frequently.

Throughout much of his life, Embry suffered from severe bouts of mental illness. In the mid-1960s, after having sought medical treatment at the Shepphard Pratt Institute in Baltimore, Maryland, he made that city his permanent residence. He continued to live and paint in Baltimore until the last weeks of his life.

After a series of strokes, he died on February 17, 1981, in Louisville. He was buried at Cave Hill Cemetery in Louisville.

== Work ==
Norris Embry's work stands outside both conventional and commercial appreciation, although he has been referred to as the first American German Expressionist.

Amongst the painters he acknowledged as being a great influence (apart from his teacher Kokoschka) were: Jean Dubuffet, Paul Klee, Joan Miró, Jackson Pollock, Emil Nolde, Max Beckmann, Ernst Ludwig Kirchner, Egon Schiele, Georges Rouault and Wols. Another unexpected influence, the writer and illustrator James Thurber, can be seen particularly in Embry's whimsical cartoon-like monotypes that he produced throughout his career. The graffiti that fills much of his work records autobiographical details of his Life.

From the late 1950s until his death, Embry's work was exhibited regularly in New York and other cities in the United States and Europe.

== Public collections ==
- Baltimore Museum of Art, Baltimore, MD
- Hirshhorn Museum, Washington, D.C.
- Neuberger Museum of Art, Purchase, NY
- Solomon R. Guggenheim Museum, New York, NY
- Speed Art Museum, Louisville, KY
- The Arkansas Arts Center, Little Rock, AR
- The Newark Museum, Newark, NY
- University of Kentucky Art Museum, Lexington, KY
