= Bad Girrls Studios =

Coordinates: 42.3095°N 71.1049°W

Bad Girrls Studios was a popular gallery and performance space in Boston, Massachusetts, United States, from 1994 to 2006 initially located at 59 Amory Street and later moved to 209 Green Street in Jamaica Plain. Founded by School of the Museum of Fine Arts student Jessica Brand, the artist-run studio hosted numerous artistic and community events. Bad Girrls Studios operated under the slogan "Art is Not A Luxury."

Bad Girrls Studios supported female artists in particular, and art that addressed the politics of sexuality and pushed boundaries of sexual orientation and gender identity. Bad Girrls Studios and Eventworks co-sponsored a 1999 production held at Massachusetts College of Art & Design featuring Karen Finley, an American performance artist, musician and poet famous for her works confronting the degradation of women and sexual violence. Opening acts for Karen Finley's performance "Shut up and Love me" included movement artist Emily Dotton and female musical duo Bitch and Animal.

Other noteworthy events and exhibits included "Naughty Girrls Nite @ Bad Girrls Studios", produced by studio member Rebecca Goldberg, which drew over 50 women artists and performers from New York and New England; "Love, Sex and Disappointment", an annual Valentine's Day spoken word event; and the "Post-Apocalyptic Carnival" an audience immersed installation performance series representing the art, culture and food of an imaginary future world re-emerging after an apocalyptic event.

Several of the studio members were part of the Art School Cheerleaders troop. This performance art group, which began at the School of the Museum of Fine Arts, used Cheerleading as a medium for satirical commentary about the art world and to advocate for arts funding.

Bad Girrls Studios hosted workshops and organized community gatherings to discuss the arts. Inspired by Jessica Brand's participation in the National Association of Artists' Organizations' (NAAO) "Co-Generate Project" (1999-2000), a think tank style leadership and development research initiative for arts professionals under the age of thirty (funded by the National Endowment for the Arts & Rockefeller Foundation), Bad Girrls Studios hosted a gathering of emerging Boston-based arts professionals and organizers working in dance, writing, theatre, music and visual art. The group engaged in dialogue and documented their perspectives of art's relationship to current social concerns, the 'alternative arts' model, empowering artist's access to visibility, and the future of art aesthetics. In 1999, the studio opened its doors to local Boston youth as part of an after-school arts drop-in center in which children engaged in imaginative drawing and painting.

Jessica Brand derived her inspiration to establish the non-profit artist run gallery from the passion and work produced by her aunt Alida Walsh (1933-2000), a New York City artist, educator and activist who worked in film, sculpture, and multi-media most active in the 1960s and 1970s. Bad Girrls Studios was also influenced by an important performance art space in Boston during that time, Mobius Artists Group, that brought cutting-edge performance artists to Boston through an international exchange program. Mobius had been founded by another member of the School of the Museum of Fine Arts community, instructor Marilyn Arsem.

Some notable artists as well as studio members working in visual, media & performance art included Justin Lieberman, Dana Moser, Jeff Warmouth, Yoriko Shiraishi, Joan Pamboukes, Sister Spit, Jake the Puppet Master, Duncan Wilder Johnson, Dame Darcey and the Cha Cha Caberet.

Bad Girrls Studios invited touring and local musical acts to produce events of musical genres ranging from jazz, opera, sound art, alternative rock, blue-grass, roots, mamba, punk rock and hardcore. Some notable musicians that performed at Bad Girrls Studios include: Saturnalia String Trio, Daniel Carter, Nmperign, Miracle Orchestra, Mamashoe, Babaloo, Marc Chillemi, Jossie Perez, Kaffe Mathews, Bonfire Madigan, Jessica Ryan, Mr. Airplane Man, Lars Vegas and Lightning Bolt.

Other important arts-focused organizations located in Boston's Jamaica Plain's neighborhood during the 1990s include the Jamaica Plain Firehouse Arts Center, The Footlight Club, The Elliot School of Fire & Applied Arts, The Boston Photo Collaborative, Spontaneous Celebrations, Jamaica Plain Arts Council, and Green Street Gallery.
