= Omar Hassan (artist) =

Italian artist (born 1987)

- Born: 11 March 1987 (age 39); Milan, Italy
- Education: Brera Academy
- Known for: Contemporary art, street art
- Website: omarhassan.art

Omar Hassan (born 11 March 1987) is an Italian contemporary artist. He lives in Milan and works in Milan and London.

== Biography ==
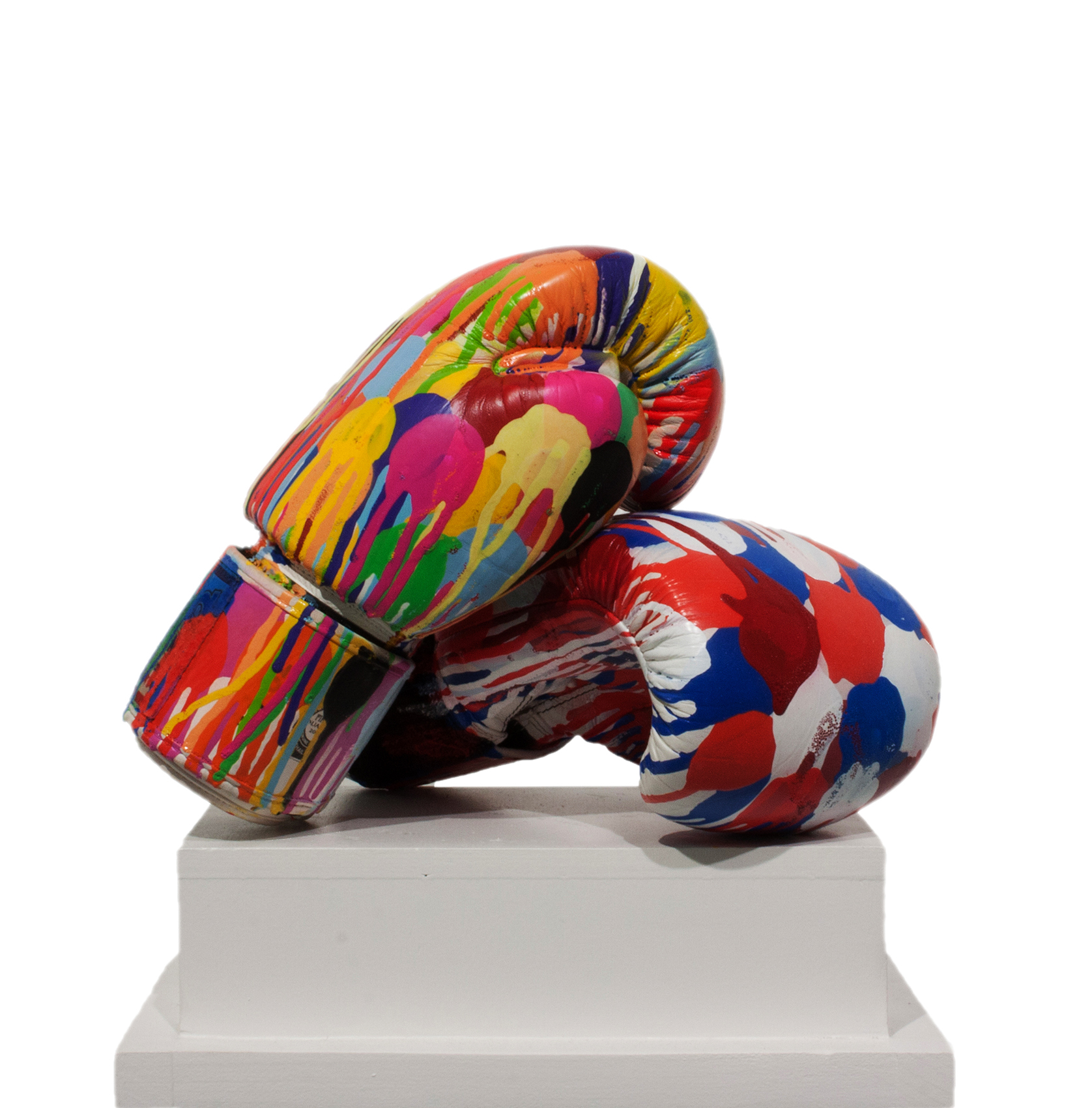
Omar Hassan, Glove Save the Queen, Mixed media, 25x17 cm

Omar Hassan was born in 1987 in Milan, Italy, to an Italian mother and an Egyptian father. His best friend, a prolific graffiti artist, encouraged a 15-year-old Omar to join him in experimenting on the walls of his native city. Hassan later witnessed his best friend fall to his death in one of Milan's tunnels.

The tragedy proved a formative event for Hassan. The artist felt compelled to explore various paths, experimenting with a significant talent for boxing and fearless creative risks. However, after 10 years of training in the ring, Hassan was forced to abandon his love of boxing and the lure of competitive sport when a diagnosis of diabetes was discovered – disqualifying him from professional boxing on the grounds of health and safety. Being unable to fully explore this passion, Hassan returned to his other love; investing all his energy into his artistic practice.

Being diagnosed with type 1 diabetes, Hassan raised money for Diabetes UK via selling a piece of performance art he created at the private view of his exhibition ‘Breaking Through’.

Hassan collaborated with artist Helidon Xhixha to support Diabetes Research Institute Foundation (DRI) at an art event in Miami.

Hassan graduated from the Brera Academy of Fine Arts in 2010, and after several group and solo exhibitions, he was invited by Vittorio Sgarbi; curator of the Italian Pavilion, to exhibit at the 2011 54th Venice Biennale.

== Technique ==
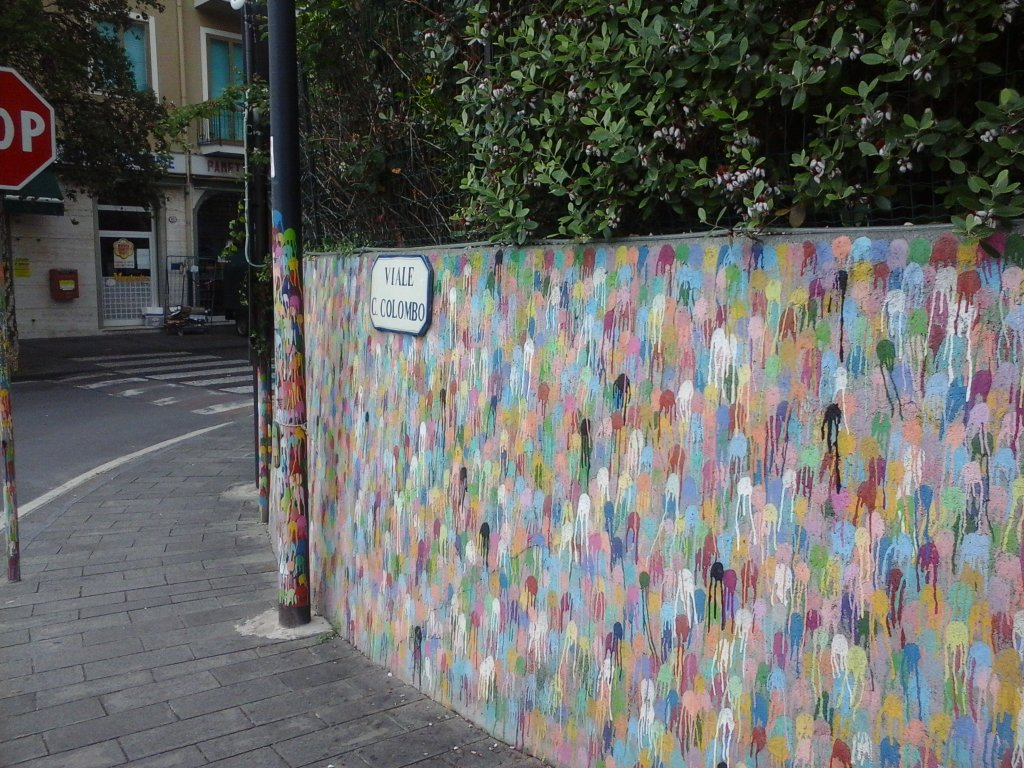
The wall Borgio Verezzi in Wonderland realized in 2011 by Omar Hassan in Borgio Verezzi, Italy

In a series of paintings, Hassan performs a painting technique inspired by his boxing career. This involves dipping his boxing gloves into paint and punching onto a large canvas. He uses some classical references in his work, such as Nike taking off the sandal, but also takes some influence from Islamic art. Additionally, he creates sculptures and patterns from the spray painting materials he uses. His series of paintings called Injections, are single dots of colour with streams of paint issuing from the nucleus. They refer to his daily shots of insulin from being diabetic.

== Public works ==
Hassan has created several public works in Italy and the UK. These include One Wall at the Palazzo della Regione in Milan, the Museo Mille Miglia in Brescia, the Accademia delle Belle Arti Aldo Galli in Como and Colour Cube in London's Brick Lane. The latter work was created by redecorating a concrete bollard located alongside the East London Line. They all make use of his signature motif found in the injections series.

== Solo exhibitions ==
2009
- Gaijin, Musashy Gallery, Tokyo.

2011
- H.O.2, Fabbrica Eos, Milan.

2012
- Jab, Jab!!, Colossi Arte Contemporanea, Brescia.

2014
- L'essenziale è Invisibile agli Occhi, Castle, Montesegale.

2015
- Breaking Through, ContiniArtUK, London.
- Breaking Through — Miami, Rosenbaum Contemporary, Bal Harbour, Florida.

2016
- Breaking Through Milan, M.A.C centre, Milan.
- Breaking Through New York, UNIX Gallery, New York City.

2017
- Do ut Des, Abbazia della Misericordia, Venice

2018
- L’essenziale è invisibile agli occh'i - Dialogue with Kandinsky Villa Reale di Monza, Monza (ITALY)

2019
- Breaking Through Black Miami

2020
- Sotto Sopra, curated by Maria Savarese, Palazzo delle Arti Napoli,Naples

- SopraSotto, Prometeo Gallery by Ida Pisani, Milan

2021
- Breaking Through Berlin, Luisa Catucci Gallery, Berlin

2022
- Il Mondo è N(v)OSTRO, Fondazione Stelline, Milan

2023
- PUNCTUM, Palazzo Reale per Fondazione Federico II, Palermo

2024
- EXIT LIGHTS, Porta di Milano, Milan Malpensa Airport Terminal 1

- PAX, Cappella Nuova, Orta San Giulio

== Gallery ==
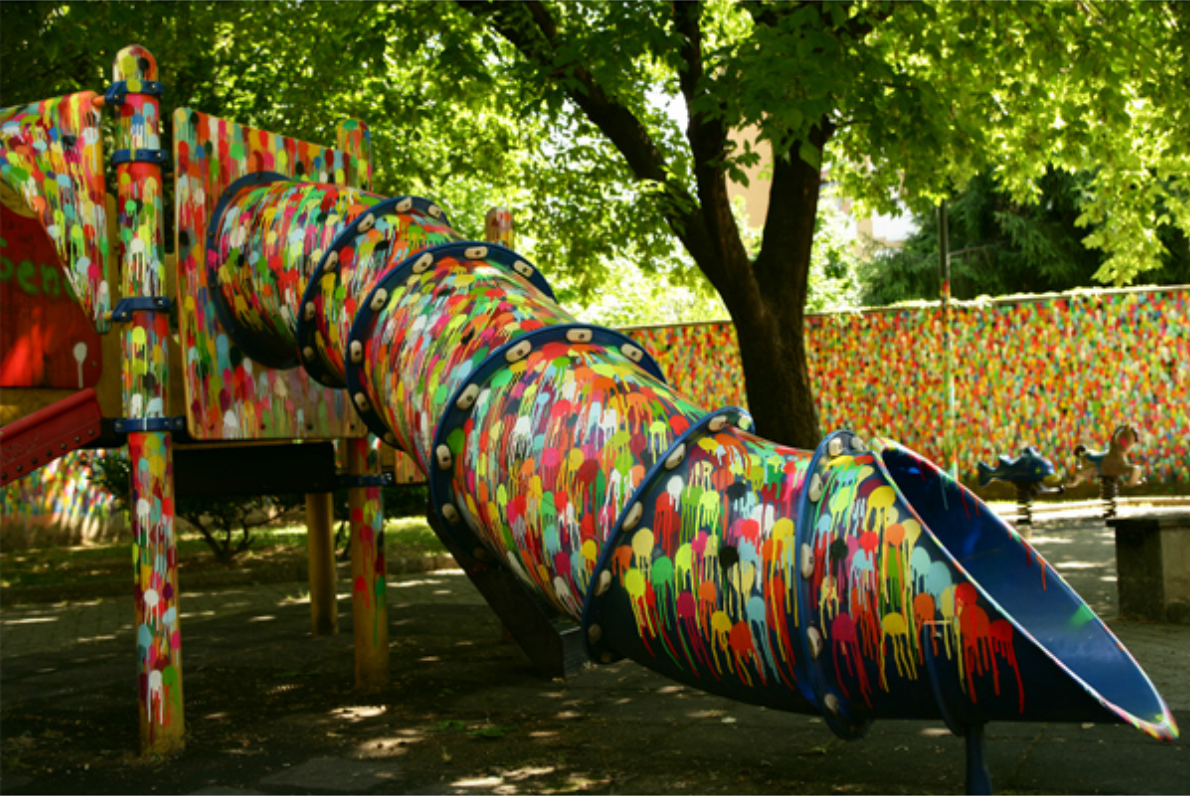
Milan, Italy

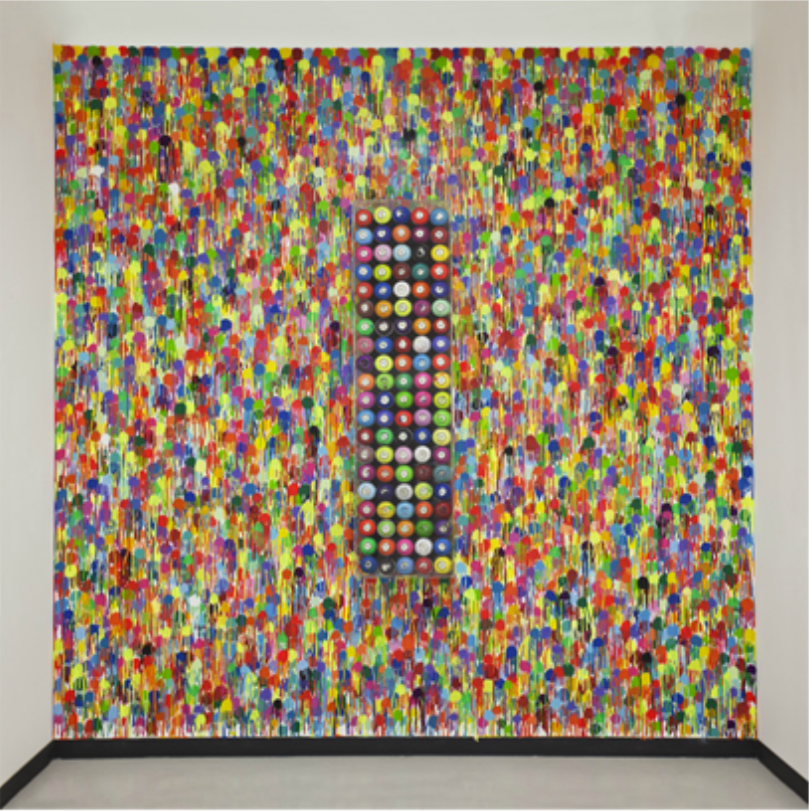
Milan, Italy

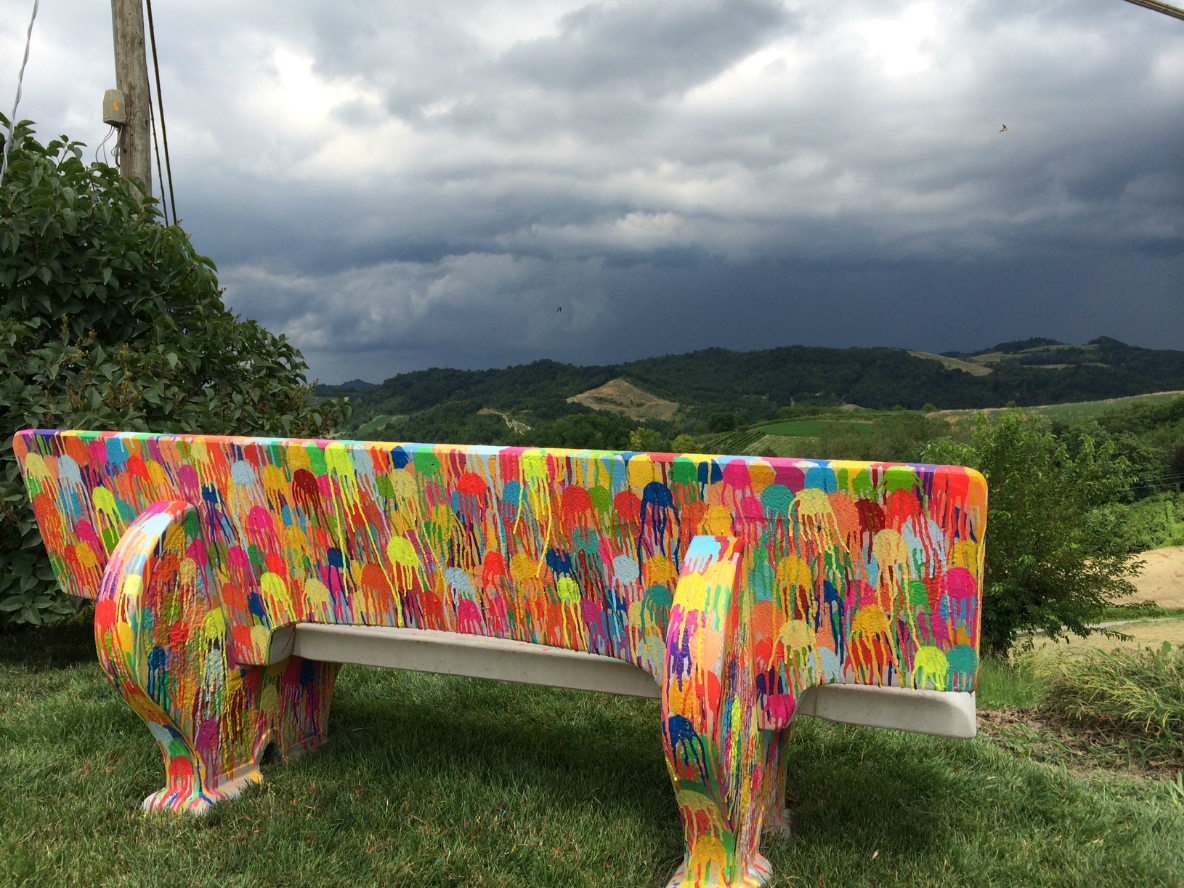
Montesegale, Italy

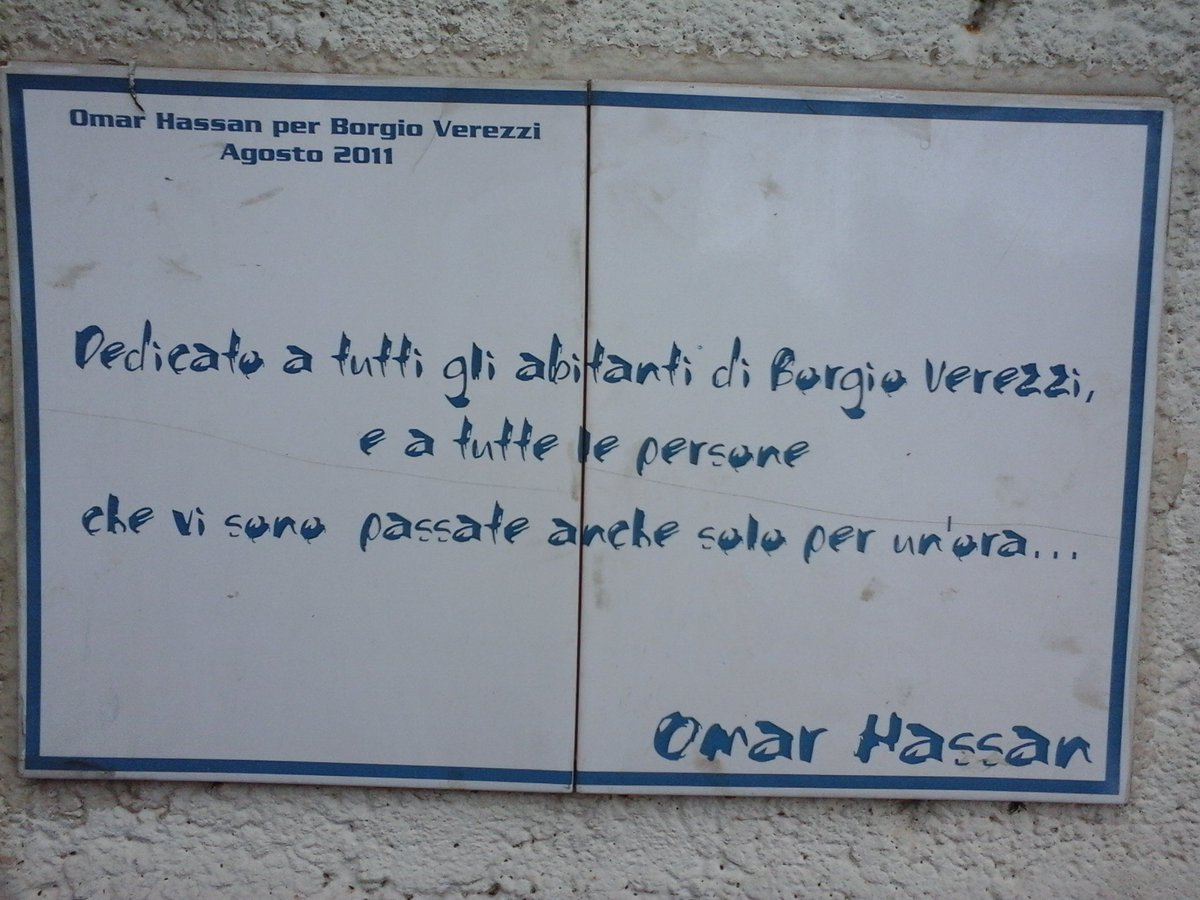
Borgio Verezzi, Italy

== Selected publications ==
2013

London Street Art, by Frank Steam156 Malt, 2013.
