= Xhixha =

Xhixha is an Albanian surname. Notable people with the surname include:

- Andi Xhixha (born 1991), Albanian footballer
- Helidon Xhixha (born 1970), Albanian contemporary artist
- Redon Xhixha (born 1998), Albanian professional footballer
