= Mira Lehr =

American artist (1936–2023)

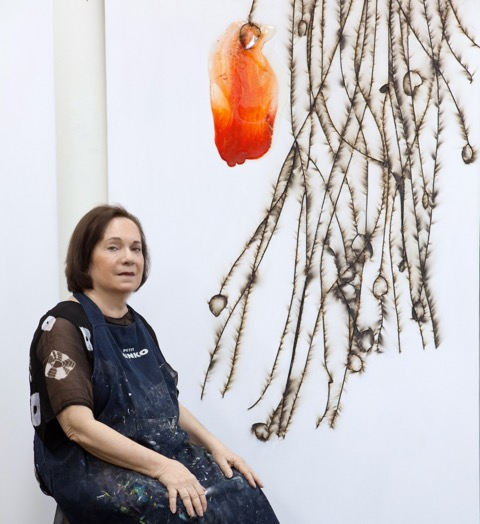
- Lehr in 2015
- Born: Mira Tager; September 22, 1934; Brooklyn, New York, U.S.
- Died: January 24, 2023 (aged 88)
- Education: School of the Museum of Fine Arts, Boston
- Alma mater: Vassar College

Mira Lehr (September 22, 1934 – January 24, 2023) was an American multidisciplinary artist. Her work encompassed painting, design, sculpture, and video installation. Lehr created abstract works inspired by the natural world.

== Early life and education ==
Mira Lehr was born in Brooklyn, neighborhood of New York City, on September 22, 1934. Her father, Charles I. Tager, was an inventor who patented an affordable, efficient version of the modern stapler.

Lehr received a degree in art history from Vassar College in 1956, where she studied under Adolf Katzenellenbogen, Wolfgang Lotz, and notable feminist historian Linda Nochlin. After college she did post-graduate work at the School of the Museum of Fine Arts, Boston and received a Rockefeller scholarship that supported a studio in Carnegie Hall. Lehr studied with a range of artists through her career, including James Brooks, James Billmyer, Nieves Marshaleck Billmyer (Hans Hofmann School) and Robert Motherwell. Although she maintained her studio practice consistently, she didn't start widely exhibiting her work until the 1980s.

In 1960 Lehr moved back with her husband to Miami Beach, where she had been raised. She described the lack of art scene and cultural vibrancy as being "like a desert island.” She and a contingent of other female artists founded Continuum Gallery, which lasted into the 1990s. It was among the first women's co-op gallery spaces in the South East, and many of its founders are still involved with the now-bourgeoning Miami art scene. Many art world luminaries came to lead workshops, speak and interact with the members, including Betty Parsons, John Chamberlain and Buckminster Fuller. Lehr was later selected by Fuller in 1969 to work on the first World Game Scenario Project at the New York Studio School.

== Artwork and themes ==
Sand Bar, 2014, Mixed media on canvas, 54 x 72 inches

Working with imagery from the natural world, Lehr creates layered abstract compositions with unconventional materials. 60 Minutes correspondent Morley Safer referred to her as "the mistress of light". The lush flora of her Florida home has a profound influence on her aesthetic vocabulary. Lehr seeks to express the natural world's essence and patterns, so that her artwork expresses the reality of nature better than a naturalistic rendering. On closer inspection, they reveal a myriad of contrasts — natural imagery with abstract gesture, dense planes with translucent washes, and rich, abraded textures with a crisp, contemporary structure. Art historian Irving Sandler describes her use of imagery thus: “What makes Lehr's work different is the specificity of her references to nature. I was trying to think of any other artist working in this tradition who did it quite as explicitly as Mira did and I couldn’t come up with one."

Lehr played with things intangible and impermanent- in her sculptures, for example, the shadows created on the wall are as much a part of the piece as the physical objects. With her use of poured resins in her paintings, the spaces that separate layers are integral marks themselves.

Lehr's work has been noted for its environmentalist connotations; one exhibition, "The Pull of the Tide” in Miami, was particularly explicit about its intentions. Coastlines, which are fragile ecosystems, are threatened by pollution and development. While the sculptures are seductively beautiful, they are partially made of politically charged materials, including jute hemp, whose purpose is to prevent land from eroding. Lehr created forms that resemble jellyfish, which can regenerate themselves. She describes taking inspiration from the cycle of nature- we have polluted and overfished the oceans, but they are now threatening to encroach on our developed world.

== Asian influence ==
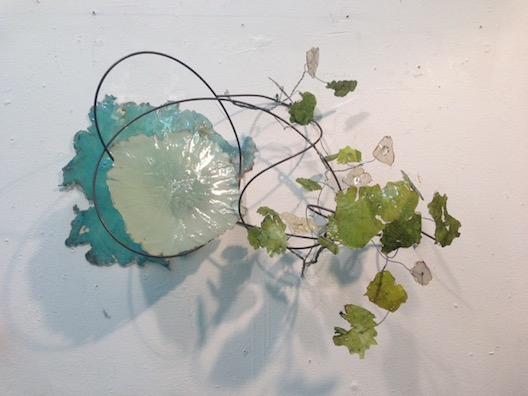
Sea Foam 1, 2014, Steel wire, resin, Japanese paper, ink, 24" x 36" x 16”

Many critics have commented upon an Asian or Japanese influence, particularly in her choice of materials and processes; Lehr uses Japanese paper, ink, lacquer, and woodblock printing in her work. The deliberate and balanced compositions are reminiscent of scroll-painted landscapes.

Critic Courtney Powers Curtiss emphasized how Lehr's paintings have a spirituality associated with nature that is found in many Asian belief systems.

Historian Eleanor Heartney's take: "The hanging moons, silhouetted bellflowers and expressive freestyle lines do evoke an Asian aesthetic. But in fact, Lehr was well on her way to this approach to art before she began to fully appreciate Asian art. Instead the connection must be sought at a deeper level. Lehr's work, like that of the Japanese masters, is based on a honing down, and a sense of disciplined restraint. Lehr's interest in haiku comes out of this approach. Like those highly structured and deeply minimalist poems, in which a whole world is evoked with a few words or a simple metaphor, she is interested in creating a reality in which a few forms and lines speak volumes."

== Later work ==
Lehr started experimenting with explosives in her work. She uses gunpowder and fuses, which burn holes and leave imprints on her layered paintings. The resulting forms resemble lace with an uncontrolled, grainy quality. She describes her use of explosives as tying into the theme of creation versus destruction, which is integral to the cycle of nature.

Lehr also expanded her practice to include resin, Japanese rice paper, and steel wire. She also uses marine rope to create large scale mangrove root sculptures.

== Career ==
Lehr exhibited widely in the United States, particularly New York and Florida, and internationally with the Art in Embassies program. Her pieces have been included in exhibitions and archives of the New Museum, the Smithsonian Museum of American Art, and the Getty Museum.

In 2015 a retrospective, titled Mira Lehr: Mapping Nature, was held at Rosenbaum Contemporary in Florida.

Throughout her career she collaborated with design companies Holly Hunt and Stephanie Odegard, for whom she designed handmade rugs. In 2016, Lehr was invited to have a solo show at the Fairchild Tropical Gardens titled Second Nature. Shortly after, Lehr was commissioned to create an outdoor sculpture in celebration of the Vizcaya Museum and Gardens centennial. This outdoor sculpture served as a performance set for the opera Dido and Aeneas. In 2018 Lehr was selected for a museum wide exhibition at the Museum of Contemporary Art, North Miami, titled Tracing the Red Thread. It referred to the complex environmental situation we find ourselves in today. USA Today named one of the must-see exhibitions of fall 2018. Artnet also listed the exhibition as one of "33 Museum Shows Worth Traveling For." The exhibition subsequently traveled to Fritz Gallery, and to the Orlando Mennello Museum of American Art in 2020. Mangrove sculptures from the exhibition were part of a special project at Pinta Miami, Ad-Astra, held at Mana Contemporary during Art Basel 2018. 2019 also included a solo show at the Jewish Museum of Florida.

== Personal life and death ==
Lehr died on January 24, 2023, at the age of 88.

== Publications ==
- Lehr, Mira with Eleanor Heartney, Larry Littany Litt, Cristina Maria Molina (September 2018). Mira Lehr: Tracing the Red Thread. Silver Hollow Press. ISBN 9780998956879.
- Lehr, Mira with Eleanor Heartney, Thom Collins and Irving Sandler (May 2015). Mira Lehr: Arc of Nature. Hudson Hills. ISBN 978-1555953911.
- Barter, Judith (2009). American Modernism at the Art Institute of Chicago. Yale University Press.
- Clemence, Paul and Julie Davidow (2007). Miami Contemporary Artists. Schiffer Publishing Ltd. ISBN 9780764326479.
