= Dengler =

Dengler is a surname. It may refer to:

- Carlos Dengler (born 1974), American musician
- Clyde Dengler (1899–1992), American politician
- Dieter Dengler (1938–2001), German-American naval aviator and pilot
- Frank Dengler (1853–1879), American sculptor
- Gerhard Dengler (1914–2007), German writer, journalist, and editor
