= School of the Museum of Fine Arts at Tufts =

Art school of Tufts University

Coordinates: 42.33856°N 71.09676°W

School of the Museum of Fine Arts at Tufts University
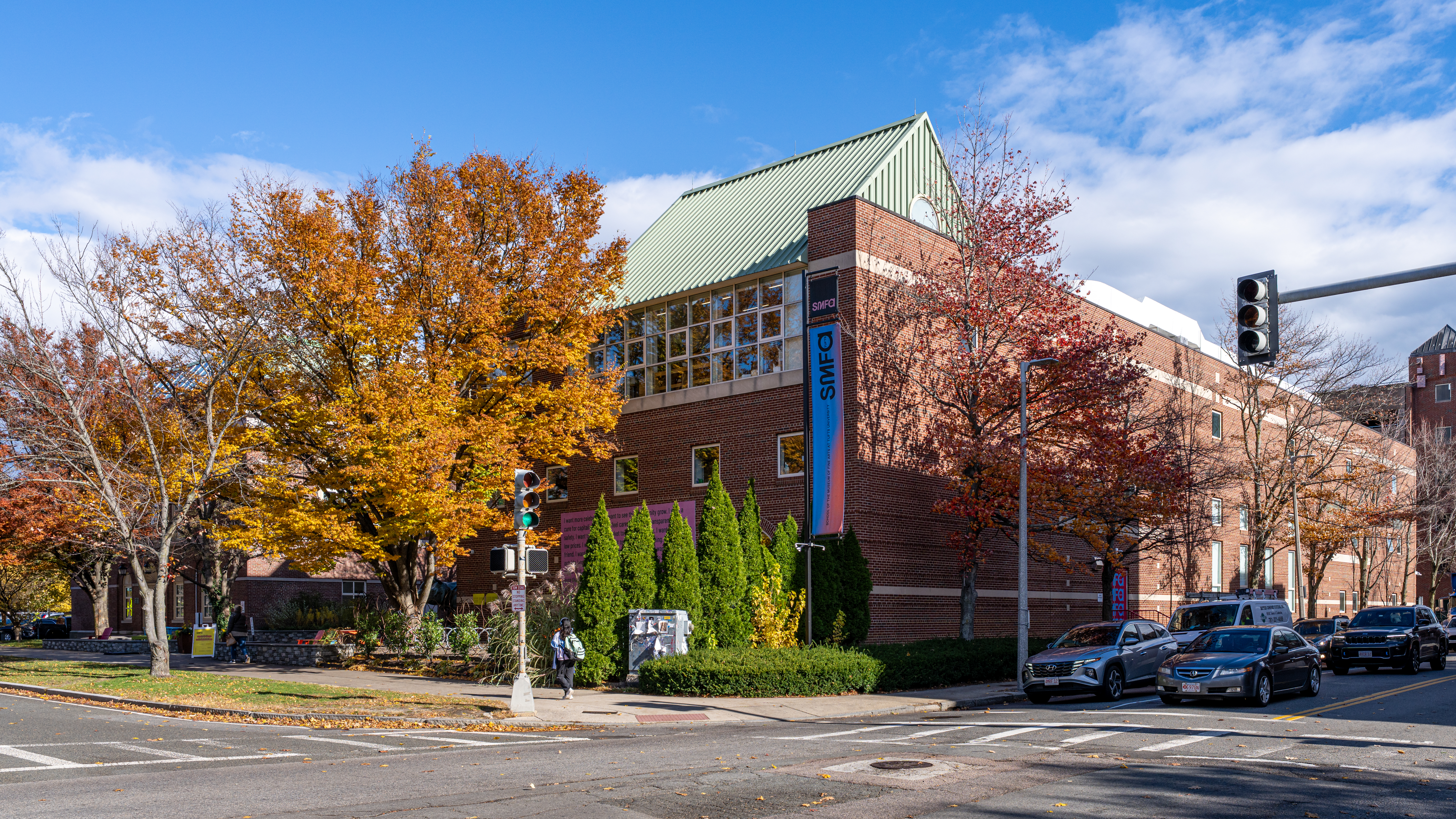
- Type: Private
- Established: 1876; 150 years ago
- Parent institution: Tufts University
- Accreditation: NASAD; AICAD
- Dean: Scheri Fultineer
- Faculty: 135 full- and part-time
- Undergraduates: 301
- Postgraduates: 149
- Location: Boston, Massachusetts, United States
- Campus: Urban
- Website: smfa.tufts.edu
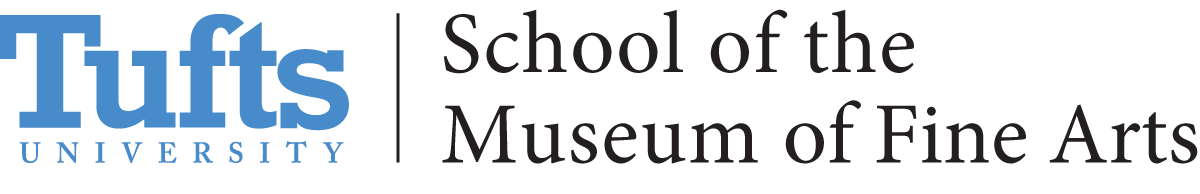

The School of the Museum of Fine Arts at Tufts University (Museum School, SMFA at Tufts, or SMFA; formerly the School of the Museum of Fine Arts, Boston) is a dedicated art school within Tufts University, a private research university in Massachusetts. SMFA is part of Tufts University's largest school, the School of Arts and Sciences, and offers both undergraduate and graduate degrees that combine studio arts training with interdisciplinary liberal arts and science education.

It is affiliated with the Museum of Fine Arts, Boston. SMFA is a member of the Association of Independent Colleges of Art and Design (AICAD), a consortium of several dozen leading art schools in the United States, and is accredited by the New England Commission of Higher Education (NECHE).

== History ==
The Weems Center, part of Graham Gund's expansion, looking down from the third floor

The School was founded in 1876 under the name School of the Museum of Fine Arts, Boston (SMFA). From 1876 to 1909, the School was housed in the basement of the original Museum building in Copley Square. When the MFA Boston moved to Huntington Avenue in 1909, the School moved into a separate, temporary structure to the west of the museum's main building. The permanent building, designed by Guy Lowell, was completed in 1927. The 45,000-square-foot (4,200 m^{2}) red brick building provided improved classroom, studio and library facilities.

In 1945, the Museum School and Tufts College first collaborated to develop a joint degree program focused on teacher training. The creation of additional programs in cooperation with the two institutions followed soon after. SMFA and Tufts established joint Bachelor of Fine Arts and Master of Fine Arts degree programs in 1956 and 1966, respectively.

In 1987, a newly renovated and expanded school building, designed by architect Graham Gund, more than doubled the size of the existing structure; providing an auditorium, enlarged library, expanded studios and classrooms, a spacious new entrance, cafeteria, and increased gallery and exhibition spaces. Gund's expansion included the central atrium, known as the Katherine Lane Weems Atrium, that connects the two buildings.

In December 2015, it was announced that the School of the Museum of Fine Arts, Boston would become a part of Tufts University and on June 30, 2016, the integration was completed.

With the late-2022 opening of the Green Line Extension of the MBTA Green Line E branch light rail transit route, there is a direct connection between the SMFA Campus and the main campus of Tufts University in Medford.

== Academics ==
Encouraged to build an individual program of interdisciplinary study, students are not asked to declare a major, but by choosing among in-depth courses in a dozen disciplines and mediums, students are free to concentrate in the areas that best align with their interests. Courses are offered in the following areas: animation, ceramics, digital media, drawing, film and video, graphic arts, installation, metals, painting, performance, photography, print and paper, sculpture, sound, and virtual reality, as well as visual and material studies (VMS), which consists of cross-disciplinary study of the related fields of art and architectural history, film, and the language arts.

One of the unique attributes of SMFA is that students are required to participate in a "Review Board," which is a review of all of the artwork that a student has completed during a semester. Review Boards are led by two faculty members and two fellow students. There are many opportunities for students to exhibit their artwork at SMFA's main building on the Fenway, at the Mission Hill building, and on the Tufts Medford-Somerville campus.

Opportunities to exhibit works include the annual SMFA Art Sale and the juried "Student Annual Exhibition." Various galleries and spaces that are available to students around the school buildings include Bag Gallery, Hallway Gallery, Bathroom Gallery, Underground Gallery, and spaces in the Museum of Fine Arts, Boston.

The school's main campus building, located at 230 the Fenway, is adjacent to and just to the west of the Museum of Fine Arts, Boston. Most studio classroom space is located here, as well as the SMFA Cafe, the W. Van Alan Clark, Jr. Library, the School Art Store, and the Grossman Gallery, which is part of the Tufts University Art Galleries' exhibition space. The Mission Hill building, located about a quarter mile from the main building, includes studio spaces for graduate and post-baccalaureate students as well as classrooms, workshops, and The SMFA Writing Center.

== W. Van Alan Clark, Jr. Library ==
The W. Van Alan Clark, Jr. Library at the School of the Museum of Fine Arts (SMFA) is the fine arts branch of Tufts University's Tisch Library. The library's collections focus heavily on contemporary art and studio practice. Its circulating collection is primarily focused on books, multimedia content, print periodicals, zines, and ephemera related to the areas of study at SMFA. Special Collections are non-circulating — for in-library use and viewable only by appointment — and devoted mainly to artists' books.

== Notable faculty ==
=== Painting and drawing faculty ===
- David Aronson, painter and sculptor
- Ture Bengtz (diploma 1933), Boston Expressionist school painter; later a teacher at the School of the Museum of Fine Arts
- Ria Brodell, drawing and painting
- Yanyun Chen, drawing, installation and animation practice
- David Antonio Cruz, painter and interdisciplinary artist
- Edward Waldo Emerson, physician, painter, and writer; son of Ralph Waldo Emerson
- Angelina Gualdoni, painter
- Esther Geller (attended 1921), abstract expressionist painter, known for encaustic painting; taught with Karl Zerbe (1943–1944)
- Philip Leslie Hale (attended 1883), painter; faculty (1893–1931)
- Arnold Borisovich Lakhovsky, painter; taught painting starting in 1935
- William McGregor Paxton, painter and a co-founder of The Guild of Boston Artists; faculty (1906–1913)
- Karl Zerbe, painter; head of Department of Painting (1937–1955)

=== Performance faculty ===
- Marilyn Arsem, performance artist
- María Magdalena Campos-Pons, artist; works in photography, performance, audiovisual media, and sculpture
- Neda Moridpour, performance artist and activist

=== Photography faculty ===
- Bill Burke, photographer
- Zora J. Murff, photographer, curator and educator
- Laurel Nakadate, photographer, filmmaker, video and performance artist
- Rachelle Mozman Solano, photographer and video artist

=== Sculpture faculty ===
- Frederick Warren Allen, sculptor; taught for almost 50 years (1907–1954) and for 30 years was the head of the Sculpture Department; emeritus
- Frank Dengler, sculptor; faculty for a short time, until 1877
- Mags Harries, installation and sculpture
- Charles Grafly, sculptor; served as the head of modeling (1917–1929)
- Bela Lyon Pratt, sculptor; served as the head of modeling (1893–1917)

=== Other faculty ===
- Emil Otto Grundmann, first director of the school
- Rick Moody, writer and graphic artist
- Kurt Ralske, digital media and sound artist
- Chantal Zakari, book artist and graphic designer

== Notable alumni and faculty ==
- Marion Boyd Allen (attended 1896–1909), painter
- David Armstrong (attended in the 1970s), photographer
- Will Barnet (attended 1928–1930), painter and printmaker
- Carol Beckwith, photographer, writer; known for photojournalism documenting the indigenous tribal cultures of Africa
- Alon Bement (diploma 1898), painter, arts administrator, writer, and educator
- Ture Bengtz (diploma 1933), Boston Expressionist school painter, teacher at the School of the Museum of Fine Arts
- Frank Weston Benson (diploma 1883), American Impressionist painter, printmaker and watercolorist
- Jan Brett (attended 1969–1970), illustrator
- Margaret Fitzhugh Browne (attended 1909–1910), painter of portraits, indoor genre scenes, and still life
- David Buckley (MFA 1977), painter and former musician (with the Barracudas)
- Lisa Bufano (attended after 2003), interdisciplinary performance artist whose work incorporated dance, props, elements of doll-making, fabric work, and animation
- Al Capp, cartoonist of Li'l Abner
- Joseph Downs (attended 1921), curator at the Metropolitan Museum of Art and Winterthur Museum
- Marie Cosindas (attended 1947–1950, 1955–1956), photographer
- Holly Coulis (MFA 1998), painter
- Allan Rohan Crite (diploma 1936), painter
- Eleanor de Laittre (attended 1930), early proponent of abstract, cubist-inspired painting
- Adio diBiccari (attended 1932), sculptor
- Philip-Lorca diCorcia (diploma 1975, fifth-year certificate 1976), photographer
- Jim Dine (attended 1950–1953, 1955–1958), painter and printmaker
- Omer Fast (BFA 1995), video artist
- Zach Feuer (BFA 2000, attended 1996–2000), art dealer
- Esther Geller (attended 1921), abstract expressionist painter, known for encaustic painting; taught with Karl Zerbe (1943–1944)
- Kahlil George Gibran (attended 1940–1943) painter and sculptor
- Nan Goldin (diploma 1977, fifth-year certificate 1978), photographer
- Anita Glesta (MFA degree), installation artist
- William Snelling Hadaway (attended in the 1890s), book illustrator, jewelry and metal designer
- Philip Leslie Hale (attended 1883), painter; served as faculty (1893–1931)
- Phyllis Baker Hammond (attended in the 1950s), sculptor, artist, designer, educator
- Leslie Hall (attended 2000–2003), musician (front woman for Leslie and the Ly's)
- Mary Brewster Hazelton (graduated 1892) American portrait painter
- William Melton Halsey (attended 1935–1939), recipient of William Paige Fellowship, muralist and painter
- Juliana Hatfield (attended 2012), musician
- Todd Hido (BFA 1991), photographer
- Susan Howe (diploma 1961), poet, scholar, essayist and critic
- Hazel Brill Jackson, sculptor, engraver
- Joan Jonas (attended 1958–1961), performance artist
- Tom Jung (attended in the 1930s), graphic designer and illustrator
- Mira Lehr (attended in the 1950s), painter
- Steven Lisberger (diploma 1974), film director, producer and writer (known for his work on Tron (1982))
- David Lynch (attended 1964–1965), filmmaker
- Lois Mailou Jones (diploma 1927), painter
- Ellsworth Kelly (diploma 1948), painter, associated with hard-edge painting, Color Field painting and minimalism
- Ellen Levy (diploma 1981), multimedia artist and scholar; explores art, science, technology interrelationships and complex systems
- May Hallowell Loud (attended 1879–1883), painter
- F. Luis Mora (attended 1889), figural painter
- Mark Morrisroe (attended in the 1970s), photographer
- Laurel Nakadate (BFA 1998), photographer, film and video artist
- Lawrence Park (attended 1896–1897), art historian, architect, and genealogist
- William McGregor Paxton (faculty 1906-1913), Boston School painter
- Sheila Pepe (MFA 1995), artist and educator
- Amelia Peabody
- Sally Pierone (attended 1940–1942), art director and designer
- Carlo Pittore, (graduated 1966) American painter
- Vanessa Platacis, contemporary painter and installation artist
- Larry Poons (attended 1957–1958), abstract painter
- Liz Prince (BFA 2007; attended 2002–2007), comic book artist, Ignatz Award winner
- Sarah Gooll Putnam (attended 1877), painter
- Kelly Reichardt (MFA), filmmaker and screenwriter (known for Certain Women and First Cow)
- Rebecca Richardson Joslin, writer, lecturer, benefactor, club-woman
- Richard Scarry (diploma 1942), illustrator
- Doug and Mike Starn (diploma 1984, fifth-year certificate 1985), twin brothers, photographers and performance artists
- Frank Stout (attended 1949), figurative painter associated with post-abstract expressionist realism
- Tom Sutton (attended 1960), illustrator and comic book artist
- Edmund Tarbell (diploma 1882), painter
- Roger Thomas, interior designer
- Malcolm Travis (attended 1974–1978), musician (drummer with Human Sexual Response)
- Wallace Tripp (attended 1960–1964), illustrator
- Cy Twombly (diploma 1949), abstract painter
- Ricardo Viera (BFA 1973), Cuban-born American painter, printmaker, educator, museum director, art collector, and curator
- Christian Walker (diploma 1984), photographer and critic
- Katharine Lane Weems, sculptor
- John A. Wilson (attended 1896–1905), sculptor
- John Woodrow Wilson (attended 1939–1945), painter and printmaker
- Peter Wolf (attended in the 1960s), musician (known as the lead vocalist of the J. Geils Band (1967–1983))
- Levni Yilmaz (attended in the 1990s), filmmaker, animator, cartoonist

=== Performance artists groups ===
- Art School Cheerleaders (attended 1996–1998), performance art troupe
- Kaiju Big Battel (attended in the 1990s), performance art troupe featuring parodies of both professional wrestling and tokusatsu kaiju
- Mobius Artists Group founded in 1977, interdisciplinary artist troupe

== See also ==
- Bad Girrls Studios
- Cowles Art School
- Boston Expressionism
- Boston School (painting)
