= Ture Bengtz =

American painter

- Self-portrait, 1930s
- Born: 1907; Åland, Finland
- Died: November 10, 1973 (aged 66); Duxbury, Massachusetts, U.S.
- Education: School of the Museum of Fine Arts, Boston
- Spouse: Lillian Ericson Bengtz

Ture Bengtz (1907 – November 10, 1973) was a Finnish-American artist associated with the Boston Expressionist School, an influential teacher at the School of the Museum of Fine Arts in Boston, and director of the Art Complex Museum in Duxbury, Massachusetts. He also had a television show, "Bengtz on Drawing," on Boston's PBS station in the late 1950s.

== Early life and education ==
Bengtz was born in Åland, Finland, in 1907. At the age of 18 he emigrated from Finland to the United States to live with his relatives in Medford, Massachusetts. He worked as a house painter and went to night school to learn English. While taking an art class at night school, a teacher noticed Bengtz's talent and suggested he apply to an art school.

Bengtz enrolled at the School of the Museum of Fine Arts (the "museum school") in 1928. He won the school's top scholarship, the Paige Traveling Scholarship, which allowed him to study in Europe for two years. He graduated in 1933.

== Career ==
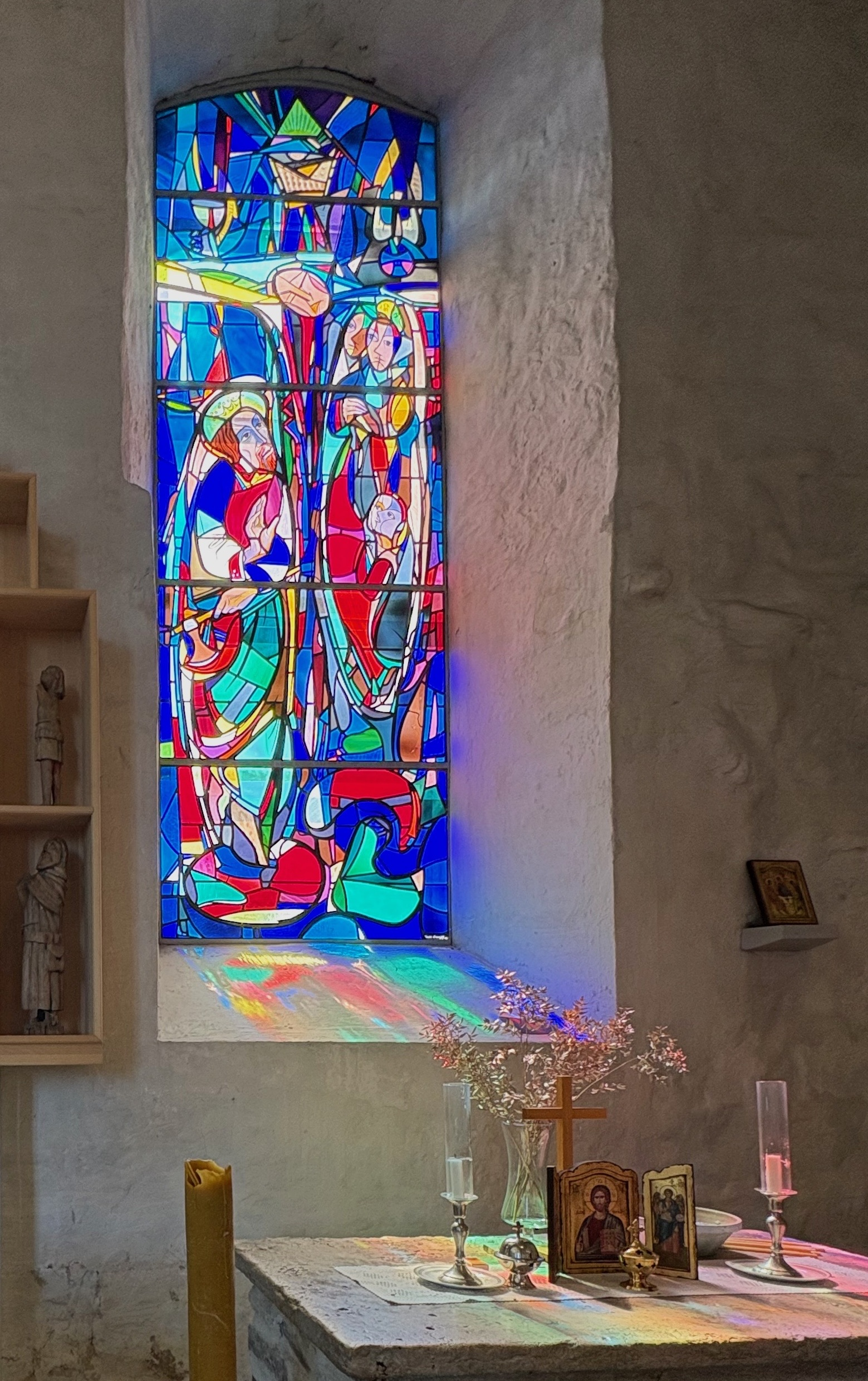
Bengtz created this colorful stained glass piece in 1968 for Saint Olaf's Church in Jomala, Åland.

Bengtz taught at the museum school from 1934 to 1969. During the 1940s he taught all four years of drawing, as well as anatomy and lithography, while Karl Zerbe taught all four years of painting. He founded the Graphics Department in 1939 and became head of the Drawing and Graphic Arts Department in 1941. During World War II he worked as a technical illustrator for the Raytheon Company.

In 1937, he had a solo exhibition of paintings and drawings at the Boston City Club. The art critic for the Boston Globe called him a "versatile genius" and "one of the most promising of the younger group of Boston artists." He continued to work with various media, exhibiting his work at Boston and New York galleries. Today he is best known for his lithographs.

In 1946, he co-founded the Boston Printmakers Association, which is still in operation today. He was a member of the Board of Governors of the Copley Society of Art and a Master of the Masonic lodge in Malden, Massachusetts. From 1957 to 1960 he had a television show on WGBH-TV, "Bengtz on Drawing," in which he demonstrated and lectured on the drawing of the human form. In 1968 he created a stained glass window for St. Olaf's Church, a 13th-century church in his ancestral home of Jomala; the window depicts Christ and St. Olaf, patron saint of Åland.

== Later years ==
After retiring from the museum school, Bengtz worked with the Carl A. Weyerhaeuser's family to plan and launch the Art Complex Museum in Duxbury, Massachusetts. He worked with the architect on the building plan, and became the museum's first director in 1971. He also taught art classes at Boston University.

Bengtz died at his home in Duxbury, on November 10, 1973. His works are included in the permanent collections of the Boston Museum of Fine Arts, the Smithsonian Institution, the Fogg Museum, the Cincinnati Art Museum, and other museums and private collectors. His papers are on file with the Boston Public Library.

The Art Complex Museum named its Bengtz Gallery in his honor, and published a collection of his lithographs in 1978. In 2007, the centennial of his birth was marked in Finland with an exhibition at the Önningebymuseet, and in 2010 the Finnish Government issued a postage stamp featuring a detail from the stained glass window he created for St. Olaf's Church.
