= Christian Walker (photographer) =

American photographer (1953–2003)

Christian Walker (1953, Springfield, Massachusetts – 2003) was an American photographer and critic primarily active in Boston and Atlanta from the mid 1970s until the mid 1990s.

== Art career ==
Walker's work explored multiple topics and themes, including the intersections of race, sexuality, drug use, and the HIV/AIDS crisis. Although his photographs dealing with sexuality often featured nudity, in the 1990s, he referred to his work as "anti-pornographic".

Walker first became active in the arts scene in Boston after moving there in 1974. His early work focused on documentary photography.

Walker graduated from the School of the Museum of Fine Arts at Tufts in 1984. He then moved to Atlanta; Walker said that this move also resulted in a shift in his work, specifically a shift in focus from an "economic analysis of culture" to work about the racial divides of the South. Around this time, Walker also began using non-traditional techniques, such as double exposure, and materials, such as paint, in his photographs.

In 1985, he began his Miscegenation Series (which would continue until 1988), in which he explored interracial relationships through 15 sepia-tone, close up photographs. Walker would also go on to write an essay, The Miscegenated Gaze, in which he called on white artists to "embrace and celebrate the concept of non-white subjectivity". In another project looking at Southern racial divides, Walker's Another Country series (whose name was inspired by James Baldwin's novel of the same name) juxtaposed images from the National Archives, rephotographed with "the black line of the 35mm negative as a dividing line". Mule Tales, a series which combined reappropriated imagery with racial jokes, drew criticism from both white and Black audiences. Walker explained that "white people thought...I was trying to make them feel guilty," while "black people felt I was bringing up some notions that should no longer exist in the culture".

Walker remained active in the arts scene until the 1990s.

== Exhibitions ==
Walker's work was exhibited at the Leslie-Lohman Museum of Art in New York City from September 2023 until January 2024. Following this, the exhibition is scheduled to move to Tufts University until April 2024.

Walker's works are held in museums such as the High Museum of Art, and the Studio Museum in Harlem.
