= Rosenbaum Contemporary =

Art gallery in South Florida, US

Coordinates: 26.393982°N 80.081494°W

Rosenbaum Contemporary is an American post-war, modern, and contemporary art gallery with two locations based in South Florida. It was founded in 1979 by father and son, Marvin and Howard Rosenbaum. They are a member of the Fine Art Dealers Association and exhibit artwork internationally in contemporary art fairs.

== History ==
In 1979, Rosenbaum Contemporary opened their first gallery on Banyan Trail in Boca Raton, Florida with the intentions of representing emerging and established artists. In 2012, Howard Rosenbaum's daughter, Lara Rosenbaum, joined the family business when she opened the gallery's second location inside the St. Regis Bal Harbour Hotel in Miami Beach. Later in 2013, the gallery moved to a more spacious location on Yamato Road

In 2015, during Art Basel Miami Beach, Rosenbaum Contemporary presented the work of Omar Hassan, debuting his art series Breaking Through for the first time in the United States. During the performance piece, the former-boxer dips his boxing gloves in paint and expressively punches color onto the canvas.

In 2016, Rosenbaum Contemporary collaborated with artist Helidon Xhixha in the inauguration of the public sculpture titled Endless Melody. The artwork was installed in the Melody Tower Plaza Garden in downtown Miami.

== Notable artists ==
Exhibited artists include:

- Donald Baechler
- Bill Beckley
- Vanessa Beecroft
- Mateo Blanco
- Fernando Botero
- Alexander Calder
- John Chamberlain
- George Condo
- Robert Cottingham
- CRASH
- Willem de Kooning
- Jim Dine
- Jean Dubuffet
- Nancy Dwyer
- Ron English
- Sam Francis
- Cleve Gray
- Omar Hassan
- Damien Hirst
- David Hockney
- Robert Indiana
- Alex Katz
- Mira Lehr
- Roberto Matta
- Raphael Mazzucco
- Joan Miró
- Elizabeth Murray
- Louise Nevelson
- Kenneth Noland
- Pablo Picasso
- Robert Polidori
- Simon Procter
- Robert Rauschenberg
- Richard Serra
- Hunt Slonem
- Antoni Tàpies
- Manolo Valdés
- Albert Watson
- Tom Wesselmann
- Helidon Xhixha
