= Mobius Artists Group =

Interdisciplinary group of artists in Boston, MA, US (founded 1977)

The Mobius Artists Group is an interdisciplinary group of artists, founded in 1977 by Marilyn Arsem in Boston, Massachusetts as Mobius Theater. It is known for incorporating a wide range of visual, performing and media arts into live performance, video, installation and intermedia works. The members of the group create projects individually and in collaboration with members of the group and other artists. Mobius, Inc. is an artist-run 501(c)3 non-profit organization for experimental work in all media. From 1983 to 2003, the group ran an alternative art center at 354 Congress Street in Boston, later moved to a space at 725 Harrison Avenue and are currently located across the river at 55 Norfolk Street in Cambridge, MA. Founded by members of the Mobius Artists Group in 1983, the art center is a laboratory for artists experimenting at the boundaries of their disciplines.

Mobius has produced hundreds of original works which have received favorable reviews in Boston, nationally and internationally. Works created at Mobius have been presented throughout the United States, Canada, Europe and Asia. It has a long-standing commitment to artist-exchange projects, which bring artists from different regions together to work. International exchange projects with artists from Macedonia, Croatia, Poland, and Taiwan have focused on site-specific works in public places. Mobius has presented work involving thousands of artists over its 30-year history and is recognized as one of the seminal alternative, artist-run organizations in the U.S. It inspired the creation of other experimental artist-run performance spaces in Boston, including Bad Girrls Studios.

The MAG has undergone several changes over its 30-year history, but has retained an experimental inter-media emphasis and continues to function as an artist-managed organization. The group's membership has changed, with new members joining and older members leaving every year or two (although several members have been with the group either from the beginning or from the 1980s. There are generally between 12 and 20 members, with performance art, new music/sound art, installation, dance/movement, and video/film the disciplines most often represented. Since the mid-1990s, site-specific performance and installation works have become an increasingly important element of MAG members’ works and the group has fostered international connections, serving as a locus for international exchange.

== History ==
The company's theater pieces were directed by Marilyn Arsem (a faculty member of the School of the Museum of Fine Arts, Boston), and were based on 1970s experimental theatre. They generally used texts written by others, but developed then collaboratively as a basis for structured improvisation. With a strong emphasis on the physical presence and stamina of their performers, the pieces were presented in the real (or actual) time shared with the audience (in contrast to “theatrical” time). The group's name came from a characteristic aspect of theater pieces of that era. “Audience-activated performance pieces” were those in which structured audience input was crucial in determining aspects of a performance, including its length. This differed from audience participation as it is usually understood. In Persephone and Hades, for example, performances could be as brief as one hour or as long as three hours (or more), depending on an audience's desire (and endurance). The cyclical nature of these early pieces suggested a Möbius strip.

Between 1980 and 1983, Mobius Theater rented fifth-floor loft space on Kingston Street in Boston's Chinatown district. This space did not satisfy building-code requirements for public presentation; for example, it only had DC electricity, so in order to use any equipment, AC electricity was provided by an upstairs neighbor who ran an extension cord down to the space from his own loft. As a result, the Kingston Street space was used for workshop performances and audiences solicited privately by mail. Public performances were given at spaces such as the Helen Shlien Gallery in the nearby Fort Point neighborhood, the Massachusetts College of Art and Design’s Overland Street theater, and two spaces in Boston's Leather District Gallery East and the South Street Loft. The private workshop performances featured monthly works-in-progress in which members of the company and invited artists showed their own developing works and stages in the theater's group work, followed by an audience discussion (an uncommon presentation format during the early 1980s). MAG continued to present works-in-progress into the 21st century; the format expanded to include movement works-in-progress and student works, featuring pieces by area college students.

By 1983 the above-mentioned public-performance spaces had all disappeared or were in danger of doing so. In response to this situation Helen Shlien, who was closing her Fort Point gallery space, offered to help Mobius Theater obtain a lease to that space. At that time the Fort Point neighborhood was an area of neglected warehouses, colonized by what became in its time the largest artists' community in New England. As often happens with such areas, artists turned empty lofts into live/work spaces (legally or illegally), with landlords turning a blind eye in return for increased neighborhood stability. Helen Shlien was a pioneer in the presentation of installation work and performance art; without her advocacy, the development of such art in the Boston area would have been impaired, and the Mobius Artists Group would not have enjoyed the longevity it achieved.

Mobius Theater changed its name to Mobius, Inc. at this time, partly to avoid identifying the new space with a specific medium. Mobius, Inc. opened a performance/gallery space (named Mobius) in summer 1983. The move was celebrated by a five-hour, multi-location piece (Orpheus), which began in the Kingston Street loft and ended in the former Shlien gallery space. Mobius remained at 354 Congress Street in Fort Point for 20 years, closing in June 2003.

In 1984, Mobius Inc. changed its name to Mobius Performing Group (MPG); its membership changed to include those self-identified as performance artists, in addition to those self-identified as experimental-theater artists. The work presented by MPG had already branched out to include works created and performed by individual group members, in addition to those conceived and directed by Arsem. In addition (due to relationships formed in the Orpheus project), collaborations with experimental artists from other disciplines were featured. In 1987, MPG decided to open its membership to artists outside the theater/performance art field and its name changed to Mobius Artists Group.

MAG presented work in a wide range of media by artists ranging from local to international. Nevertheless, the group's primary focus was on the local/regional (Boston/eastern New England) experimental arts scene, with the Mobius space a resource for development. The space remained artist-run; although the group has had paid staff during its history, its directors have always been members of the artists' group. This has given the Group autonomy in organizational direction, at the cost of volunteer effort and personal responsibility. For many, being a MAG member meant hard work for long periods (especially during the group's 20 years in Fort Point. At its zenith Mobius presented performances and installation nearly every week, ten months out of the year. Staff and group members had extensive contact with guest artists, including liaison and the review of proposals. The ArtRages fundraising parties, which began in the late 1990s and continued through 2007, were the high point of the Mobius programming year. The parties featured multiple simultaneous performances and installations with music by area bands and musicians, and served as community events.

Mobius published a print newsletter, in which the artists scheduled to present their work spoke for themselves. The ability of artists to communicate to a range of readers through writing varied widely, resulting in an unevenness in the quality of newsletter entries. Still, the newsletter allowed a direct presentation of artists’ voices.

During the late 1980s, Mobius, Inc. developed exchange programs with other art spaces and artists’ organizations. In these programs, artists from the partner organizations would present work either at Mobius or at other spaces (in programs produced by Mobius). In turn, MAG members visited the partner organizations. The first exchanges in the United States included partnerships with the 911 Media Arts Center (Seattle), The LAB (San Francisco), the Pyramid Art Center (Rochester, NY) and NO BIAS (Bennington, Vermont). By the mid-1990s these exchanges had become global; many group members became part of an informal, extensive network of international performance artists. Major international exchange projects include:

- 1996–1997: Liquor Amnii—an exchange with women artists from Macedonia in cooperation with Skopsko Leto (Skopje, Macedonia) and the Convergence Festival (Providence, Rhode Island)
- 1999–2000: Usvajanje Slobode ("Taking Liberty"), an exchange with artists in Istria, Croatia
- 2001–2002: "Digging the Channel" (Croatian: Prokopavanje Kanala), an exchange with artists in Zadar, Croatia
- 2003: Juliiett 484, an exchange with artists in Ustka and Gdansk, Poland (in the United States, work was presented in Providence, Boston, and New York)

These exchanges reached a high point with the Mobius International Festival of Performance Art, a five-night series of performances presented in Boston in November 2006. This festival featured over 20 international artists and the work of every member of the Artists Group (then numbering 15). In addition to organizational exchanges, individual group members have been invited to present work in over two dozen countries including Taiwan, Argentina, Canada and Germany.

In 2003, Mobius Inc.’s lease with the Boston Wharf Company expired. Mobius had benefited from its membership in the Fort Point Artists Community and its relationship with Boston Wharf, receiving 20 years of below-market-rate leases in commercial space. In the meantime, however, the Fort Point area had become highly desirable for urban development. Despite many years of activism and organization, artists were forced out of the area; buildings were either commercially redeveloped or destroyed. Mobius concluded its tenure at 354 Congress Street with Mobius 25, a two-week festival of performances and exhibits of visual art work by MAG members and friends dating back to Mobius Theater.

From 2003 to 2007, the Mobius Artists Group was itinerant. The group occupied two office/meeting spaces in Fort Point, but there was no full-time usable space available for the presentation of artwork. It continued to work in donated or affordable space in the Boston area and overseas, with individual and group projects presented regionally and internationally. The search for a new full-time, permanent space continued. While there was some benefit in discovering different places for the development of artwork, the hunt for space and negotiation of terms precluded long-term planning efforts.

In summer 2007, Mobius moved to 725 Harrison Ave. (in Boston’s South End neighborhood) in the ArtBlock development, near the Boston Medical Center (formerly City Hospital), on the outskirts of a thriving artists’ neighborhood. In June 2011, Mobius moved to 55 Norfolk Street in Central Square, Cambridge. The Artists Group (which numbered 23 on January 1, 2012) retains its commitment to presenting new work in a variety of media. MAG also continues its relationship with area performance students, primarily through personal relationships with the Performance Area of the School of the Boston Museum of Fine Arts.

In 2010, members of the Mobius Artists Group were invited By Grace Exhibition Space of Brooklyn, NY to take part in "INFILTRATE!", a festival of performance art at the Fountain NY Art Fair on Pier 66. In January 2012, the Mobius Artists Group were invited to perform for the opening reception and first two weeks of "100 Years (version #4 Boston, 2012)" organized by MoMA PS1 in collaboration with Performa. The Exhibition was curated by Klaus Biesenbach, MoMA PS1 Director and MoMA Chief Curator at Large; and RoseLee Goldberg, Performa Director and Curator. At the Boston University Art Gallery, the exhibition was coordinated by Director and Chief Curator Kate McNamara.
