= Eliot Hall =

- U.S. National Register of Historic Places
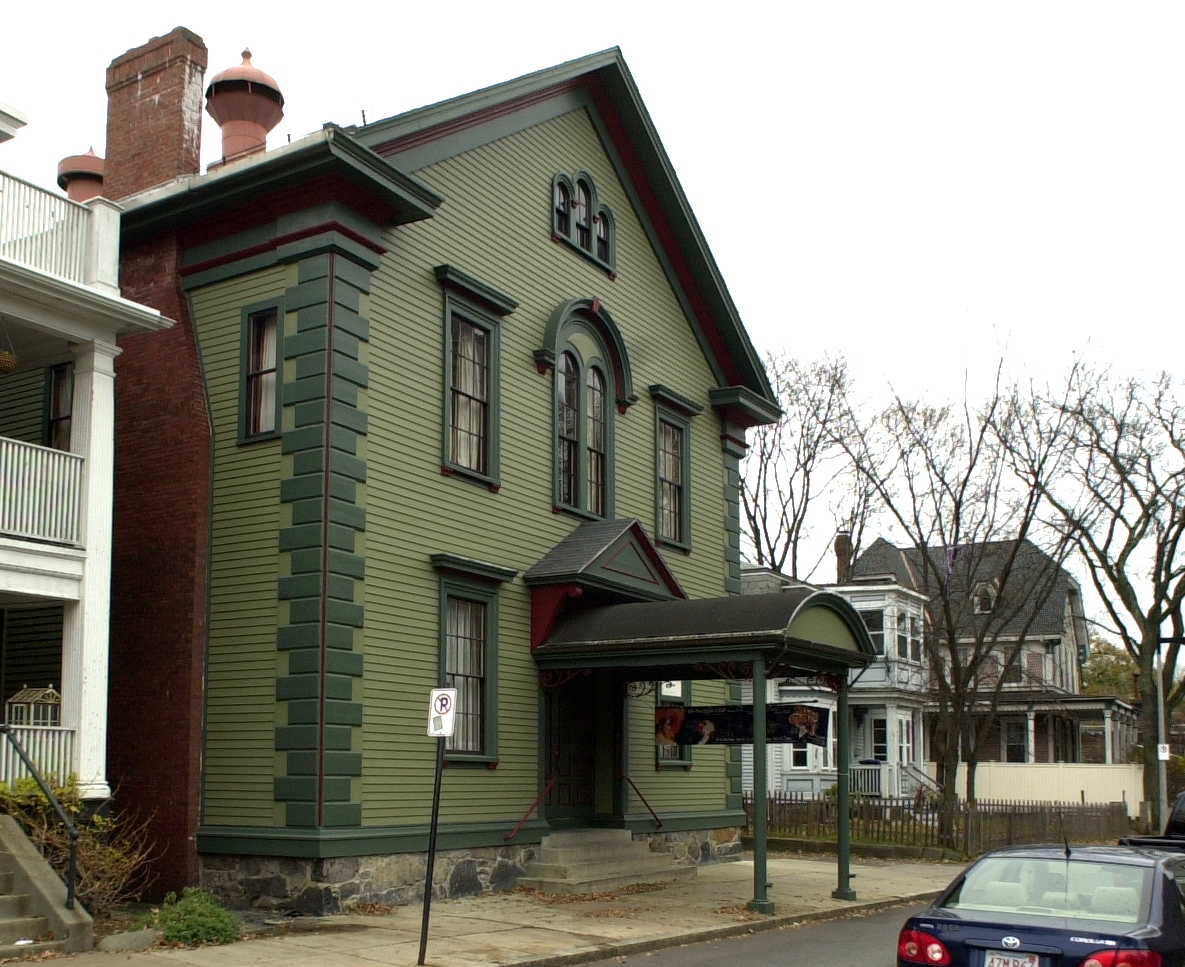

- Location within Massachusetts
- Location: 7A Eliot St., Boston, Massachusetts
- Coordinates: 42°18′37.3″N 71°6′57.8″W
- Area: less than one acre
- Built: 1832
- Architectural style: Greek Revival, Italianate
- NRHP reference No.: 88000959
- Added to NRHP: July 15, 1988

Eliot Hall is a historic building at 7A Eliot Street in Jamaica Plain, Massachusetts, a neighborhood of Boston. It is sometimes referred to as "The Footlight Club," after "America's oldest community theatre," which owns and operates out of the building.

Originally built in 1832 in Greek Revival/Italianate style, the hall was slated for demolition by the time the club's members purchased it in 1889. Since then, it has served for over a century as the organization's home and performance venue. The Trustees of Eliot Hall were formed by the group in the 1980s to oversee renovations to the deteriorating building, saving it from closure, and in 1988, it was added to the National Register of Historic Places.

Currently, the hall is used as the offices and performance space of The Footlight Club, and is rented out by the club for private functions.

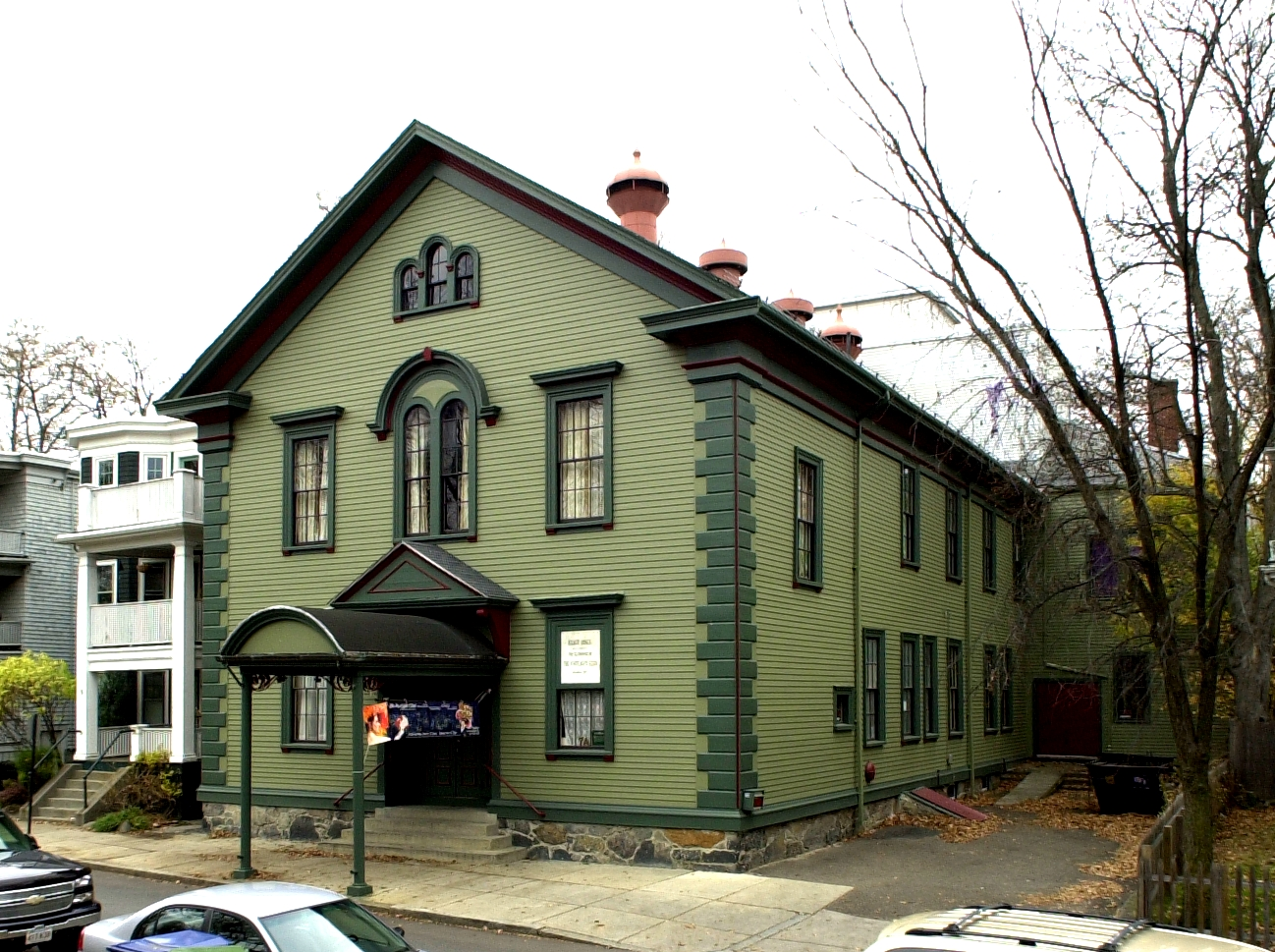

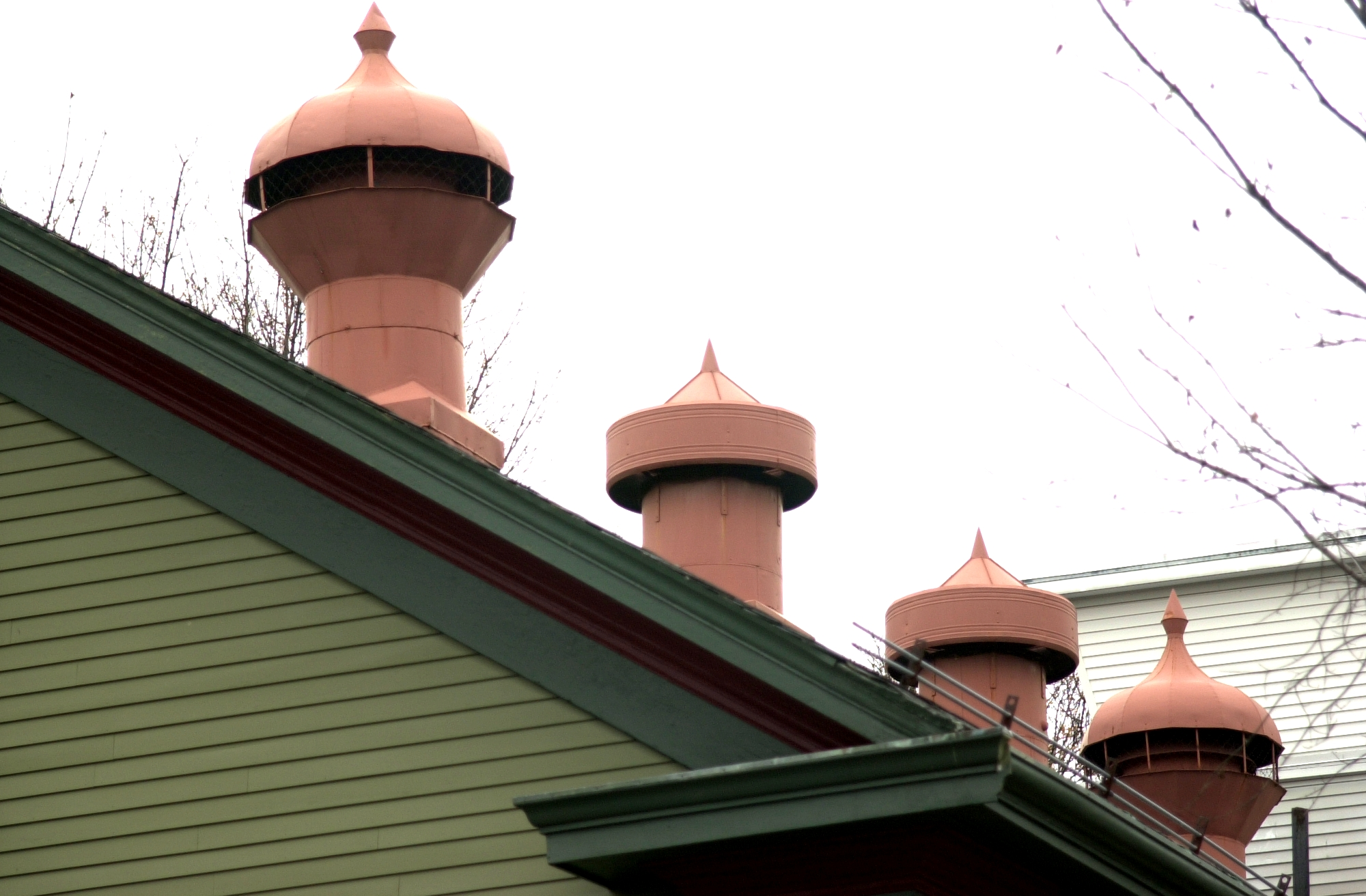

== See also ==
- National Register of Historic Places listings in southern Boston, Massachusetts
