= Marilyn Arsem =

American contemporary artist

Marilyn Arsem is an American contemporary artist. She creates live events, performances, makes installations, site-specific, interactive art. Her works were presented throughout Europe, Asia, North and South America, and in the Middle East.

== Life and art ==
In 1973 she graduated from the Boston University (BFA). She has performed live since 1975. In 1977 Arsem founded the Mobius Artists Group, an interdisciplinary collaborative of artists. She was also Head and Graduate Advisor of the Performance Art Department at the School of the Museum of Fine Arts, where she taught performance art.

Since the beginning of the twenty-first century she has focused on site-specific art, responding to the history or politics of the country, engaging with the immediate landscape and materiality of the location. Sites have included a former Cold War missile base in the United States, a 15th-century hammam (bathhouse) in Macedonia, an aluminum factory in Argentina, and the site of the Spanish landing in the Philippines.

She took part in many festivals, and performed in different cities on over the world.

She was awarded the Museum of Fine Arts, Boston’s Maud Morgan Prize 2015. The award, a $10,000 cash prize plus an exhibition at the museum, is given every other year to a Massachusetts woman artist active for a decade or more.

2005

- 1st International Congress of Performance Art, in Valparaiso (Chile),
- 4th Philippine International Performance Art Festival, in Manila (Philippines),
- the 7th International Multimedial Art Festival in Odzaci (Serbia)
- the 13th Performance Art Konferenz: Die Kunst der Handlung 3: Kooperation in Berlin Germany.

2006

- International Festival “In the Context of Art/The Difference” in Warsaw (Poland),
- The 14th Performance Art Conference, Ho Chi Minh City (Vietnam),
- The Acción!06MAD Festival in Madrid (Spain),
- Là-bas: Peak Performance International Festival in Helsinki (Finland) and in the Trace Gallery in Cardiff (Wales).

2007

- National Review of Live Art in Glasgow (Scotland)
- DaDao Festival in Beijing and Hong Kong (China)
- The Ensemble of Women in Santiago (Chile)
- LIVE Biennial in Vancouver (Canada)

2008

- Asiatopia 10th Performance Art Festival (Thailand)
- Festival of Performance Art (Canada)
- ZAZ 08 International Performance Art Festival (Israel)
- National Review of Live Art in Glasgow (Scotland)

2009

- On the Way: ArTrend International Performance Art Meeting (Taiwan)

2010

- Live Action (New York)
- Chile, Uruguay Alumni Festival Internacional de Arte de Performance (Chile, Uruguay)
- France, Infr’Action Festiwal International d’Arte in Sète (France)
- Montreal Canada, Articule Galery in Montreal (Canada)
