= Art School Cheerleaders =

Performance art troupe

The Art School Cheerleaders were a performance art troupe that used cheerleading as a medium for satirical, political and social commentary on the arts and their place in our society.

== History ==
Originally existing as the SMFA Cheerleaders at the School of the Museum of Fine Arts from 1996–1998, the SMFA Cheerleaders performed at venues such as Banned In Boston, a benefit which included the mayor of Boston, and the Car Talk anniversary show: A Tribute to Click and Clack: Celebrating 20 years of Bad Car Advice. They were featured in numerous publications including the Sunday Boston Globe, the Sunday New York Times, and the August 1997 issue of Playboy, which featured an anti-censorship cheer that they had penned.

The SMFA Cheerleaders also performed on the main stage at the Art Now! March on Washington in support of the arts during the massive 1997 National Endowment for the Arts budget cuts.

Several of the Art School Cheerleaders were also members of Bad Girrls Studios, a popular artist-run Boston gallery that hosted numerous public art events.

The Art Cheerleaders were resurrected in 2007 in Richmond, Virginia by one of the co-founders of the SMFA group, Rebecca Goldberg, who pulled together and worked with Richmond artists from many genres to advocate for arts funding in the Richmond area. This iteration of the group received a Muse Award for Creativity in Business from the Virginia Museum of Fine Arts and was featured as the cover story for Richmond Style Weekly's 2007 year-in-review. The group separated in late 2008 after leading a parade through the City of Richmond commemorating the 30th anniversary of Richmond's oldest non-profit space for new art, the 1708 Gallery.
