= Art Complex Museum =

Arts center in Duxbury, Massachusetts, United States

Coordinates: 42.0440°N 70.6873°W

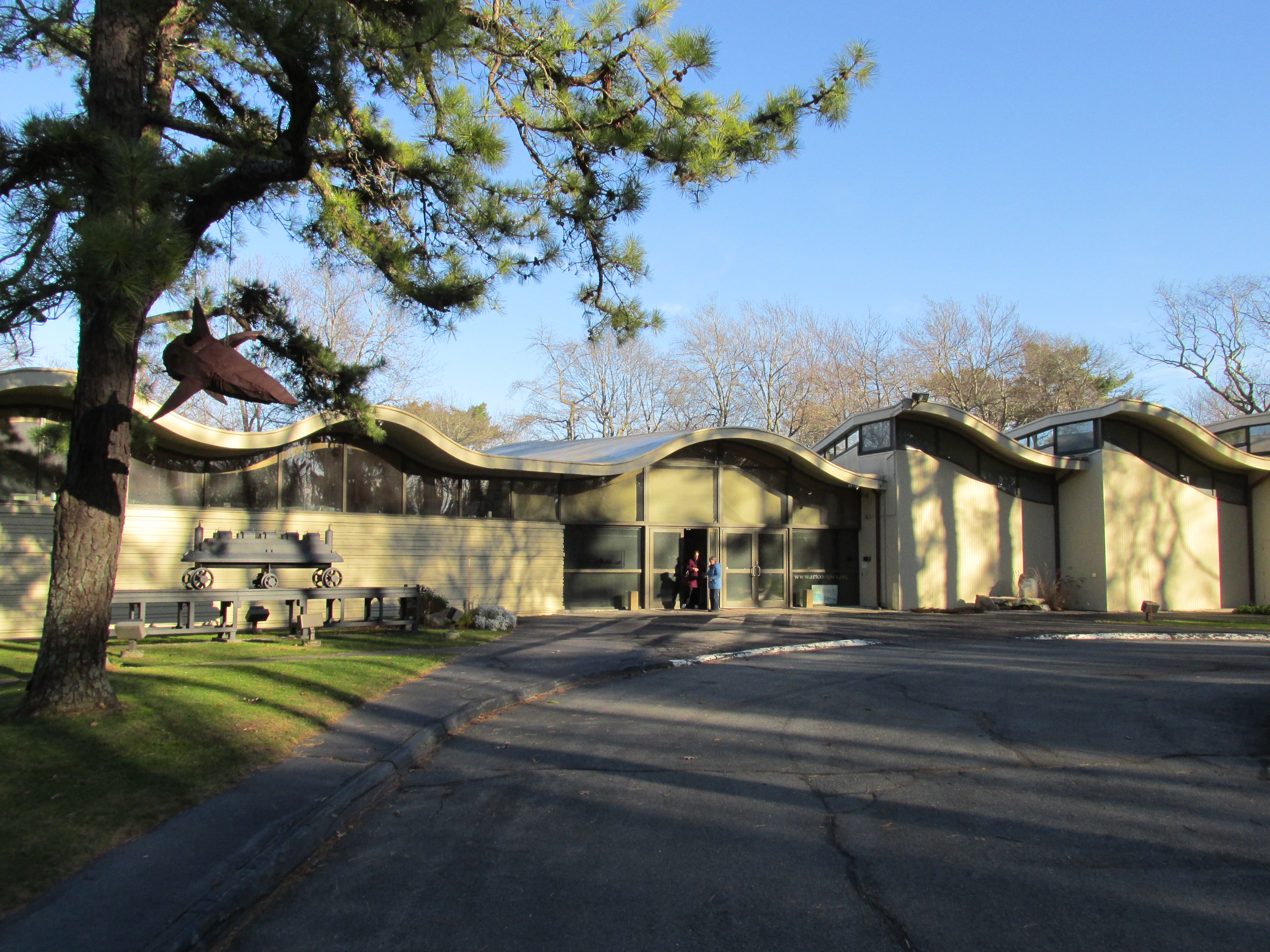
- Established: 1971
- Location: 189 Alden Street, Duxbury, Massachusetts, US
- Type: Arts center
- Accreditation: American Alliance of Museums (AAM)
- Collections: American art, Shaker artifacts, prints, Asian art
- Collection size: 8,000
- Parking: On-site
- Website: www.artcomplex.org

The Art Complex Museum, located in Duxbury, Massachusetts, 33 miles (53 km) south of Boston, serves as a regional arts center and houses the collection of Carl A. Weyerhaeuser (1901–1996) and his wife Edith Greenleaf Weyerhaeuser (1912–2000). The museum is free and open to the public, with support from the Carl A. Weyerhaeuser Family Charitable Trusts and friends of the museum.

== Description ==
The museum, situated on over 13 acres (5.3 ha) of woodland and open fields, opened in 1971. The master site planning was done by G2 Collaborative, of Waltham, Massachusetts. Works of sculpture are displayed on the grounds.

The museum features a gallery for rotating objects from the permanent collection, as well as temporary exhibition spaces that feature painting, sculpture, prints, and craft objects created by contemporary artists. A permanent Founders Room gallery portrays the background of Weyerhaeuser, his collection, and the building of the museum. The building also houses a reference library with over 5,000 publications. The museum specializes in Shaker objects, American paintings, Asian art (particularly Japanese ceramics), and works on paper.

== Tea hut ==
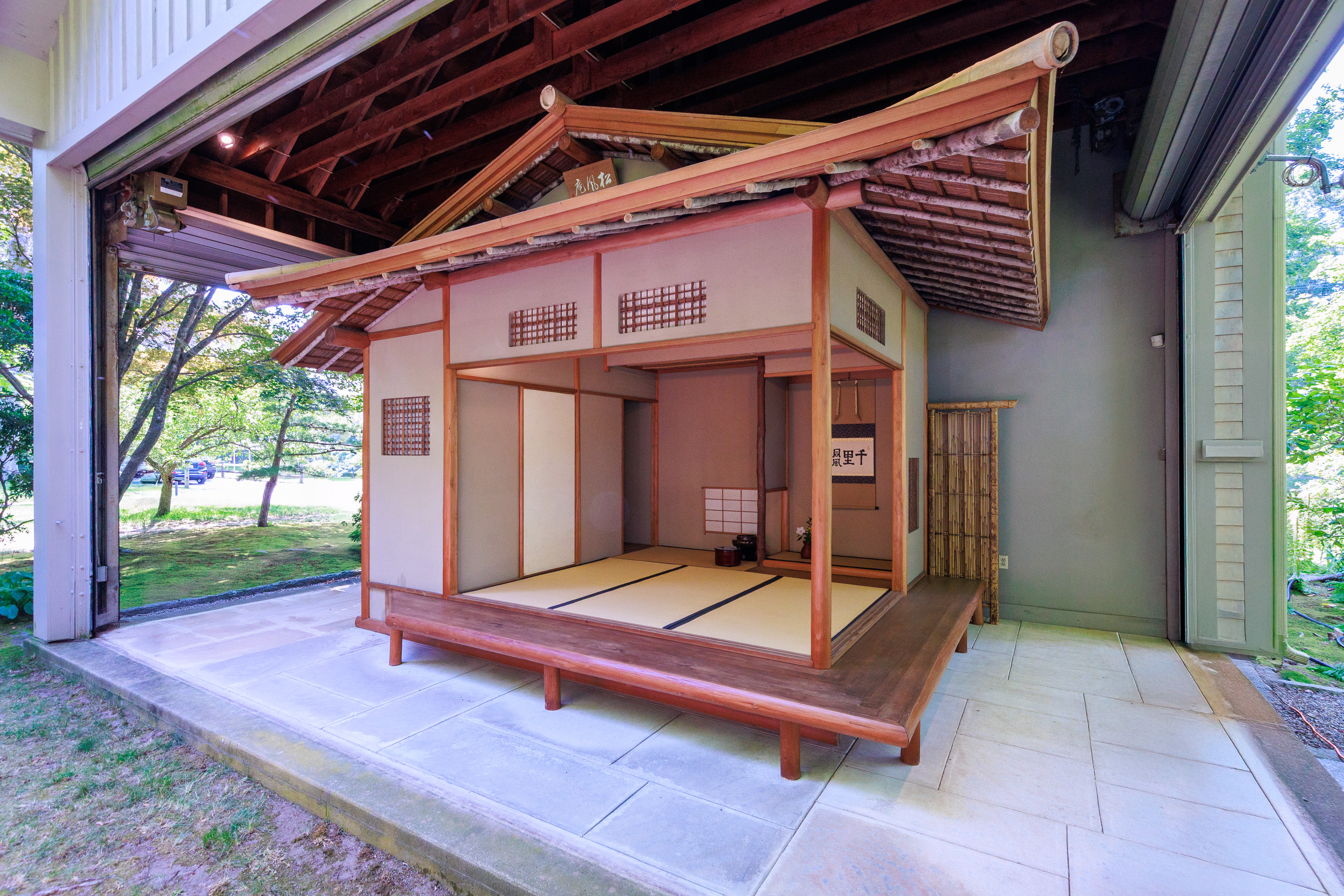
Wind in the Pines Tea Hut

A Japanese tea hut located on the site is used for formal Japanese tea ceremonies several times per year, which may be observed by the public. The tea hut was designed by Sano Gofu.

== See also ==
- Ture Bengtz, founding museum director
