= Frank Dengler =

American sculptor

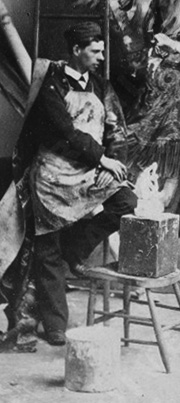
- Born: 1853; Cincinnati
- Died: 1879 (aged 25–26); Covington
- Occupation: Sculptor

Franz Xavier Dengler (known as Frank Dengler; 1853 Cincinnati, Ohio – 1879) was an American sculptor.

== Biography ==
He went abroad while young, studied in the Munich Academy of Fine Arts, and received there in 1874 a silver medal for his group the "Sleeping Beauty." He was for a short time an instructor in modeling in the School of the Museum of Fine Arts, Boston, but resigned in 1877 on account of failing health, and moved to Covington, Kentucky, and afterward to Cincinnati. Among his works are "Azzo and Melda" (1877), an ideal head of "America," and several portrait busts.

== Notes ==
Attribution
