= Spontaneous Celebrations =

Building and community group

Coordinates: 42.3175°N 71.1056°W

Spontaneous Celebrations refers to both a building in Jamaica Plain, Massachusetts, United States which acts as an arts and education center, and to a community group which is based there. The mission of the group is to create a cultural life through the arts, and especially through seasonal celebrations in Jamaica Plain and Roxbury, Massachusetts and education. Its classes emphasize dance, stiltwalking, trapeze, and other circus arts.

== History ==
Spontaneous Celebrations dates back to the defeat of the proposed Interstate 95 in Massachusetts extension through many Boston neighborhoods. The first “Wake Up the Earth” Festival, in 1979, was partly a celebration of the coalition which fought the highway. Spontaneous Celebrations was then founded by Femke Rosenbaum to continue the local organization and festivals, and eventually acquired the building around which its community and events center. Of its influence on the Jamaica Plain area, The Boston Globe says: "One Woman (Femke Rosenbaum) Changed JP" (Jamaica Plain).

== Festivals ==
- "Wake Up the Earth Festival" in early May,
- ‘Lantern Parade’ on Jamaica Pond just before Halloween
- ‘Tropical Festival’ in February

== Sources ==
- Eric Moskowitz, The Boston Globe, Dec 31, 2001, "9-11 CHILL WON'T FREEZE OUT FIRST NIGHT"
- Marc Larocque. The Boston Globe, Jun 1, 2008, "Paint for Peace program aims to stem gun violence"
- Inside Track, The Boston Herald, Monday, December 28, 2009 "All Together Now"
- Josh Kastrof, The Eighth Muse, "Wake Up the Earth 2010"
- Jamaica Plain Patch
