= James Billmyer =

American painter

James Irwin Billmyer (May 14, 1897 - July 9, 1989) was an American modern painter and illustrator.

== Early years ==
James Billmyer was born in Union Bridge, Maryland and received his BA from Western Maryland College. He continued his studies at the National Academy of Design, Beaux Arts, the Art Students’ League, Cooper Union, Maryland Institute, Baltimore Charcoal Club, and Baltimore Grand Central School of Art. Some of his influential teachers included John Sloan, George Luks, Frank Vincent Dumond, George Bridgeman, William De Leftwüch Dodge, Dean Cornwell, and Harvey Dunn. Billnyer was involved with the commercial art of periodicals and advertising, working as an illustrator for magazines such as “Cosmopolitan”, “Family Circle”, “House and Garden”, “Ladies Home Journal”, “Parents Magazine”, and Collier’s "Good Housekeeping”. In 1931, he became a member of the American Society of Illustrators.

== Work ==
Billmyer travelled extensively in Latin and Central America, Canada, the Near East, and Europe, exploring the history and cultures of these locations, which ultimately impacts his work. In the 1950s and 1960s, he was a part of the 10th Street galleries scene. For twelve years, he studied plastics under the tutelage of Hans Hofmann in New York and Provincetown. Hofmann showed him the importance of objects moved out from the canvas and resolved back into it. This type of painting that deals with multiple rhythms, colors, and angles, offers viewers a higher-dimensional experience. Billmyer has created patterns in and out of divided planes that go in independent directions before receding back into the canvas, which is his unique adaption of Hofmann’s methods. Many of his patterns and forms appear in the film “The Hypercube: Projections and Slicing.” Billmyer has taught and lectured at the New York School of Interior Design, The Hudson River School, Spellman College, Miami Art Center, the Naskeay School, Maine, and his own New York School.
