= Footlight Club =

Community theater group in USA

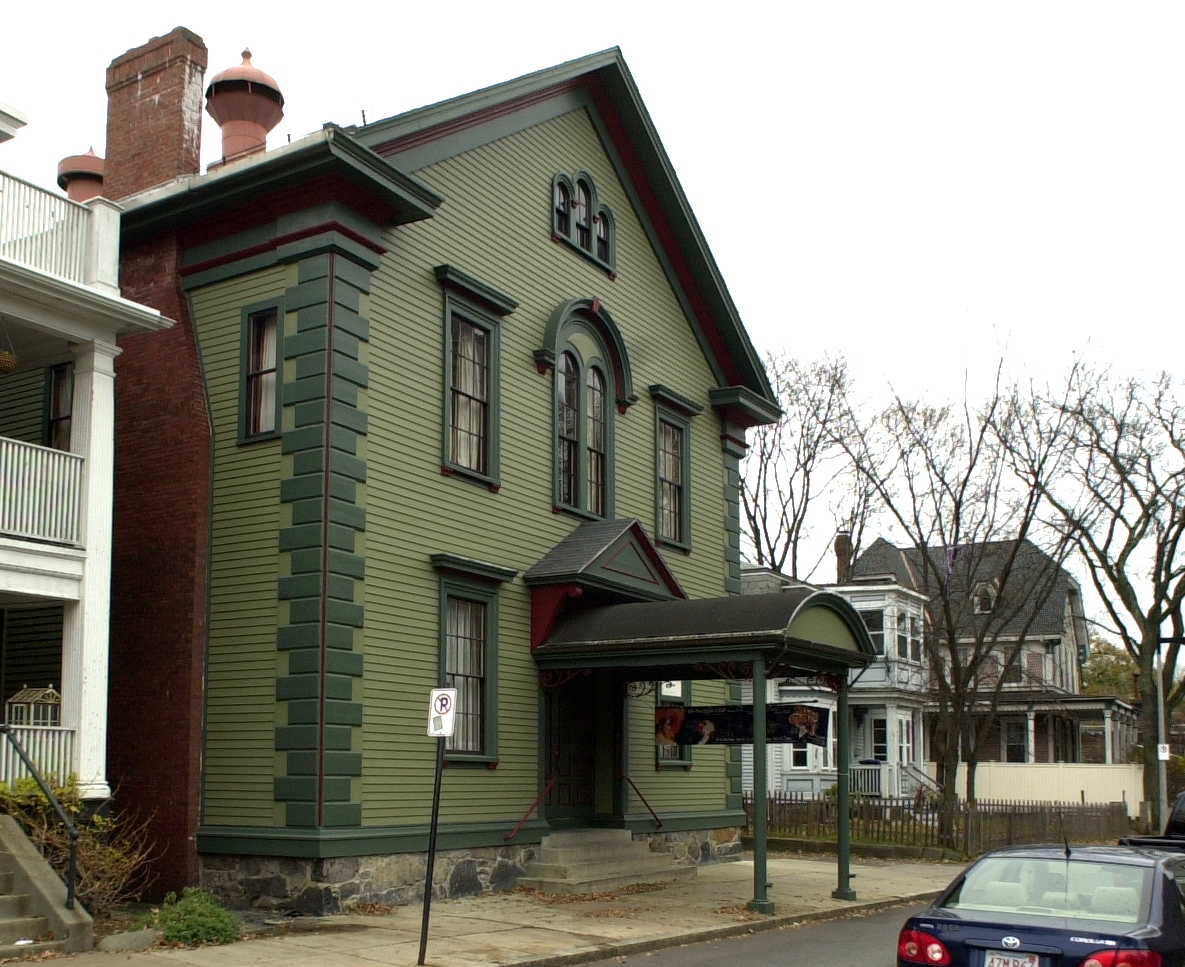
Eliot Hall, home of The Footlight Club

The Footlight Club is the oldest continuously running community theater group in the United States of America, having performed every year since 1877. It is a non-profit organization, incorporated as such in 1927.

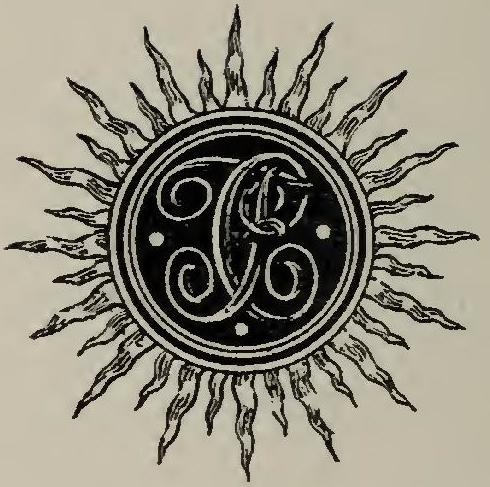
1892 Logo of The Footlight Club

Based in the Jamaica Plain neighborhood of Boston, the club currently owns and resides in historic Eliot Hall, which its members purchased in 1889 to provide a home for performances and save the building from demolition.

The Footlight's fundraising projects featured as a part of Boston's social life; there was a dining room in Eliot Hall where benefit dinners were held after theater productions.
