= Helidon Xhixha =

Albanian sculptor

- Born: December 1970 (age 55); Durrës, Albania
- Known for: Sculpture
- Awards: Public Medal, 2016 London Design Biennale
- Website: www.xhixhahelidon.com

Helidon Xhixha is a contemporary artist born in Durrës, Albania, in December 1970. Xhixha is known for his stainless steel sculptures, which is often fused with other mediums such as marble or brass.

== Early life and education ==
Born into a family of artists, Xhixha inherited his interest for the Fine Arts and passion for sculpting from his father, whom among other things, was a state portraitist for the Albanian government. Following secondary school he first attended and graduated from the Academy of Arts in Tirana, where he was a part of a rising period for Albanian art. He then moved to Italy, where he attended the Brera Art Academy of Milan in 1991. In 1998 Xhixha was awarded a scholarship to Kingston University, London, where he developed techniques in engraving, sculpting and photography. Graduating from the Brera Academy in February 1999 his creations included works in Murano glass and sculptures in stainless steel using innovative and specialised techniques. He is known for his use of polished stainless steel in his sculptures.

== Works ==
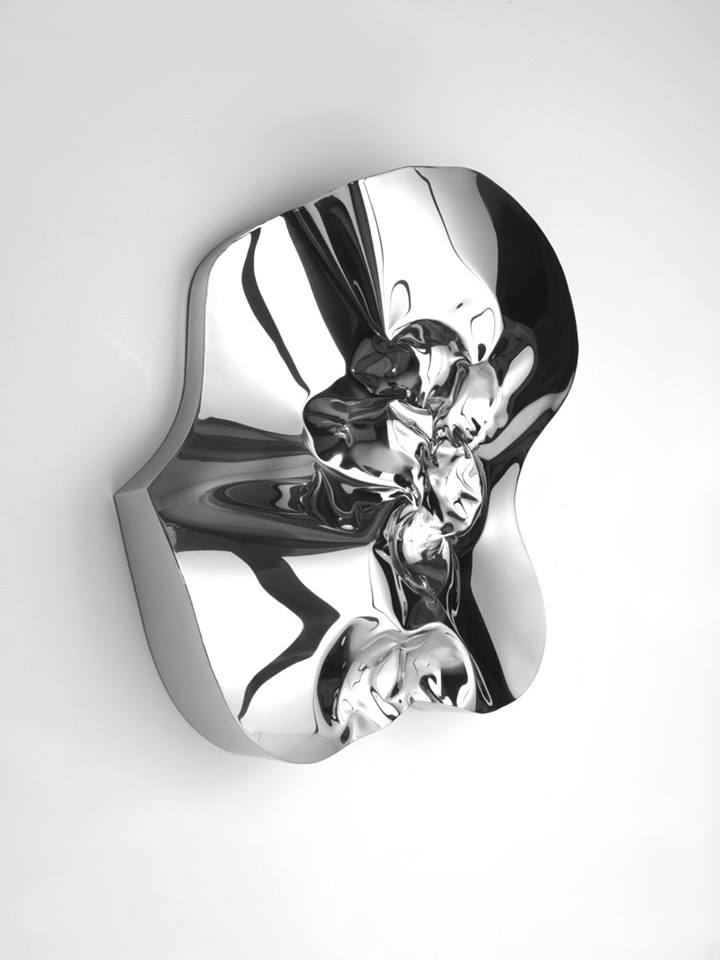
An example of Xhixha's stainless steel sculpture work

=== 2000s ===
In 2003, Xhixha sculpted the work Monument to the Prancing Horse, a work inspired by the logo of the sports car producer Ferrari. It was initially displayed on the grounds of the Gallerio del Vento, and is now located in the Rotonda Via Grizzaga of Maranello, Italy. In June 2007, Xhixha presented a sculpture at the Cornice Venice International Art Fair to pay tribute to the victims of 9/11. The six-meter-tall monument entitled Renaissance of the Twin Towers has been exhibited in numerous cultural capitals including Florence and Berlin. Utilising the imagery of the American Flag, the work becomes a symbol of civilisation whilst invoking contemporary ideas like those explored by Jasper Johns and Donald Judd.

=== 2010s ===
In the early 2010s, Xhixha began producing sculpture works inspired by Dubai and the UAE. He initially visited Dubai in 2001, but delivered his first public monument to the city in 2012, entitled Elliptical Energy. He then exhibited at the festival "Design Days Dubai". In 2014 Xhixha collaborated with PMG, located on Sunny Isles Beach, Florida. The building was designed by Uruguayan architect Carlos Ott, and Xhixha was commissioned to make a sculpture for each of the 68 residential units, stating to The New York Times that he envisioned the project as "my very own private museum."

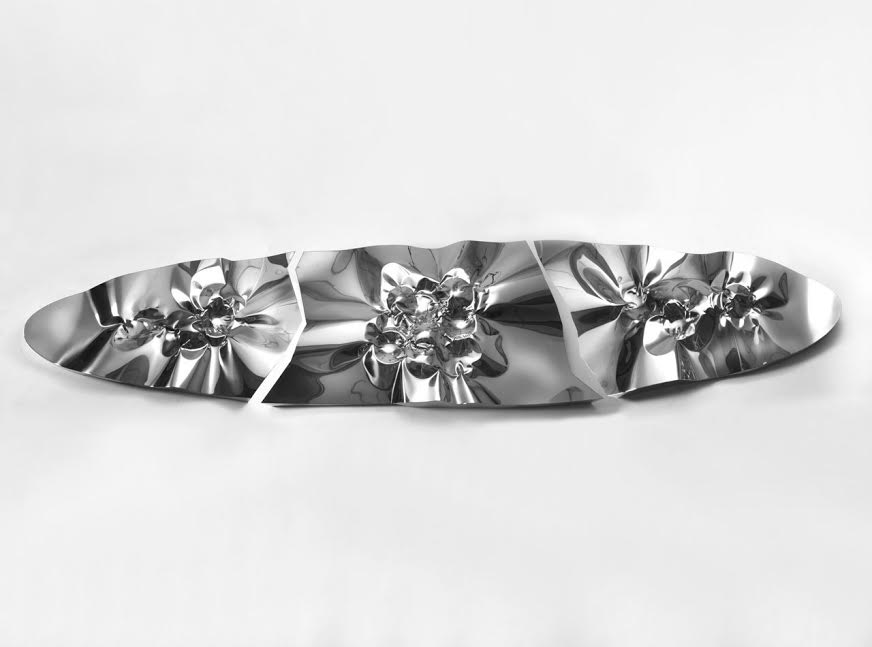
Untitled, 2014

In addition to this, Xhixha's five meter tall sculpture entitled Vela was unveiled in June 2014 at the New Yacht Club of Monaco. The monument, sculpted in 316 marine grade, mirror polished stainless steel, resembles a sail and stands tall next to the entrance of the club house at Quay level. The piece is inspired by the call of the sea, the contrast between life on land and at sea, between home and the unknown, and the passion for adventure. In London, Xhixha started a collaboration with the ContiniArtUK gallery, exhibiting his artworks in their space located in Mayfair.

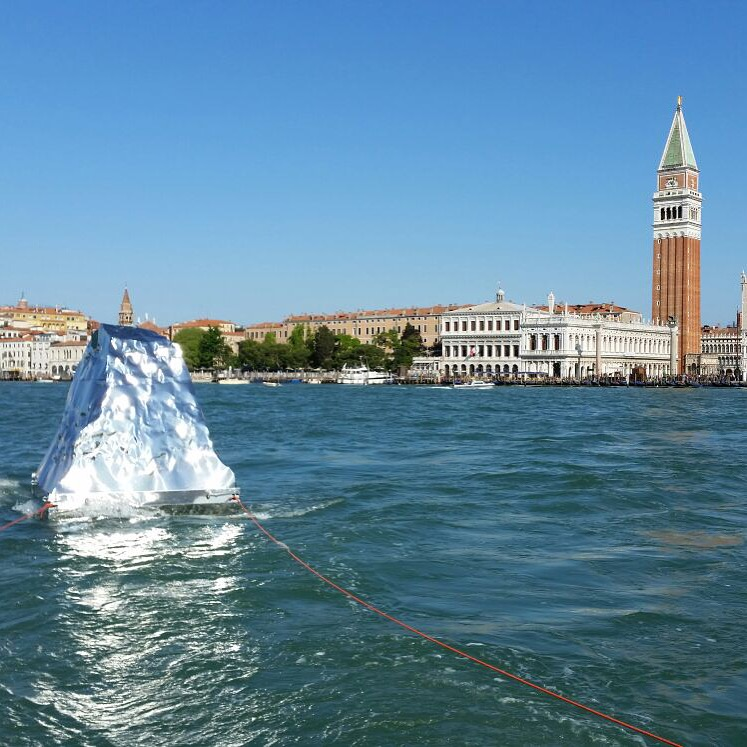
Iceberg by Helidon Xhixha

In 2015 Xhixha created the work Iceberg for the 56th Venice Biennale, a monumental mirrored polished stainless steel sculpture that was left floating in the Venice lagoon until it moored to San Servolo Island. It reflected the city of Venice and its endangered water environment, while at the same time, emphasising the growing threat of global warming and its effect on the sea level rise. Xhixha also installed another two monument sculptures on San Servolo Island, Pillars of Light and The Four Elements.

Later in 2015 Helidon Xhixha installed Everlasting at the Milan Malpensa Airport, Milan, Italy. Twelve pillars, made of polished stainless steel, stood before twelve panels depicting Leonardo da Vinci's The Last Supper painting. Each stainless steel column represented one of the twelve apostles. In contrast, Xhixha also created a column made of Corten steel to depict Judas Iscariot, the traitor.

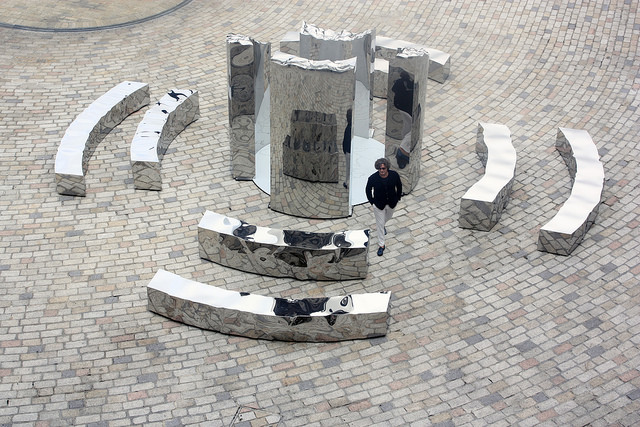
Bliss by Helidon Xhixha

In 2016, Xhizha's sculptures were the subject of a solo outdoor exhibition in Pietrasanta, Italy entitled Shining Rock, in collaboration with Contini Art UK and the Bozzetti Museum. The works fused white marble, bronze, and stainless steel, and according to Daen Huse, "Keeping in mind his signature of distortion ... Helidon’s inspiration for fusioning marble and steel ... originates from the mythological protagonists whose mysterious legends still inspire many artists. Coping with reality and fantasy, the earth and the beyond, the exhibition of Helidon Xhixha is an alchemy of philosophical and scientific transformations." In addition, his work Bliss appeared at the first annual London Design Biennale, as a part of the Albanian pavilion. The piece combines polished stainless steel and benches, so that viewers can see themselves in the work. Xhixha's work won the festivals medal for public artwork. That year an additional public work entitled Endless Melody was placed in the Melody Tower Plaza Garden in downtown Miami, Florida with collaborating gallery, Rosenbaum Contemporary.

Between June and October 2017 Helidon Xhixha hosts a solo exhibition in the Boboli Garden's, Florence, Italy. In Ordine Sparso (In Random Order), where Xhixha explores the ideas of chaos and order through a series of thirteen monumental sculptures and installations.

In July 2023 he held a solo exhibition at the Palazzo Reale, Milan, entitled "La reggia allo specchio" (The Palace in the Mirror).
