= Fred Martin (artist) =

American artist (1927–2022)

- Born: Fred Thomas Martin; June 13, 1927; San Francisco, California, U.S.
- Died: October 8, 2022 (aged 95); Oakland, California, U.S.
- Education: University of California, Berkeley
- Years active: 1940s–2000s
- Known for: Painting, Arts Education, Art Criticism
- Movement: Post-War California, Beat era, and Bay Area Abstract Expressionism

Fred Thomas Martin (June 13, 1927 – October 8, 2022) was an American artist, writer and arts administrator, and educator who was active in the San Francisco Bay Area art scene since the late 1940s. He was a driving force of the Bay Area art scene from the mid-1950s until he retired from the San Francisco Art Institute. In addition to his artistic practice, Martin was widely known for his work as a longtime administrator and Professor Emeritus at the San Francisco Art Institute (SFAI).

== Early life and education ==
Fred Martin was born on June 13, 1927, in San Francisco, California, where his parents lived in an apartment on Geary Street. His father was an electrical engineer, his mother a homemaker. A year after his birth, the family moved to nearby Alameda, and later to Oakland, where he attended school. In his final year of high school, Martin decided to major in Decorative Art at University of California, Berkeley after a teacher determined his interests were more creative than scientific, although he originally hoped to pursue a degree in physics. It was during this time that he was first exposed to ancient Chinese art and visual culture, which have deeply influenced his own art.

Martin received a Bachelor of Arts degree from the University of California, Berkeley in 1949, at a time when painters Sam Francis and Jay DeFeo were also students in the art department. There, he studied with painter and theorist Erle Loran and WPA era painter Ray Scepter Boynton. Between 1949 and 1950, Martin studied with David Park, in addition to Mark Rothko and Clyfford Still, who were visiting instructors, at the California School of Fine Arts (now the San Francisco Art Institute). He returned to UC Berkeley a few years later and obtained a Master of Arts degree in 1954.

== Arts administrator career ==
Shortly after completing his graduate education, Martin was hired as the registrar of the Oakland Museum of Art, where he was also enlisted to help with various installation tasks. During his time there, he informally helped build its world-renowned collection of California art, and encouraged then director Paul Mills to identify and exhibit a school of local artists. Martin suggested his friends David Park, Elmer Bischoff, and several other artists, who Mills eventually grouped together as leaders of the Bay Area Figurative Movement in a historic 1957 exhibition.

In 1958 Martin became the Director of Exhibitions at the San Francisco Art Institute, where he oversaw the Art Bank, an innovative, membership-based initiative that supported the work of several generations of artists in the Bay Area. Assembling the works of painters, sculptors, and printmakers, including Otis Oldfield, David Park, Richard Diebenkorn, Bruce Conner, Joan Brown, Jay DeFeo, and Wally Hedrick, Martin organized exhibitions of Bay Area artists at local and national galleries and museums between 1958 and 1965.

In addition to serving as Director of Exhibitions at the San Francisco Art Institute between 1958 and 1965, Martin was Director of the college between 1965 and 1975; Dean of Academic Affairs between 1983 and 1992; and Vice President and Dean of Academic Affairs Emeritus 1992–2016. Martin's decades-long tenure at SFAI has placed him at the center of the Bay Area Art scene as an influential artist and mentor.

== Artistic style ==
When Martin began painting in the late 1940s, he used oil paint or house paint to create semi-abstracted scenes based on real and imagined imagery. At times, these works ventured into action painting; other works, however, were created with a Chinese sumi brush, and focused more on calligraphic brushstrokes as figures and objects developed among various textures. Writing on Martin's work in a 1973 SFMoMA catalog, curator Suzanne Foley notes that his artistic style developed as he was studying with David Park, who emphasized "compositional simplicity", while also receiving "the greatest direction" from the "beat ambiance" of the time, which spoke to "Fred Martin's sensitivity".

Martin's work reflects his broad and diverse range of interests, including Jungian psychology. Over the years, much of his art has contained autobiographical details often in the form of symbols or anthropomorphic imagery. Poppies, for example, represent his first wife, Jean, who was also an artist, while grain, seeds, and phallic symbols allude to regeneration.

== Personal life and death ==
Martin died in Berkeley, California, on October 8, 2022, at the age of 95.

== Partial bibliography ==
=== Artist's books ===
Throughout his career, Martin has often incorporated text in his paintings, drawings, collages, and lithographs.

At times, these experiments have led to limited edition artist's books such as:

- Belulah Land (San Francisco: Crown Point Press, 1966). According to Martin, this book of etchings is titled after the place where "the good go to wait outside heaven" in John Bunyan's The Pilgrim's Progress
- Log of the Sun Ship (San Francisco: Crown Point Press, 1969)
- Liber Studiorum, (Oakland, Green Gates Press, 1973)
- A Travel Book (San Francisco: Arion Press, 1976)
- From an Antique Land (Oakland: Green Gates Press, 1979)

=== Art criticism and writing ===
In addition to creating artist's books, Martin worked as a columnist for ARTWEEK magazine, where he was a consulting editor from 1976 to 1992. He began writing on art early on in his career. In the 1960s, for example, he contributed reviews, features, and essays for leading art periodicals like Artforum, Art International, and Art Journal. Throughout his career as an arts administrator and educator, Martin also supported other Bay Area artists by writing on their works for various publications, and continues to be cited by curators and researchers who are revisiting the region's twentieth-century artistic circles. For instance, Martin wrote on Wally Hedrick's work for an exhibition catalog coinciding with his show at Pavilion Gallery (1967) and later contributed the main essay for the book published in conjunction with Jay DeFeo's 1969 exhibitions at the Pasadena Art Museum and San Francisco Museum of Modern Art.

== Howl reading and the Six Gallery ==
In the late 1950s, Martin was loosely associated with a group of artists who were living and working in the North Beach neighborhood of San Francisco such as Jay DeFeo and Wally Hedrick, who were married, Joan Brown, Manuel Neri, Bernice Bing, and Deborah Remington. In 1954 Hedrick and Remington co-founded the Six Gallery, with four other artists and poets.

A year later, Martin was invited to exhibit there. His first solo show of three at the independent art space included mixed-media abstract sculptures that poet and Six Gallery co-founder Michael McClure described as "pieces of surrealist furniture," miniature oil paintings on masonite, and a few larger paintings. While Martin's exhibition was on view, the gallery hosted an evening of Beat poets, including Allen Ginsberg, who debuted his seminal poem Howl. Martin's paintings had been taken down for the night but his sculptures remained on the makeshift stage where each poet read. According to writer Rebecca Solnit, who interviewed Martin, the tiny paintings were in response to "his feeling that making large-scale paintings was too much like painting walls." Martin's small-scale paintings were priced between 50 cents and $1.50, and DeFeo wrote the prices on the back of each painting. Several of his friends, David Park, Elmer Bischoff, Joan Brown, and Manuel Neri, among others, purchased works from the show.

== Notable exhibitions ==
=== Solo shows ===
- Martin's first solo exhibition was organized by Contemporary Gallery in Sausalito, California in 1949
- Six Gallery, San Francisco (1955;1956;1957)
- Oakland Museum of California (1958)
- Dilexi Gallery, San Francisco (1961;1967;1968)
- Minami Gallery, Tokyo (1963)
- M.H. de Young Memorial Museums, San Francisco (1964)
- Royal Marks Gallery, New York (1965;1966;1968)
- San Francisco Museum of Modern Art (1973)
- San Jose Museum of Art (1980)
- College of Art, Shanghai University, China (1995)
- Retrospective, Oakland Museum of California (2003)
- China Academy of Art Museum, Hangzhou, China (2017)
- Fred Martin Beulah Land, Crown Point Press (2019)

=== Group shows ===
- "Paintings by Sam Francis, Wally Hedrick and Fred Martin; Sculpture by Wally Hedrick and Manuel Neri," San Francisco Museum of Modern Art (1959)
- "Places-A Collaboration of Four Artists: John Caplans, Wally Hedrick, Fred Martin and Daniel Shapiro" San Francisco Museum of Modern Art (1962)
- Arts of San Francisco: Painting and Sculpture, San Francisco Museum of Modern Art (1962)
- "Corridor: Fred Martin, Roy De Forest, Tony DeLap, Nell Sinton," San Francisco Museum of Modern Art (1963)
- "Current Painting and Sculpture of the Bay Area," Stanford Museum, Stanford University (1964)
- "Painters Behind Painters," California Palace of the Legion of Honor, San Francisco (1967)
- "Extraordinary Realities" Whitney Museum of American Art, New York (1973)
- "Brooklyn Museum Print Biennial," (1975)
- "Directions in Bay Area Painting: A Survey of Three Decades," Richard L. Nelson Gallery, University of California, Davis (1984)
- "Oh How Much It Hurt: Fred Martin and Friends in the Fifties," Ever Gold Gallery (2014)
- "Way Bay", Berkeley Art Museum and Pacific Film Archive, Berkeley, California (2018)
- Positively Charged: Copier Art in the Bay Area Since the 1960s, San Francisco Center for the Book and the San Francisco Public Library (2023)

== Public collections ==
- Martin's works are housed in museums across the United States including:
  - Museum of Modern Art, New York
  - Whitney Museum of American Art, New York
  - Fogg Museum at Harvard University
  - Minneapolis Institute of Art
  - Minnesota Museum of American Art
  - Utah Museum of Fine Arts, Utah University
  - San Francisco Museum of Modern Art
  - The Achenbach Foundation for Graphic Arts at the Legion of Honor
  - Oakland Museum of California
  - The University of California, Berkeley Art Museum and Pacific Film Archive
  - Iris & B. Gerald Cantor Center for Visual Arts at Stanford University
  - San Jose Museum of Art
  - Crocker Art Museum, Sacramento, California
  - Los Angeles County Museum of Art
- A significant collection of Martin's paintings and drawings was acquired by the China Academy of Art Museum in Hangzhou, People's Republic of China.
- A selection of Martin's papers (1949–1975) are in the Archives of American Art at the Smithsonian Institution in Washington D.C.
