= Wally Hedrick =

American artist (1928–2003)

- Bodega Bay, CA. 2000
- Born: Wally Bill Hedrick; 1928; Pasadena, California
- Died: December 17, 2003; Bodega Bay, California
- Known for: Painting, sculpture, assemblage, pop art, conceptual art, and funk art
- Notable work: War Room
- Movement: Funk art
- Spouse: Jay DeFeo

Wally Bill Hedrick (1928 – December 17, 2003) was a seminal American artist in the 1950s California counterculture, gallerist, and educator who came to prominence in the early 1960s. Hedrick's contributions to art include pioneering artworks in psychedelic light art, mechanical kinetic sculpture, junk/assemblage sculpture, Pop Art, and (California) Funk Art. Later in his life, he was a recognized forerunner in Happenings, Conceptual Art, Bad Painting, Neo-Expressionism, and image appropriation. Hedrick was also a key figure in the first important public manifestation of the Beat Generation when he helped to organize the Six Gallery Reading, and created the first artistic denunciation of American foreign policy in Vietnam. Wally Hedrick was known as an "idea artist" long before the label conceptual art entered the art world, and experimented with innovative use of language in art, at times resorting to puns.

== 1940s ==
Wally Hedrick was born in Pasadena, California. He came out of the military and car culture, first glimpsing the liberating promise of San Francisco bohemia in the late 1940s, then moving to the city permanently after seeing combat in the Korean War (1950–1953). Hedrick visited California School of Fine Arts (now the San Francisco Art Institute) in 1946. During this period in Pasadena, Hedrick formed the Progressive Art Workers with his artist friends David Simpson, John Stanley and others. The Progressive Art Workers was a pun for The Works Progress Administration (WPA) and the group functioned as a co-operative through which its members were able to exhibit their works. At this time, too, Vesuvio Cafe in San Francisco's North Beach district hired Hedrick as an action painter to work (i.e. 'make paintings') while a jazz combo performed:

"That was his job. He made these paintings and while he would paint the musicians would play along with him. He would go like this and they would go doodoo doop. It was very popular in North Beach. The guy would make four or five paintings in an evening."

== 1950s ==
Hedrick made an early break with the conventions of art training and art-making. "There were three directions an artist could take at that time," Hedrick says, "Figuration, Abstract-Expressionism. And this third thing, which was out of the surrealist and Dada tradition." Hedrick began "working out a form of personalized Dada", which led "perhaps to his most influential contribution to the course of Bay Area art: an elaborate kind of punning. The puns not only became titles...but appeared in the painting itself."

Hedrick's mature artistic career began with paintings of popular imagery—American flags, radios, television cabinets and refrigerators—years before the rise of New York Pop Art. John Coplans included Hedrick's use of popular imagery in 1951 in his timeline of the antecedents to Pop Art. Hedrick "began painting flags in the 1950s, before New York's Jasper Johns did. Soon after, Hedrick -- ever the anti-careerist -- painted many of those flags black to protest the Vietnam War."

In the early 1950s, Vesuvio Cafe, a popular Beat hangout, employed Hedrick to sit in the window dressed in full beard, turtleneck, and sandals and create improvisational drawings and paintings. Hedrick's figure, therefore, helped ushered in the Beat lifestyle which ballooned in the later 1950s; by 1958 tourists to San Francisco could take bus tours to view the North Beach Beat scene. Hedrick once confided to his student Jerry Garcia that "he and his friends were the real Beat Generation."

At the time, Hedrick was one of the first San Francisco artists in the early 1950s to work almost exclusively with metal. He began welding in 1952, and these efforts are considered the first kinetic-junk assemblages. Hedrick made assemblages and sculptures from beer cans, lights, broken radio and television sets, refrigerators, and washing machines he found in junkyards. "What interests me", he said later, is "to take garbage and make it into art, kind of ironic art." He painted over the surfaces with thick layers of gesso and impasto which incorporated the work into the aesthetic of action painting. He was particularly pleased when he could fix an abandoned appliance sufficiently that at least some piece of it would work and he could turn his assemblages into moving sculptures.

"Some of his most memorable sculptures came from crushing and welding beer cans together, or stacking and welding them...In 1956 he made the first light sculpture that I had ever seen; a fixture that responded to sound. Later on he had the piece on at his house during a Christmas celebration for which Wally put on some Miles and Coltrane on and the sculpture went crazy! I also remember his assemblage Xmas Tree Sculpture, that lit up and danced!"

Although using beer cans was popularized in 1960 by Jasper Johns, Hedrick began the practice in art many years earlier, during the early 1950s. One of Hedrick's favorite beer can sculptures "was made up of smashed beer cans in a kind of pyramid, as sort of a mountain, so I called it American Everest." The welded beer can sculptures "carried over until -- 1969."

During the 1950s, Hedrick's efforts followed two main paths: painting and sculpture. More specifically, between 1952 and 1958, Hedrick begins his kinetic junk assemblages, beer can sculptures and 'Black Painting' series. Not only do Hedrick's junk kinetic beer can sculptures, now all lost or destroyed, possibly rank as the seminal "kinetic junk sculptures...made before Tinguely", but also, Hedrick is one of the first American artists to oppose US intervention in South Vietnam.

=== Pre-conceptualist ===
Some artists at the time considered Hedrick a 'pre-conceptualist': "Wally's mind, I think... is of primary significance in this way. I think he's much more a preconceptualist than perhaps any of the others... the paintings, and the objects that he created are really more expressions of an idea." Indeed, Marcel Duchamp had influence on Hendrick's work as he put it; "Well, I can't say that I knew about Duchamp. I knew about his work....And it always appealed to me and I probably am a Dadaist, but a left-wing Dadaist, you know."

=== Korean War ===
In 1951, during the Korean War, Hedrick was drafted into the United States Army against his will, escorted away by US Army MPs without even having the chance to call his parents. "Wally must have been a problem for them, though, because Wally didn't ever do military things quite the way they intended...you told Wally not to do it, that's what he would do. He was stationed in Korea until 1952. During this time, his paintings and assemblages shifted from neo-cubism to metaphysics to political subjects painted in a cartoonish style and dealing particularly with the escalation of the Vietnam War.

=== Studio 13 Jazz Band ===
Hedrick joined the Studio 13 Jazz Band in 1952. The group was founded at the San Francisco Art Institute in the late 1940s by two members of the Bay Area figurative painters David Park and Elmer Bischoff. He played the banjo.

=== Peace (1953) ===
Hedrick, Peace, 1953, Oil on canvas, 18 × 14", Collection: Paul McCarthy, Los Angeles, CA. Hedrick "began painting flags in the 1950s, years before New York's Jasper Johns did."

In 1953, one of the earliest paintings of his career as an artist presented a crumpled American flag defaced with the word 'Peace'. Thomas E. Crow contrasts this work with Jasper Johns’s "anonymous stenciling", drawing attention to the way Hedrick mimics the flamboyant calligraphy found in the decoration of hot-rod cars. Crow sees the work in contrast to Johns's reticence, as a protest aimed against the waste of lives in Korea, and at Cold War adventurism in general. Additionally, Peace (1953), "demonstrates an intuitive understanding of 'language as symbol' which predates the present postmodern use (of language) by twenty years. Hedrick’s pre-pop paintings were included in John Coplan’s historical “Pop Art, USA," the first exhibition to attempt a collective look at the movement in the United States, presented at the Oakland Art Museum during September, 1963. Even after his Pop Art phase, Hedrick continued "his risk-taking forays into regions where, mostly, angels fear to tread".

In the late 1940s he experimented with light. By 1953 he had created a “light machine” that combined keyboard, glass, speakers, and homemade projectors and colored lights that responded to changes in pitch, register, and volume, which was an early precursor of the psychedelic light shows of the '60s—and years before the light shows of Haight-Ashbury.

=== 'A genuine beatnik' who helped usher in the Beat Generation ===
Jerry Garcia of The Grateful Dead studied with Wally Hedrick and Elmer Bischoff at San Francisco Art Institute. It was the only school Garcia would ever be proud of attending. Hedrick served Garcia as a model not only as a painter but as an expositor of a way of life. To Garcia, Hedrick was a genuine beatnik. Hedrick thought Garcia bright and hip, and advised Garcia to attend poetry readings at the North Beach coffee houses, such as the Co-Existence Bagel Shop, the social centre of the Beat community. It was Hedrick who turned the young Garcia on to acoustic blues and Jack Kerouac’s On the Road and all its attendant attitudes. On the Road changed Garcia’s life forever. “Wally taught me that art is not only something you do, but something you are.”

As "a genuine beatnik" Hedrick was employed at a 'beatnik' bohemian sitting at the bar at Vesuvio Cafe, a famous hangout in San Francisco's North Beach. Vesuvio Cafe employed Hedrick to sit in the window dressed in full beard, turtleneck, and sandals and create improvisational drawings and paintings. Hedrick's figure, therefore, helped usher in the Beat lifestyle which ballooned in the later 1950s; by 1958 tourists to San Francisco could take bus tours to view the North Beach Beat scene.

Although Hedrick once confided to Garcia that "he and his friends were the real Beat Generation", the seminal visual artists in the 1950s in San Francisco, including Hedrick, shunned the ‘beatnik’ label. None of them liked being called “Beats” and they especially abhorred the label “Beatniks”, a sobriquet of disparagement coined by San Francisco's famed columnist Herb Caen. As Bruce Conner stated: “I don’t know any artist that would call himself a beat artist…If somebody did, you’d consider him a fake, a fraud running a scam.”

=== The Six Gallery, happenings, and funk art ===
"The opening night was the big thing in San Francisco. The opening night and all the artists, mainly artists, went out there and those few people that were into socialites or whatever they were, they went out. And then after that, you could go out there during a weekday and there would be nobody in the gallery. Nobody gave a damn." -- John Saccaro

Made from what was known as the King Ubu Gallery ("an all poet thing"), in 1954, Hedrick co-founded The Six Gallery in San Francisco, California with David Simpson, Hayward Ellis King, John Allen Ryan, Deborah Remington and Jack Spicer—and by 1955, had "become the official director". Although "the activities of the "6" were poorly documented", the Six Gallery functioned as an underground art gallery for the members and a meeting place for poets and literati alike. "The Six" was a focal point for countercultural activity during a crucial transition point—unconventional artists were deep underground—partly because no audience encouraged them to emerge, partly because it was safer there. "The Six" delighted at the chance to defy authority. As the gallery director, Hedrick organized and participated in the spontaneous exhibition/poetry reading/performance events that were the precursors of the 'Happenings' of the 1960s.

"We didn't think of ourselves as a group. The other groups had a very strong group feeling, and they'd sit around and talk about taking over the world, or at least every art department in the Bay Area."

In the wake of the artist collective galleries such as Ubu and Six came galleries run by professionals.

"Hedrick was instrumental in transforming the cheery satire of Pop Art into the more outrageous bite of funk art." The birth of 'California Funk Art' can be found at the Six Gallery. Robert Arneson, the so-called "Father of the Ceramic Funk Art movement". considered Hedrick, "The Godfather of Funk Art".

Hedrick received his B.F.A. in Art from the San Francisco Art Institute in 1955.

==== The Six Gallery reading ====
"The Six Gallery reading" took place on October 7, 1955, at the Six Gallery, when Allen Ginsberg, at Hedrick's invitation, read "Howl" for the first time. The event has become nearly as much a part of the city's mystique as the 1849 Gold Rush or the 1906 earthquake.

Hedrick approached Ginsberg in mid-1955 and asked him to organize a poetry reading at the Six Gallery. At first, Ginsberg refused, but once he'd written a rough draft of "How", he changed his mind. An account of the night can be found in Jack Kerouac's novel The Dharma Bums, where he describes collecting change from each audience member to buy jugs of wine with Hedrick.

Hedrick's 'Six Gallery Reading' was the first important public manifestation of the Beat Generation and helped to herald the West Coast artistic revolution that became known as the San Francisco Renaissance.

=== Jay DeFeo ===
In the late 1950s, San Francisco became the beat poetry capital of the universe, but the visual artists who were part of the same epoch are less celebrated. The three-story building at 2322-24 Fillmore, where Hedrick and Jay DeFeo lived and worked was the unofficial center of the small San Francisco art world in 1955–65. Hedrick met artist Jay DeFeo, a student at the University of California, Berkeley, and they married in 1954. Jay DeFeo's best-known painting, "The Rose", was made in their Filmore Street apartment, took almost eight years to create and weighs 2,300 pounds, all paid for by her husband, Wally Hedrick.

=== Kinetic sculpture ===
When I arrived in San Francisco in 1957, I remember going to The Place at North Beach with Michael McClure. There was this assemblage by Wally Hedrick in the window. I think it was part of a stovepipe, there was a doll's head in the vent, and it had wheels; it was like a cart (with a cane on it). -- Bruce Conner

'The Christmas Tree' was supposed to have something to do with playing colors by light, but it was totally random as far as I could tell, just absurd. -- Bruce Conner

In 1958 one of his mechanical assemblages "attacked" a woman at the San Francisco Museum of Modern Art's annual Christmas party and holiday exhibition. His "Xmas Tree" was "sort of the pinnacle of the kinetic junk sculptures because I'd never attempted anything so complicated", built out of "two radios, two phonographs, flashing lights, electric fans, saw motor--all controlled by timers, hooked so [they] would cycle all these things." One of the record players played "I Hate to See Christmas Come Around". At the opening, which Hedrick refused to attend, he set a timer so that the piece "suddenly began flashing its lights, honking its horns, and playing its records." One woman who was standing next to the piece when it suddenly turned on found her fur coat tangled in it and then received an electrical shock. "It caused quite a sensation not because of its artistic merit, but because it attacked this lady, which I thought was very nice... I wasn't making it as an art thing. I was more interested in making a "thing", and if it attacked people—well I guess I knew it was going to attack...I knew it would probably attack because I laid the trap. So it entertained me; I thought the evening was a success."

=== Sixteen Americans ===
In 1955, art curator Dorothy Miller came to the West Coast. She included Hedrick in the 1959 Sixteen Americans show at the Museum of Modern Art in New York City, NY. Hedrick, knowing full well the importance of being on hand for the opening, gave his plane ticket for the New York museum exhibition and spectacle to friends, rather than participate. It would be 25 years before Hedrick figured prominently again in New York City, during the Whitney Museum of American Art’s, Beat Culture and the New America: 1950-1965 exhibition in 1995.

Not only did Hedrick not attend the 1959 Sixteen Americans opening at the Museum of Modern Art or even go to see the exhibition, he further distanced himself from the mainstream art world by declaring that artists such as Jackson Pollock, Franz Kline, and Robert Motherwell were too firmly rooted in formal traditions. Instead, Hedrick asserted, “You’ve got to have a deep sense of the human, and you have to have a political stance. Painting is not above politics. Anything that has to do with the soul also has to do with the stomach.

Anger, 1953–63, oil on canvas, 65” x 65”, collection of the San Jose Museum of Art.

In 1959, again recalling his Asian military experience, Hedrick painted "Anger" (or "Madame Nhu’s Bar-B-Q"), the first artistic denunciation of American policy in Vietnam. (Note: Under a black circle we read 'Madam Nhu Blows Chiang,' referring to the sister-in-law of South Vietnam President Ngo Dinh Diem and Chiang Kai-shek, the Chinese Nationalist leader who was driven out of China by Mao Tse-tung and established his own semidictatorship on the island of Taiwan. On the right side of the painting, occupying the viewer's main attention, Hedrick presents a huge penis, forcefully penetrating an organ that can be read either as a vagina or a heart.) Anger, visually equates an act of forceful sexual penetration with corrupt political manipulation. Explosive rage and indignation are symbolized by an atomic cloud serving double duty as the form of male and female genitalia perpetrating the deed."

In 1959, both Hedrick and DeFeo became original members of Bruce Conner's Rat Bastard Protective Association.

== 1960s ==
Hedrick and DeFeo's apartment lease at 2322 Fillmore was suddenly terminated (due in part to DeFeo's excesses) toward the end of 1965. Hedrick and DeFeo divorced in 1969.

The Black Paintings were Hedrick's protest against the Vietnam War. Hedrick took "about 50" of his early canvases and painted them black. Hedrick's Black Paintings culminate in 1967 with "War Room". This series "was an idiosyncratic protest, but a passionate one."

=== War Room ===
War Room is "a group of four eleven-by-eleven foot black canvases, each filling a wall of the room" then arranged "into a square...in the shape of a room...and a door to go in it." The installation has been described as a significant item of Bay Area art history.

During this time, Hedrick was accused of stealing paintings, including a canvas by Clyfford Still, from the San Francisco Art Institute, where he was teaching, then either painting them black or painting his own iconoclastic pictures over them.

In December 2008, Christopher Miles, art critic for the LA Weekly, nominated the War Room (exhibited at Mara McCarthy's The Box, March 21 - April 26,) for Best Show of the Year (2008).

Also, in December 2008, Walead Beshty, art critic for Artforum Magazine, nominated the War Room (exhibited at Mara McCarthy's The Box, March 21 - April 26) among the most notable Los Angeles exhibitions in 2008.

== 1970s (Wally's Fix-It Shop) ==
In the early 1970s Hedrick was fired from a teaching post at the San Francisco Art Institute, after circulating a petition protesting America's presence in Vietnam.

After the dismissal Hedrick began a period of self-imposed artistic exile, devoting most of his time to operating a home repair business (appropriately named, "Wally's Fix-It Shop") in the town of San Geronimo, California. This is an example of the way Hedrick "operates outside the busy highway of contemporary art". The small repair business proved moderately successful. Hedrick's repair skills were first recognized during the Korean War, when he was given the task of fixing radios.

His paintings of the 1970s were mainly crude black and white renditions of old mail order catalogue illustrations. It was also rumored he was the originator of the tag SKIDS which appeared on road signs in Northern California . He also put that in paintings later .

== 1980s ==
In the 1980s he shifted to large-scale canvases of rough and aggressive imagery, often sexual." From 1988 to his death, Hedrick lived and worked in Bodega Bay, California, with his long-time companion, Catherine Conlin, for whom, WWW (a.k.a) Wiggy With Wings was painted. went on to paint and practice conceptual art and continued the tradition of making "bad art" in the form of music, when in the gestation period of nine months, she led her band, Bedtime Story, in releasing Dream Therapy, an album West Coast Performer Magazine dubbed "the worst album of the year", a title Conlin proudly touts to this day.

== 1990s ==
Wally Hedrick, War Room, c. 1967, Exterior View. Installing Hedrick's, War Room at SSU in 2002.

Hedrick recycled the Black paintings—recycling being another recurring theme in his work—during the Persian Gulf War, slathering the older black paintings them with new statements in white acrylic paint like, "So damn, whose sane?".

== 2000s ==
After 25 years, The War Room was brought out of storage to be the centerpiece for the 5th Annual San Francisco International Art Fair in 2003, courtesy of Lincart. The work was described as "the most topical thing on view." In 2003, with new American aggression taking place in the Persian Gulf, Hedrick returned to making all-black paintings. On December 17, 2003, Hedrick died of congestive heart failure at his home in Sonoma County at the age of 75.

== Commentary and criticism ==
"I can remember in about 1959 or '60, the joke going around the art school in the city was, 'A garage man had hauled away Hedrick's paintings and said, 'I don't know what art is.' We'd all laugh like mad, you know, 'cause most of us weren't sympathetic towards Wally Hedrick's art at that time." -- Terry St. John

As early as 1963, John Coplans, the future editor of Artforum Magazine (January 1972–January 1977), would confess the "fashionable world of contemporary painting" (i.e. East Coast) unpleasant reaction to the independent, offensive, 35-year-old Hedrick: "there is little doubt that Hedrick is an original, yet the fashionable world of contemporary painting tends to reject Wally Hedrick's work out of hand." Its no surprise, therefore, “the pathos of Hedrick’s situation was that few not already converted were ever likely to witness Hedrick’s accomplishments."

Art curator Walter Hopps, in his forward to 1985 Hedrick's Adeline Kent Award exhibition catalogue at the San Francisco Art Institute, stated that Hedrick "decided to ignore the ideal of "career", "fame" and "greatness" to which his peers aspired, and settled for a simpler life, uncomplicated by openings and galleries and cocktail parties."

According to Artweek, he never ceased to creatively forged ahead, whereas "too many of the other iconoclasts of the same era have themselves become icons, cranking out homages to their own faded talents.

"Hedrick consistently refused to be interested in what he describes as a "high art look," which he then considered a waste of time and energy." Additionally, the subject matter and motifs of his art often included "rough and aggressive imagery, "painted in a fury that gains its edge from the blatant sexual rawness. Thus, Hedrick's "big, tough paintings are strong medicine...and disturbingly enigmatic."

== Significance and legacy ==
The cultural historian Rebecca Solnit in her 1990 book, The Secret Exhibition: Six Californian Artists, reasserted Hedrick's artistic achievements:

It is now possible to say that Hedrick was ahead of his time: the first American to protest the Vietnam War, the artist to paint flags before Jasper Johns painted flags, who made kinetic junk sculpture before Tinguely did. Hedrick was a forerunner of Pop Art, Bad Painting, Neo-Expressionism, and image appropriation. It might be more useful to view Hedrick as an artist who was of his time in a unique way, a maverick whose responses to the world showed it in a different light.

"Maybe the most important thing about Wally is that he could have been so rich and so successful and so famous," said Professor Rollison, a colleague of Hedrick's at The College of Marin.

He was described as an underground institution. "Wally and Jay's (DeFeo's) house on Fillmore was the unofficial first stop on the art itinerary of anyone important in the art world, national or international." said Carlos Villa.

== Career highlights ==
Hedrick's works have been exhibited in galleries and museums including The Museum of Modern Art, San Francisco Museum of Modern Art, Whitney Museum, Los Angeles County Museum of Art, and The M. H. de Young Memorial Museum. His work resides in public collections which include The Smithsonian Institution, The Museum of Modern Art, di Rosa, The San Francisco Museum of Modern Art, and The M. H. de Young Memorial Museum.

Hedrick taught at the San Francisco Art Institute "shortly after graduating (from SFAI). In 1959 he also stopped teaching as a form of protest against the war, and was eventually fired." Later, Hedrick taught at San Francisco Academy of Art, San Francisco State University, University of California at Davis, San Jose State University and INdian Valley Colleges, at the time a separate school from The College of Marin but governed by the same District administration., where he held Professor Emeritus status. His students included Jerry Garcia of the Grateful Dead, William Wiley, Robert H. Hudson, Angela Conte model for many of his female figurative works of the 1980's and 90's, William Allen and Mike Henderson.

== Group exhibitions ==
- (1948) Pasadena Art Museum, Annual
- (1953) Los Angeles County Museum of Art, Annual
- (1954, 1957, 1960, 1966) San Francisco Museum of Art, Annual
- (1956) Santa Barbara Museum of Art, 1st Biennial
- (1959) Museum of Modern Art, New York, Sixteen Americans, Catalogue
- (1959–61) California Palace of the Legion of Honor, San Francisco, Winter Invitational
- (1962) San Francisco Museum of Art, Places - A Collaboration of 4 Artists
- (1962) San Francisco Museum of Art, The Art of San Francisco
- (2011) Wally Hedrick and William T. Wiley, The Mayor Gallery, London. Catalogue.
- (2012) Renaissance on Fillmore, 1955–1965, curated by Michael Schwager. di Rosa Art Preserve, Napa, California
- (2012) The Historical Box Curated by Mara McCarthy, Hauser & Wirth, London, Piccadilly, May 23 – July 28
- (2012) Painting, The Box, Los Angeles
- (2013) SIGHT / VISION : The Urban Milieu, Gallery Paule Anglim, San Francisco
- (2016) Based on a True Story: Highlights from the di Rosa Collection, di Rosa, Napa, October 26, 2016 - May 28, 2019

== Monograph ==
- Gina Dorre (Editor), LG Williams (Author), Kelly Young (Contributor), Rebecca Young Schoenthal (Contributor); Envisioning The Dark Millennium: Wally Hedrick's Black Paintings: 1953 - 2003 (PCP Press 2003 & 2016) ISBN 1530215048

== See also ==
- Wallace Berman
- Dennis Hopper
- Jess Collins
- War Room (Wally Hedrick)
