= Situation Room (disambiguation) =

The Situation Room is a conference room and intelligence management center in the White House.

Situation Room may also refer to:

- Situation Room (photograph), a 2011 photograph by Pete Souza, taken in the White House Situation Room during the killing of Osama bin Laden
- The Situation Room with Wolf Blitzer and Pamela Brown, an afternoon newscast on CNN
- The Situation Room, a 2024 book by George Stephanopoulos

== See also ==
- Incident room, a civil defense term referring to a room reserved and equipped for the handling of major incidents
- The War Room (disambiguation)
