= Walter Askin =

American artist and educator (1929–2021)

- Born: 1929; Pasadena, California
- Died: November 18, 2021 (aged 91–92); Pasadena, California
- Education: University of California, Berkeley
- Known for: Printmaking

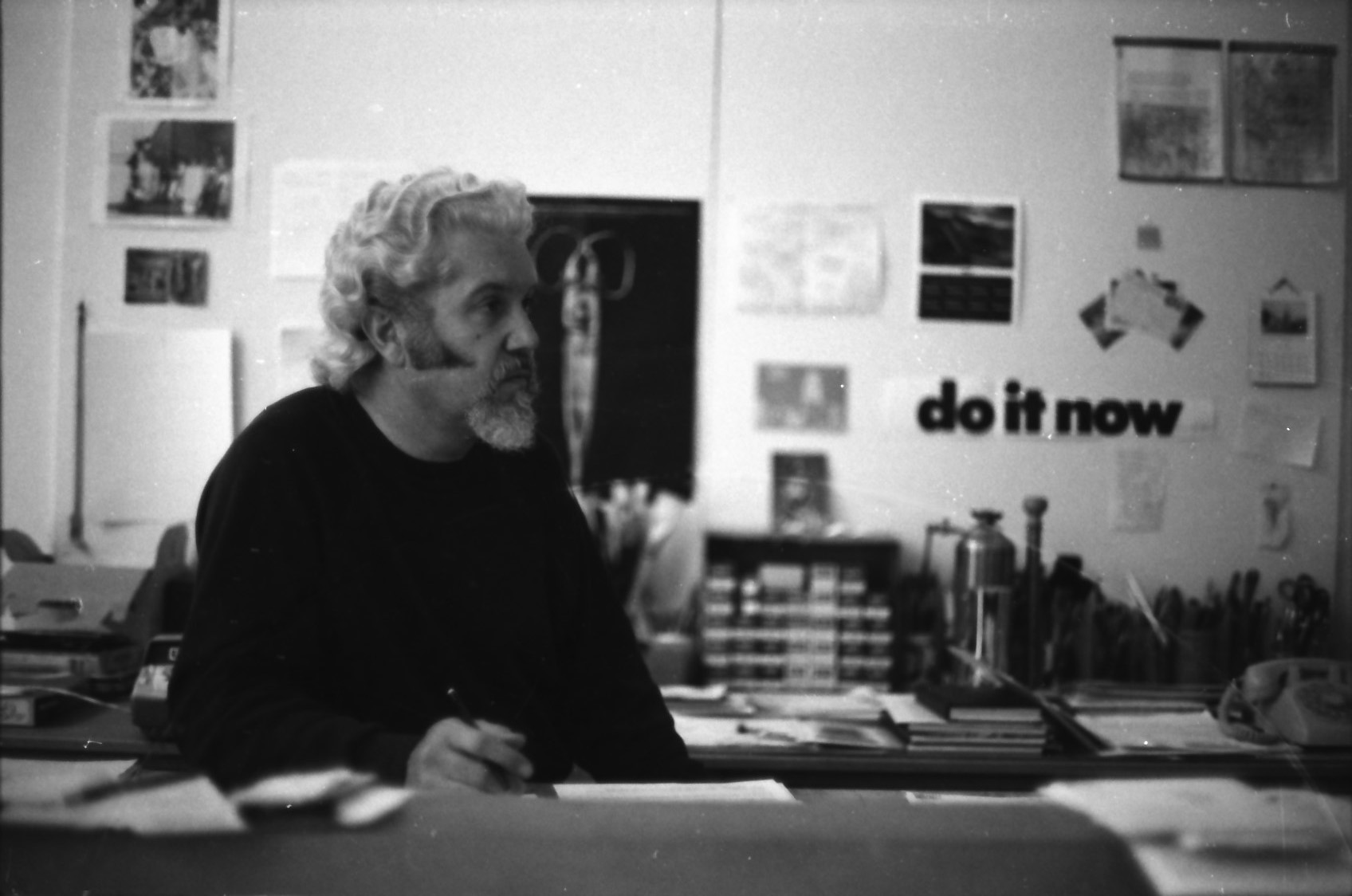
Walter Askin

Walter Miller Askin (1929–2021) was an American artist and educator, best known for his printmaking, who also paints and sculpts.

== Early life and education ==
Askin was born in Pasadena, California in 1929. His father was a draftsperson who worked for the city of Pasadena, and his brother was an architect. He learned to draw from an early age.

Walter attended Pasadena schools which were on the 6-4-4 plan - six years of elementary school, four years of junior high, followed by city college, which was called junior college then, and included the last two years of high school plus the first two years of college. Walter Askin, Wally Hedrick, David Simpson, Hayward Ellis King, and Paula Webb Clark-Samazan stayed on at Pasadena City College (PCC) for the first two years of college where they clustered together focusing on the fine arts and maintaining their altruistic interests within Pasadena City College's art program from 1945 until 1949 their backgrounds and focus being very different from the GIs returning from the Pacific and European theater who were going into commercial art on campus.

Askin studied art at Pasadena City College with Leonard Edmondson, and went on to study at University of California, Berkeley, under professors including Erle Loran, Worth Ryder, Walter Horn, and Alfred Frankenstein. At Berkeley, he was classmates with visual artist Jay Defeo, who would go on to marry his friend, countercultural sculptor and painter Wally Hedrick.

== Work ==
Askin's work has been described as lighthearted and humorous, with an undercurrent of a serious tone, including content on the "dichotomous relationship between the sexes and the criticism of art itself." He has been inspired by both Western and non-Western art.

In 1954, Askin received his first solo exhibition at the de Young Museum in San Francisco. Work by Askin was included in the 1956 group exhibition Recent Drawings U.S.A. at MoMA, the Kunstlerhaus Vienna, the Whitney Museum of Art and other venues.

In 2015, the Luckman Gallery presented a solo exhibition of Askin's art, describing his work as "rang[ing] from sardonic graphic works, large painterly abstractions, to vibrant figurative sculptures." In 2016, his work was part of the two-person show, Reality Reorganized: Walter Askin and Wayne Kimball’s Mysterious Discursions at the Brigham Young University Museum of Art.

Askin returned to UC Berkeley to teach in 1969 and 1970, and was Professor of Art at California State University, Los Angeles from 1956 to 1992, where he taught studio art and art history.

A recorded interview and transcript of the interview is available at the Smithsonian American Archives of Art. An archive of his papers from 1950 to 1992 is held in the Archives of American Art.

== Published works ==
In 1984, Nose Press published Askin's art book, Another Art Book to Cross Off Your List, which former New York Times Art Director Steven Heller described as "a profoundly witty, delightfully accessible satire" that "fit[s] squarely into a mama/dada tradition of artist as artist/satirist." His second book, True Fictions: The Search for Ecstasy in the Rubble of Contemporary Culture, Alas... Being an Aesthetic Ramble to Various Points of View, was published in 2013 by Floating Rock.

Askin contributed a chapter to The art of Richard P. Feynman : images by a curious character, a collection about physicist Richard Feynman and his drawings, compiled by Feynman's daughter, Michelle Feynman. The chapter details his acquaintanceship with Feynman, whom he had taught in a life-drawing class at Pasadena Art Museum (now the Norton Simon Museum).

== Collections ==
His work is included in collections of the National Gallery of Art, the Norton Simon Museum, MoMA Museum of Modern Art, the Albright Knox Gallery, Princeton University Art Museum, National Watercolor Society, Center for Book Arts, Library of Congress, Benton Museum of Art, SMoCA, Portland Art Museum, JMKAC, Albuquerque Museum, Worcester Art Museum, Harwood Museum, Museum of Texas Tech University, Hawaiian State Foundation on Culture and the Arts, University of Wisconsin–Madison. Libraries. Kohler Art Library Iowa University Library State of Utah Alice Merrill Horne Art Collection, Weisman Art Museum, and the Los Angeles County Museum of Art.

== Personal life ==
Askin died in November 2021, with his wife describing his passing as "Walter left another party without saying goodbye" to the Pasadena Star-News in January 2022.
