= Irving Blum =

American art dealer

Irving Blum (born 1930) is an American art dealer, gallerist, and curator. He is best known for his leadership of the Los Angeles-based Ferus Gallery and for organizing Pop artist Andy Warhol's landmark exhibition of Campbell's Soup Cans in 1962. He played a significant role in the development of the postwar Los Angeles art scene and helped introduce emerging East Coast artists, including Jasper Johns, Roy Lichtenstein, and Frank Stella, to West Coast audiences

== Early life and career ==
Irving Blum was born in Brooklyn, New York and moved with his family to Phoenix, Arizona during his youth. After attending the University of Arizona and serving in the United States Air Force, he returned to New York City in 1955. There he met Hans Knoll, co-founder of the Knoll furniture company, who offered him a position at the firm's showroom on 57th Street. While working there, Blum developed an interest in contemporary art through frequent visits to nearby galleries. He also befriended art dealer David Herbert, who worked at the Betty Parsons Gallery and took him to artists' studios, including that of Ellsworth Kelly, whose work made a particularly lasting impression on him. Following the death of Knoll, Blum decided to pursue a career in the art business and relocated to Los Angeles, California in 1957.

== The Ferus Gallery ==
In 1958, Blum purchased Edward Kienholz's share in the Ferus Gallery for $500 and became a partner of gallery co-founder Walter Hopps. With financial support from patron Sayde Moss, the gallery relocated to a larger space on North La Cienega Boulevard.

Under Blum's direction, Ferus became one of the leading venues for contemporary art on the West Coast. The gallery exhibited prominent California artists, including Ed Ruscha, Robert Irwin, Larry Bell, Ken Price, and Billy Al Bengston, while also introducing works by New York artists such as Jasper Johns, Roy Lichtenstein, Frank Stella, and Andy Warhol.

Blum first met Warhol in New York in 1961 after receiving recommendations from art-world figures, including curator Henry Geldzahler and dealer Richard Bellamy. During a subsequent studio visit in 1962, Blum saw Warhol's Campbell's Soup Cans paintings in progress and proposed exhibiting them in Los Angeles. Warhol agreed, and the series was shown at Ferus Gallery in July 1962.

The exhibition consisted of 32 canvases, one for each variety of Campbell's soup then available. Blum installed the paintings in a line on a shelf, evoking the appearance of products displayed in a grocery store. During the exhibition, a few paintings were sold individually. Blum subsequently persuaded the purchasers to relinquish their claims so that the group could remain intact. He then acquired the entire set directly from Warhol through 10 monthly installments of $100. Blum later sold the complete series to the Museum of Modern Art in New York City, and it is considered one of the museum's most significant holdings of postwar American art.

Blum brought Warhol to Los Angeles for a second show at the Ferus Gallery in October 1963, which featured silkscreen portraits of Elvis Presley. Between 1963 and 1966, Blum organized further shows for artists such as John Mason, Lichtenstein, Ruscha, and Elsworth Kelly.

== Later career ==
After the closure of Ferus Gallery, Blum founded the Irving Blum Gallery, which operated from 1967 until 1973, when he relocated to New York City. The gallery became one of Los Angeles's leading venues for contemporary art and presented exhibitions by artists including Frank Stella, Dan Flavin, Robert Irwin, Ellsworth Kelly, Roy Lichtenstein, Robert Morris, Jasper Johns, Oskar Schlemmer, Richard Diebenkorn, and Andy Warhol. Art critic William Wilson described it as "one of the classiest Los Angeles showplaces," writing that it represented "the final evolution of the old Ferus Gallery" and "put L.A. art on a par with the best international modernism."

In 1973, Blum partnered with dealer Joseph Helman to establish the BlumHelman Gallery in New York. When Blum retired in 1995, the gallery became the Joseph Helman Gallery. He subsequently returned to Los Angeles and continued working as a private art dealer and advisor.

== Personal life ==
Blum married art historian Shirley Hopps, the former wife of Walter Hopps. The couple had one son, Jason Ferus Blum, in 1969. They separated in 1974 and divorced in 1976. He is currently married to Jackie Blum, since at least 1996.
