= David Simpson (artist) =

American painter (born 1928)

David Simpson (born 1928) is an American abstract painter and educator, who lives in Berkeley, California. His work is associated with the minimalist, monochrome, and color field movements. Since 1958, Simpson has had more than 70 solo exhibitions of his paintings in galleries and museums worldwide. His paintings have been included in hundreds of group exhibitions throughout the United States and Europe. During the early 1960s Simpson was included in two seminal group exhibitions: Americans 1963 at the Museum of Modern Art in New York curated by Dorothy Canning Miller and Post-Painterly Abstraction curated by Clement Greenberg in 1964; that traveled to the Los Angeles County Museum of Art the Walker Art Center and the Art Gallery of Toronto.

== Early life and education ==
David Simpson was born in Pasadena, California in 1928 to Frederick Simpson, an interior decorator and expert on 19th century fabrics and furniture and Mary Adeline White, a housewife. After Frederick died in 1936, Mary supported Simpson and his older brother, Robert, by working at the National Tuberculosis Association. In 1952, Simpson met art student Dolores Debus. The two were married the following year in Sierra Madre, California. Simpson has a stepson, Gregory Vose, born in 1949, and a daughter, Lisa Simpson, born in 1953.

Simpson joined the Navy in 1945, when he was seventeen-years-old. For three years, he served as a Hospital Corpsman stationed near the Mexican border in El Centro, California. After staying on an extra year to help fellow hospital staff with the repercussions of war, Simpson left the Navy in 1949.

=== Education ===
Simpson used payments from the G.I. Bill to attend the San Francisco Art Institute, earning his BFA in 1951. He went on to receive his Master of Arts from San Francisco State University (then San Francisco State College) in 1958.

While in school, Simpson worked the graveyard shift at a gas station and managed the campus cafeteria to cover tuition costs. Simpson has said that studying under professors like Clyfford Still, David Park, and Elmer Bischoff helped him realize that he, too, could make a living teaching and producing art.

=== The Six Gallery ===
In 1954, Simpson co-founded the Six Gallery at 3119 Fillmore Street in San Francisco alongside Wally Hedrick, a neo-expressionist painter and integral member of the Beat movement; Deborah Remington, an abstract artist known for hard-edge painting abstraction; Jack Ryan, a poet; Hayward Ellis King, an artist who became the director of the Richmond Art Center, and Jack Spicer, a poet and faculty member at the San Francisco Art Institute. Before it was turned into one of the inaugural student-run cooperative galleries in the area, the space had been an auto-repair shop. Herb Caen wrote in the San Francisco Examiner on September 26, 1954 that the Six Gallery was "sponsored by six people interested in art, music, poetry, integrity and other worthwhile things." Many well-known artists, including Joan Brown and Manuel Neri, held their first one-person shows at the Six Gallery. On October 7, 1955, Allen Ginsberg read his famous poem, "Howl" publicly for the first time at a reading at the Six Gallery."Howl's" future publisher Lawrence Ferlinghetti, the poet Michael McClure, and Jack Kerouac were in the audience, but Simpson, home sleeping after a night shift at his gas station job, missed the reading. The Six Gallery closed in 1957.

==== Connection with Jay Defeo ====
In 1953, Simpson and Dee lived in the same house as Hedrick and his wife, the artist Jay Defeo (best known for her ten-foot masterpiece, The Rose), on Bay Street in San Francisco. During that time, Simpson and Dee ran the San Francisco Art Institute's cafeteria to help with Simpson's tuition fees. During their shifts at the cafeteria, Defeo babysat the Simpson's newborn daughter, Lisa. Defeo, who worked in numerous mediums including drawing, collage, photography, jewelry, and sculpture, was the subject of a retrospective at the Whitney Museum of American Art in 2013.

== Academic work ==
In 1959, Simpson accepted a teaching position at the American River Junior College, near Sacramento, California, where he taught for two years before joining the teaching staff of Contra Costa Junior College in San Pablo, California. In 1965. Simpson became an assistant professor in the art department of the University of California, Berkeley. Five years later, he was promoted to full professor with tenure.

After teaching at Berkeley for twenty-five years, Simpson retired in 1990.

== Career ==
Simpson has had three notable artistic periods during which he produced cohesive works of particular resonance and importance. These phases are the Landscape-Based Abstractions, the Relational Abstractions, and the Interference Paintings.

=== Landscape-based abstractions/horizontal stripe paintings (1955–1963) ===
"During the last several years I have been interested in paintings made up primarily of horizontal stripes and bands. Some of these appear as landscape—some as pure paintings. I've always been more interested in the painting than the landscape," –David Simpson, 1962.

From the beginning of his career Simpson has described himself as a reductive rather than minimalist painter. His reductive, abstract landscapes of this period were inspired by the level earth floor and color-smeared sky of the Sacramento Valley. Simpson has related these works to "Indian blankets, or East-Indian madras, or the American tradition of landscape." Their abstract glazes and references to fog and sky caught the attention of the critic Clement Greenberg, who included Simpson in his seminal 1964 exhibition Post-Painterly Abstraction at the Los Angeles County Museum of Art alongside thirty other artists including Frank Stella, Thomas Downing, Helen Frankenthaler, and Ellsworth Kelly. In 1958, Simpson had the first solo exhibition of his career at the San Francisco Art Association gallery, and two years later he participated in the International Sky Festival in Osaka, Japan, both times showing his horizontal stripes paintings.

=== Relational abstractions (late 1970s–early 1980s) ===
"I placed blocks of color bands right around the edge of the painting instead of in the center. I wanted to keep the center open. [It was] very different from the traditional American landscapes I'd been doing earlier. I wanted to create space so you had room to breathe again in aesthetic terms. I likened them to dense fog pressed up against a window pane."—David Simpson

Influenced by Piet Mondrian, Mark Rothko, and the Russian avant-garde, Simpson's abstract paintings of the 1970s and 1980s consist of flat, color-blocked rectangles, squares and other geometric shapes seeming to vibrate from relational energy. These meticulously envisioned paintings involve minute spatial calculations. They depict vividly colored geometric configurations in push-pull interactions of marked reverberation and intensity. Particularly notable works from this period include Red Square (1974), Barrio (1979), Quatro Camino, (1980), Five Square Rotation, (1982), and Intra Muros (1983). About Simpson's Red Square—which takes its name from Russian painter and geometric abstract art pioneer Kazimir Malevich's famous Red Square painting (1915)—Kenneth Baker wrote in 2001, "Each shape pulses with assertions of its own position and scale in the picture's internal space." In 2009, the Modernism Gallery in San Francisco held a solo show of Simpson's relational abstraction paintings.

=== Interference paintings (late 1980s–present) ===
In the late 1980s, Simpson began experimenting with interference paints, soon becoming fascinated with the mercurial characteristics of the medium. Interference paints, which have only six pigment variations containing micro-particles covered with titanium oxide, reflect and refract light, giving rise to nuances of color and optical illusions of depth. Using only one color pigment for each painting and a specially designed, hand-crafted trowel, Simpson applies on average about thirty coats of paint to each canvas, creating a modulated surface space with which the paint interacts in ripples and layers. In 2011, Simpson had his seventh solo show, Nonsense Poems, at the Haines Gallery in San Francisco, which featured 19 new interference paintings with one-syllable titles such as Blink and Ring. Three paintings of particular importance during this period are April First (2012), Enthrone (2013), and Mississippi (2012). Simpson has created hundreds of interference paintings since he began working with interference pigment more than twenty years ago.

== Critics and collectors ==
=== The Panza collection ===
Giuseppe Panza di Biumo (1923-2010) was a pre-eminent contemporary art collector based in Milan and Varese, Italy, and a major collector of Simpson's work. He began purchasing abstract expressionist pieces in the late 1950s before moving on to pop art, minimalism, and conceptualism. He spent the following twenty years amassing one of the most important private collections of postwar American art in the world—over 2,500 pieces by artists including Dan Flavin, Carl Andre, and Donald Judd. He exhibited the paintings in his 130-room villa in Varese, eventually even converting the stables into galleries for his growing collection. Dr. Panza bought his first Simpson painting in 1990. He went on to acquire over 140 of Simpson's works, mostly his earlier iridescent metallic paintings and then his later interference pigment paintings. Simpson has described Dr. Panza as simultaneously "supportive and critical, generous and parcimonious, [and] very opinionated." Dr. Panza died in 2010 at the age of 87. His home was turned into a public museum run by Fondo per l'Ambiente Italiano, the Italian national trust, in 2000. Upon his death, Dr. Panza donated a large number of Simpson's interference paintings to the Albright-Knox Art Gallery in Buffalo, New York.

=== Critical reception ===
"In the 1970s, Simpson's painting would have taken its place more readily in the narrower context of color-field abstraction, a tendency more associated with New York than the Bay Area. How lucid and soulful Simpson's big paintings of the period look today. They may appear to present themselves wholly at a glance, because they conceal nothing, but it takes time to size up how any one of these pictures operates in terms of color, composition or visual poetics."—Kenneth Baker.

"Spending time with a David Simpson painting, one experiences shifts of light and color like that which happens when looking at the sky or ocean. Those transitions may appear subtle or spectacular, depending on a work's size and the conditions of its installation, but each canvas is active and also activates viewers in the space around it. In the mid 1980s, Simpson began working with interference paints, an acrylic coated in micro-particles of mica, which upon interacting with light, cause effects like the swirling spectrum of colors visible on the surfaces of oil puddles or soap bubbles. Simpson's skill with the medium is masterful."—Louis Grachos.

"If anything, Simpson's paintings became more predictable before they grew less so. By the time he was preparing to leave for Sacramento, he'd cast aside cubism to make straightforwardly expressionist landscapes—thickets of childlike brushstrokes that were skillful exercises in the standard Bay Area style of the period. The transition that followed was both radical and natural. His surroundings completely changed, Simpson enlisted primitivism in a wholly new way. Specifically he took up the stacked structure commonly seen in children's drawings, which he ingeniously applied to the extreme horizontals of the Sacramento skyline? No longer was Simpson's primitivism a mannered affectation. It was fully internalized to his composition."—Jonathon Keats.

=== Survey book ===
In May 2016, Radius Books published a survey book of Simpson's life's work entitled, David Simpson Works 1965-2015. Featuring essays and 120 color illustrations, the book traces Simpson's progression through numerous artistic phases. About the book Simpson has said, "[It] is an exquisite creation. It does a wonderful job of showing how my work varied and developed over the years." The survey book includes exhibition reviews from the Richmond Independent and the San Francisco Chronicle, as well as the transcription of a conversation between Simpson and the art critic Kenneth Baker.

== Selected public and private collections ==
- Albright-Knox Art Gallery, Buffalo, New York
- Baltimore Museum of Art, Baltimore, Maryland
- Colgate University, Hamilton, New York
- Columbia Broadcasting System, New York City, New York
- Crocker Art Museum, Sacramento, California
- David Owsley Museum of Art Ball State University, Muncie, Indiana
- Herbert F. Johnson Museum of Art, Cornell University, Ithaca, New York
- Honolulu Museum of Art, Honolulu, Hawaii
- IBM Corporation, San Jose, California
- John D. and Catherine T. MacArthur Foundation, Chicago, Illinois
- Laguna Art Museum, Laguna Beach, California
- Madison Museum of Contemporary Art, Madison, Wisconsin
- Museum of Modern Art, New York City, New York
- National Collection of Fine Arts, Washington, DC
- Oakland Museum of California, Oakland, California
- Panza Collection, Varese, Italy; Lugano, Switzerland
- Philadelphia Museum of Art, Philadelphia, Pennsylvania
- Phoenix Art Museum, Phoenix, Arizona
- Reed College, Portland, Oregon
- San Francisco Museum of Modern Art, San Francisco, California
- Seattle Art Museum, Seattle, Washington
- Shasta College, Redding, California
- University of California, Berkeley, California
- University of Nebraska–Lincoln, Lincoln, Nebraska
