= Palo Alto Art Center =

Multi-purpose center open to the public in Palo Alto, California

- Formation: 1971; 55 years ago
- Type: governmental organization
- Purpose: arts, visual art education
- Location(s): 1313 Newell Road, Palo Alto, California, U.S.
- Coordinates: 37°26′39″N 122°08′20″W
- Key people: Karen Kienzle (director, 2009)
- Formerly called: Palo Alto Community Cultural Center

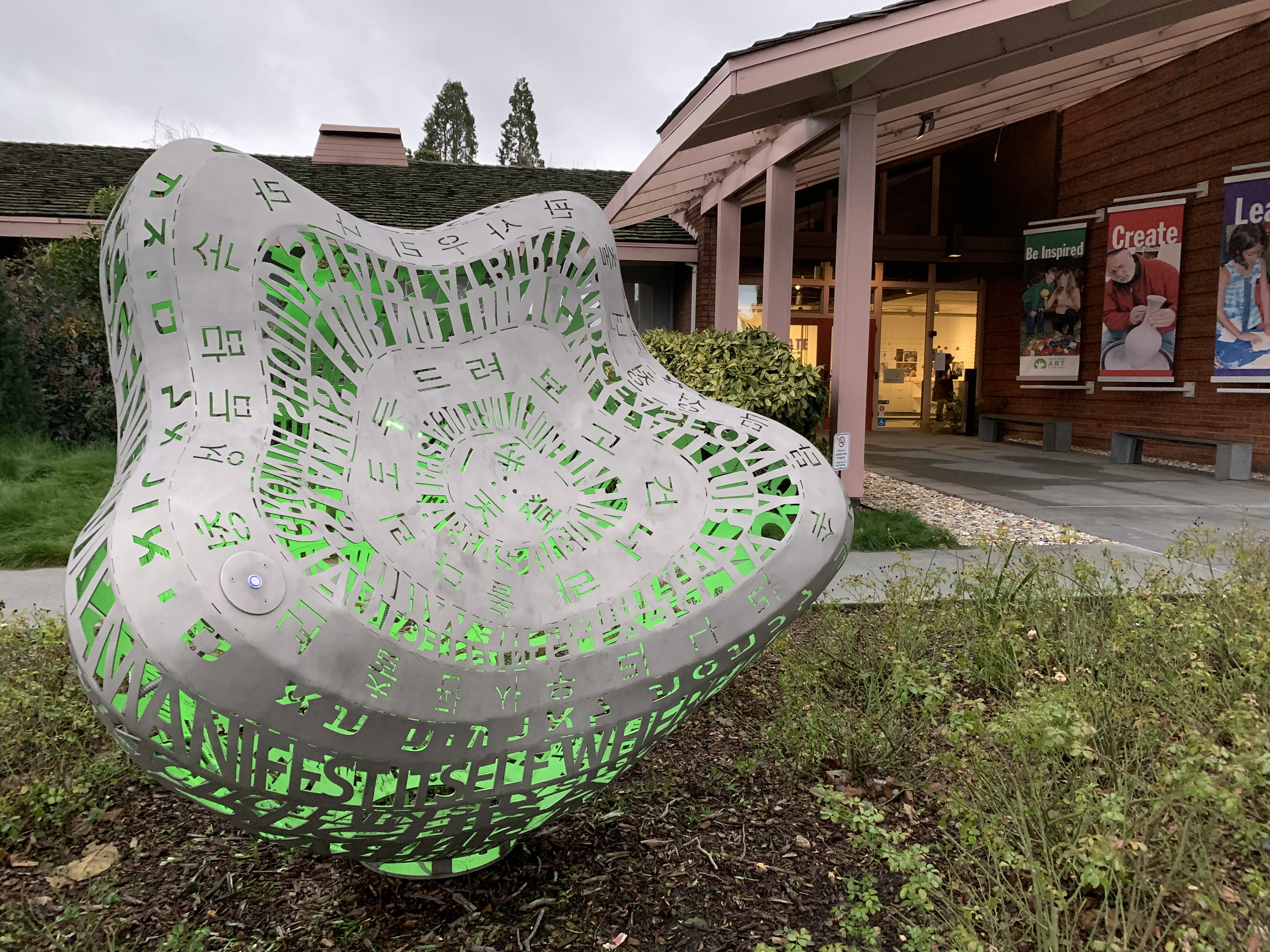
The main entrance of the Palo Alto Art Center

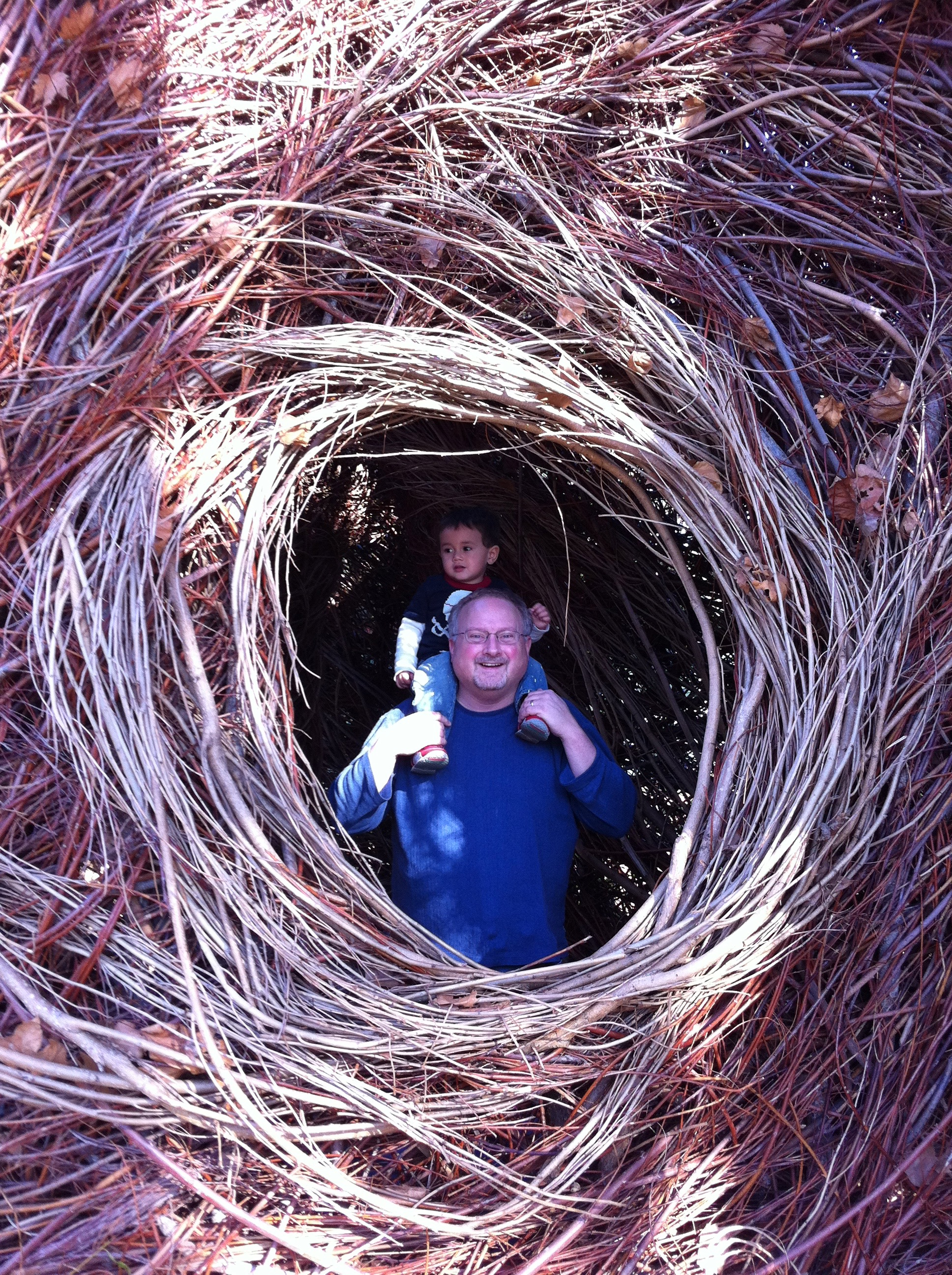
Visitors playing in the sculpture Whiplash (2016).

The Palo Alto Art Center is a multi-purpose center open to the public for art activities for all ages, located at 1313 Newell Road in Palo Alto, California. It is managed by the City of Palo Alto, California and supported by the non-profit Palo Alto Art Center Foundation (PAACF). The center is located adjacent to Rinconada Park and the Rinconada Public Library.

== History ==
The Palo Alto Art Center was originally named the Palo Alto Community Cultural Center when it was founded in 1971. Hayward Ellis King served as a consultant curator in 1972.

The building which occupies Palo Alto Art Center was built in 1953 by architect Leslie Nichols and used to be the location for Palo Alto's City Hall. From 2010 until 2012, the building underwent major renovations which included adding additional classrooms and a new children's wing. In 2016, after the death of local art collector and printshop and press owner, Paula Kirkeby, her printshop and studio equipment was donated to the Palo Alto Art Center.

Karen Kienzle has been the director of Palo Alto Art Center, since 2009.

== About ==
=== Arts education ===
The Art Center has art classes for both adults and children, workshops, summer camps, and drop-in programs that take place in the Center's studios and classrooms. Courses include painting, drawing, mixed-media, ceramics, and jewelry. School outreach programs include offering schools with Project Look field trips and the Cultural Kaleidoscope program that pairs students from the Palo Alto Unified School District and Ravenswood City School District for art activities.

=== Exhibitions and events ===
Visitors can view free exhibitions with artwork in a wide range of media, and participate in free events. Events include Friday Night at the Art Center, Family Days, The Great Glass Pumpkin Patch, and the Clay and Glass Festival.

The City of Palo Alto maintains a list of past exhibitions. Some highlights are:

- 1980 exhibition, Contemporary Trends in Presentation Drawings, curated by Roberta Loach, Linda Langston; including J.J. Aasen, Walter Askin, Gary Brown, Eleanor Dickinson, Bob Anderson, Harry Lynn Krizan, Judith Linhares, Roy DeForest, Robert Freimark, Sylvia Lark, Roberta Loach, Norman Lundin, Shane Weare, Vince Perez, Mary Snowden
- 2017 exhibition, Play! contained a range of pieces exploring the power of play.
- 2018 exhibition, Through That Which Is Seen shared the art of dioramas.
- 2019 exhibition, The Sheltering Sky features 18 artists on sky-related themes, such as the 2-story photo "Sky Front" by Sukey Bryan.

A Patrick Dougherty temporary installation called Whiplash (2016), which was a woven structure of willow branches forming a series of shelters was on display the lawn on Embarcadero Road and was a popular place where many people took photographs. Dougherty's sculpture was created in part by a team of volunteers and a crowdfunding campaign of $15,000. In June 2020, the Dougherty sculpture was removed.

The center has produced solo exhibitions for many artists including: Christopher Brown, Jim Campbell, Joseph Cornell, Stephen De Staebler, Richard Diebienkorn, Marjorie Eaton, Keith Haring, Julie Heffernan, Mildred Howard, Jess, Carlos Loarca, Manuel Neri, Beverly Mayeri, David Park, Picasso, Alan Rath, Judith Selby Lang, Elizabeth Sher, Masami Teraoka, Ruth Terrill, Beth van Hoesen among others.

The artists-in-residence program also provide opportunities for artists to engage with the public.

== Gallery ==
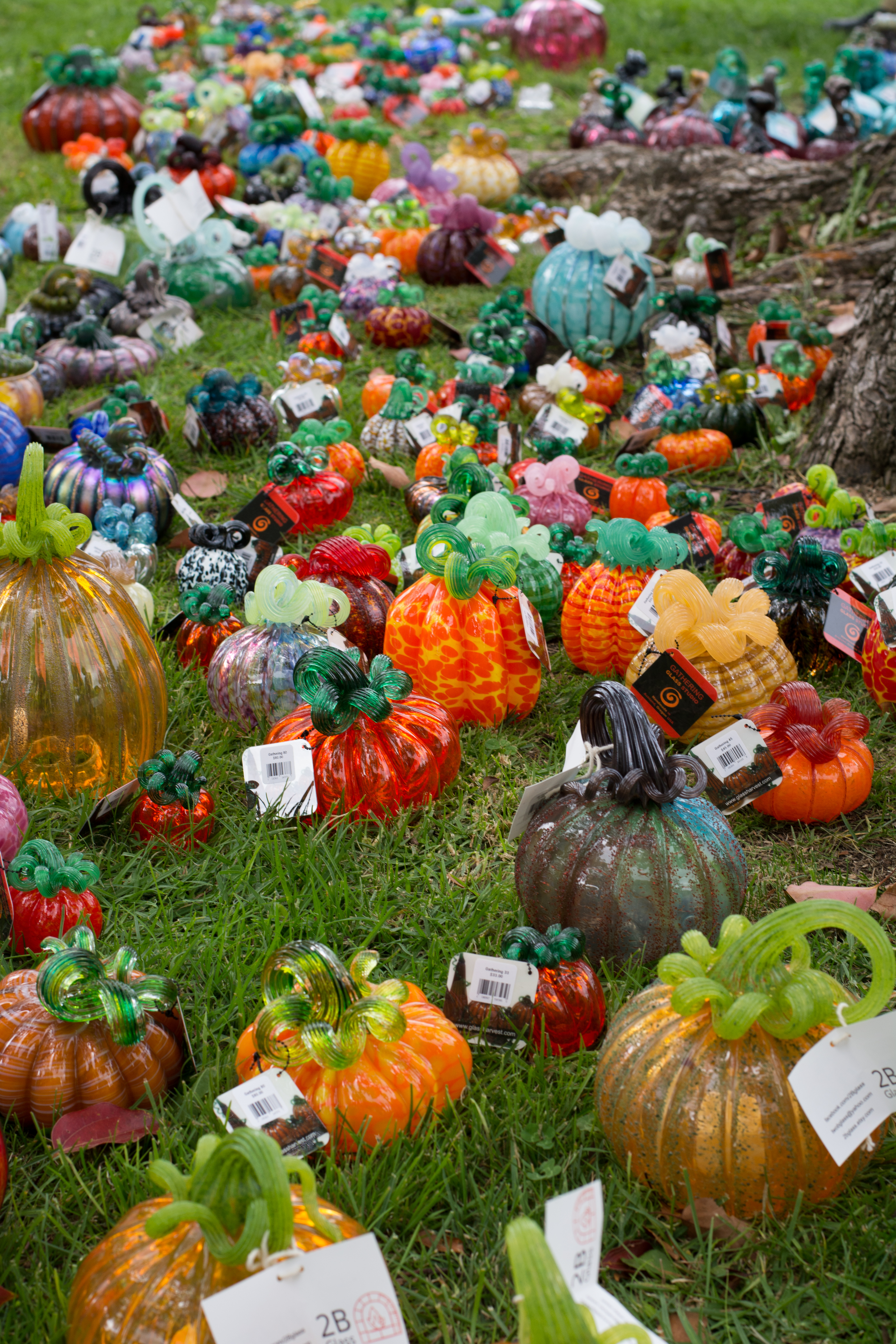
Great Glass Pumpkin Patch 2018

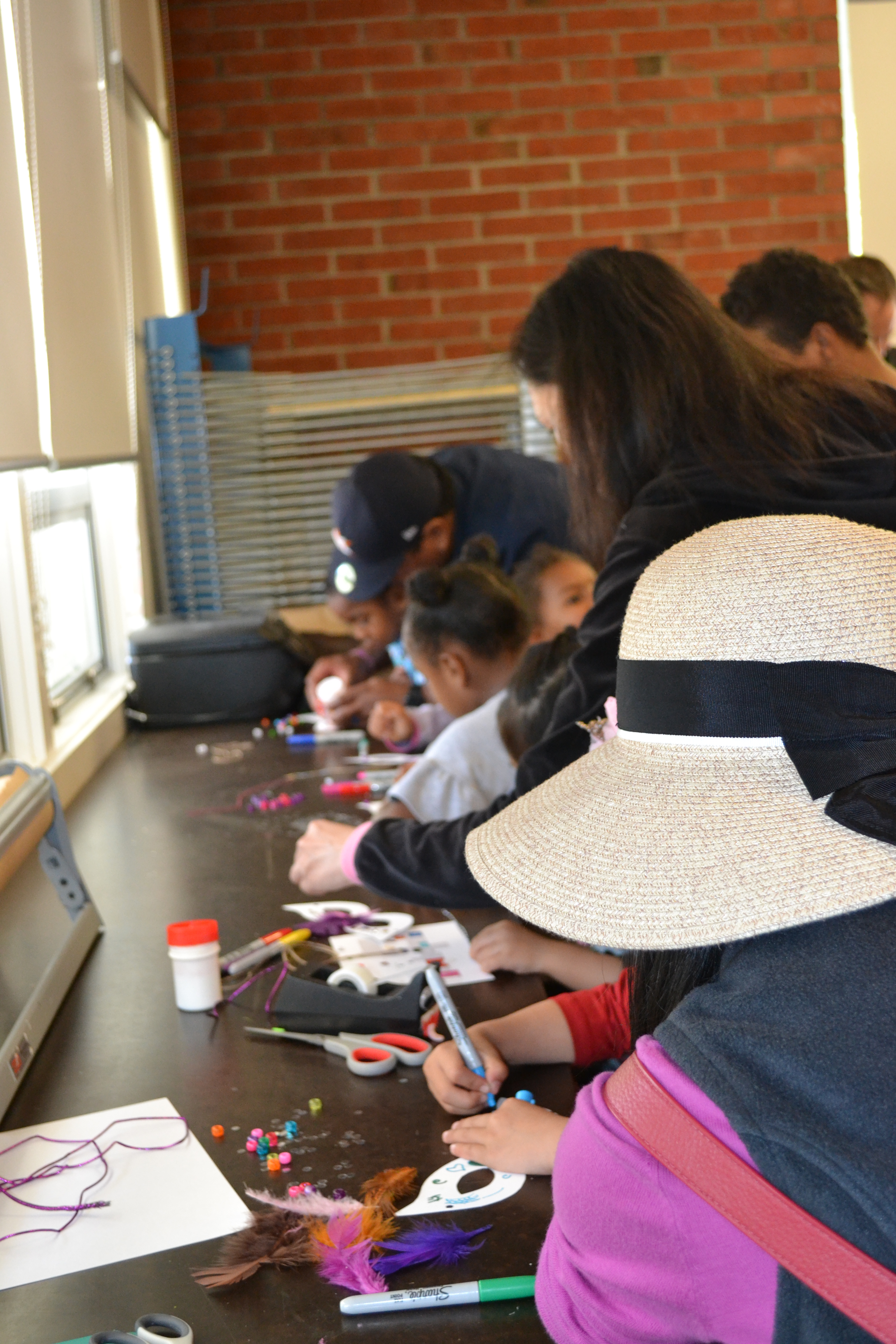
Art Activities at Circus Family Day 2018

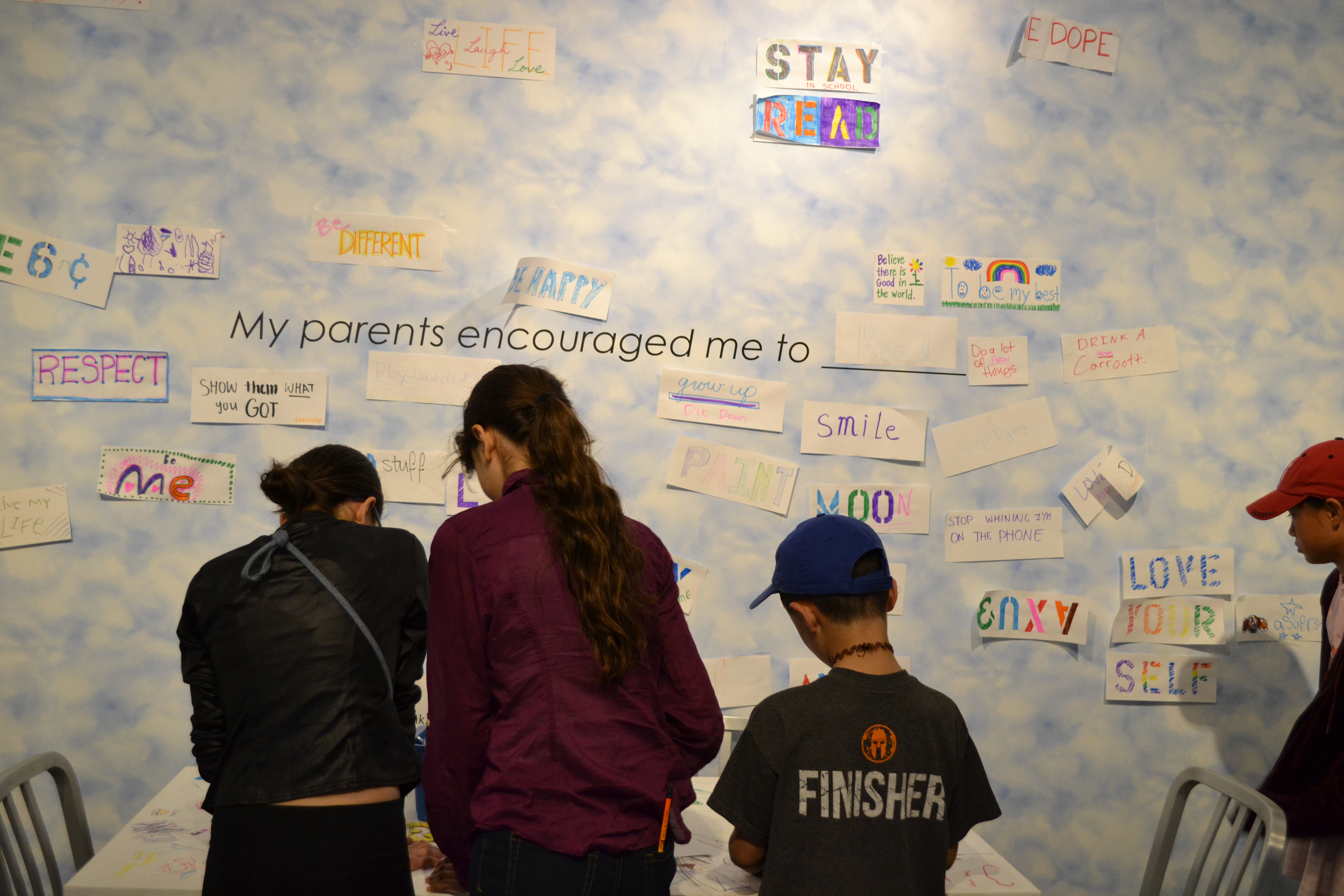
Circus Family Day 2018 - Nook Activity

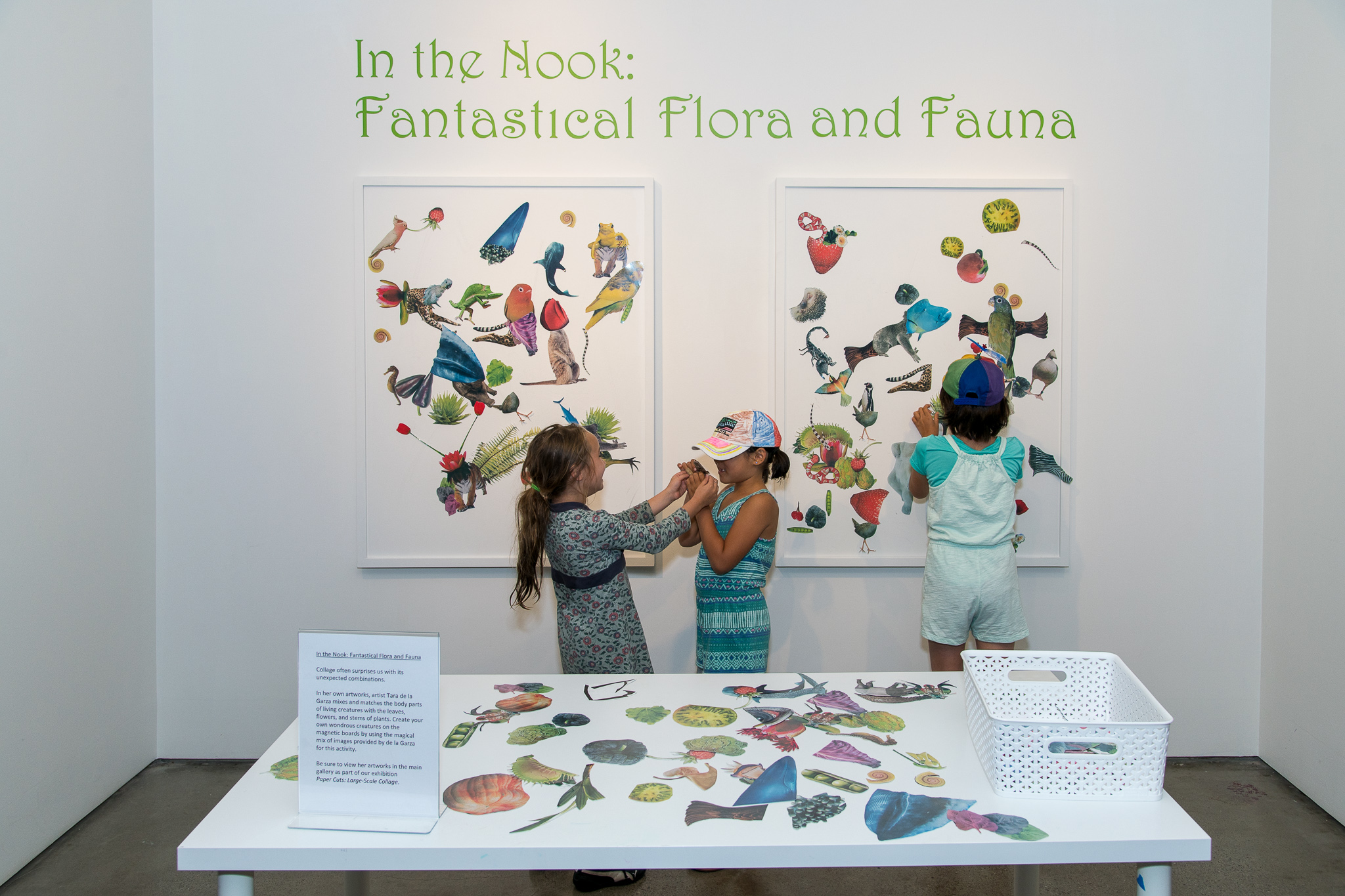
Friday Night at the Art Center - Nook Activity

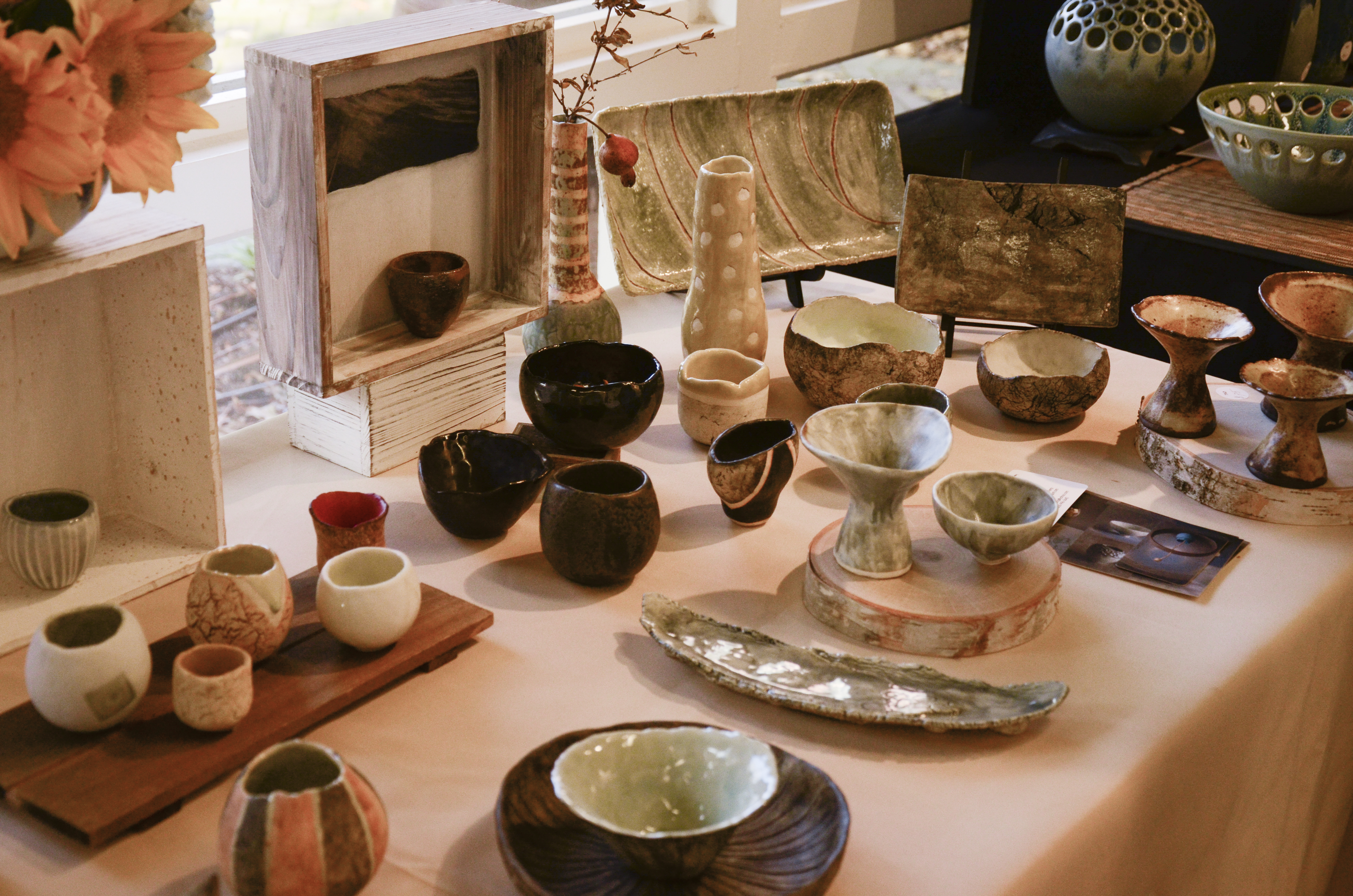
Ceramics and jewelry studio creations (2018 Holiday Sale)
