= Hayward Ellis King =

American visual artist (1928–1990)

- Born: March 28, 1928; Little Rock, Arkansas, U.S.
- Died: August 2, 1990 (aged 62); San Francisco, California, U.S.
- Burial place: San Francisco National Cemetery
- Education: Pasadena City College
- Alma mater: California School of Fine Arts
- Occupations: Painter, collagist, art dealer, arts administrator

Hayward Ellis King (1928–1990) was an American painter, collagist, art dealer, and an arts administrator. He was a mid-20th century arts leader in San Francisco, California, a co-founder of Six Gallery, and served as the director of the Richmond Art Center. He was the first Black artist to serve as both director and curator of a major San Francisco Bay Area art gallery.

== Early life and education ==
Hayward Ellis King was born on March 28, 1928, in Little Rock, Arkansas. He grew up in Pasadena, California. King, and his friends Walter Askin, Wally Hedrick, David Simpson, and Paula Webb Clark-Samazan attended Pasadena City College (PCC) before they all moved to the San Francisco Bay Area.

King moved to San Francisco in early summer of 1949 and studied at California School of Fine Arts (CSFA, later known as San Francisco Art Institute) in San Francisco. In 1950 he was drafted into the United States Army during the Korean War. After serving in the military, King returned to the San Francisco Bay Area. He graduated in with a BFA degree in painting in 1955 from CSFA. He had studied under Jean Varda, David Park, Richard Diebenkorn, and Elmer Bischoff. In 1955, he won a Fulbright scholarship, and studied at the Sorbonne University in Paris.

== Career ==
King worked primarily with collage, incorporating xerography, drawing, and magazine clippings. He also made brightly colored abstract oil paintings.

In 1955, he was a co-founder of Six Gallery, along with his classmates from CSFA, Deborah Remington, Wally Hedrick, David Simpson, John Allen Ryan, and Jack Spicer. The group also took over the King Ubu Gallery in the Fillmore District.

King was a curator for John Bolles Gallery and Stuart Street Gallery in San Francisco; and worked as a curator consultant for the Palo Alto Cultural Center (now the Palo Alto Art Center) starting in 1972, and for the San Mateo County Arts Council Gallery starting in 1975. He taught classes at San Francisco State University (SFSU).

== Death and legacy ==
King died of cancer on August 2, 1990. He is buried at the San Francisco National Cemetery.

King was part of the group exhibition Hopes Springing High: Gifts Of Art By African American Artists (2018) at the Crocker Art Museum; other artists in the exhibit included Romare Bearden, Beauford Delaney, Evangeline Montgomery, Betye Saar, Sam Gilliam, Elizabeth Catlett, Norman Lewis, Richard Mayhew, Faith Ringgold, Alison Saar, Alma Woodsey Thomas, Allen Stringfellow, and Mickalene Thomas.
