= The War Room (disambiguation) =

The War Room is a 1993 American documentary film about the 1992 U.S. presidential campaign of Bill Clinton.

The War Room or War Room may also refer to:

- The War Room with Michael Shure, a news and political commentary program on Current TV
- The War Room with Owen Shroyer, an internet/talk radio program on InfoWars
- The War Room with Quinn and Rose, a syndicated talk radio program
- The War Room (EP), a 2012 EP by Public Service Broadcasting
- "The War Room" (Roseanne), a 1997 television episode
- The War Room, a novel by Bryan Malessa

War Room may also refer to:

- Command center, sometimes referred to as a war room
- War Room (video game), a ColecoVision video game
- War Room (Wally Hedrick), an artwork by Wally Hedrick
- War Room (film), a 2015 American film directed by Alex Kendrick
- War Room, an Andrew Tate "global network"
- War Room (podcast), a podcast by Steve Bannon
