= Shirley Neilsen Blum =

American art historian

- Born: Shirley Marie Neilsen; October 14, 1932 (age 93); Petaluma, California, US
- Occupation: Purchase College
- Spouses: Walter Hopps (m. 1955; div. 1966) Irving Blum (m. 1967; div. 1976)
- Children: Jason Blum

Academic background
- Education: University of Chicago, University of California, Los Angeles

Shirley Hopps Neilsen Blum, also known as Shirley Hopps (born 14 October 1932) is an American art historian, author, gallerist, and professor emeritus at Purchase College (1970–1989). She specializes in Northern Renaissance art, early Netherlandish art, and modern art. In the 1950s through the 1960s, she was active in the Los Angeles gallery scene, and she co-founded and co-ran Ferus Gallery.

== Biography ==
Blum was born Shirley Marie Neilsen in 1932 in Petaluma, California, to parents Dana (née Keyes) and Melvin Louis Neilsen. She received a M.A. degree in 1955 from University of Chicago and a Ph.D. in Netherlandish art in 1964 from University of California, Los Angeles (UCLA). Her thesis advisor was Karl Martin Birkmeyer.

She was married in 1955 to Walter Hopps of the Ferus Gallery and future curator at Pasadena Art Museum, but the marriage ended in divorce in 1966. In 1967, she married a co-worker at the Ferus Gallery and art dealer, Irving Blum, which ended in 1976. Shirley and Irving Blum had a son born in 1969, film producer Jason Blum.

Shirley and Walter ran Ferus gallery together for many years. Walter Hopps and Shirley bought out Andy Warhol's first exhibition at Ferus Gallery in 1962, a collection which ended up being worth $15 million by 1996.

She taught art history at her alma mater University of Chicago, from 1961 until 1962. Between 1962 and 1973, Blum was an assistant professor at University of California, Riverside. From 1970 until 1989, Blum served as a professor at State University of New York at Purchase (SUNY Purchase). At SUNY Purchase, she founded the Art History Department. Neilsen was the Charles A. Dana Department Chair at Colgate University, from 1973 until 1974.

== Selected publications ==
- Blum, Shirley Neilsen; Coplans, John (1966). Jawlensky and the Serial Image. University of California, Irvine Art Gallery and Pasadena Art Museum. Regents University of California.
- Blum, Shirley Neilsen (1969). Early Netherlandish Triptychs: A Study in Patronage. California Studies in the History of Art. Vol. 13 of Quantum Books. University of California Press. ISSN 0068-5909.
- Blum, Shirley Neilsen (2010). Henri Matisse: Rooms with a View. Thames & Hudson. ISBN 9780500238783.
- Blum, Shirley Neilsen (2015). The New Art of the Fifteenth Century. Faith and Art in Florence and the Netherlands. Abbeville Press. ISBN 978-0-7892-1192-7.

== See also ==
- Women in the art history field
