= Amanda Means =

American artist and photographer (born 1945)

Amanda Means (born 1945) is an American artist and photographer.

== Early life and education ==
Means was born in 1945 in Marion, New York. She grew up on a farm in Upstate New York. The region consisted largely of family-owned small farms that produced the state's apples, dairy, and vegetables. "Our cobblestone farmhouse, built in the early 1800s, was constructed with small palm-sized stones naturally rounded by water from the shores of Lake Ontario," she has said, adding that she slept in a treehouse in the summer, and spent much time alone in the woods and fields. This time alone in nature as a child would create within her a deep and lifelong connection to nature, influencing her early black and white landscapes and eventually her camera-less images of plants and leaves. Means left the family farm to study art in New York City, where she was influenced by painters of the Abstract Expressionist Movement such as Jackson Pollock, Willem de Kooning, and Mark Rothko. Her transition from rural to urban environment was intensified by her family's loss of their farm and the eventual death of her father. She received a Bachelor of Arts from Cornell University in 1969 and a Master of Fine Arts in photography from University at Buffalo (Visual Studies Workshop) in 1978. In 1976 she attended the Aperion Workshops and studied under Ralph Gibson.

== Career ==
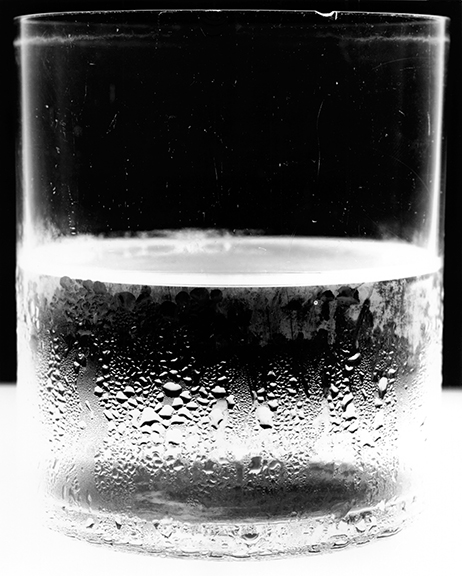
Water Glass 2, 2004 (Variant) by Means

Known for her camera-less images, Means often uses a technique similar to the darkroom process which creates photograms, but is uniquely her own. She uses objects such as leaves, light bulbs, and water glasses, instead of photographic negatives, to produce her prints. For both her Leaves and Flowers series (both ongoing, begun in the 1990s) she places the botanical subject on a piece of glass in the head of the photographic enlarger. The enlarger light passes through the organic matter and onto the paper in a way that makes them seem to glow. Traditional photographic techniques rely on reflected light in both camera and darkroom, but her technique avoids light reflection altogether. The effect is that the prints seem to emanate their own light, aligning them with the light-emitting pigments of oil painting. She used similar techniques for her subsequent Water Glass and Light Bulb series. Scott Hall describes the effect of these techniques: "Her transformation of ordinary household objects into sublime Minimal art is not only evident in the bulb series, but also in the black and white prints of water glasses... Sweaty, chipped and scratched vessels monumentally fill the frame, revealing the beauty in the mundane."

== Career ==
Means has made black and white prints for clients Robert Mapplethorpe, Roni Horn, and the Smithsonian Institution. She was awarded a 2017 Guggenheim Fellowship in photography.

She has taught at various universities and art schools including State University of New York at Plattsburgh (1989); Emily Carr College of Art, Vancouver, BC, Canada (1992); University of Ottawa, Ottawa, Canada (1992); St. Lawrence University, Canton, NY (1999); International Center of Photography, NY (2000); Parsons The New School for Design, NY (2001); University of Memphis, Memphis, TN (2001); Pratt Institute, Brooklyn, NY (2002).

Means has been Trustee of the John Coplans Trust in Beacon, New York since 2003.

She has been a contributing editor for Bomb magazine since 1984. Her early nature landscapes, and early black and white photographs of leaves, were published in the magazine's portfolios.

== Publications with contributions by Means ==
- Flora. New York: Graphis, 2002. ISBN 1-931241-09-0.
- Photography's Antiquarian Avant-Garde: The New Wave in Old Processes by Lyle Rexer. New York: Harry N. Abrams, 2002. ISBN 0-8109-0402-0.
- The Unseen Eye: Photographs From The Unconscious by W.M. Hunt. New York: Aperture, 2011. ISBN 978-1-59711-193-5.
- The Poetic Species by Edward O. Wilson and Robert Hass. New York: Bellevue Literary Press, 2014. ISBN 978-1-934137-72-7.

== Solo exhibitions ==
- Zilkha Gallery, Center for the Arts, Wesleyan University, Middlebury, CT, 1983.
- Gremillion Co., Houston, Texas, 1998.
- Metta Galeria, Madrid, Spain, 1999.
- HastedHunt Gallery, New York City, 1998 and 2001.
- Nina Freudenheim Gallery, Buffalo, NY, 2003.
- Howard Yezerski Gallery, Boston, 2000 and 2003.
- Gallery 339, Philadelphia, 2008 and 2006.
- Harvard Museum of Natural History, Cambridge, MA, 2008.
- St. Olaf College, 2008.
- Ricco Maresca Gallery, 2001.
- Ricco/Maresca Gallery, 2008.
- Bergdorf Goodman, 2008.
- Nina Freudenheim Gallery, 2009.
- Howard Yezerski Gallery, 2009 and 2011.
- Grounds for Sculpture, Trenton, NJ, 2009.
- Bergdorf Goodman, New York City, 2009.
- Second Street Gallery, Charlottesville, VA, 2011.
- Joseph Bellows Gallery, La Jolla, CA, 2013.

== Collections ==
Means' work is held in the following collections:

- Los Angeles County Museum of Art.
- San Francisco Museum of Modern Art (SFMOMA).
- Museum of Fine Arts, Boston.
- Museum of Fine Arts, Houston.
- Whitney Museum of American Art.
- Albright-Knox Art Gallery, Buffalo, NY.
- Avon Collection of Women Photographers, NY.
- Robinson and Nancy Grover Collection, Hartford, CT.
- W.M.Hunt - Collection Dancing Bear, NY.
- National Gallery of Canada, Ottawa, Canada.
- National Media Museum, Bradford, England.
- Wadsworth Atheneum Museum of Art, Hartford, CT.
- St. Lawrence University, Canton, NY.
- Whitehead Collection of Art, Boston, MA.
