= War Room (Wally Hedrick) =

Installing Hedrick's War Room at Sonoma State University in 2002.

The War Room (1967/68–2002), by Wally Hedrick (1928–2003), consists of eight canvases approximately 5 feet wide and 11 feet tall, all painted a deep black. Hedrick referred to these canvases as "wounded veterans". These canvases are bolted together to create a freestanding cubic room that could be entered via a small door in one of the canvases, thus creating an architectural painting. The black painted surfaces of the canvases face inward and the backs of the canvases face outward.

The War Room is an “environmental” painting; the viewer enters a small enclosure of painted blackness. The viewer is left to consider the encompassing darkness and contemplate the vacuity that this space creates. Hedrick refused to ignore the war and instead created a work of cultural and political significance. After the Vietnam War ended he repainted these canvases black in protest of the Gulf War in 1992 and the Iraq war in 2002.

During this time, Hedrick was accused of stealing paintings, including a canvas by Clyfford Still, from the San Francisco Art Institute, where he was teaching, then either painting them black or painting his own iconoclastic pictures over them.

The War Room is a significant item of Bay Area art history.
