= John Coplans =

British artist, art writer, curator, and museum director

'Back with Arms Above', black and white photograph by John Coplans, 1984

John Rivers Coplans (24 June 1920 – 21 August 2003) was a British artist, art writer, curator, and museum director. A veteran of World War II and a photographer, he emigrated to the United States in 1960 and had many exhibitions in Europe and North America. He was on the founding editorial staff of Artforum from 1962 to 1971, and was Editor-in-Chief from 1972 to 1977.

== Early life and service in the Second World War ==
John Coplans was born in London in 1920. His father was Joseph Moses Coplans, a medical doctor and a man of many scientific and artistic talents. His father left England for Johannesburg while John was an infant. At the age of two, John was brought to his father in South Africa; from 1924 to 1927 the family was in flux between London and South Africa, settling in a seaside Cape Town suburb until 1930. Despite the instability of his early home life, Coplans developed an enormous admiration for his father, who took him to galleries at weekends and instilled within him a love for exploration, experimentation, and a fascination with the world.

In 1937, John Coplans returned to England from South Africa. When eighteen, he was commissioned into the Royal Air Force as an Acting Pilot Officer. Due to his hearing being affected by a rugby match, two years later, he volunteered for the army. His childhood experience living in Africa led to his appointment to the King's African Rifles in East Africa. He was active as a platoon commander (primarily in Ethiopia) until 1943, after which his unit was deployed to Burma. In 1945 Coplans returned to civilian life and decided to become an artist.

== Early career ==
After being demobilised, Coplans settled in London, rooming at the Abbey Art Centre; he wanted to become an artist. The British government was giving grants to veterans of the war, and he received one such grant to study art. He tried both Goldsmiths and Chelsea College of the Arts, but found that art school did not suit him. He painted part-time for clients including Cecil Beaton, Basil Deardon whilst running his business John Rivers Limited which specialised in interior decorating.

In the mid-1950s, Coplans began attending lectures by Lawrence Alloway at the Institute of Contemporary Arts. Here he was introduced to the budding Pop Art movement, which he would become deeply involved in as both critic and curator. His experience viewing exhibitions such as the Hard-Edged Painting exhibition (ICA, 1959) and New American Painting (The Tate, 1959) helped to solidify his growing passion for not just Pop Art, but American art as well.

During this period he struggled as a young artist to find his artistic voice, and developed an abstract painting practice which reflected trends of tachism and Abstract Expressionism pioneered by Americans Jackson Pollock and Willem de Kooning. Coplans would later refer to this early painting work as "derivative"; these paintings were shown in exhibitions at the Royal Society of British Artists (1950) and later at the New Vision Center.

In 1960, Coplans sold all of his belongings and moved to the United States, initially settling in San Francisco and taking a position at UC Berkeley as a visiting assistant design professor. Here he met gallerist Phil Leider, the future editor of Artforum. Leider connected Coplans to John Irwin, who wanted to start a magazine. Coplans convinced Irwin that the West Coast needed an art publication: one that gave voice to art that was important, but had not yet received critical attention. He further suggested that it should be published in square format so that both vertical and horizontal images would be viewed equally, thus giving birth to Artforum's iconic shape—and to the successful foundation of Artforum itself. Coplans was a regular writer for the magazine. His perspective on art writing was anti-elitist, using popular appeal and excitement over new work to “stimulate debate and awareness” especially for West Coast artists.

Finding himself conflicted between his painting and writing careers, he chose the latter and devoted the next twenty years of his life to the magazine, as well as curatorial pursuits and a career as a museum director. It was not until 1981, at the age of 62, that he returned to his career as an artist.

== Artistic practice ==
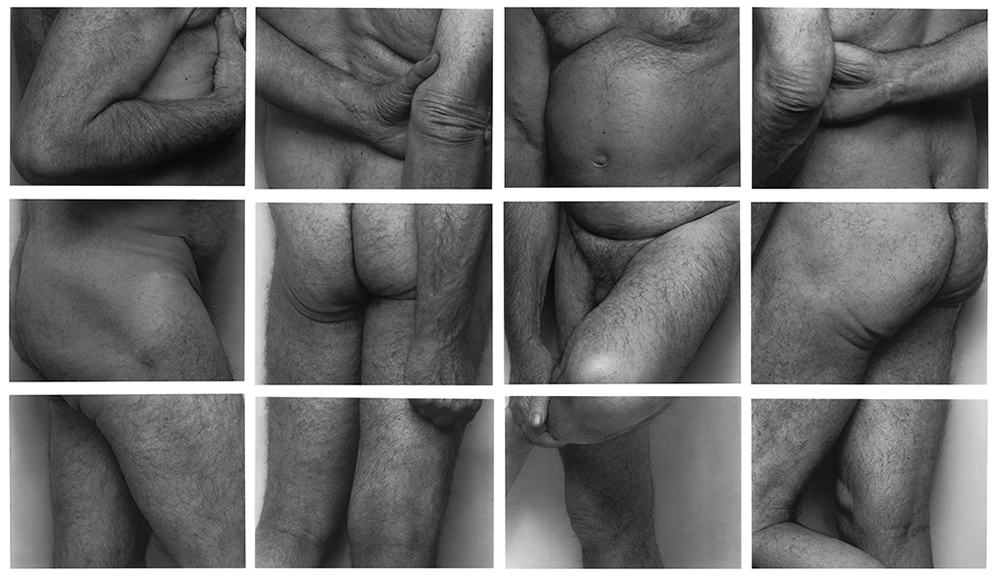
"Frieze, No. 2, Four Panels, 1994" by John Coplans, in the collection of The Whitney Museum of American Art and the Tate Modern.

Coplans is known for his series of black and white self-portraits which are a frank study of the naked, aging body. He photographed his body from the base of his foot to the wrinkles on his hand. As he never photographed his face, his images are not focused on a specific man nor identity.

In 1980, during his one-year appointment as head of the Akron Art Museum in Ohio, Coplans first began experimenting with photography. Here he took his initial nude photographs with a timer, but would not return to the idea until 1984, when he began a serious exploration into the self portraits with the help of an assistant. The poses were inspired by an intuitive connection to a pre-conscious, pre-lingual awareness of the body. “I don’t know how it happens, but when I pose for one of these photographs, I become immersed in the past...I am somewhere else, another person, or a woman in another life. At times, I’m in my youth.”

His technique for making the photographs involved use of Polaroid positive/negative 4x5 film, so that he could quickly see the result of the poses and make immediate adjustments. He later used a video camera connected to a television monitor to see the back of the 4x5 camera for an even more immediate mirror effect. Although this technique deepened his control and accuracy, it is of note that he claimed to possess a sense of pre-determined clarity about the poses.

His photographs ultimately question the taboo of age through the provocative and direct style of addressing his body. Said Coplans: “I have the feeling that I’m alive, I have a body. I’m seventy years old, and generally the bodies of seventy-year old men look somewhat like my body. It's a neglected subject matter...So, I’m using my body and saying, even though it's a seventy year old body, I can make it interesting. This keeps me alive and gives me vitality. It's a kind of process of energizing myself by my belief that the classical tradition of art that we’ve inherited from the Greeks is a load of bullshit.”

== Exhibitions ==
His major one-person exhibitions include: the Art Institute of Chicago (1981, 1989), the San Francisco Museum of Modern Art (1988), the Museum of Modern Art, NY (1988), Boymans-van Beuningan, Rotterdam (1990), the Fundacio Calouste Gulbenkian, Lisbon (1990), the Centre George Pompidou, Paris (1994), Ludwig Forum, Aachen (1995), P.S.1 Contemporary Art Center, NY (1997), Paco dasArtes, São Paulo (1998), Scottish National Gallery of Modern Art, Edinburgh (1999), Malmö Konsthall, Sweden (1999).

== Artforum ==
Coplans had a long affiliation with Artforum as one of its founding members (1962), a contributing critic, and chief editor (1971-1976). Along with fellow founding member John Irwin he followed the magazine to Los Angeles and, in 1967, to its permanent home in New York. In June 1971, he replaced Philip Leider as chief editor (first announced on the magazine's masthead in January 1972). He subsequently presided over the magazine's tumultuous years, which saw the core editorial group of the mid- to late 1960s break apart into a handful of factions; the majority of the group had left the magazine by the end of the 1970s. Coplans's reign at Artforum was considered a time of editorial catholicity, reflecting a moment of expanding media, practices, and modes of engagement within contemporary art. He was dismissed, along with his managing editor Max Kozloff, by the magazine's publisher Charles Cowles in December 1976.

== Curator and museum director ==
From 1965 to 1967 Coplans was director of the Art Gallery of the University of California at Irvine. As senior curator at the Pasadena Art Museum (1967–1970), Coplans was among the earliest champions of Pop Art and a vociferously sympathetic critic of the work of Roy Lichtenstein and especially Andy Warhol. Coplans began a series of exhibitions in a small gallery in the old Pasadena Art Museum which included West Coast artists Dewain Valentine, Doug Wheeler, James Turrell, Robert Irwin, Wayne Thiebaud, and Judy Chicago. In many of these cases, such as with Lichtenstein, it was their crucial first exhibition. Many of the catalogue essays that accompanied these exhibitions were also published in Artforum, bringing critical attention for these West Coast artists to a New York audience.

In 1968, Coplans became acting director of the Pasadena Art Museum and curated the "Serial Imagery" show. He resigned in 1970 and left California in 1971 to become the editor in chief of Artforum in New York City. He did, however, curate another major Warhol exhibition as well as a Richard Serra show before his move to New York.

He was director of the Akron Art Museum, Ohio, beginning in February 1978, and ending in December 1979, when he left his position due to a dispute with the museum's board of directors. During his leadership he brought many exhibitions to Akron from New York and helped the institution to focus on photography and art of the nineteenth century and thereafter. He led the museum's efforts to raise $5 million and design a new art museum facility utilising the 1899 Post Office Building in downtown Akron. This brief period was also important as Coplans bought cameras, set up a dark room in his apartment, and actively began his photographic work, initially by mimicking photographers who he admired, such as Lee Friedlander, Jan Groover, and others. He moved back to New York City in February 1980.

== Publications ==
- Blum, Shirley Neilsen; Coplans, John (1966). Jawlensky and the Serial Image. University of California, Irvine Art Gallery and Pasadena Art Museum. Regents University of California.

=== Writings by Coplans ===
Coplans wrote critical essays on the work of such artists as Andy Warhol, Robert Smithson, Philip Guston, and Donald Judd, many of which are included in his anthology entitled Provocations (1996). Many of these texts were initially writings for exhibition catalogues of exhibitions he had curated, and were in turn published in Artforum. Several of these essays, including an early writing on the work of artist Ed Ruscha from a 1965 Artforum article, have been translated to French: Ed Ruscha: Huit textes Vingt-trois entretiens (2011). Following his 1969 Guggenheim Fellowship, he published a monograph on the work of Ellsworth Kelly (1973).

=== Writings about Coplans and artist monographs ===
His artist monographs include A Body (2002) and A Self-Portrait: John Coplans 1984-1997 which was published in tandem with his solo exhibition by the same title at MoMA P.S.1 Contemporary Art Center in New York, 1997.

The photographic work of John Coplans has been a focus of academic study and art criticism since he began his self-portraits in the 1980s. His challenge of the ageist norm and beauty standards in Western culture, as articulated through his photography, has been studied in books such as Christophe Blazer's The Century of the Body, James Hall's The Self Portrait: A Cultural History, Jules Sturm's Bodies We Fail: Productive Embodiments of Imperfection, Davis Melody's The Male Nude in Contemporary Photography, and many others.

== Museum collections ==
The photographs of John Coplans are featured in over sixty museum collections all over the world. These collections include:

- Albright-Knox Art Gallery, Buffalo, New York
- Allen Memorial Art Museum, Oberlin College, Ohio
- Akron Art Museum, Ohio
- Art Institute of Chicago, Chicago
- Bowdoin College Art Museum, Brunswick, Maine
- Brooklyn Museum of Art, New York
- Center for Creative Photography, Tucson, Arizona
- Cleveland Museum of Art, Cleveland, Ohio
- Davidson Art Center, Wesleyan University, Middletown, Connecticut
- Fogg Art Museum, Harvard University, Cambridge, Massachusetts
- High Museum of Art, Atlanta, Georgia
- Honolulu Museum of Art, Hawaii
- International Museum of Photography, George Eastman House, Rochester, New York
- Kresge Art Museum, Michigan State University, East Lansing, Michigan
- Los Angeles County Museum of Art, Los Angeles
- Madison Art Center, Wisconsin
- Metropolitan Museum of Art, New York
- Milwaukee Art Museum, Wisconsin
- Minneapolis Institute of Art, Minnesota
- Museum of Contemporary Art, Chicago
- Museum of Contemporary Photography, Chicago
- Museum of Fine Arts, Boston
- Museum of Fine Arts, Houston
- Neuberger Museum, Purchase, New York
- Newport Harbor Museum, Newport Beach, California
- Princeton University Art Museum, New Jersey
- Rose Art Museum, Brandeis University, Waltham, Massachusetts
- San Francisco Museum of Modern Art, San Francisco
- Spencer Museum of Art, University of Kansas, Lawrence
- Whitney Museum of American Art, New York
- University Art Museum, University of California, Santa Barabara
- Yale University Art Gallery, New Haven, Connecticut
- Musée d'art contemporain de Montréal, Québec
- National Gallery of Canada, Ottawa
- Winnipeg Art Gallery, Manitoba, Canada
- Arts Council of Great Britain, London
- Tate Gallery, London
- Victoria and Albert Museum, London
- Scottish National Galleries, Edinburgh
- Museum of Contemporary Art, Helsinki
- Artothèque de Nantes, France
- Artothèque de Vitre, France
- Centre Georges Pompidou, Paris
- Fonds National d'Art Contemporain, Paris
- Fonds Régional d'Art Contemporain, Basse-Normandie
- Fonds Régional d'Art Contemporain, Champagne Ardenne
- Fonds Régional d'Art Contemporain, Marseille
- La Maison Européenne de la Photographie, Paris
- Musée d'Art Moderne, Saint-Etienne, France
- Musée des Beaux-Arts de Metz, France
- Musée des Beaux-Arts de Strasbourg, France
- Musée du Nouveau Monda, La Rochelle, France
- Musée de la Vielle Charité, Marseille
- Ludwig Forum, Aachen, Germany
- Museum Folkwang, Essen, Germany
- Staatsgalerie Stuttgart, Germany
- Israel Museum, Jerusalem
- Tokyo Metropolitan Museum of Photography, Japan
- Museum Boijmans Van Beuningen, Rotterdam
- Museum Overholland, Amsterdam
- Lillehammer Art Museum, Norway
- I.V.A.M. Valencia, Spain
- Magasin 3 Stockholm Konsthall, Sweden
- Swedish State Collection, Stockholm

== Awards and honors ==
- Guggenheim Fellowship
- National Endowment for the Arts Fellowship (1981)
- Distinguished Visiting Professor, American University of Cairo (1983)
- Guggenheim Fellowship (1985)
- National Endowment for the Arts Fellowship (1986)
- Richard Koopman Distinguished Chair, University of Hartford (1991)
- Officer de L’Ordre des Arts et des Lettres (2001)

== Personal life ==
John Coplans had a daughter, Dr. Barbara Ann Rivers Coplans, born in East Africa with his first wife Betty Coplans (née Little) and a son, Joseph John Coplans born in California, USA with his third wife, Carolyn Coplans (née Teeter). His fourth wife was New York photographer Amanda Means, who is Trustee of the John Coplans Trust in Beacon, New York.
