= Paul Sarkisian =

American contemporary painter (1928–2019)

- Born: 1928; Chicago, Illinois, U.S.
- Died: July 29, 2019 (aged 90–91); Santa Fe, NM
- Education: Art Institute of Chicago
- Known for: Contemporary Art
- Spouse: Carol Sarkisian

Paul Sarkisian (1928 – July 29, 2019) was an American contemporary painter. He achieved a place of prominence during the early years of contemporary art in Los Angeles, then later gained international notoriety as a leading photorealist painter.

== Career ==
Sarkisian's work has been exhibited in many museums including the Whitney Museum, The Museum of Contemporary Art in Los Angeles, The Museum of Contemporary Art Chicago, Hirshhorn Museum and Sculpture Garden, The Carnegie Museums of Pittsburgh, The San Francisco Museum of Modern Art, The Smithsonian Institution, The Chicago Arts Club, Documenta in Kassel, Germany.

Sarkisian's work was shown in exhibition spaces by curator Walter Hopps when they were living in Los Angeles. Exhibitions included The Syndell Studio in 1954, Action Painting 1 (Merry-Go-Round-Show) in 1955, Action Painting 2 (Action Squared) in 1956, The Ferus Gallery in 1957 and The Pasadena Art Museum in 1961, 63 and 68.

Sarkisian's work has been through many stylistic changes. He painted Abstract Expressionist canvases in the 1950s, surrealistic nudes in the 1960s, and trompe l'oeil and minimalist paintings in the 1980s and 90's. In the 1990s Sarkisian produced large-scale structural paintings incorporating shaped panels. He colored the panels with industrial grade resin and enamel.
