= Six Gallery reading =

1955 poetry event at which "Howl" was first read

Coordinates: 37.79828°N 122.43593°W

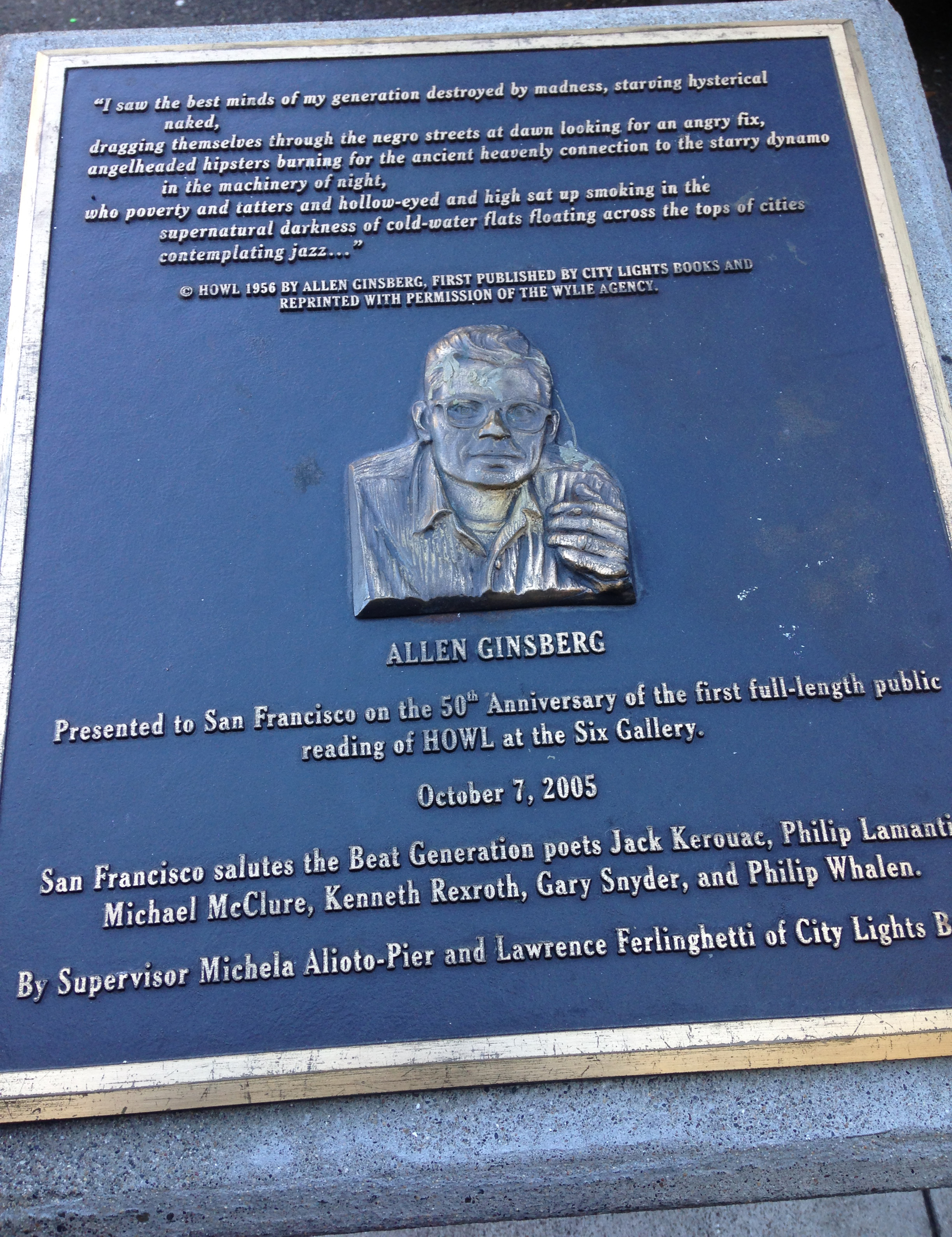
Placed near the location of the Six Gallery on the 50th anniversary of the first public reading of "Howl"

The Six Gallery reading (also called the Gallery Six reading or Six Angels in the Same Performance) was an important poetry event that took place on Friday, October 7, 1955, at an art gallery on Fillmore Street in San Francisco. It was the occasion when Allen Ginsberg first performed his poem "Howl". The reading heralded the birth of the Beat Generation. This birth took place within the West Coast literary ferment known as the San Francisco Poetry Renaissance.

== History ==
In July 1952, artist and theater director W. Edwin Ver Becke founded San Francisco Community Theater at 3119 Fillmore Street, an address that had previously been listed as 3115 Fillmore. The group’s plays were usually shown at the California Palace of the Legion of Honor but the 3119 address served as their headquarters and also as an art gallery that displayed work by Antonio Sotomayor. The venture did not last long and soon artists Jess Collins and Harry Jacobus, along with poet Robert Duncan, took over the building’s lease, founding the King Ubu Gallery (an allusion to Alfred Jarry’s 1896 play Ubu Roi). Collins and Duncan bought the stage lighting from Ver Becke but made minimal changes prior to opening their gallery on December 20, 1952.

King Ubu lasted for one year before closing. Ten months later, the address was taken over by five painter friends (Wally Hedrick, Deborah Remington, John Allen Ryan, David Simpson, and Hayward King), and the poet Jack Spicer, who was their teacher at the nearby California School of Fine Arts. They decided to call it "the 6 Gallery" as there were six founders. The name was Remington's idea. Later historians have used the word "Six" but Remington confirmed in a subsequent interview that the gallery was always meant to have the numeral form as its name. A plywood "6" was hung outside the front door and wrapped in fairy lights. The group held fundraising events to cover the cost of plasterboard to give the gallery space to display paintings.

The gallery was run as a cooperative with a rotating director, but Hedrick kept the role as no one else wanted it. He was replaced in 1957 by Manuel Neri. Hedrick's wife Jay DeFeo was one of the first non-founding members and acted as secretary when John Allen Ryan was out of town. The gallery became a focal point of the city's arts scene and was praised in the local press. Various experimental art shows were held there including poetry readings, plays, light shows, nude dances, and much that is hard to categorize. On January 20, the gallery held a reading of Robert Duncan's play Faust Foutu, which was attended by Allen Ginsberg and Peter Orlovsky. Duncan stripped naked at the end of the show, which inspired Ginsberg and gave the gallery "an aura of notoriety", according to one historian.

=== October 1955 reading ===
As Ginsberg recalled, "The Six Gallery reading had come about when Wally Hedrick, who was a painter and one of the major people there, asked [Kenneth] Rexroth if he knew any poets that would put on a reading." Rexroth liked the idea of staging a showcase for local poets, and he recommended that Hedrick speak to Ginsberg. Hedrick approached Ginsberg in summer of 1955 and requested his assistance in identifying Bay Area poets for a reading at "The 6". According to Jonah Raskin:

At first, Ginsberg refused. He didn't know enough local poets, he said, and he didn't feel that there was enough worthwhile Bay Area poetry to warrant a reading. But once he'd written a rough draft of Howl, he changed his "fucking mind," as he put it. A reading would provide an occasion both for his birth as a poet and for the birth of the Beat Generation, which had been slowly germinating for years.

Peter Forakis created a poster announcing the reading. A hundred postcards were mailed. Ginsberg supplied the text for the postcards, which were titled "6 Poets at 6 Gallery":

Philip Lamantia reading mss. of late John Hoffman—Mike McClure, Allen Ginsberg, Gary Snyder & Phil Whalen—all sharp new straightforward writing—remarkable collection of angels on one stage reading their poetry. No charge, small collection for wine and postcards. Charming event.
Kenneth Rexroth, M.C.

Starting at about 8:00 p.m. on October 7, 1955, Philip Lamantia, Michael McClure, Philip Whalen, Ginsberg, and Gary Snyder—who until then were known only within a close group of friends and by a few established writers such as Lionel Trilling and William Carlos Williams—presented a sampling of their latest works. For McClure and Ginsberg, it was their first ever public reading. They were introduced by Rexroth, a San Francisco poet of an older generation, who acted as a kind of father-figure for the young poets, and had helped build their burgeoning literary community through his weekly salons. An estimated 100–125 people were in attendance that night. The gallery space was not especially large, measuring 20 x 25 feet with a dirt floor.

Lamantia read poems written by his dead friend John Hoffman. McClure read five of his own poems, including "Point Lobos Animism" and "For the Death of 100 Whales"; Whalen read "Plus Ca Change"; and Snyder read "A Berry Feast". Most famously, it was at this Six Gallery event that Ginsberg first read "Howl". It was still incomplete, with only a draft of Part I available, but it electrified the audience.

The attendees included a drunken Jack Kerouac, who collected donations for wine, "the reading itself delayed while he ran out for gallon jugs, which were passed around throughout the reading." He declined to read his own work but cheered the other poets on, shouting "Yeah! Go! Go!" during their performances. Nevertheless, Kerouac was able to recall much of what occurred, and wrote a thinly fictionalized account in his 1958 novel The Dharma Bums (Ginsberg is "Alvah Goldbrook" and the poem is called "Wail"), which served to memorialize and mythologize the Six Gallery reading.

Also in the audience were Neal Cassady and City Lights publisher Lawrence Ferlinghetti, who telegrammed Ginsberg within a few hours to request the "Howl" manuscript for publication.

=== Later years ===
The Six Gallery did not remain in existence much longer. According to Hedrick's recollection, several other galleries opened nearby, and by 1957 "The 6" closed. After that, the location changed hands many times. Eventually, the Fillmore Street addresses were renumbered, and "3119" stopped being used. In 1995, Tony Willard visited the spot of the original Six Gallery building, and wrote that it "houses a store called Silkroute International, whose rugs and pillows spill onto the sidewalk."

Despite the changes on Fillmore, there have been attempts to preserve the history of the October 1955 event. On October 7, 2005, San Francisco Supervisor Michela Alioto-Pier, along with Ferlinghetti, dedicated a bronze plaque in front of a restaurant on 3115 Fillmore to commemorate the 50th anniversary of the reading of "Howl".
