= Walter Hopps =

American museum director, gallerist, and curator of contemporary art

- Born: May 3, 1932; Los Angeles, California, U.S.
- Died: March 20, 2005 (aged 72); Los Angeles, California, U.S.
- Occupations: museum director, curator, gallerist
- Spouses: Shirley Neilsen (m. 1955; div. 1966) Helen Goldberg (m. 1970; div. 1977) Caroline Huber (m. 1983)

Walter Wain "Chico" Hopps III (May 3, 1932 – March 20, 2005) was an American museum director, gallerist, and curator of contemporary art. Hopps helped bring Los Angeles post-war artists to prominence during the 1960s, and later went on to redefine practices of curatorial installation internationally. He is known for contributing decisively to “the emergence of the museum as a place to show new art.” (Roberta Smith, New York Times)

== Early life and education ==
Hopps was born on May 3, 1932, into a family of surgeons and doctors in Los Angeles, California.

He experienced pneumonia without access to antibiotics and hallucinations during high fever, visualizing psychedelic colors in the curtains. Walter received tutoring from his grandmother and became fascinated with diverse subjects through extensive reading and exploring the family library. Home-tutored until junior high school, he then attended the Polytechnic School in Pasadena, followed by Eagle Rock High School.[2] Assignment to Eagle Rock’s arts-enrichment program led to acquaintance with pioneering Modern Art collectors Walter and Louise Arensberg, and eventually to their mentorship of young Hopps.[5] Walter's encounter with the Arensbergs, who possessed a rich collection of modern art, influenced his artistic vision and curatorial practices.

Walter's father involved himself in Native American culture through the Woodcraft Rangers, and fashioned a medicine bag to ward off illness. Hopps learned about societal inequalities from his father, who was open about race and empathy. Walter faced numerous challenges in securing venues and working within systemic barriers, yet he was undeterred and continued to promote jazz as a legitimate art form. Walter encountered prominent jazz musicians and formed friendships with figures like Dave Brubeck, while also trying to book concerts with legendary artists. Walter's early art experiences and exhibitions revealed a commitment to sharing the works of underrepresented artists and a desire to encourage conversations around modern art's significance.

In 1950, Hopps enrolled at Stanford University. After one year, Hopps transferred to the University of California, Los Angeles (UCLA), to study microbiology[2] and art history. Walter's university experience blended artistic passion with entrepreneurial spirit, leading him to organize jazz events and establish his presence in both the jazz and contemporary art scenes.

Syndell Studio opened in 1952 and featured works by children alongside prominent artists like Sonia Gechtoff and Paul Sarkisian. Syndell Studio was named in memory of Maurice Syndell, a farmer who committed suicide, and whose name inspired the gallery founder to create art that would honor his legacy.

Walter Hopps was drafted during the Korean War and negotiated a role as a first-aid man before being honorably discharged.While in the army, plans were developed for a significant "Action" art show, which took place in 1955 at the Santa Monica Pier.

Ferus Gallery quickly gained attention for featuring influential artists and holding avant-garde events, further establishing an artistic community.

== Collaborations and exhibitions ==
Walter Hopp's 53-year career was marked by numerous and often overlapping collaborations, as well as his mentorship of younger professionals. Outcomes included the creation of a number of well-known cultural venues, exhibitions of modern and contemporary art, and notable museum and curatorial assignments:

- 1952-1954: Concert Hall Workshop was co-founded by Hopps and Stanford classmate Jim Newman (founder of Dilexi Gallery in San Francisco) with Craig Kauffman, among others, to present contemporary music (mostly jazz). Beginning with their acquaintance at Stanford, the working relationship of Hopps and Newman extended for several years (see Syndell Studio, below).
- 1952-1955: Syndell Studio was co-founded by Hopps and Jim Newman, with the involvement of Ben and Betty Bartosh, Michael Scoles, Craig Kaufman and Shirley Neilsen (Dream Colony resource) to provide a venue for local artists.[6] Its final exhibition, Action 1: Concert Hall Workshop Presents Action Painting of the West Coast (better known as The Merry-Go-Round Show) was staged at the Santa Monica Pier using large tarpaulins and the pier’s merry-go-round structure (augmented by additional other) to install 100 paintings by forty artists. Mostly from San Francisco, exhibitors included Sonia Gechtoff, Richard Diebenkorn, Mark Rothko, Clyfford Still, Paul Sarkisian and Jay De Feo.[6][7][8]
- 1956: Studio Gallery begin in Hopps’ personal Brentwood studio with a schedule that included the first presentation of paintings by occultist Marjorie Cameron; several of her paintings were destroyed by fire.[12]
- 1957-1962: Ferus Gallery (1957-1966) was co-founded by Hopps and artist Edward Kienholz (1957-1958), later joined by Irving Blum (1958-1966).[13] The exhibitions staged at Ferus' included Andy Warhol's first west coast exhibition (32 Campbell's Soup Cans) later bought in by Blum on Hopps’ advice (collection of the Museum of Modern Art, New York).[14] Ferus went on to exhibit artists Jasper Johns, Roy Lichtenstein, Frank Stella, and west coast artists including Ed Ruscha and others.
- 1962-1974: Curator and then Director, Pasadena Art Museum (renamed Norton Simon Museum after 1974). Hopps’ exhibitions included the first retrospectives of Joseph Cornell and Marcel Duchamp, an expanded installation of the Museum of Modern Art’s Kurt Schwitters: A Retrospective Exhibition and Pop Art’s first museum survey (American Pop Art: New Painting of Common Objects). During this period Hopps was named the most “gifted museum man on the west coast” by the New York Times.
- 1965: United States Commissioner, Sao Paulo Bienal.
- 1967-1972: Director, Corcoran Gallery of Art (Washington Gallery of Modern Art until 1970). Hopps was terminated in 1972 due to his support for the museum staff’s effort to unionize.
- 1972: United States Commissioner, Venice Biennale in 1972.
- 1972 – 1979: Curator, 20th Century American Art at the Smithsonian’s National Collection of Fine Arts (NCFA), (National Museum of American Art after 1980). Hopps’ exhibitions included an exhaustive retrospective of Robert Rauschenberg as the museum’s Bicentennial presentation.[18]
- 1973: Joseph Cornell Study Center (Smithsonian American Art Museum). The JCSC was established by Hopps and Lynda Hartigan to preserve the artist’s work, studio material and archives.
- 1978: 36 Hours at Washington DC’s Museum of Temporary Art (MOTA) was staged to bring the institution, its exhibition space and its professional staff into direct interaction with its regional constituency of artists. 36 Hours called on them to submit any artwork of any kind within a 36 hour time frame (subject only to size limits). Hopps remained on site for the duration to perform the installation of the art (426 works were exhibited).
- 1980: Director, Rice Museum, Institute for the Arts at Rice University, Houston, Texas.
- 1979-1989: Director, Menil Collection, Houston, Texas. Initially serving as consultant to the museum, Hopps was named its founding director in 1980. His involvement ranged from assisting in the architectural process of creating the museum’s new building (designed by Renzo Piano) to overseeing the relocation of its collections, and establishing its collection and exhibition practice in collaboration with Dominique de Menil and others.
- 1989: Adjunct Curator, Menil Collection. Hopps resigned as Director of the Menil in order to devote himself to independent curatorial work and collaborations.
- 1996: Kienholz: a Retrospective was organized with Alberta Mayo for presentation at the Whitney Museum of American Art (NYC), the Museum of Contemporary Art (LA) and the Berlinische Galerie (Berlin).
- 1997-1999: Robert Rauschenberg: a Retrospective, organized with Susan Davidson, was presented at the Solomon R Guggenheim Museum, the Guggenheim Museum Soho, and the Guggenheim Museum at Ace Gallery (simultaneously); the Menil Collection, the Contemporary Arts Museum Houston, and the Museum of Fine Arts Houston (simultaneously); the Museum Ludwig (Koln); and the Guggenheim Museum Bilbao.
- 2001: Senior Curator, Solomon R Guggenheim Museum, concurrent with his adjunct position at Menil.
- 2003-2005: James Rosenquist: a Retrospective, organized with Sarah Bancroft, was presented at the Menil Collection and Museum of Fine Arts Houston (simultaneously), the Solomon R. Guggenheim Museum (NY), the Guggenheim Museum Bilbao, and The Kunstmuseum, Wolfsburg (DE).

== Mentorship ==
Reflecting Hopps’ record of mentorship, in 2001 The Menil Collection established the Walter Hopps Award for Curatorial Achievement, to be given biennially to a distinguished mid-career curator making an original contribution to the field. The award is endowed to establish an accompanying stipend ($20,000) and includes the opportunity to deliver a lecture at the museum (Peter Plagens: “The Brass Ring of Modern Art”). The recipients have included Documenta 14’s Adam Szymczyk, the Museum of Modern Art’s Thomas J. Lax, LAXART’s Hamza Walker and the Solomon R. Guggenheim Foundation’s (Abu Dhabi) Reem Fadda.[20]

Other notable mentees included Lynda Hartigan (Smithsonian Institution); Deborah (Jensen) Velders (Smithsonian Institution, MOTA, and the Menil Collection); Neil Printz (at National Collection of Fine Arts and at Menil), Alberta Mayo (Kienholz: a Retrospective), Susan Davidson (Robert Rauschenberg: A Retrospective) and Sarah Bancroft (James Rosenquist: a Retrospective).

== Personal life ==
Many of Hopps’ collaborators were close friends, or became close friends during their work together. His professional and personal lives were similarly interwoven. His marriage to art historian and Syndell Studio/Ferus Gallery associate Shirley Neilsen ended in divorce, 1966. In 1970 Hopps married Helen Goldberg (divorced 1977). His final marriage, to Caroline Huber, Director of DiverseWorks Art and Performance Space (Houston), was marked by his revived interest in undiscovered artists, and involvement with the city’s vibrant arts and literary community.

== Death and legacy ==
Hopps died on March 20, 2005, in Los Angeles, after a brief hospitalization at Cedars-Sinai Medical Center.

Writing in The New Yorker magazine in 1991, critic Calvin Tomkins sought to describe Hopps's approach to curatorial work, saying,

"His sensitivity to works of art takes in not only the works of art themselves but the dialogue that he believes can and should occur between one work and another, provided the placement, the lighting, the sightlines can all be worked out. In a Hopps exhibition, considerations of art history and scholarship are often present, along with ideas about style and influence and social issues, but the primary emphasis is always on how the art looks on the wall, and this, surprisingly, makes Walter Hopps something of a maverick in his profession."[19]

In her 2005 obituary of Hopps, New York Times critic Roberta Smith observed that Hopps's career "contributed significantly to the emergence of the museum as a place to show new art." [15] The Washington Post described him as a "sort of a gonzo museum director—elusive, unpredictable, outlandish in his range, jagged in his vision, heedless of rules.”[3]
