= Deborah Remington =

American abstract painter

- Born: Deborah Remington; June 25, 1930; Haddonfield, New Jersey, U.S.
- Died: April 21, 2010 (age 79); Moorestown, New Jersey, U.S.
- Education: Philadelphia Museum School of Industrial Art, San Francisco Art Institute,
- Known for: Abstract painting
- Movement: Abstract Hard-edge painting
- Website: deborahremington.com

"Haddonfield," 1965

Deborah Remington (June 25, 1930 – April 21, 2010) was an American abstract painter. Her most notable work is characterized as Hard-edge painting abstraction.

She became a part of the San Francisco Bay Area's Beat scene in the 1950s. In 1965, she moved to New York where her style solidified and her career grew substantially. A twenty-year retrospective of her work was exhibited at the Newport Harbor Art Museum in California, in 1983.

Her work was a part of more than thirty solo exhibition and hundreds of group exhibitions including three Whitney Museum of American Art annuals. She was the descendant of artist Frederic Remington.

== Biography ==
Remington was born in 1930 and grew up in Haddonfield, New Jersey. She was the daughter of the late Malcolm VanDyke and Hazel (née Stewart) Remington. With an early inclination towards art, she enrolled in classes at the Philadelphia Museum School of Industrial Art as a teenager. In 1955, she received her BFA from the San Francisco Art Institute where members of the faculty included Clyfford Still, David Park, Hassel Smith, and Jack Spicer, among others.

By the time she graduated from the institute, she had become affiliated with the Bay Area's Beat scene. In 1954, she was one of six painters and poets, and the only woman, who founded the legendary 6 Gallery in San Francisco.

After graduation, Remington spent two years traveling and living in Japan, Southeast Asia, and India. While in Japan she studied classical and contemporary calligraphy and earned money by teaching English and tutoring actors. This led to some work acting in B movies, including the film "Nightmare's Bad Dream".

Returning to the United States, she took up painting more seriously. She began to exhibit her work at the Dilexi Gallery in San Francisco and had solo shows in 1962, 1963, and 1965. In 1965, Remington moved to New York City. She had her first solo exhibition in NYC in 1966 at the Bykert Gallery at 15 W. 57th Street in Manhattan. She had four solo shows there between 1967 and 1974.

In 1983 Remington had a twenty-year retrospective exhibition that opened at the Newport Harbor Museum in California. This exhibition later traveled to the Oakland Museum. In 1984 she received a Guggenheim Fellowship.

She was elected to the National Academy of Design in 1999, and in the same year was the recipient of a Pollock-Krasner Foundation Grant.

== Death ==
Remington died April 21, 2010, in Moorestown, New Jersey, of cancer, aged 79. She was interred at Haddonfield Baptist Cemetery in Haddonfield, New Jersey.

== Selected collections ==
Remington's work has been collected by numerous institutions both in the United States and abroad: the Art Institute of Chicago, Illinois; the Auckland War Memorial Museum, New Zealand; the Bibliothèque nationale de France, Paris; the Museum Boijmans Van Beuningen, Rotterdam, the Netherlands; the Centre national d'art et de culture Georges-Pompidou, Paris; the Columbus Museum of Art, Columbus, Ohio; the Berkeley Art Museum and Pacific Film Archive, University of California, Berkeley, California; the Smithsonian American Art Museum (formerly National Museum of American Art), Washington, D.C.; The National Gallery of Art, Washington, D.C. and the Whitney Museum of American Art, New York.

== Awards and recognition ==
In 1999, Remington was elected to the National Academy of Design and received a Pollock-Krasner Foundation Grant that same year. She was awarded a National Endowment Fellowship from 1979 to 1980. From 1973 to 1981, Remington was a Tamarind Fellow Artist-in-Residence.

== Legacy ==
In 2016 her work was included in the exhibition Women of Abstract Expressionism organized by the Denver Art Museum. In 2023 her work was included in the exhibition Action, Gesture, Paint: Women Artists and Global Abstraction 1940-1970 at the Whitechapel Gallery in London.
