= Asian American Women Artists Association =

Women's art club in San Francisco

Asian American Women Artists Association (AAWAA) is a nonprofit arts organization that supports and promotes the work of Asian American women artists in the visual, literary, and performing arts through activities such as art events, lectures, artists salons, and member exhibitions.

Based in San Francisco, it was founded in 1989 by artists including Flo Oy Wong, Betty Kano, Moira Roth, and Bernice Bing.

== History ==
Kano and Wong were motivated to found the AAWAA after attending the 1989 national meeting of the Women's Caucus for Art, where they felt that Asian American women were heavily underrepresented, and by joining a project started by Moira Roth to create a collection of slides of artworks by women of color. The first meeting was held at Kano's home in Berkeley in March of that year.

In 2007, the organization formally incorporated as a 501(c)(3) non-profit.

AAWAA's Speakers Bureau consists of artists, scholars, writers, and administrators who present at institutions regarding topics such as women's issues, Asian American issues, artists' process, and AAWAA programs. Members of the Speakers Bureau have lectured at numerous institutions in California.

=== AAWA Board ===
Cynthia Tom (President), Shari Arai DeBoer (Secretary/Treasurer), Sigi Arnejo, Linda Inson Choy, Michelle Lee, Vinay Patel, and Pallavi Sharma.

=== Advisory board ===
Susan Almazol, Renee Baldocchi, Gracie Chidmat, Lori Chinn, Lydia Nakashima Degarrod, Natalie Gore, Nancy Hom, Anh-Hoa Thi Nguyen, Isabelle Thuy Pelaud, and Sue Tom.

== Membership ==
Membership to the AAWAA is open to all, as either an artist member or an affiliate member. Notable members include Kathy Aoki, Bernice Bing, Lenore Chinn, Nancy Hom, Betty Kano, Dawn Nakanishi, Julia LaChica, Genny Lim, Isabelle Thuy-Pelaud, Canyon Sam, Valerie Soe, Flo Oy Wong, Wendy Yoshimura, and Katherine Westerhout.

== Publications ==
=== Cheers to Muses: Contemporary Works by Asian American Women (2007) ===
Cheers to Muses is an anthology published by the AAWAA in 2007. The book compiles 77 works, including fine art, poetry, creative writing, and non-fiction work. The works are created by 64 Asian American women ranging in age from 14 to 85.

=== Entering the Picture (2012) ===
Entering the Picture is a collection about contributions of feminists to American art. It is an interdisciplinary collection of essays by artists and scholars, many of whom were eyewitnesses to landmark events, relates how feminists produced vibrant bodies of art in Fresno and other locales where similar collaborations flourished.

=== The Worlds of Bernice Bing (2013) ===
The Worlds of Bernice Bing is a documentary short film produced by the AAWAA, featuring the life and work of the lesbian Chinese American artist Bernice Bing. The film is directed by Madeleine Lim, executive artistic director of the Queer Women of Color Media Arts Project

In 2013, the film received the Audience Award at the Queer Women of Color Film Festival.

=== Local Invisibility, Postcolonial Feminisms (2018) ===
Local Invisibility, Postcolonial Feminisms talks about studies in gender, sexuality, and culture. It looks into postcolonial poetic and artistic work of four generations of female Asian American artists in the San Francisco Bay Area. There is a chapter on the AAWAA (Asian American Women Artists Association).

== Activities ==
=== Emerging Curators Program ===
This program aims to stress an Asian American Women lens to curation, to promote Asian American Women in the arts, from a curating perspective and also benefits the artists who are under represented and lack exposure.

=== Mural Muses ===
In 2015, in honor of its 25th anniversary, the AAWAA launched a campaign to create a large collective mural in San Francisco's Richmond District.

The mural is to honor the contributions of women artists in the Asian-American and Pacific Islander community. It is a response to the increased racial tensions and vandalism, and to increase the visibility of Asian American female artists. "Mural Muses" will be one of the large-scale murals in the Bay Area to honor Asian-American artists.

Melanie Elvena, programs manager at the AAWAA stated that the collaborative mural was another way to raise awareness for Asian-American women artists "in a space that has been traditionally male dominated."

=== A Place of Her Own ===
A Place of Her Own (PLACE) is an art-based program, first created in 2008 by the AAWAA director Cynthia Tom. It is dedicated to improving women's mental health and seeks to challenge issues like colonization, racism, forced migration, and gender oppression. It is based around the question in Virginia Woolf's A Room of One's Own: "If you had a place of your own, what would it be?" The weekly workshops over the course of six months lead up to a professionally curated exhibition. PLACE is open to all women, regardless of art ability of experience, and uses various art mediums.

PLACE offers down to earth healing tools, that relieve stress while opening up our ability to access and trust our intuition. The work is designed to help release underlying patterns and old habits and their links to individual, family and cultural histories and patterns of dysfunction. In order to thrive and take ownership of our life's path, women must define what is important to them alone, practicing self love and self-care.

== Exhibitions ==
=== Shifting Movements: Art Inspired by the Life & Activism of Yuri Kochiyama (1921–2014) ===
The AAWAA and the Asian Pacific Islander Cultural Center (APICC) presented this art exhibition as part of the United States of Asian America Festival opening at SOMArts Cultural Center from May 4–25, 2017. Shifting Movements features 40 artists working in various mediums, mostly from Asian Pacific American, African-American, and Latin-American backgrounds. The exhibition honors the Japanese-American activist Yuri Kochiyama. Shifting Movements also featured oral history recordings, a public installation created by the community, and the Smithsonian Asian Pacific American Center online exhibition Folk Hero: Remembering Yuri Kochiyama Through Grassroots Art.

=== underCurrents & the Quest for Space (2013) ===
underCurrents & the Quest for Space features the space occupied by Asian America - socially, artistically and physically. It is a multidisciplinary arts exhibition that addresses topics such as "model minority", and challenges faced by Asian American society such as stereotypes, discrimination and invisibility. It is a joined force with Asian Pacific Islander Cultural Center (APICC).

=== Eating cultures (2014) ===
Eating Cultures is a multi-disciplinary arts exhibition of artworks inspired by Asian American food and foodways. Artists share stories of global fusion, and importance of food in Asian communities globally.

=== Hungry Ghosts (2015) ===
Hungry Ghosts exhibition uses the concept of "Hungry Ghosts", a common concept throughout many Asian cultures and religions, to explore the unsatisfied ghosts of the individual and collective historical struggles that continue to cast an effect the community. It is co-presented by the Manilatown Heritage Foundation.

=== Transformation (2015) ===
The exhibition took place on the 25th anniversary year of the AAWAA. It features the works of 38 AAWAA artists members, and highlights the diversity, creativity, and evolution of its artist community.

=== Agrarianaa: Art Inspired by APA Agricultural Roots (2019) ===
Agrarianaa: Art Inspired by APA Agricultural Roots is a multimedia exhibition featuring artists and farmers rooted in the history of Asian Pacific American agricultural crafts and legacies. The exhibition addresses topics including migrant labor, environmental activism, land and food sovereignty. It includes artists who talks about how a regenerative agricultural ecosystem can support into the resilient spaces for community.

== See also ==
- Women artists
- Smithsonian Asian Pacific American Center
- Bernice Bing
- Lenore Chinn
- Betty Nobue Kano
- Yuri Kochiyama
- Genny Lim
- Madeleine Lim
- Moira Roth
- Canyon Sam
- Flo Oy Wong
- Wendy Yoshimura
