= Flo Oy Wong =

Chinese-American artist (1938–2026)

- Born: October 28, 1938; Oakland, California, U.S.
- Died: April 11, 2026 (aged 87)
- Education: University of California, Berkeley, California State University, Hayward, DeAnza College, Foothill College
- Occupations: Artist, curator, educator
- Movement: Mixed media

Flo Oy Wong (Chinese: 朱令愛; October 28, 1938 – April 11, 2026) was an American artist, curator and educator of Chinese-descent. She co-founded the Asian American Women Artists Association (AAWAA) in San Francisco.

== Life and career ==
Flo Oy Wong was born on October 28, 1938, in Oakland, California. She was granted a Bachelor of Arts in English from the University of California, Berkeley in 1960, qualifying as a teacher at California State University, Hayward a year later. Her intent was initially to teach high school students, but she found that it was more enjoyable to teach small children, and focused on a career doing that; this ended when she had her own children and left the teaching profession.

Wong began studying art in 1978, attending DeAnza College until 1980 followed by a stint at Foothill College until 1982. In 1989, she co-founded the Asian American Women Artists Association with Betty Nobue Kano, Moira Roth, and Bernice Bing. In 1990 she and Jan Rindfleisch curated the exhibition Families: Rebuilding, Recreating, Reinventing at the Euphrat Museum of Art, This exhibition featured artwork by other notable Asian American Artists: Terry Acebo Davis, Kim Anno, Lucy Arai, Lenore Chinn, DIWA Arts & Anna Wong. These artists, whose work was already known in the Asian American artistic communities, would later reciprocate by including Oy-Wong's work in other political and identity exhibitions they curated at other SF Bay Area venues during that dynamic period. Flo two years later was given the Art and the Needs of Children and Youth Award. In 1995, Wong was given an award by the Women's Caucus for Art, and served as a visiting scholar at the University of Wisconsin, Madison. In 1997 she was awarded fellowships by both the Arts Council of Santa Clara and the Nebraska Arts Council.

In 2000 her piece made in usa: Angel Island Shhh was installed at the United States Immigration Station, Angel Island, where between 100,000 and 175,000 Chinese immigrants had been detained, influenced by the experiences of her mother and mother-in-law who had immigrated from China. She has also created other works exploring Asian American history and experience, including ones about Wen Ho Lee and Japanese internment camps. In 2008, the Asian American Pacific Islander Cultural Center honored Wong by presenting an exhibition showcasing her work: 70/30; Seventy Years of Living, Thirty Years of Art.

In 2013 she hosted an exhibition at the Luggage Store Gallery celebrating her 75th birthday, which featured works by Moira Roth and Wong's sister, Nellie Wong. In 2018, she published a book, Dreaming of Glistening Pomelos, for her 80th birthday.

Wong died on April 11, 2026, at the age of 87.

== Bibliography ==
- Farris, Phoebe (1999). Women Artists of Color: A Bio-Critical Sourcebook to 20th Century Artists in the Americas. Greenwood Press. ISBN 0313303746.
- Hallmark, Kara Kelley (2007). Encyclopedia of Asian American Artists. Greenwood Publishing Group. ISBN 978-0313334511.
