= Nellie Wong =

American poet (1934–2026)

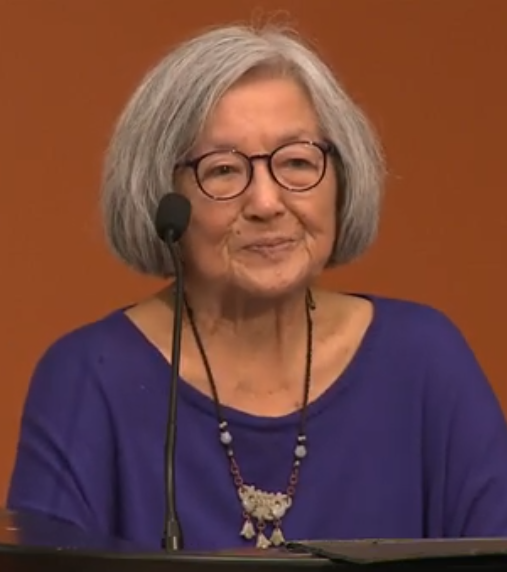
- At a poetry reading at the San Francisco Public Library in 2024
- Born: September 12, 1934; Oakland, California, U.S.
- Died: January 2, 2026 (aged 91); San Francisco, California, U.S.
- Occupations: Poet, activist
- Political party: Freedom Socialist Party

Nellie Wong (September 12, 1934 – January 2, 2026) was an American poet and activist for feminist and socialist causes. Wong was also an active member of the Freedom Socialist Party and Radical Women.

== Biography ==
Wong was born in Oakland, California, to Chinese immigrants. Her father had immigrated to Oakland in 1912. Wong was a Chinese American poet, feminist, and socialist who has organized and participated in activist groups working to create better conditions for women, workers, and minorities.

During World War II, the Wong family worked in a grocery store in Berkeley. The internment of her Japanese American neighbors left a profound impact on her intellectual development, sensitizing her to issues of racism and the concerns of Asian Americans. The family borrowed $2,000 to start a restaurant, The Great China, in Oakland's Chinatown, where Wong worked as a waitress during her youth. She attended public school, graduating from Oakland High School, and started full work as a secretary for the Bethlehem Steel Corporation, a position she held until 1982. She later served as senior analyst in affirmative action at the University of California, San Francisco (UCSF).

While in her mid-30s, Wong began studying creative writing at San Francisco State University (SFSU) and began to write and publish her poetry. Wong credits her feminist classmates at SFSU with encouraging her writing. A male professor had once told her to throw away an angry poem she had written. One classmate told her, "You don't have to listen to him!"

While a student at San Francisco State University, Wong was involved with the campus Women Writers Union, which organized around issues of race, sex, and class. In the late 1970s, alongside Chinese American women writers Nancy Hom, Genny Lim, Canyon Sam, Kitty Tsui and Merle Woo, Wong co-founded and organized the feminist literary and performance group Unbound Feet. The group performed at colleges, universities, and community centers. During this time she encountered members of two affiliated socialist feminist organizations, Radical Women and the Freedom Socialist Party, and within a few years had joined their ranks.

In 1983, Wong traveled to China on the first U.S. Women Writers Tour to China sponsored by the US–China Peoples Friendship Association with Tillie Olsen, Alice Walker, Paule Marshall. Also in 1983 she was a major organizer of the Merle Woo Defense Committee. Woo, a lesbian Korean-Chinese American feminist, had filed a complaint against their former employer alleging wrongful termination based on discrimination. Working with other Freedom Socialist Party and Radical Women members, Wong raised funds and awareness of the case. Two legal cases were won against the defendant.

From 1983 to 1985 Wong taught poetry writing at Mills College in Oakland and playwriting at the Asian American Theater Company in San Francisco.

During the 1980s and 1990s, Wong was keynote speaker at many national and regional conferences, including Third World Women and Feminist Perspectives, Women Against Racism, and the National Women's Studies Association. She has recited her poetry in China, Cuba, Australia, and throughout the U.S. She has also participated on panels concerning labor, Asian American literature, and poetry. Furthermore, Wong has taught Women's studies at the University of Minnesota and poetry writing at Mills College in Oakland, California.

In 2019, Wong, Genny Lim and Flo Oy Wong began performing together as The Last Hoisan Poets, conducting special poetry readings in English and Hoisan-wa (also known as Taishanese, a Yue Chinese dialect native to Taishan, Guangdong) to pay homage to their mother language which is at risk of fading from collective memory.

Excerpts from two of her poems have been permanently installed as plaques at public sites at the San Francisco Municipal Railway. She received awards from the Women's Foundation (San Francisco), University of California, Santa Barbara's Asian American Faculty and Staff Association, and the San Francisco-based Kearny Street Workshop, a multidisciplinary art collective. She served many years as the Bay Area organizer of the Freedom Socialist Party, and remained active with the party, Radical Women, and Bay Area United Against War. She later resided in San Francisco.

Wong died from ovarian cancer at her home in San Francisco, on January 2, 2026, at the age of 91.

== Work ==
To mark her 90th birthday, poet and activist Nellie Wong's fifth collection of poetry, Nothing Like Freedom, published by HoongHoongLookLook Press, bridges the decades of her remarkable career, with work that spans the 1970s to the present (2024). Wong's first collection of poetry, Dreams in Harrison Railroad Park (1977), was published by Kelsey Street Press. This book went through four printings and was the most successful release in the history of Kelsey Street Press. Her other titles are The Death of Long Steam Lady (1986), published by West End Press and Stolen Moments (1997). Her work has appeared in approximately 200 anthologies and publications.

Wong writes directly from her working life; she states "A lot of my poems come from the workplace; that's where I've experienced a great deal of sexism and racism." Other themes include her family history and Asian American identity, about which she has said, "I care about the roots of Asian American culture and how and why they came here [...] It's something every Asian family has experienced." Her poetry spans issues of feminism, the fight against racism, workplace injustice, and finding identity as a writer and activist.

In 1981, Wong participated with Mitsuye Yamada in the documentary film Mitsuye & Nellie, Asian American Poets, produced by Allie Light and Irving Saraf. The film recounts the experiences and hardships that affected the writers and their families. Significant to the film's focus is how World War II and the bombing of Pearl Harbor encouraged divisive perceptions of Japanese as "bad" Asians, while the Chinese were seen as "good" Asians. "Can't Tell," one of the poems Wong recites in the film, highlights the author's attempt to understand why her Japanese neighbors were being sent to internment camps when she and her family, as Chinese Americans, were considered patriotic citizens.

The film also shows lively exchanges between Wong and her siblings, highlighting the feistiness of her older sister, Li Keng, also an author, and her youngest sister, Flo Oy Wong, an installation artist. Her brother, William Wong, is a journalist and the author of Yellow Journalist: Dispatches from Asian America.

Her papers are housed at the California Ethnic and Multicultural Archives. In 2022, she received a Reginald Lockett Lifetime Achievement Award from PEN Oakland.

== Bibliography ==
=== Books ===
- Wong, Nellie (2024). Nothing Like Freedom. San Francisco, California: HoongHoongLookLook Press. p. 122. ISBN 979-8-9914008-0-0.
- Wong, Nellie (2012). Breakfast Lunch Dinner. San Francisco, California: Meridien PressWorks. p. 134. ISBN 1-891132-19-9.
- Wong, Nellie; Merle Woo; Mitsuye Yamada (2003). Three Asian American Writers Speak Out on Feminism. Seattle, Washington: Red Letter Press. p. 48. ISBN 0-9725403-5-0.
- Alaniz, Yolanda; Wong, Nellie, eds. (1999). Voices of Color: Reports from the Front Lines of Resistance by Radicals of Color. Seattle, Washington: Red Letter Press. pp. 160. ISBN 0-932323-05-7.
- Wong, Nellie (1997). Stolen Moments. Goshen, Connecticut: Chicory Blue Press. p. 43. ISBN 1887344039.
- Wong, Nellie (1986). The Death of Long Steam Lady. Los Angeles, California: West End Press. p. 67. ISBN 0-931122-42-2.
- Wong, Nellie (1977). Dreams in Harrison Railroad Park: Poems. Berkeley, California: Kelsey St. Press. p. 45. ISBN 0-932716-14-8.

=== Other ===
- When I Was Growing Up, autobiographical poem
- In search of the self as hero: confetti of voices on New Year's night, Cherríe Moraga; Gloria Anzaldúa, eds. (1983). This Bridge called my back : writings by radical women of color (First ed.). Watertown, Massachusetts: Persephone Press. pp. 177–181. ISBN 9780930436100.
- For an Asian woman who says my poetry gives her a stomachache, Geok-lin Lim; Mayumi Tsutakawa; Margarita Donnelly, eds. (1988). The forbidden stitch: an Asian American women's anthology. Corvalis, Oregon: Calyx. pp. 86–87.
- Broad shoulders, Asian Women of California, ed. (1989). Making waves: an anthology of writings by and about Asian American Women. Boston: Beacon. pp. 260–265. ISBN 978-0-8070-5905-0.
- Moving to her new house, and We go as American tourists, Marie Harris; Kathleen Aguerro, eds. (1988). An ear to the ground: an anthology of contemporary American poets. Athens: University of Georgia Press. pp. 303–304.
- A woman at the window, Mary Anne Ferguson, ed. (1991). Images of women in literature (Fifth ed.). Boston: Houghton Mifflin. pp. 556–557.
- So near, so far, My Chinese love, Unwritten letter, Reverberations, Give me no flowers, Where is my country, When I was growing up, and Away from the blue swans, L. Ling-chi Wang; Henry Yiheng Zhao, eds. (1991). Chinese American powerty: an anthology. Santa Barbara, California: Asian American Voices. pp. 202–214.
- Socialist Feminism, Chandra Talpade Mohanty; Ann Russo; Lourdes Torres, eds. (1991). Third world women and the politics of feminism. Bloomington, Indiana: Indiana University Press. pp. 288–296. ISBN 978-0-253-20632-9.
- Dreams in Harrison Railroad Park, Can't tell, On thinking of photographing my fantasies, On Plaza Garibaldi, and Picnic, Garrett Hongo, ed. (1993). The open boat: poems from Asian America. New York: Doubleday. pp. 268–278. ISBN 978-0-385-42338-0.
- Relining shelves and Toward a 44th birthday, Florence Howe, ed. (1993). No more masks! An anthology of twentieth-century American women poets, newly revised and expanded. New York: HarperPerennial. pp. 245–247.
- Wong, Nellie. "Praise Song for a Dead Girl." Seeds of Fire: Contemporary Poetry of the Other U. S. A., edited by Jonathan Andersen. Smokestack Books, 2008. p. 155.
- A poem of solidarity for the striking Liverpool dockers and the women and the waterfront, "LouberNet UK". LabourNet UK.
- Exploring common differences, Miss Saigon: money calls a racist tune, and You were born, Nellie Wong; Yolanda Alanniz, eds. (1999). Voices of Color. Seattle: Red Letter Press. pp. 25–29, 73–75, 154–155. ISBN 978-0-932323-05-7.
- Can't tell, Lawson Fusao Inada, ed. (2000). Only what we could carry: the Japanese American internment experience. Berkeley; San Francisco: Heyday; California Historical Society. pp. 51–52.
