= ArtSpan =

Nonprofit organization in San Francisco, California, US

- Established: 1975
- Location: San Francisco, California, U.S.
- Executive Director: Shamsher Virk

ArtSpan is a San Francisco, California, nonprofit organization that produces the oldest and largest artist open studios event in the United States. Started in 1975, ArtSpan's San Francisco Open Studios (SFOS) takes place over four weekends in the fall each year with a different city district highlighted each weekend. The Open Studios take place in a myriad of different locations within each district. Some are in art galleries, some in apartments, some in garages and some in store fronts. Local publications often make recommendations for each weekend. In 2023, over 600 local artists participated in SFOS.

== 50th anniversary ==
In 2024, San Francisco Open Studios celebrated its 50th anniversary. The inaugural event in 1975 featured 67 artists, primarily in the South of Market area. By 2024, the event had grown significantly, with around 500 artists participating across the city.

To commemorate this milestone, ArtSpan, the nonprofit organization that has managed Open Studios since 1991, organized a special exhibition titled "From Disco Days to the Tech Craze: 50 Years of ArtSpan SF Open Studios." The exhibition, held at the San Francisco Public Library's Jewett Gallery, showcased Open Studios ephemera, including maps, guides, photos from past events, and artwork from long-time participating artists.

The 2024 Open Studios event ran from September 19 through October 13, following the opening of the commemorative exhibition on September 12. Despite facing challenges such as the COVID-19 pandemic and the "great art diaspora" - artists leaving San Francisco for more affordable cities - ArtSpan's executive director, Joen Madonna, remained optimistic about the future of the arts in San Francisco, noting a shift "away from tech dominance and back toward creative dominance."

Throughout its history, San Francisco Open Studios has played a crucial role in connecting artists with the public and helping artists see themselves as professionals. The event has also adapted to changing times, including initiatives to secure affordable studio spaces for artists and programs to mentor youth artists. While many of the artist's works can be found in galleries during the year, Open Studios gives the public the opportunity to meet the artists, see a much broader representation of the artist's work than can be seen in any other exhibit short of a retrospective and to buy original art work without gallery markups.

== List of award winners ==
Artspan also hosts the San Francisco Open Studios Exhibition that includes works from over 400 Open Studio artists organized by the districts the artists are showing in. SFOS gallery curators each choose a favorite piece. The AMPLIFY: Juror's Choice Awards are presented at ArtLaunch, the event that marks the opening of the SFOS Exhibition.

AMPLIFY: Juror's Choice Award Winners
Year	Artist	Juror
2023	Joseph Abbati	James Miille, Co-founder & Managing Partner of Superfine Art Fair
2023	Andrew DeWitt	Jonathan Carver Moore, Founding Director of Jonathan Carver Moore
2023	Uma Rani Iyli	Michael Arcega, Associate Professor of Art at San Francisco State University
2023	Bussie Parker Kehoe	TaVee Lee, Manager of Transmission Gallery
2023	Bianca Levan	Valerie Imus, Artistic Director & Co-director, Southern Exposure
2022	Amber Gruhlkey	Sarah Choe, Co-owner & Director of Soft Times Gallery
2022	Debra Dee	Raul D'Mauries & Felicia Ann, Cofounders and Managing Partners of Helvella Gallery
2022	Debra Dee	Michelle A. Delaney, Manager & Owner of 111 Minna Gallery
2022	Debra Dee	Dr. Martina Ayala, executive director of the Mission Cultural Center for Latino Arts
2022	Debra Dee	Bradley Platz, Cofounder & Managing Partner of Modern Eden Gallery
2021	Uma Rani Iyli	Kelsey Issel, Arts Program Consultant & Co-owner of She Bends
2021	Uma Rani Iyli	Justin Hoover, executive director of the Chinese Historical Society of America
2021	Geneviève L'Heureux	Annette Schutz, Owner ArtHaus Consulting
2021	Mike Sanchez	Eric Murphy, Curator for Joyce Gordon Gallery
2021	Artemis Laura Schatzkin	Randolph Belle, Principal of RBA Creative
2020	Joseph Abbati	Ashley L. Voss, Owner & Director, Voss Gallery
2020	Nina Fabunmi	Eden Stein, Owner & Curator, Secession Art and Design
2020	Nina Fabunmi	Marsha Connell Studio, Sonoma County Art Professor
2020	Roberta Ahrens	Matt McKinley, Owner, McKinley Art Solutions
2020	Geneviève L'Heureux	Philip Bewley, Gallery Director & Curator, DZINE Gallery
2019	Joshua Coffy	Irene Hernandez-Feiks, Curator & Founder of WonderlandSF & Chillin Productions
2019	Aynur Girgin Westen	James Bacchi, Founding Partner of ArtHaus Gallery
2019	Tanya Herrera	Patience Yi, executive director of Code and Canvas
2019	Paul Madonna	Donna Seager, Founding Partner of Seager Gray Gallery
2019	Mike Sanchez	Dylan Ozanich. Founding Partner of Scale Up Art
2019	Sandra Yagi	Alan Bamberger, Art Consultant & Appraiser of ArtBusiness.com
2018	Tamara Avery	
2018	Cy de Groat	
2018	Camila Magrane	
2018	Lynn Rubenzer	
2018	Stevan Shapona	
2017	Ariel Gold	
2017	Jane B. Grimm	
2017	Michael Jang	
2017	William Rhodes	
2017	Cindy Shih	
2017	Beth Davila Waldman	
2017	Aynur Girgin Westin	
2016	Paul Madonna	
2016	Robert Sakovich	
2016	Amy Ahlstrom	
2016	Catherine Mackey	
2016	Ramiro Cairo	
2016	Liz Hickok	
2016	Katja Leibenath	
2015	Amy Ahlstrom	
2015	Kathy Aoki	
2015	Monica Denevan	
2015	Ivy Jacobsen	
2015	Nina Katz	
2015	Christine Meuris	
2015	Kim Smith	
2015	Maxine Solomon	
2015	Sandra Yagi	
