= Merle Woo =

American poet (born 1941)

- Born: October 24, 1941 (age 84); San Francisco, California, U.S.
- Occupations: Academic, poet, activist

Merle Woo is an lesbian socialist feminist Asian American academic, poet, and activist who has been described as "a leading member of the Radical Women and the Freedom Socialist Party". Her essay "Letter to Ma" was selected for inclusion in the 1981 feminist anthology This Bridge Called My Back.

== Early life and family ==
Woo was born in San Francisco, California on October 24, 1941 to a Chinese father and a Korean mother, Richard and Helene Woo. Woo attended Catholic schools, as her parents believed them to be better than public schools.

While in college Woo met and married her husband, with whom she had two children. In 1973, after multiple attempts to leave the abusive relationship, she was able to do so. They divorced in the mid-1970s.

== Education ==
In 1965, Woo received a B.A. in English from San Francisco State University. In 1969, Woo received a M.A. in English literature also from San Francisco State University. It was while she was studying for her M.A. that Woo witnessed the 1968–69 Third World Student Strikes at the University, which had a huge impact on her becoming an activist. Woo also believes that these strikes had a positive impact on her ability to later find work.

== Career ==
After completing her degree in 1969 Woo began working at San Francisco State University with their Equal Opportunity Program, where she taught Lesbian Literature, among other classes. Working with students of color, she also tried to make English learning more relevant and added non-English literature into her work. In 1978 she started working as a full-time lecturer at the University of California, Berkeley in ethnic/Asian American Studies. She was fired in 1982 due to her sexuality, race, politics, support of student protests, and openly criticizing the way the Ethnic Studies Department was run and its increasing conservatism. She fought against the dismissal and was briefly reinstated in 1984 after she and her partner, Karen Brodine, formed the Merle Woo Defense Committee to ensure that all issues would be heard.

In 1986 Berkeley declined to renew Woo's teaching contract, a move she believed to be discrimination and retaliation. Woo once again successfully fought against the dismissal, winning a union arbitration against the university in 1989. In 1991 Woo accepted settlement from the university in lieu of reinstatement after her breast cancer diagnosis. She went on to teach at California State University Hayward, San Francisco State University, and San Jose State University.

In the late 1970s, Woo formed political art performance group Unbound Feet with Nellie Wong, Kitty Tsui, Genny Lim, Canyon Sam, and Nancy Hom. Their performances focused on sexism and racism, and sought to challenge stereotypes of Chinese women. The group dispersed in 1981 due to disputes within the group regarding Berkeley's treatment of Woo and Woo's response.

In 1977, Woo performed in Lonny Kaneko's play Lady is Dying. Woo has also published a play, Home Movies: A Dramatic Monologue, which has been described as an "outcry against both sexism and racism".

Woo's essay "Letter to Ma" was published in the 1981 anthology This Bridge Called My Back: Writings by Radical Women of Color. In this work she tries to explain her life choices and sexuality to her mother, attempting to highlight their shared experiences by comparing their lives. She also reflects on her experiences as an Asian American and finding strength in that identity.

Merle Woo's papers are collected in the archives of the Schlesinger Library on the History of Women in America, Harvard Radcliffe Institute.

== Identity ==
Around 1979, Woo came out as a lesbian. She is one of the first few Asian American lesbian poets to write unequivocally about lesbian sexuality, including her poem "Untitled" in which she writes about lesbian sex and oral pleasure.

Woo identifies as a socialist feminist, Asian American lesbian educator and writer, unionist, and cancer survivor. She is a leader in the Freedom Socialist Party and Radical Women. She advocates for a multi-issue coalition of the oppressed and frequently appears at organized events or parades for the oppressed.

In 1991 amidst Woo's battle against Berkeley's administration, she was diagnosed with breast cancer. In 2004 she was diagnosed with thyroid cancer, which she also survived. Woo identifies as a cancer survivor.

== Bibliography ==
- Yellow Woman Speaks: Selected Poems (1986, Radical Women Publications)
- "Our Common Enemy, Our Common Cause: Freedom Organizing in the Eighties" (1986, in Freedom Organizing Series #2, Kitchen Table: Women of Color Press)
- Three Asian American Women Speak Out on Feminism (1993, Radical Women Publications)
- "Forging the Future, Remembering Our Roots: Building Multicultural, Feminist Lesbian and Gay Studies" (1994, in Tilting the Tower: lesbians, teaching, queer subjects.)
- "Three Decades of Class Struggle on Campus: A Personal History" (2000, in Legacy to Liberation: Politics and Culture of Revolutionary Asian Pacific America)
