= Bernice Bing =

American artist (1936–1998)

- Born: Bernice Lee Bing; 10 April 1936; San Francisco, California, U.S.
- Died: 18 August 1998 (aged 62); Philo, California, U.S.
- Education: California College of Arts and Crafts, California School of Fine Arts (BFA, MFA)
- Known for: Oil painting
- Movement: Abstractionism
- Awards: Asian Heritage Council award (1990); National Women's Caucus for Art Lifetime Achievement Award (first Asian-American to receive award) (1996)

Bernice Bing (10 April 1936 – 18 August 1998) was a Chinese American lesbian artist involved in the San Francisco Bay Area art scene in the 1960s. She was known for her interest in the Beats and Zen Buddhism, and for the "calligraphy-inspired abstraction" in her paintings, which she adopted after studying with Saburo Hasegawa.

Bing was a co-founder of San Francisco’s SCRAP, according to the 2013 film about her life and an article in the SF City College Guardsman.

== Early life ==
Bernice Lee Bing, given the nickname "Bingo" as a child, was born in Chinatown, San Francisco, California, in 1936. Bing's father was an immigrant from Southern China, while her mother was born in the United States.

Bing's father was incarcerated before she was three years old, and her mother, who was at times physically abusive, died due to a heart ailment before she was six, leaving Bing with limited exposure to her traditional Chinese heritage. Raised in numerous Caucasian foster homes with her sister, Bing also lived in the Ming Quong Home, a girls' custodial home in Oakland's Chinatown, for some time. Bing occasionally stayed in Oakland with her grandmother, whose praises fostered Bing's interest in art. As a rebellious child who did not do well academically, Bing turned to drawing, which she said "kept [her] connected."

Bing was involved in the arts throughout high school, winning several local and regional art contests. After graduating from Oakland Technical High School in 1955, she received a National Scholastic Award to the California College of Arts and Crafts (CCAC) initially as an advertising major, then later as a painting one. She attended school with fellow abstract expressionist painter George Miyasaki and sculptor Manuel Neri. During her time there, Bing was instructed by Nathan Oliveira (1928–2010), Richard Diebenkorn (1922–1993), and Saburo Hasegawa (1906–1957), who especially made an impact on Bing. A Japanese-born painter, Hasegawa introduced Bing to Zen Buddhism, Chinese philosophers, including Lao Tzu and Po Chu-i, and traditional calligraphy. Her encounter with Hasegawa also incited her to start thinking of her identity as an Asian woman.

In 1958, after one semester in CCAC, Bing transferred to the California School of Fine Arts (now known as the San Francisco Art Institute). There, she studied with Elmer Bischoff and Frank Lobdell and eventually earned a B.F.A. with honors in 1959 followed by an M.F.A. in 1961. To support herself as a student, Bing waitressed and maintained a studio in North Beach above the Old Spaghetti Factory, a popular artist hangout.

By the late 1950s and early 1960s, the Bay Area art scene had become lively, and Bing was close to many of those artists. Her wider circle of friends, many of which were prominent Bay Area abstract painters, included Joan Brown, Wally Hedrick, Jay DeFeo, Bruce Conner and Fred Martin. The art, literature, theater, and film of the beat generation movement were a major influence on her.

== Early career ==
Most of her early work is destroyed, stolen, or lost. A common theme in her early work was exploration of her own identity, particularly as an Asian woman, in contrast to dominant ideas of "normalcy."

Following college, Bing became involved in the San Francisco Bay Area art scene.

In 1960, while accompanying Joan Brown to New York for the latter’s one-person show at Staempfli Gallery, she met Marcel Duchamp, an extraordinary experience for her.

In 1961, San Francisco’s Batman Gallery, an alternative Beat space with all black walls and located at 2222 Fillmore (named by poet Michael McClure and painter Bruce Conner), mounted her one-person exhibition Paintings & Drawings by Bernice Bing, which garnered praise from critics like Alfred Frankenstein from the San Francisco Chronicle. She also showed large-scale works, including her painting Las Meninas (1960) based on Diego Velázquez's Baroque court scene, also entitled Las Meninas (1656).

James Monte critically reviewed her shows in Artforum in 1963 and 1964. She moved to Mayacamas Vineyards, Napa Valley in 1963 for a three-year period but returned to Berkeley for her two-person exhibition at Berkeley Gallery.

In 1967, she took part in the first residential program of Esalen Institute, New Age Psychology and Philosophy at Big Sur, where she continued her interest in William Blake and Carl Jung’s symbolism; attended workshops by Joseph Campbell, Alan Watts, Fritz Perls, and Abraham Maslow; and read Fritjof Capra’s 1975 book, Tao of Physics. From 1984 to 85, Bing traveled to Korea, Japan and China, studying traditional Chinese ink landscape painting at the Zhejiang Art Academy in Haungzhou.

In addition to art, Bing was an educator, including at the California College of Arts and Crafts (her alma mater), an activist, and arts administrator. She involved herself in many programs and organizations, like the National Endowment for the Arts Expansion program (1968), the Neighborhood Arts Program (1969–71), and the San Francisco Art Festival at the San Francisco Civic Center (early 1970s). She was an artist under the Comprehensive Employment and Training Act (CETA), which funded 20,000 arts sector jobs nationwide. In 1975, Bing and two other artists, working under the Neighborhood Arts Program and CETA, established the Scrounger Center for Reusable Art Parts (SCRAP). In 1977, Bing created an art workshop with the Baby Wah Chings, a Chinatown gang, after the Golden Dragon Massacre in San Francisco.

Bing also served as the first executive director of the South of Market Cultural Center (now known as SOMArts) from 1980 to 1984, expanding the programming during her time there. Her work in the community was recognized by awards in 1983 and 1984.

== Traveling to Asia ==
Bing visited Korea, Japan, and China from 1984 to 1985. There, she presented lectures on Abstract Expressionism to art students. Bing spent six weeks studying Chinese calligraphy with Wang Dong Ling and Chinese landscape painting with Professor Yang at the Zhejiang Art Academy in Hangzhou, China. She was profoundly impacted by the experience, struck by the “vastness of the country” as well as the architecture, in particular the Imperial Courts and Summer Palace.

== Later career and final years ==
After returning from her travels in 1985, Bing moved from San Francisco to Philo, a hamlet in Mendocino County, California. She initially worked as a waitress and cook in order to support herself. In 1989, Bing's career was revitalized after meeting Moira Roth, a professor of art history at Mills College who suggested that Bing join the Asian American Women Artists Association (AAWAA). Bing's participation in the AAWAA helped her to incorporate her interest with identity into her art.

Bing was selected by the National Women Caucus for the Arts Visual Arts Honor Award in 1996, in partnership with a group exhibition at the Rose Museum at Brandeis University in Waltham, Massachusetts.

She died in Philo in 1998 from cancer.

== Lesbian and women's groups ==
Bing was closeted as a lesbian in her Chinese community, and she avoided identification with labels such as "lesbian" or "feminist." However, she was active in several lesbian and women's groups, such as Lesbian Visual Artists, Rural Women's Resources, and Asian American Women's Artists Association.

== Art and influence ==
In her art’s bridge between East and West, Bing cited an early exposure to existential philosophy that led to her pursuit of abstraction, combined with a broad array of artistic, literary, film and musical influences characteristic of the postwar fifties: from Willem de Kooning, Franz Kline and Robert Motherwell, Albert Camus and Simone de Beauvoir, to Ingmar Bergman and Federico Fellini. Like many postwar abstractionists, she recognized the prominence of Zen Buddhism and followed author Daisetsu Teitaro Suzuki, Zen’s Western authority. In her later years she devoted her practice to Nichiren Buddhism, a branch of Buddhism based on the teachings of the 13th-century Japanese monk Nichiren (1222–1282).

Her work Mayacamas, No. 6, March 12, 1963 (1963) is held by the Fine Arts Museum of San Francisco. It was inspired by the Mayacamas Mountains of Northern California. The Crocker Art Museum in Sacramento, California has a promised gift by Bing, a large oil-on-canvas titled Velázquez Family (1961).

In 2013, the documentary film The Worlds of Bernice Bing was co-produced by the Asian American Women Artists Association and Queer Women of Color Media Arts Project. It was produced and directed by Madeleine Lim and co-produced by Jennifer Banta Yoshida and T. Kebo Drew. In 2022–23, the Asian Art Museum hosted a show of her work.

In 2016 her biography was included in the exhibition catalogue Women of Abstract Expressionism organized by the Denver Art Museum. In 2023 her work was included in the exhibition Action, Gesture, Paint: Women Artists and Global Abstraction 1940-1970 at the Whitechapel Gallery in London. In 2024, Bing's work appeared in Bernice Bing: BINGO at Berry Campbell Gallery, which was her first solo show in New York.

Despite never reaching financial stability or fame during her lifetime, her work is considered as foundational to the development of Asian American painting.
