= Kearny Street Workshop =

Asian art organization in San Francisco

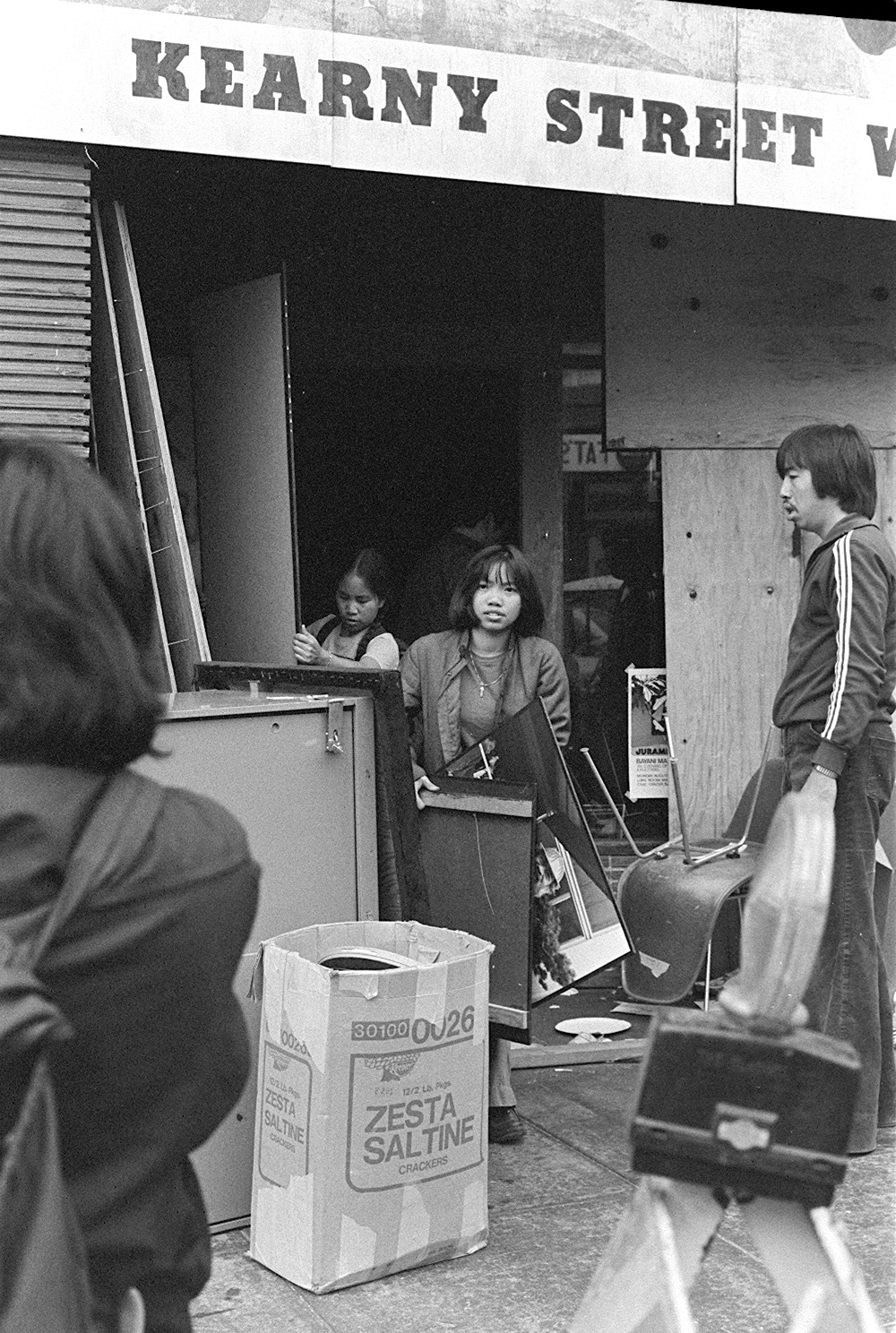
Silkscreen artist and former executive director Nancy Hom takes artwork out of the International Hotel a day after the hotel's tenants were evicted

Kearny Street Workshop (KSW) in San Francisco, California, is the oldest multidisciplinary arts nonprofit addressing Asian Pacific American issues. The organization's mission is to produce and present art that enriches and empowers Asian Pacific American communities. Notable participants include author and Asian American studies scholar Russell Leong, playwright and author Jessica Hagedorn, author Janice Mirikitani, poet and historian Al Robles, and actor and filmmaker Lane Nishikawa.

== History ==
=== Origins ===
Kearny Street Workshop was founded as an artists' collective in 1972 in the International Hotel (I-Hotel) on San Francisco's Kearny Street. The founders Jim Dong, Lora Joh Foo, and Mike Chin and other early leaders were involved in the Asian American movement, a Civil Rights Movement-inspired period of organizational and community building in the 1970s. The National Endowment for the Arts provided some initial funding through the Neighborhood Arts Program (NAP), an initiative of the San Francisco Arts Commission. Though the founders were initially distrustful of government funds, NAP liaison Bernice Bing and founder Jim Dong eventually agreed to use a $2,000 NAP grant to fund a graphics workshop for KSW participants.

In its early days, KSW shared space with a dry goods store on the ground floor of the I-Hotel. The organization originally focused on cultivating Chinese American arts and activism. However, the organization quickly expanded to cater to a multiethnic constituency, holding classes for Asian American activists and artists to practice photography, creative writing, and silkscreen printing. Within the first few years, hundreds of Bay-area students were attending classes, salons, workshops, and exhibitions each day. KSW also opened Jackson Street Gallery in an adjacent I-Hotel storefront space in 1974, where Workshop members held exhibitions, poetry readings, and musical performances.

Crystal K.D. Huie was one of the early artists at Kearny Street Workshop.

=== Community activism ===
KSW played a key role in developing Asian American activist iconography during the I-Hotel anti-eviction movement. Students and other KSW members painted a block-long mural on the Jackson Street side of the I-Hotel in support of its tenants. Screenprinted posters advocating for the I-Hotel tenants' rights appeared throughout San Francisco's Chinatown, Manilatown, and Japantown during the decade-long fight for the I-Hotel. Artists from KSW also aided in the anti-eviction protests by organizing rallies, attending court hearings, hosting exhibitions on affordable housing, and publishing poetry and pamphlets that depicted life in the I-Hotel.

KSW also provided summer youth programming that was intended to provide a diversion from gang violence in Chinatown. Workshop members also spearheaded the development of the annual Hop Jok Fair, which not only promoted Asian American artwork, but introduced many low-income Chinatown residents to available social and health services.

=== Eviction and relocation ===
In 1977, both residential and business tenants were evicted from the I-Hotel. The workshop's headquarters relocated to a small storefront in North Beach, San Francisco. However, this relocation separated the organization from its key communities and constituents in Chinatown and Manilatown.

KSW was able to return to Chinatown by 1981, leasing a basement space in a hotel on Clay Street. During its time in this space, members organized the Asian American Jazz Festival as well as the Kearny Street Workshop Press.

In 1995, Nancy Hom became the executive director, the organization had the first-ever board of directors added, and as a result KSW was incorporated as a 501(c)(3) nonprofit organization and relocated to South Park, San Francisco.

Since 2010, Arc Studios and Gallery with an art gallery, office, ten studios, and Cafe Suspiro Coffee Shop, also has the Kearny Street Workshop office, the San Francisco Artist Network office, at 1246 Folsom Street, between 8th & 9th streets in South of Market, San Francisco.

== Programs and exhibitions ==
KSW's past and present programs include a small poetry press, writers' workshops, visual arts, martial arts, readings, music, gallery exhibitions, performances, and film screenings, as well as the Asian American Jazz Festival and the annual artists festival APAture.

=== Kearny Street Workshop Press ===
KSW's press published poetry by Bay-area Asian American authors such as Virginia Cerenio, Bob Hsiang, Jaime Jacinto, Genny Lim, Lenny Limjoco, and Jeff Tagami.

=== Asian American Jazz Festival ===
KSW founded the Asian American Jazz Festival (AAJF) in 1981, with the help of organizers and KSW members George Leong and Paul Yamazaki. Until it ceased production in 2006, the AAJF was the longest continuously-running jazz festival in the San Francisco area. Notable participants include Mark Izu, Fred Ho, Vijay Iyer, and Jin Hi Kim.

=== APAture ===
APAture is an annual multidisciplinary arts festival founded in 1999. Its mission is to promote emerging Bay-Area-based artists of Asian and/or Pacific Islander descent. Notable participants include Gene Luen Yang, Ali Wong, Hasan Minhaj, Jane Kim, and Goh Nakamura.
