= When I Was Growing Up =

When I Was Growing Up is an autobiographical poem written by revolutionary feminist activist Nellie Wong in 1973, describing her struggle to identify as an Asian-American girl growing up in the United States. Wong reflects on the universal representations of Western ideals of beauty advertised in American popular culture; from which, Wong expresses her desire to be white, to be normal. She states "...to become/a woman, a desirable woman, I began to wear/imaginary pale skin." The lack of and negative stereotypical representations of Asian-American women in Western popular culture denied Nellie Wong the agency to privilege her intersectional identity. The result of this patriarchal tool made Wong shameful of her Chinese heritage: "when I was growing up, I felt/dirty. I thought that god/made white people clean/and no matter how much I bathed/I could not change, I could not shed/my skin in the gray water."

Nellie Wong's piece identifies the invisibilization of racial issues in the second-wave feminist movement. Her work, particularly this piece, is often cited in the works of feminists or advocates of feminisms with intersectional frameworks like This Bridge Called My Back. Although some argue that we live in a post-feminist society, that women have achieved equality, today this poem still speaks great volumes regarding the ways in which hegemonic femininity is still perceived and the tokenism people of various racial, sexual, religious, class, socio-economic status are portrayed as in Western popular culture and media.

The last section of the poem,

"I know now that once I longed to be white.
How many more ways? you ask.
Haven't I told you enough?"

has its last line indicated in the Columbia Granger's Index to Poetry in Anthologies.

The poem has been frequently anthologized in educational curricula.
