= Cindy Shih =

Taiwanese-American artist

- Born: 1982 (age 43–44); Taiwan
- Other name: Cindy Shih López
- Education: City College of San Francisco, Technische Universität Berlin; University of California, Los Angeles
- Known for: Painting

Cindy Shih (born 1982) is a Taiwanese-born American visual artist. Her work is strongly rooted in traditional techniques and principles, including Chinese literati painting, Venetian plasterwork, landscape painting, and realism, although producing thoroughly modern pieces. One of her prominent themes is exploring her personal narrative in a broad context. She lives in San Francisco, California.

== Early life ==
Shih was born in Taiwan and immigrated to Los Angeles at the age of three. She describes her family as a "model immigrant Chinese family" who encouraged her to be independent and free-thinking, but also wanted for her the usual hallmarks of traditional success, such as marriage and assimilation.

She holds a BA degree in Communication Studies from the University of California, Los Angeles (UCLA). She also received art training to the Art Department of the City College of San Francisco; and also studied fine arts and film at the Technische Universität Berlin in Berlin Germany, and painting and creative advertising at the ArtCenter College of Design in Pasadena.

== Career ==
In 2012, she gave up a job at Google to pursue painting. Her artwork has been described as feminist work that addresses issues of gender, race, and power.

Her studio is located in the Pacific Felt Factory, a warehouse space that allowed her to expand the size of her works. She was interviewed after the Ghost Ship art community which was destroyed by an Oakland area fire.

She has collaborated with companies to incorporate her art into their products in unique ways, including Savoir-Faire in Novato, California, a fine artist supplies importer.

== Awards and honors ==
- 2018 Print Installation at San Francisco Airport Marriott Waterfront, Burlingame, CA 2017 SF Open Studios Juror's Choice Award, SOMArts Main Gallery, San Francisco, CA
- 2x2 Solo Show Nominee 2016, Pro Arts Gallery, Oakland, CA
- 2015 Top Ten ArtSpan Open Studios Artist, Juror's Choice, SOMArts Main Gallery, San Francisco, CA
- Best in Show (Mixed Media), deYoung Museum, San Francisco, CA
- Expressions of Excellence, Sacramento Fine Arts Center, Carmichael, CA

== See also ==
- Taiwanese art
