= Benjamen Chinn =

American photographer (1921–2009)

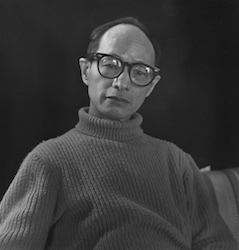
- Imogen Cunningham's 1973 portrait of Benjamen Chinn
- Born: April 30, 1921; San Francisco, California
- Died: April 25, 2009 (aged 87); San Francisco, California
- Education: California School of Fine Arts
- Known for: Photography
- Relatives: Lenore Chinn (niece)

Benjamen Chinn (April 30, 1921 – April 25, 2009) was an American photographer, known especially for his black and white images of Chinatown, San Francisco and of Paris, France in the late 1940s and early 1950s.

== Early life and education ==
Born in San Francisco's Chinatown on April 30, 1921, Benjamen Chinn was the ninth of twelve children. He was introduced to photography at the age of ten by his older brother, John, who taught him how to develop and print photos. Together the two assembled a darkroom in the basement of the family home. Throughout his photographic career, Chinn, an engineer by profession, would become known for his skills in the darkroom.

During World War II, he served in the Pacific as an aerial and public relations photographer for the United States Army Air Corps. Based at Hickam Field in Hawaii, he and a lone pilot flew reconnaissance missions in bombers that had been converted into unarmed camera planes.

After the war, Chinn returned to San Francisco and was accepted into a new fine art photography program at the California School of Fine Arts (CSFA), (now the San Francisco Art Institute). In this program, Ansel Adams and Minor White groomed the next generation of fine art photographers in the so-called "West Coast school of photography." Lecturers included Edward Weston, Imogen Cunningham, Lisette Model and Dorothea Lange. "The climax of every year was the five day, early spring trip to visit Edward Weston and to photograph at Point Lobos State Reserve, which his pictures had made famous. Full time concern with photography was nothing new to us, but on this trip the intensity rose like a thermometer held over a match flame." The close-knit circle of teachers and students would become lifelong friends. Chinn was particularly close to Cunningham, and through the end of her life he would often bring dim sum to her house for their lunches together.

During this time Chinn began photographing San Francisco's Chinatown. His images exhibit a non-judgmental eye and a natural curiosity about people. He made intimate portraits of everyday life in the post-war era. His photos display an intuitive sense of form and movement and he credited his development to his CSFA painting instructors Dorr Bothwell and Richard Diebenkorn. The photos, many of which were taken from his doorstep, create a unique portrait of Chinatown from an insider's point of view.

Chinn went on to Europe and photographed Parisian street life from 1950 to 1951 while studying sculpture from Alberto Giacometti at the Académie Julian. He also took painting classes at Fernand Léger's school, and geography and philosophy at the Sorbonne. He became friends with Léger and Henri Cartier-Bresson. Living in Paris, without a darkroom for the first time, he developed the negatives of the photos he took, but did not print or see any of the images until after he returned to San Francisco.

== Career ==
In 1954, Minor White exhibited some of Chinn's Paris photos at a show titled Perceptions at the San Francisco Museum of Art (now the San Francisco Museum of Modern Art). White used one of them for the cover of the second edition of Aperture magazine. At this time, Chinn assisted Wayne Miller and Dorothea Lange as part of the West Coast Selection Committee for Edward Steichen's Family of Man exhibition.

In 1953, Chinn went to work for the Sixth United States Army Photo Lab in the Presidio of San Francisco. He met Paul Caponigro, then a 20 year-old enlisted man doing his military service at the lab. Initially attracted by their mutual interest in classical music, Ben volunteered to train Caponigro in the technical aspects of negative and print making. Caponigro would go on to become a substantial landscape art photographer. Additionally, he introduced Caponigro to his teachers, now friends, from the CSFA: Adams, White, Lange and Cunningham. Caponigro writes, "Through Ben, I felt that I had been admitted into a 'guild' of serious image makers using light and silver emulsions. Ben's own talent and ability with the camera coupled with his willingness to reach out to another human being gave me a great start and the inspiration to extend myself to those searching to develop within the realm of great art."

Chinn had a thirty-one year career at the army photo lab where he rose to Chief of Photographic Services and later, Chief of Training Aids & Services Division. Though he stopped pursuing photography as a fine art, his life and relationships as a photographer never ceased. He continued to travel with his camera, photographing the Tarahumara Indians in Copper Canyon, Mexico, and the indigenous peoples of Teotitlán.

Throughout his life, Chinn developed and maintained numerous lifelong friendships. He actively participated in social groups that shared his beliefs in religion, the arts, travel and the enjoyment of food and good company – spending hours discussing classical music, films and the books of the day. He continued to photograph with a 35mm camera and shared his artistry through holiday cards and documentary photography support for Project Concern International.

Even after retiring, Chinn's passion for photography continued, as he volunteered at a one-hour photo store in Chinatown developing people's photos.

== Death and legacy ==
Chinn lived in the family house in Chinatown until February, 2008, when he was moved to an assisted-living facility. He died at age 87 on April 25, 2009, at Kaiser Permanente Hospital in San Francisco, California.

Chinn's work evidenced the influence of the world of black and white art photography in the United States, during the 1940s and 1950s. His work also became influential for many new and already esteemed artists. While his work has had a number of exhibitions (see below), it has largely lain unrecognized until the turn of the 21st century. In more than one of his publications, noted landscape photographer Paul Caponigro has acknowledged the influence that studying with Chinn had on him.

Author Alexandra Chang wrote, "His work, varying from still life, to the architecture of San Francisco Chinatown, to portraits, exudes an Atget-like quality of a moment from everyday life frozen in time."

Since his death, a process has been developed to archive Chinn's entire photographic work and digitize it for analysis by artists and scholars. His former home has a historical marker on Commercial Street, near Kearny Street.

His niece Lenore Chinn is also an artist, known for her paintings.

== Solo exhibitions ==
- De Anza College Gallery (1965; now Euphrat Museum of Art), De Anza College, Cupertino, California
- Benjamen Chinn at Home in San Francisco (2003), Chinese Historical Society of America, San Francisco, California
- Benjamen Chinn: Photographs of Paris: 1949–1950 (2005–2006), Scott Nichols Gallery, San Francisco, California
- Benjamen Chinn: Paris 1950–1951 (2011) SFO Museum, Terminal 3/Gate 76, San Francisco International Airport
- Benjamen Chinn's Paris: 1950–1951 (2011), Smith Andersen North Gallery, San Anselmo, California

== Group exhibitions ==
- Mendocino (1948), San Francisco Museum of Art (now San Francisco Museum of Modern Art), San Francisco, California
- Perceptions (1954) San Francisco Museum of Art, San Francisco, California
- Richard Elkus and Benjamen Chinn (1965), Hall Art Gallery at Mt. Angel College, Mt. Angel, Oregon
- San Francisco Arts Festival (1960s, four consecutive years), San Francisco, California
- California School of Fine Arts 125th Anniversary Exhibit (1972), Focus Gallery, San Francisco, California
- Alumni Exhibition: San Francisco Art Institute, Anniversary Exhibition (1981), Focus Gallery, San Francisco, California
- San Francisco Art Institute: 50 Years of Photography (1998), Transamerica Pyramid Gallery, San Francisco, California
- Leading the Way: Asian American Artists of the Older Generation (2001), Gordon College, Wenham, Massachusetts
- The First Decade 1946–1956, Alumni Work From The San Francisco Art Institute (2006), Smith Anderson North Gallery, San Anselmo, California
- Perceptions: Bay Area Photography, 1945–1960 (2006), Los Angeles Valley College, Valley Glen, California
- Celebrating 60 Years of Photography at the San Francisco Art Institute (2006), San Francisco Art Institute, San Francisco, California
- Asian|American|Modern Art: Shifting Currents, 1900–1970, (2008), De Young Museum, San Francisco, California
- The Golden Decade: California School of Fine Arts Photography, 1945–1955 (2010), Smith Andersen North Gallery, San Anselmo, California
- The Golden Decade: Photography at the California School of Fine Arts, 1945–1955 (2014), Mumm Napa Winery, Rutherford, California
- Learning to Land: A Story of Crossing Paths and Intergenerational Histories (2023), Edge on the Square, 800 Grant Avenue, San Francisco, California

== Collections ==
- Art Institute of Chicago, Chicago, Illinois
- Cantor Arts Center at Stanford University, Stanford, California
- Center for Creative Photography at University of Arizona, Tucson, Arizona
- Chinese Historical Society of America, San Francisco, California
- Fine Arts Museums of San Francisco (FAMSF), San Francisco, California
- Hallmark Photographic Collection, Nelson-Atkins Museum of Art, Kansas City, Missouri
- San Francisco Museum of Modern Art (SFMoMA), San Francisco, California
- Smithsonian American Art Museum, Washington, D.C.

== Bibliography ==
- Aperture No. 2, 1952, Cover photo
- An American Century of Photography: From Dry Point to Digital, Vol.2, Keith Davis, Hallmark Photographic Collection, 1995
- Benjamen Chinn, CAAABS project interview, August 14, 1998. Transcript, Asian American Art Project, Stanford University
- Chinatown Losing Landmark, Anastasia Hendrix, San Francisco Chronicle, July 7, 2000
- Leading the Way: Asian American Artists of the Older Generation, Irene Poon, Gordon College, 2001
- Caponigro, Paul; Reed, Dennis; Poon, Irene (2003). Benjamen Chinn at Home in San Francisco (exhibition catalogue). Chinese Historical Society of America.
- Martine, Lord (January 31, 2003). "Focus: Chinatown". San Francisco Chronicle.
- Ten Photographers, 1946 – 54, The Legacy of Minor White: California School of Fine Arts, The Exhibition Perceptions, Deborah Klochko, 2004
- The Moment of Seeing, Minor White at the California School of Fine Arts, Stephanie Comer and Deborah Klochko, 2006
- San Francisco's Chinatown, Judy Yung and the Chinese Historical Society of America, Arcadia Publishing, 2006
- Asian American Art: A History, 1850–1970, Gordon Chang, Mark Dean Johnson and Paul Karlstrom, 2008
- Asian|American|Modern Art: Shifting Currents, 1900–1970, Daniell Cornell and Mark Dean Johnson, editors, 2008
