= William Rhodes (sculptor) =

America artist (born 1966)

William Rhodes III
- Born: 1966 (age 59–60); Baltimore, Maryland, US
- Education: University of Massachusetts Dartmouth; University of the Arts; Baltimore School for the Arts
- Occupations: Sculptor and mixed-media artist
- Known for: Sculpture, quilts, furniture, drawing, painting
- Awards: California Arts Council; San Francisco Arts Commission
- Website: williamrhodesart.com

William Rhodes, Woman in Labor. Carved wood, pencil, paint, thread on paper and neon glass, 48" x 26" x 6", 2025.

William C. Rhodes, III (born 1966) is a Baltimore-raised, San Francisco-based sculptor and mixed-media artist. His artistic production includes sculpture, assemblage, quilting, collage, painting and drawings, which draw upon African-American, African and folk traditions as well as his background in furniture design. Critics describe his art as committed to craft and meaning, collective memory, and the transmission of lived, often overlooked histories. His recurrent themes of familial relationships, community, resilience and spirituality are rooted in Black experience and humanist values. Juan Ramón López wrote, "Rhodes is a traveler whose work opens portals to the distant past … His carefully gathered layers of heritage are multigenerational memory montages assembled into altars of worship."

Rhodes has exhibited at the Berkeley Art Museum, Baltimore Museum of Art (BMA) and de Young Museum, as well as craft-oriented museums such as the Museum of Arts and Design (New York), Metal Museum and Lauren Rogers Museum of Art. His art is held in public collections including at the Crocker Art Museum, Smithsonian National Museum of African American History and Culture, Reginald F. Lewis Museum, and Casa de Africa Museum (Havana), among others.

== Life and career ==
Rhodes was born in Baltimore, Maryland, in 1966. During the eventful civil rights era between 1968 and 1978, his father, William C. Rhodes Jr., published The Black Times, a magazine showcasing the contributions of Black performers and activists; exposure to notable community and creative figures at the publication offices, including artist Joyce J. Scott, would inspire Rhodes's later work.

Rhodes attended the Baltimore School for the Arts, studying with the AfriCOBRA artist James Phillips. He completed degrees in furniture design at the University of the Arts in Philadelphia (BA, 1989) and University of Massachusetts Dartmouth (MA, 1994). He began his career producing traditional, natural wood furniture but turned to more expressive, personal works in the early 1990s. After studying abroad and returning to Baltimore in the late 1990s, he purchased and transformed an abandoned rowhouse into a living and exhibition space called Saint Paul Street Art & Design Gallery.

In 2008, Rhodes moved to San Francisco and became involved in community service in the Bayview-Hunters Point area, teaching art in public schools and intergenerational senior services programs. He co-founded 3.9 Art Collective in 2011, a group of Black art professionals, in response to the city's declining Black population.

Rhodes has had solo exhibitions at the Sanchez Art Center, the Africa Centre, London, Transmission Gallery (Oakland), African American Art and Culture Complex (San Francisco), and San Francisco Public Library, among other venues. He appeared in surveys including the 15th Havana Biennial (2024), "Ashe to Amen" (Museum of Biblical Art, 2013), "Power, Politics, and People" (BMA, 2000), and "Stop Asking" (1999, Museum of Arts and Design).

== Work and reception ==
William Rhodes, Womb to Tomb. Carved wood, paint, glass and copper foil, 84" x 48" x 12", 1993. Smithsonian Museum of African American History and Culture collection

Rhodes's key areas of focus have been art furniture beginning in the 1990s, mixed-media sculptural assemblages beginning in the 2000s, and his later quilts. He has also produced drawings and paintings, which he frequently integrates into the other bodies of work. Art writers link his work to artists of the African diaspora who use folk traditions and aesthetics to engage history and its ongoing effects, such as Betye Saar, Renee Stout, Joyce Scott and John Outterbridge.

=== Art furniture ===
Rhodes's furniture works blend craft, function and conceptual themes involving spiritual, mythical and universal human experiences. Incorporating painted and carved elements, mirrors, stones, gold leaf, glass and copper, they include reliquary-like boxes, folding screens, chairs, and shaped chests, cabinets, bookcases and vanities with tiny drawers and hidden compartments. The forms and iconography Rhodes employs reflect diverse cultural, folklore and historical contexts and eras, including such things as Egyptian sarcophagi.

In 2016, his figural folding screen, Womb to Tomb (1993), was acquired by the Smithsonian Museum of African American History and Culture. Nearly seven-feet-tall and made of carved wood, glass, paint and copper, the screen features small figures fitted into larger carvings, a blue and green centerpiece representing earth and water, and glass panels depicting the seasons; when folded into the larger figure, the elements create a symbol of both womb and tomb and evoke the cycles of life.

=== Sculptural assemblages ===
Rhodes's sculptures largely take the form of wall-mounted assemblages crafted from found objects and rough-hewn recycled materials, carved figures, neon words, red thread, paint and drawings. The sculptures draw upon the artist's box tradition exemplified by Joseph Cornell and Betye Saar and the altar-like, repurposed-object pieces of John Outterbridge. They employ loaded symbols, iconography and text expressing poignant or sardonic content (for instance, Gone Mother, 2017 or Woke, 2025) to convey stories of resilience and community, the legacies of Black culture and history, the value of generational experience and the psychic complexity of urban life. His imagery often consists of stark black-and-white graphite portraits based in personal experiences that he punctuates with thick red thread evoking blood, womb ties or the stitching of wounds.

In sculptures such as Onward Christian Soldiers (2018) and Mama (2019), for example, Rhodes invoked conflicting associations involving the cross—allusions to nurture and a KKK cross-burning he witnessed—using carved forms and images of a Black Baptist church deaconess and a robed white supremacist. Artist and author Kenyatta A.C. Hinkle commented: "Experiencing Rhodes's work is akin to visiting an herbalist's sacred apothecary. Within his highly curated altar spaces, one is looking at both the cure and the poison." The assemblage Women and Labor (2025) played on the dual meanings inherent in the title, juxtaposing a central image of two young Black women wearing welding helmets, the word "Mother", balls of red thread (one strand embroidered into the shape of a heart), and hand-carved, fertility-like mermaid figures flanking the box.

=== Quilts ===
William Rhodes, The Black Times (Nina Simone Quilt). Paint, ink and thread on fabric, 60" x 72" x .5", 2025.

Rhodes has employed quilting as a tactile, historically rich medium for storytelling and fostering community engagement in intergenerational and international projects. Curator Melorra Green called the work "a sacred an act [of] remembrance … to stitch together stories and bring forward portraits of people who deserve to be seen … a living archive." The quilts combine rectangular pieces of found fabric and personal images from Rhodes or collaborators—often period and contemporary portraits—to tell stories of known and everyday people rising to an historical moment.

His Black Times Quilt – 1971 Edition (Nina Simone) referenced his father's periodical, while the Hunters Point Shipyard Quilt (2024) featured images of Black shipyard workers who flocked to Bayview in the early 1940s (many fleeing the Jim Crow south) for jobs in aid of the war effort. It was part of the collaborative "Shipyard Quilts Project", which involved historian Stacey Carter and Bayview seniors who had a connection to the shipyard. Rhodes and Carter adapted the project to create a coloring book, Hard Hat Heroes (2025). Rhodes has led other community quilting projects in Key West, Egypt, Cuba, and in South Africa, the Nelson Mandela International Quilt Project. For his 2025 Africa Centre, London, exhibition, Rhodes collaborated with artist and Black Panther Party Minister of Culture Emory Douglas.

Rhodes's drawings sometimes serve a similar commemorative function as his quilts; his exhibition Unexpected Beauty in Baltimore (2007) featured 33 expressive crayon drawings of local musicians, some forgotten, on found napkins and ephemera from venues in the city.

== Collections and recognition ==
Rhodes's work is held in the collections of the Africa Centre, London, Casa de Africa Museum, Crocker Art Museum, Smithsonian National Museum of African American History and Culture, New Bedford Art Museum, Reginald F. Lewis Museum and San Francisco Arts Commission, among others.

He has received awards and grants from the California Arts Council, San Francisco Arts Commission, Alliance for California Traditional Arts, ArtSpan, Awesome Foundation, Center for Cultural Innovation, Southern Exposure, and Yerba Buena Center for the Arts.
