= Paul Madonna =

American artist and writer

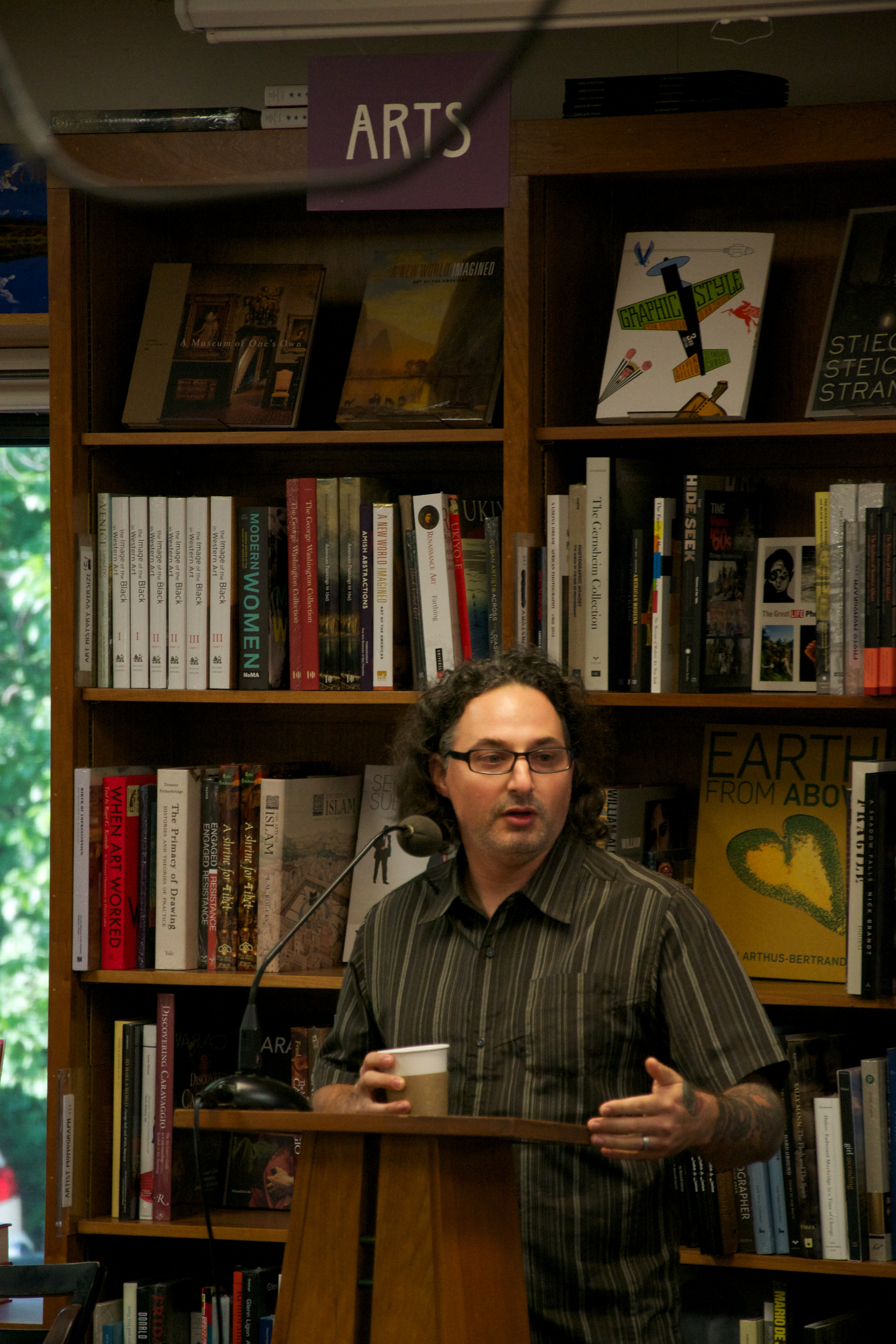
- Paul Madonna
- Born: 1972 (age 53–54); United States
- Education: Carnegie-Mellon University
- Known for: Drawings, novels, public art, murals
- Notable work: All Over Coffee, Small Potatoes, Emit Hopper
- Style: Plein air pen and ink drawing; mystery fiction
- Website: https://paulmadonna.com/

Paul Madonna (born 1972) is an American artist and author.

== Biography ==
Paul Madonna grew up in Pittsburgh, Pennsylvania. While still in high school he began attending art classes at Carnegie-Mellon University, where he went on to complete a B.F.A. in 1994. During his senior year of college, Madonna became the first art intern ever taken in by Mad magazine. Upon graduation, he moved to San Francisco and began making mini-comics, which he left in public places for free. In 2003, Madonna created "All Over Coffee", which was picked up by the San Francisco Chronicle in 2004. The series ran for twelve years, for a total of 726 strips, with the final strip running on December 27, 2015. Madonna has served as "cartoonist-in-residence" artist in residence at San Francisco's Cartoon Art Museum, and was the recipient of the Northern California Book Award's Recognition Award for Best Book of the Year, 2011, for his second book, Everything is its own reward. Madonna has gone on to do large-scale public art, and launch a series of mystery novels. His work is exhibited internationally in galleries and museums, and his books continue to sell around the world.

== Art and literary career ==
Madonna is an artist and author with a background in painting. He is best known for his series "All Over Coffee," which he called a 'strip,' a comic strip without the comic, which feature detailed ink-on-paper drawings of urban cityscapes paired with flash fiction stories. Madonna began all his drawings for the series on site, and straight to ink. He began with rendering his home town of San Francisco but has gone on to draw many U.S. cities including New York and Los Angeles, as well as international locations such as Paris, Rome, Amsterdam, Buenos Aires, Shanghai, Beijing, and Tokyo. "All Over Coffee" ran four days a week for a year and a half in the Daily and Sunday Datebook section of the San Francisco Chronicle, then six months at three days a week, finally settling into weekly publication for another ten years. In that time, City Lights Books published two collections, All Over Coffee (2007), and Everything is its own reward (2011). In 2015 Madonna ended the series with a story known as The Eviction Series, which is an absurdist short story about the tech boom in the San Francisco Bay Area. Shortly after, City Lights contracted The Eviction Series for a book, On to the Next Dream, which was released in 2017.

In 2016 Madonna released his first illustrated novel, Close Enough for the Angels, as a limited edition book at the Dryansky Gallery in San Francisco. The book features fictional artist Emit Hopper, 'a one-hit wonder, twice' who, after twenty years, is having a comeback, only to have his wife go missing while hiking in the Yosemite wilderness. It was Madonna's first foray into long form narrative and featured over 100 drawings of Japan, China, and Thailand. The book was intended to be a one-off book, but after a commercial edition was released in the fall of 2017, a second book was contracted. Come to Light was released in 2020 as the second Emit Hopper book. The three volume box set saw Emit scouring Europe in search of the man responsible for his wife's disappearance. The book features over 100 drawings of Portugal, Spain, France, Italy, and the Netherlands.

Come to Light introduced a new character, Ronnie Gilbert, a former ex-San Francisco Police officer turned private investigator. Before the release of Come to Light, a third Emit book was contracted for the origin story of Ronnie, titled The Commissions, featuring over 100 drawings of the San Francisco Bay Area, to be released in 2023.

On November 6, 2022, while finishing up The Commissions, Madonna was involved in a major life-threatening auto accident. Driving home from his studio, an out of control driver hit him head on going twice the speed limit in his lane. Madonna suffered multiple internal injuries, a brain bleed, a nicked carotid artery, lung collapse, and a shattered heel. News of his near-death accident prompted widespread sympathy from fans around the world.

As of spring 2023 Madonna continues his recovery and says he is working on a fourth Emit Hopper novel.

Madonna is also a prolific gallery artist, showing his original work internationally. His work has been shown in the Oakland Museum of California, the Contemporary Jewish Museum in San Francisco, and the William Blake Association in France.

In 2022 Madonna completed his first permanent public art project, a forty-foot permanent glass installation at the San Francisco International airport. The work was commissioned by the San Francisco Arts Commission.

In 2018 Madonna partnered with Bay Area historian Gary Kamiya, whose Cool Gray City of Love was a best-seller. Madonna was supposed to work on Cool Gray City but had to pass because of other commitments. Madonna had been producing the series Quotable City for the Nob Hill Gazette, then invited Kamiya to launch a new series Spirits of The Bay. In 2020 Bloomsbury produced a best-selling book based on the series, Spirits of San Francisco.

Madonna also produces the comic strip "Small Potatoes" for Universal syndication. In contrast to his detailed pen and ink drawings of All Over Coffee, the series uses deliberately rudimentary characters, drawn in a quick, loose hand.

== Works ==
- 2023 - The Commissions (Emit Hopper 3) (West Margin Press, 2023)
- 2022 - You Know Exactly (All Over Coffee 3) (West Margin Press, 2022)
- 2020 - Spirits of San Francisco (collaboration with Gary Kamiya) (Bloomsbury, 2020)
- 2020 - Come to Light (Emit Hopper 2) (West Margin Press, 2020)
- 2017 - Close Enough for the Angels (Emit Hopper 1) (Petty Curse Books, 2017)
- 2017 - On to the Next Dream (City Lights, 2017) ISBN 9780872867420
- 2011 - Everything is its own reward (All Over Coffee 2) (City Lights, 2011) ISBN 0-87286-515-0
- 2009 - Album 01 (2009, Electric Works / Paul Madonna Studio)
- 2007 - All Over Coffee (City Lights, 2007) ISBN 978-0-87286-456-6
- 2006 - A Writer's San Francisco: A Guided Journey for the Creative Soul by Eric Maisel, drawings by Paul Madonna (New World Library, 2006) ISBN 978-1-57731-546-9
