= Nancy Hom =

Chinese-born American artist (born 1949)

- 谭咏诗
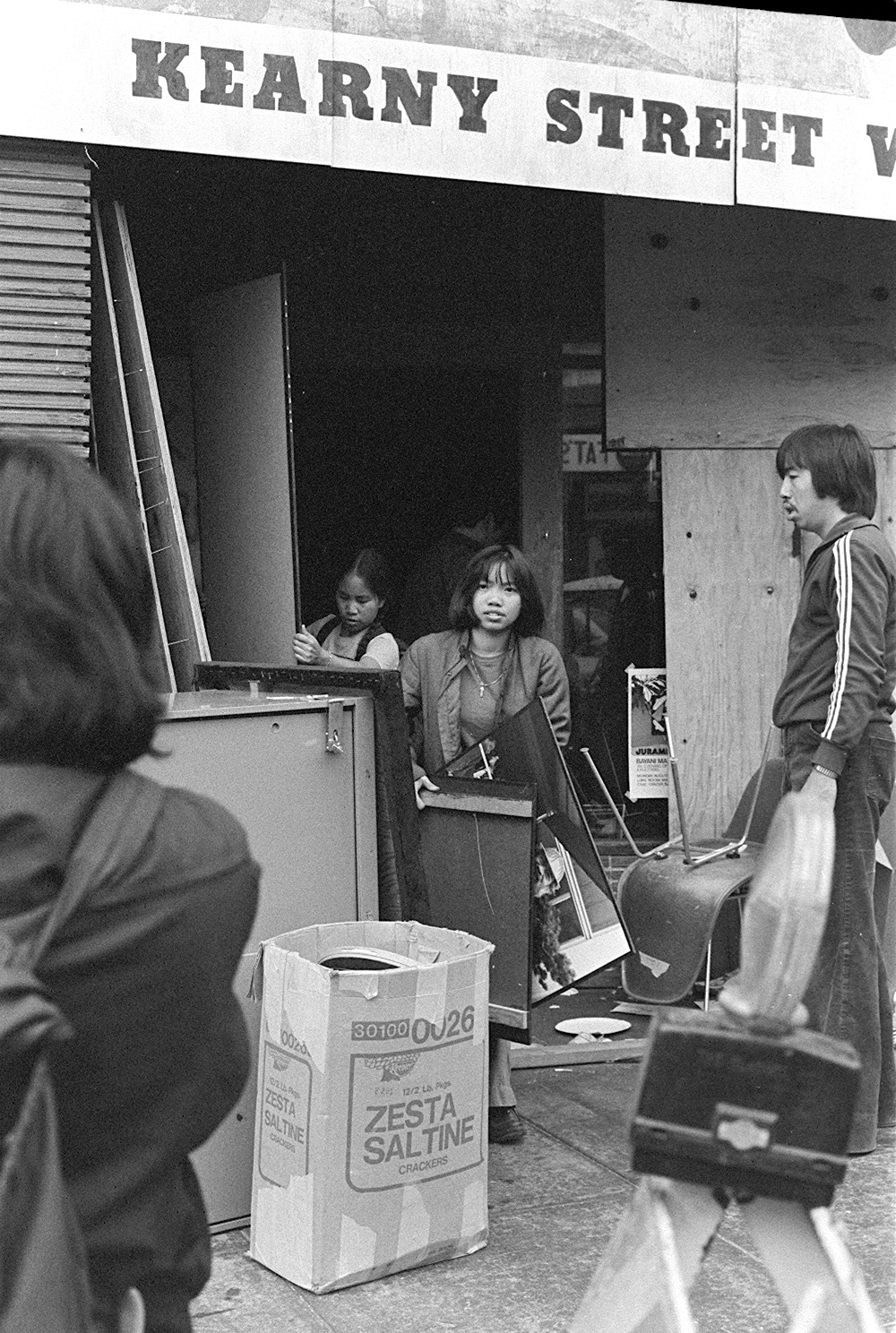
- Nancy Hom takes artwork out of the International Hotel in San Francisco, a day after the hotel's tenants were evicted
- Born: 1949 (age 75–76); Taishan, Guangdong, China
- Education: Pratt Institute (BFA)
- Occupation(s): Visual artist, illustrator, printmaker, curator, writer, arts administrator, social activist
- Spouse: Bob Hsiang
- Website: www.nancyhomarts.com

Nancy Hom (born 1949) is a Chinese-born American visual artist, illustrator, curator, writer, and arts administrator. She served as the executive director of Kearny Street Workshop for many years. Hom lives in San Francisco, California.

== Biography ==
Nancy Hom was born in 1949, in Taishan in Guangdong, China. She moved at the age of five to New York City, where she was raised. She graduated in 1971 with a BFA degree in illustration from Pratt Institute in Brooklyn. Hom moved to San Francisco in the 1974.

Much of her poster art is graphic and political. She has worked extensively within the Asian American movement. She is a member of the Asian American Women Artists Association (AAWAA).

Hom served as the executive director of Kearny Street Workshop in San Francisco, from 1995 to 2003. When she started her role Hom's was working with the first-ever board of directors for the organization, and at the time the Kearny Street Workshop was located on the ground floor of the I-Hotel. In December 1995, the organization was forced to move locations, and restructure the program into a nonprofit, which was led by Hom.

Her artwork is in museum collections, including at the Blanton Museum of Art in Austin, Texas; the Oakland Museum of California; the San Francisco Museum of Modern Art; and the Smithsonian American Art Museum in Washington, D.C..

== Publications ==
- Rohmer, Harriet; Hom, Nancy (1999). "My Father: Fook Tow Hom". Honoring Our Ancestors: Stories and Pictures by Fourteen Artists. Children's Book Press. pp. 17–. ISBN 978-0-89239-158-5.
- Rohmer, Harriet; Hom, Nancy (1997). Just Like Me: Stories and Self-portraits by Fourteen Artists. Children's Book Press. pp. 10–. ISBN 978-0-89239-149-3.
- Xiong, Blia (2013). Nine-In-One, Grr, Grr. Nancy Hom (illustrator). Children's Book Press. ISBN 9780892391103.
