= Ginger Wolfe-Suarez =

American artist and writer (b. 1980)

- Born: 1980 (age 44–45); Cranbury, New Jersey, US
- Education: University of California, Berkeley, School of the Art Institute of Chicago
- Known for: Installation art, sculpture, criticism
- Style: Feminist sculpture, contemporary sculpture, process-based art
- Website: www.gingerwolfesuarez.com

Ginger Wolfe-Suarez (born 1980) is an American artist, writer, and curator who has worked out of Los Angeles, the San Francisco Bay Area, and Atlanta. Her practice includes installation art, sculpture, drawings, and artist books. She has been featured in exhibitions in Paris, Berlin, Vienna, and throughout the United States, at venues including Silverman Gallery, Luckman Fine Arts Complex, Southern Exposure, Berkeley Art Museum and Pacific Film Archive (BAMPFA), Yerba Buena Center for the Arts, and High Desert Test Sites. Her work has been reviewed in Artforum, the Los Angeles Times, San Francisco Chronicle, Sculpture, Art Papers and Art Practical, among other publications. Wolfe-Suarez draws on the traditions of feminist sculpture, Latin American installation art, conceptualism, and minimalism in works that function phenomenologically to explore the perception of space and materials, body-object relationships, ephemerality, and negotiations of memory. Artforum reviewer Annie Buckley described her show at Ltd Los Angeles as one in which "the cerebral [was] incidental to the sensory," with subtle images, fleeting reflections and lingering scents indicating the intangible.

Ginger Wolfe-Suarez, Detail of Memory Objects. Dimensions variable; wood, water-based paint, light box with Fuji-transparency, and crushed mint leaves; 2010.

== Life and career ==
Wolfe-Suarez earned a BFA from the School of the Art Institute of Chicago (2002) and an MFA from the University of California, Berkeley (2009), where she was a recipient of the Eisner Award. In 2014, she received a residency at SOMA, in Mexico City. Between 2009 and 2012, she taught foundations and drawing, studio classes, art criticism, and art theory in the graduate program at San Francisco Art Institute, the University of California, Berkeley and Mills College. Wolfe-Suarez is married to the artist, Primitivo Suarez. They have collaborated on architectural objects and installations, and together co-founded The Critique Program with artist Robert Olsen in 2012. She also founded (2002) and co-edited the Los Angeles-based art publication InterReview Journal. Her writings on art have been published internationally in Art Papers, Sculpture, and MIT Press, among other publications. She lives with her husband and two children in Atlanta, Georgia.

== Work ==
Wolfe-Suarez's early sculptures and installations were made from commonplace materials and use feminist and minimalist vocabularies to explore the psychology and perception of space. Her first solo exhibition in Los Angeles, “Memory Objects” at ltd (2010), combined built and cast objects, mirror fragments, hand-built light boxes, string that was dipped in or coated with scented oils, and a pile of dried mint leaves that operated in concert to create an open-ended temporal and phenomenological viewer experience. The installation included components that had to be walked under and around. Reviewing her 2011 show, "Proximetric," critic Andrew Berardini wrote, “These works of art are not things to be perceived, but they are indivisible from the act of perception, the emotions and sensations they engender." Wolfe-Suarez's shows “Theory of a Family” (Silverman Gallery, San Francisco, 2010) and "Both Are True" (Southern Exposure, Los Angeles, 2011) made similar use of disparate objects, sound and scent in tenuous relationship to body, space and memory. Artist-critic Walter Robinson described the former show as "private, mysterious, intimate"; other reviewers compared her work's combination of spareness with symbolic, psychological, and narrative qualities to the work of Eva Hesse, Louise Bourgeois, Doris Salcedo and Lee Ufan.

Ginger Wolfe-Suarez, Breath of Work, handmade dye from ocean plants, shells, and salt-water on silk, 10" x 14", 2018.

In the installation "A Thing Repeated Is Not Always All The Same" (Diane Rosenstein, Los Angeles, 2015), Wolfe-Suarez combined basic materials—light, shadow, scent, wood, rocks, yarn, mirrors, walls—and repeated imagery in distinct works designed as an interrelated composition. For Color Fields, she created "walls" of stretched, hand-dyed yarn dipped in scented oils and strung at angles across corners or between walls and floors in an exploration of perceptual space, mood, and memory. Los Angeles Times critic Sharon Mizota described them as "breathing, architectural monochromes" whose "light, shadow, volume and reflection play off one another, dissolving expected notions of space and carving out new ones," similar to the effect of a sunbeam on a room. The show also featured a series of recurring images of transience (a bouquet, a sunset), mounted with different materials and arrangements that investigated the relationships between symbol, sentiment, experience and context.

In her most recent work, Wolfe-Suarez engages feminist and process-based traditions, using experimental materials such as wax, scents, and dyes extracted from ocean plants, saltwater and shells. The San Francisco Chronicle described a work in this vein, Breath of Work (2018), as "a landscape-like reverie" whose materials suggest an "alchemical element."

== Writing ==
Wolfe-Suarez's writings on art have been published internationally in Art Papers, Sculpture, Cement, N. paradoxa, Bridge, and InterReview, which she founded in 2002 and co-edited. In 2004, she conducted one of the few interviews with conceptual artist, Michael Asher, concerning his practice of institutional critique; it will be republished in an anthology on Asher's work by MIT Press (forthcoming). She has also published artist projects and interviews with contemporary artists, such as Sheila Levrant de Bretteville, Suzanne Lacy and Leslie Labowitz, Daniel Joseph Martinez, Dario Robleto, and Haim Steinbach.
