= Rose Museum =

Music museum in Manhattan, New York

Coordinates: 40°45′54.42″N 73°58′47.7″W

The Rose Museum is a small museum dedicated to the history of Carnegie Hall in Manhattan, New York City. The museum, which opened in 1991, is located at 154 West 57th Street, on the second floor of Carnegie Hall. It was funded by the Susan and Elihu Rose Foundation and includes more than 2,500 feet of archives and more than a century of concert programs. The plan when the museum opened was to supplement its permanent collection with a series of rotating exhibits. The museum also focuses on the Hall's uncertain future following the development of Lincoln Center and the sale of Carnegie Hall in the late 1950s leading to the preservation campaign spearheaded by Isaac Stern. The government purchased the hall in 1960 and the building was declared a National Historic Landmark in 1962.

== Collections ==
The museum's collection includes a number of items of interest to music lovers: a program from the Vienna Philharmonic's debut concert on March 28, 1842, an autographed program from the Beatles' shows, a ring owned by Beethoven, a pair of Johannes Brahms's eyeglasses, one of Richard Strauss's notebooks, which contained sketches of Danube, an unfinished poem as well as one of Benny Goodman's clarinets and batons used by Leonard Bernstein and Arturo Toscanini. It also includes a sequinned jacket owned and worn by Judy Garland and the trowel used in laying the cornerstone of Carnegie Hall.

Additional items from Carnegie Hall's history are held in the Carnegie Hall Archives, housed in a former studio. Those materials complement that in the museum's collection and are sometimes used for museum exhibitions.

=== Exhibits ===
The museum's exhibits have covered a wide range of the Hall's history. Among the people whose work the exhibits showcased are:

- Tchaikovsky, in honor of his trip to New York City for the opening of Carnegie Hall;
- Marian Anderson, the first African American to sing at the Metropolitan Opera;
- George and Ira Gershwin, in honor of the centennial of George's birth;
- Leonard Bernstein, among others.
- Andrew Carnegie, in honor of his centenary

== See also ==
- List of music museums
