= Lenore Chinn =

American artist (born 1949)

- Born: June 20, 1949 (age 77); San Francisco, California, U.S.
- Education: City College of San Francisco, San Francisco State College (BA)
- Occupations: Visual artist, activist
- Known for: Painting
- Relatives: Benjamen Chinn (uncle)
- Website: www.lenorechinn.com

Lenore Chinn (born June 20, 1949) is an American visual artist, known for her American realist paintings and her queer activism. Chinn was a founding member of Lesbians in the Visual Arts and Queer Cultural Center (QCC), and served on the San Francisco Human Rights Commission. She lives in San Francisco, California.

== Early life and education ==
Lenore Chinn was born on June 20, 1949, in San Francisco, California. She is a second generation Chinese-American. Her mother was raised in Oakland's Chinatown, while her father was raised in San Francisco's Chinatown. Her father was a mathematician and teacher, and her mother was a translator for the United States federal government. When Chinn was two years old, her family moved to the Richmond District of San Francisco. The Chinn family was one of the first Chinese-American families to move to the area dominated by white, middle-class neighbors. Because of their position as a minority in a primarily Caucasian area, the family taught Lenore and her younger brother about Chinese stereotypes. In an interview conducted by Rudy Lemcke in 2001, Chinn said, "I grew up with a family model, which offered simultaneously a traditional Chinese cultural framework of community and family, along with the opportunity to embrace non-traditional and non-Asian ideas. In short, my life's journey became a cross-pollination of other world views." These teachings would influence Chinn's artwork.

Chinn attended George Washington High School. She continued her studies at City College of San Francisco. In 1972, while on the Dean's list, she earned her Bachelor of Arts degree in Sociology from San Francisco State College (now San Francisco State University).

== Career ==
Chinn moved to the Castro District in the 1980s and became involved in activist groups, including the Harvey Milk Club. As the AIDS epidemic impacted her life, she started painting portraits of people in the district. Chinn co-founded the Lesbians in the Visual Arts and Queer Cultural Center (QCC). In 1991 Chinn joined the Asian American Women Artists Association (AAWAA), based in San Francisco. Her work often aims to fight cultural stereotypes by showcasing minorities and homosexuality.

Chinn speaks about her work and about lesbianism. She has spoken at the College Art Association, Women's Caucus for Art, and other organizations. Chinn is also a curator, working at galleries in San Francisco. She has exhibited her paintings at Pacific Union College and the National Arts Club.

== Exhibitions ==
=== Solo exhibitions ===
- Lenore Chinn: Realist Paintings (1985), UC Extension, 55 Laguna Street, San Francisco, California
- Lenore Chinn: Cultural Confluences (2012), Luggage Store Gallery, San Francisco, California

=== Group exhibitions ===
- Lenore Chinn and John Thomas Staple: Paintings and Sculpture (1980), Lucien Labaudt Art Gallery, 1407 Gough Street, San Francisco, California
- Out of the Bubble: Artists on Queer Travel (2008), Femina Potens, San Francisco, California; including artists Lenore Chinn, Dusty Lombardo, and Lydia Daniller
- LGBT Journey (2014), group exhibition, Commonwealth Club of California and the Queer Cultural Center, San Francisco, California; curated by Pamela Peniston and including artists Lenore Chinn, Rudy Lemcke, Bren Ahearn, Indira Allegra, and Preston Gannaway
