= Michael Jang =

American photographer

Michael Jang (born 1951) is an American documentary photographer. He is best known for his 1970s photographs of life in Los Angeles and San Francisco, with subjects ranging from his family to punk bands and street scenes.

== Early life and studies ==
Jang was born in Marysville, California in 1951. He studied at CalArts in Santa Clarita receiving a Bachelor of Fine Arts degree in 1973. Initially a design major, Jang switched to photography after being exposed to the work of Diane Arbus, Garry Winogrand, and Lee Friedlander. While at CalArts, Jang photographed the raunchiness of the student environment and in 2013 he published the photos in a book titled College. While at CalArts he used fake press credentials to access events and parties at The Beverly Hilton hotel, where he was able to photograph a range of people from the unknown to famous musicians and politicians.

Later in the 1970s, he moved to San Francisco and earned a MFA degree from the San Francisco Art Institute. While in grad school he photographed the San Francisco punk rock scene, including a portrait of Johnny Rotten after his last Sex Pistols performance.

== Work ==
After art school, Michael Jang continued to pursue creative projects while earning a living as a commercial photographer in San Francisco. He was relatively unknown as an artist until 2002, when the San Francisco Museum of Modern Art acquired several of his photographs. The subjects of his work are mainly vernacular photography and street photography. His 1973 series The Jangs documents the assimilation of his Asian American family. His 1983 series Summer Weather documented auditioning weather reporters.

In 2019 the McEvoy Foundation for the Arts staged a retrospective exhibition of his work. Also in 2019, Atelier Editions published a retrospective monograph of his work titled Who is Michael Jang?

== Publications ==
- Far East of Suburbia; Michael Jang, n.d; OCLC 993600565
- The Jangs; Michael Jang, 2009; OCLC 958691954
- One of a Kind; Los Angeles: Hamburger Eyes, 2011; OCLC 971973191
- Summer Weather; San Francisco: Owl & Tiger Books, 2012; ISBN 9780615596327
- College; San Francisco: Hamburger Eyes, 2013; Special edition, 2014. OCLC 880357874
- The Jangs × Los Angeles; Los Angeles: Pascale Georgiev and Kingston Trinder, 2014; OCLC 968799880
- To Mike; Los Angeles: Atelier, 2016; OCLC 1038534492
- Who is Michael Jang? Los Angeles: Atelier, 2019; ISBN 978-0997593594; With an introduction by Sandra S. Phillips, a foreword by Erik Kessels and texts by Kingston Trinder; Edition of 3000 copies

== Collections ==
Jang's work is in the collection of the San Francisco Museum of Modern Art and the National Gallery of Art in Washington, D.C.
