= Betty Nobue Kano =

Japanese artist (born 1944)

Betty Nobue Kano (born in 1944) is a Japanese painter, curator and lecturer at San Francisco State University and New College of California, teaching the 332 Japanese American Art and Literature class. She is notable for exhibiting her work in nearly 200 regional, national and international galleries and museums, including the Museum of Modern Art in San Francisco.

The paintings of Betty were distinguished by graffiti and handwriting submerged beneath layers of radiant, transparent color. In the late 1970s, she began to explore the interaction of more solid colour shapes. Some of her famous artworks are Women Artists of Color: A Bio-Critical Sourcebook to 20th Century Artists in the Americas; Black Velvet, the Art We Love to Hate; International Review of African American Art etc. One of the most famous artwork is Tomorrow's Garden (2009). The artwork is different from her previous artworks, as the painting - Tomorrow's Garden tried to stop using plastics.

She is the co-founder of Art Against Apartheid, Asian American Women Artists Association and Women of Color Camp. She received a Rockefeller Foundation Residency Fellowship in the Humanities and the "Sisters of Fire" Award by Women of Color Resource Center. She received her M.F.A. in Painting from UC Berkeley.

== Biography ==
Betty Nobue Kano was born in Sendai, Japan in 1944. She emigrated to the United States and got her B.A. degree in Fine Arts and Painting from San Francisco State College in 1967 and her Masters in Fine Arts from the University of California, Berkeley. She co-founded the Asian American Women Artists Association (AAWAA) in 1989 and is a lecturer at San Francisco State University.

Kano also involved in different community like Sansei Legacy Project which discuss the long-term impacts of the Japanese-American internment experience on sansei (third-generation American of Japanese descent). Moreover, she has several responsibilities and positions like advisory board in Japanese American National Library and Board of Directors of Japanese American Women Alumnae of UC Berkeley.

== Career ==
Apart from being an artist, Betty has involved in s sum of jobs related to her art life. The Education department of Oakland Museum of Art also hired her to be the consultant in the beginning of the 1990s. Starting from 1993, she taught lectures in the art department in some California universities, for example, the Laney College and San Francisco State University. Moreover, she has been the art curator for Roots in Asia, Public and Private Journey, The Mythmakers and so forth.

=== Education ===
- M.F.A. – Fine Arts, University of California, Berkeley, 1978
- M.A. – Fine Arts, University of California, Berkeley, 1977
- B.A. – Fine Arts: Painting, San Francisco State College, 1967

=== Administration and activism ===
Betty was deeply affected by the free speech movement in 1964. The idea spread through her college. Students started to have a sense of being a critical part that affects the world. She became radical and got arrested for a couple times in the movement. In 1988, when Betty realized in a women's artist conference held in San Francisco that there were only four Asian American artists out of 800 artists, she decided to speak up by establishing the Asian American Women Artists Association (AAWAA). At that time, Asian American artists were excluded from many exhibitions and galleries. There were no representatives for them until the foundation of the Asian American Women Artists Association (AAWAA).

== Publications ==
- Gender Studies in Okinawa, FY 2012, International Institute for Okinawa Studies, Ryukyu University, "Art as a Vehicle for Transformation from Exposure to Indigenous Religions in Cuba," March 2013.
- International Review of African American Art, vol. 23, Number 2, 2010, "Cultural Collisions for a New Public Space – Theaster Gates," pp. 14 –17.
- Distillations: Meditations on the Japanese American Experience, catalog essay, 2010
- International Review of African American Art: Asian Persuasion, African American Artists Look East, vol 21, Number 3 [2007], "(S)kinship," pp 20 –26.
- Feminist Studies, "Four Northern California Artists: Hisako Hibi, Norine Nishimura, Yong Soon Min and Miran Ahn," vol. 19, no. 3, Fall, 1993, pp 628–642 (cover, photos, text).

== Honors, awards and grants ==
2011: Community Leadership Award, National Japanese American Historical Society

2009: California State Senate Certificate of Recognition, Founding Member of Asian American Women Artists Association

2002: Sisters of Fire Award, Women of Color Resource Center

1991: Rockefeller Foundation Residency Fellowship in the Humanities, Asian American Center, Queens College, New York

1981, 1982: Society for the Encouragement of Contemporary Art (SECA) Finalist

1977: Exhibition Award, San Francisco Arts Festival

== External Resources ==
- Betty Nobue Kano papers, circa 1970-2024 at the Smithsonian's Archives of American Art
