= Madeleine Lim =

Singaporean-American filmmaker and LGBTQ+ activist

- Born: 11 May 1964 (age 62); Singapore
- Education: B.A. in Cinema
- Alma mater: Catholic Junior College; National University of Singapore; San Francisco State University
- Movement: LGBTQ

Madeleine Lim (born 11 May 1964) is a filmmaker, producer, director, cinematographer and LGBTQ activist. She is the founding executive director of the Queer Women of Color Media Arts Project (QWOCMAP), and an adjunct professor of film studies at the University of San Francisco. Lim is also a co-founder of SAMBAL (Singaporean & Malaysian Bisexual Women and Lesbians) and the US Asian Lesbian Network in the San Francisco Bay Area.

== Early life and education ==
Madeleine Lim was born in Singapore on 11 May 1964. Her mother was born in China and adopted by Singaporean parents when she was 6, and her father was born in Malacca, and is of Chinese, Malay, Indian and Portuguese descent. At the age of nine, Lim's parents separated. Her mother later remarried to Lim's half-German and half-Spanish stepfather. She lived with her parents until she was 23 years old.

Lim studied at the Convent of the Holy Infant Jesus for her primary and secondary school education. She then went to Catholic Junior College and finished her diploma in the College of Physical Education.

At the age of 23, she moved to San Francisco to escape persecution by the Singaporean government for her work as a young lesbian artist-activist. She holds a B.A. in Cinema from San Francisco State University, where she was awarded Outstanding Cinema Student of the Year. Since 2004, she has been an adjunct professor of film studies at the University of San Francisco.

== Activism ==
In 1984, Lim, who was 20 years old at the time, ran an underground lesbian feminist newsletter in Singapore for two years. In 1985, a women's discussion group called the "NUS weekly tea group for womyn" was started at the National University of Singapore and Lim became actively involved in its activities, facilitating the weekly discussions and writing articles for its newsletter. Around the same time, Lim became actively involved in Singapore's feminist organization, Association of Women for Action and Research.

In 1987, AWARE organized a dinner in celebration of International Women's Day. For the event, Lim co-wrote and directed a skit called the "Myth Pageant Beauty Contest," a spoof on the "Miss Pageant Beauty Contest." Shortly after the dinner, the Singapore government arrested Lim's co-author during Operation Spectrum, where sixteen people of a mix of Catholic lay workers, social workers, overseas-educated graduates, theatre practitioners and professionals were arrested and detained without trial under Singapore's Internal Security Act (ISA) for their alleged involvement in a Marxist conspiracy. Fearing persecution for her work, Lim left Singapore for New York City, USA in 1987 and eventually made her way to San Francisco, California.

In 1996, Lim made Sambal Belacan in San Francisco. In 1998, Singapore International Film Festival (SGIFF) invited Lim to screen Sambal Belacan in San Francisco during the festival. However, the film was not given a rating by Singapore Board of Film Censors until after the screening date whereby SGIFF was informed that it was banned in Singapore.

In 2000, Lim founded the Queer Women of Color Media Arts Project (QWOCMAP) in San Francisco, "with the belief that a community of artist-activist leaders could change the face of filmmaking and the social justice movement." As the founding Executive/Artistic Director, Lim continues to direct the organization's vision and provides artistic direction for all QWOCMAP programs.

Lim is also a co-founder of SAMBAL (Singaporean & Malaysian Bisexual Women and Lesbians) and the US Asian Lesbian Network in the San Francisco Bay Area in California, USA.

Her films, which have a large focus on the adversity faced by the LGBTQ and Asian Pacific Islander community, have screened at sold-out theaters at international film festivals around the world, including the Vancouver International Film Festival, Mill Valley Film Festival, and Amnesty International Film Festival. Her work has also been featured at museums and universities, and broadcast on PBS to over 2.5 million viewers.

In 2020, Lim's film, Sambal Belacan in San Francisco, was finally allowed a limited viewing during the SGIFF.

== Awards and honors ==
- 1997 Award of Excellence from the San Jose Film & Video Commission's Joey Awards
- 1998 National Educational Media Network Bronze Apple Award
- 2000-2003 California Arts Council Artist-in-Residence
- 2005 LGBT Local Hero Award from KQED-TV
- 2006 APAture Asian American Arts Festival Featured Filmmaker
- 2007 DreamSpeaker Award from Purple Moon Dance Project
- 2010 Phoenix Award from APIQWTC
- 2011 Bayard Rustin Civil Rights Award
- 2013 State Farm Good Neighbor Award
- 2013 Audience Award at the Queer Women of Color Film Festival (for the film The Worlds of Bernice Bing)
- Three time recipient of the San Francisco Arts Commission's Individual Artist Commission

== Published Work/Films ==
- Sambal Belacan in San Francisco (1996)
- Shades of Grey (1996)
- Youth Organizing: Power Through Art (1996)
- A Vision of Smart Growth (2002)
- Dragon Desire (2004)
- The Worlds of Bernice Bing (2013)
