= Kathy Aoki =

American artist

- Citizenship: United States
- Education: Rio Americano High School; University of California, Berkeley; Washington University in St. Louis
- Occupation: Visual artist
- Known for: "Museum of Historical Makeovers"

Kathy Aoki is an American feminist artist. She works in many different mediums, including printmaking, video and painting. Her work is in the permanent collections of the SFMoMA, the Fine Art Museums of San Francisco, the Harvard University Art Museums and in the collections of the city of Seattle.

== Biography ==
Aoki grew up in Natick, Massachusetts, and attended Rio Americano High School, graduating in 1986.

She majored in French at University of California, Berkeley, receiving a bachelor's degree in 1990. Aoki received a MFA degree in printmaking from the St. Louis School of Fine Arts at Washington University in St. Louis in 1994.

She currently lives in Santa Clara, California and is an associate professor of studio art at Santa Clara University. She is married and has two daughters.

== Work ==
Aoki's work explores "gender, beauty and culture consumerism." While she says that her work is feminist, she wants viewers to "feel comfortable" with her work "so that they want to stick around and get the message." Her work often contains pop-culture themes, such as incorporating elements from anime and manga or by referencing My Little Pony: Friendship is Magic (Battle of Kawaii). She has also parodied superheroes and public service messages in her work. In combination with her popular culture themes, Aoki has created the "role as 'curator' of the fictitious Museum of Historical Makeovers" for herself, which allows her to examine consumerism and beauty in a humorous way. Aoki also collaborated with composer Judith Shatin on the 2001 piece Grito del Corazón, inspired by Goya's Black Paintings.

The first time she created a "Museum of Historical Makeovers" in 2009, she created works that superficially resembled actual artifacts until they were examined more closely. Works based on Ancient Egyptian art elevates pop-music stars like Gwen Stefani to roles as pharaohs, with fake hieroglyphs for words such as hip-hop and MP3.
