= Queer Women of Color Media Arts Project =

U.S. non-profit organization

The Queer Women of Color Media Arts Project (QWOCMAP) is a non-profit organization based in San Francisco. It aims to promote the creation, exhibition, and distribution of films that address social justice issues of concern to “address the vital social justice issues that concern LGBT women of color and [their] communities, authentically reflect their life stories, and build community through art and activism.” It provides training, screening opportunities, and resources to filmmakers from underserved communities.

QWOCMAP was founded in 2000 by San Francisco filmmaker Madeleine Lim, using funds from the California Arts Council to run a series of free workshops serving emerging queer women of color filmmakers. Since then, more than 200 new films were created through QWOCMAP's training program. Films created through the program have been showcased at QWOCMAP's annual screening, which began in 2003 with the inaugural screening in the San Francisco LGBT Community Center.

Participants' films have screened at the San Francisco Asian American Film Festival, the SF Latino Film Festival, the SF LGBT Film Festival, the Oakland Black LGBT Film Festival.

== Notable films by participants ==
- A Journey Home (2004): Winner of the 2004 Lesbian & Gay Jury Award at the SF Latino Film Festival
- City of Borders (2009): Winner of the Special Teddy Award at the Berlin International Film Festival
