= Moira Roth =

English feminist art historian (1933–2021)

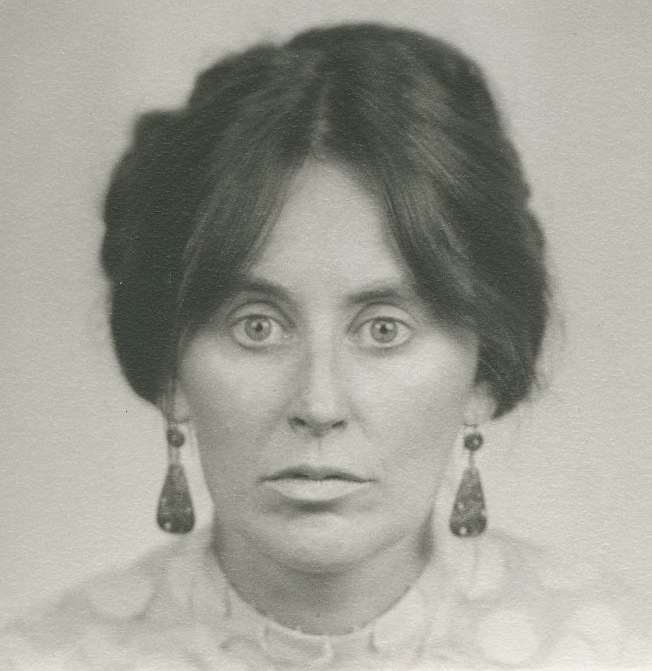
- Roth in 1970
- Born: Moira Shannon; July 24, 1933; London, England
- Died: June 14, 2021 (aged 87); Berkeley, California, United States
- Education: London School of Economics; New York University; University of California, Berkeley
- Writing career
- Years active: 1968–2021
- Genres: Contemporary art feminist art
- Notable awards: Women's Caucus for Art Lifetime Achievement Award, 1997; College Arts Association's National Recognition in the Arts Award, 2006
- Website: moiraroth.net

Moira Roth (née Moira Shannon; 1933–2021) was an English-born American art historian, feminist art critic, and educator.

== Early life and education ==
Roth in !Women Art Revolution

She was born as Moira Shannon on July 24, 1933, in London, and raised in Cornwall, England. Her mother was Eve Shannon was a Canadian immigrant, who hosted Jewish refugees in London. When she was 17 years old she moved from England to Washington, D.C., to live with her Irish father who worked for the International Monetary Fund (IMF).

She was educated at the London School of Economics in England, and received a B.A. degree in sociology; an M.A. degree from New York University; and a PhD from the University of California, Berkeley in 1974.

== Career ==
She was a Trefethen Professor of Art History at Mills College in Oakland, California from 1985 to 2017. She taught at the University of California, San Diego from 1974 to 1985.

She editing The Amazing Decade: Women and Performance Art in America 1970-1980, A Source Book, published by Astro Artz (1983). Her collection of essays, Difference/Indifference: Musings on Postmodernism, Marcel Duchamp and John Cage, was published, with a commentary by Jonathan D. Katz, by Psychology Press (1998), exploring the construction of masculinity and conflicting identities.

She appears in Lynn Hershman Leeson's 2010 documentary film !Women Art Revolution. Roth was interviewed for the Smithsonian Archives of American Art Elizabeth Murray Oral History project.

== Death ==
Roth died at the age of 87 on June 14, 2021, in Berkeley, California.

== Awards and honors ==
She received a Lifetime Achievement Award from the Women's Caucus for Art in 1997, and the National Recognition in the Arts Award from the College Art Association in 2006.

== Publications ==
=== Books ===
- Roth authored and edited numerous books, including writing the introduction and texts (together with commentary by Jonathan D. Katz), Difference/Indifference: Musings on Postmodernism, Marcel Duchamp and John Cage, 1998 in Critical Voices in Art, Theory and Culture Series, Amsterdam, Holland: Gordon and Breach Publishing Group, 1998
- She edited the following books, Rachel Rosenthal, Johns Hopkins University Press, Baltimore, 1997 and Abraham's Daughter: The Life and Times of Rose Hacker, London: Deptford Forum Publishing Ltd., 1996
- She edited and wrote the introduction for, We Flew Over the Bridge; the Memoirs of Faith Ringgold, Little Brown, November 1995 (reprinted in 2005, Duke University Press) and edited and contributed to Connecting Conversations: Interviews with 28 Bay Area Women Artists, Eucalyptus Press, Mills College, 1988 and The Amazing Decade: Women and Performance Art in America 1970-1980, A Source Book, Los Angeles: Astro Artz, 1983.

=== Articles ===
- “Interview with Suzanne Lacy” (abridged by Laura Meyers from the unpublished 1990 interview by Roth with Lacy, Smithsonian Archives of American Art, Washington DC), Entering the Picture: Judy Chicago, the Fresno Feminist Art Program, and the Collective Visions of Women Artists (ed. Jill Fields), New York: Routledge, 2012
- “Villa’s Word in Collision: A Study in Four Part, 1976-2007,” Carlos Villa and the Integrity of Spaces (ed. Theodore S. Gonzalez), San Francisco: Meritage Press, 2011
- Introduction, “Martha Wilson: A Woman With a Mind of Her Own,” Martha Wilson Sourcebook: 40 Years of Reconsidering Performance, Feminism, Alternative Spaces (ed. Martha Wilson), New York: Independent Curators International, 2011
- “Suzanne Lacy: Three Decades of Performing and Writing/Writing and Performing,” in Leaving Art: Suzanne Lacy's Writings on Performance, Politics and Publics, Durham, North Carolina and London: Duke University Press, 2010, pp.xvii-x1i
- “Allan Kaprow’s Tree, a Happening,” Archives of American Art Journal, Smithsonian Institution, Washington DC., Spring 2008
- “Women’s Rights and History, 1910-2008,” in Ginger Wolfe-Suarez: As Long As I live You Will Live, Mills College Art Museum Catalog, 2008 (5 pages)
- “An Interview with John Baldessari (1973),” edited by Naomi Sawelson-Gorse, X-tra, vol. 8, no. 2, 2005, pp. 14–35
- “An Interview with John Cage (1971),” edited by Naomi Sawelson-Gorse, in Etant donné, Paris, No. 6, Fall 2005 (bilingual issue on John Cage and Marcel Duchamp), pp. 136–161
- "Faith Ringgold: Putting Jones Road on the Map," Nka, Journal of Contemporary African Art, #13/14, Spring/Summer 2001. [Part 7 of Traveling Companions/ Fractured Worlds]
- “Suzanne Lacy, Between Aesthetics and Politics” (and an interview), Flintridge Foundation Awards for Visual Artists, 1991–2000, edited by Noriko Gambin and Karen Jacobson, Pasadena: Flintridge Foundation, 2000
- "Of Self and History: Exchanges with Linda Nochlin" Art Journal, Fall 2000, reprinted in Aruna d'Souza, ed., Of Self and History, In Honor of Linda Nochlin, Thames and Hudson 2001. [Part 5 of Traveling Companions/Fractured Worlds]
- "The Aesthetic of Indifference," Artforum, November, 1977. Reprinted (with postscript) in And (English publication), Fall 1990. Reprinted in Dancing Around the Bride: Cage, Cunningham, Rauschenberg, and Duchamp, edited by Carlos Basualdo and Erica F. Battle, Philadelphia Museum of Art, 2012.

== Filmography ==
- !Women Art Revolution (2010) directed by Lynn Hershman Leeson
