= Canyon Sam =

American author and Tibetan rights activist

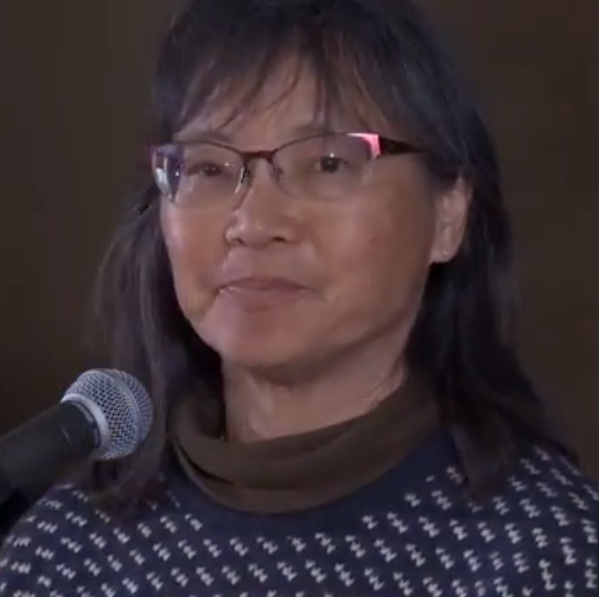
- Reading at the San Francisco Public Library in 2016
- Born: San Francisco, California, US
- Education: San Francisco State University
- Occupations: Writer, artist, activist

Canyon Sam is an American author, performance artist, and Tibetan rights activist. Her honors include the 2010 PEN American Center's Open Book Award, a National Endowment for the Arts scholarship, a San Francisco Arts Commission Individual Artist's grant in literature, and a Screenwriting Fellowship from the Center for Asian American Media, among others. She has published fiction, non-fiction, and drama in many publications.

== Biography ==
She was born and grew up in San Francisco, and took the name Canyon Sam as a teenager after having a dream "about a beautiful canyon". She later earned an M.F.A. in creative writing from San Francisco State University.

She first visited Tibet when it first opened to foreign tourists in 1986. In February 1987, the first international conference on Buddhist nuns was held in Bodh Gaya, India, and Canyon Sam worked there; later back in America she raised funds for Tibetan nuns in exile, which became the Tibetan Nuns Project.

In 2007, she returned to Tibet and interviewed various Tibetan women; in 2009, she published a book that "recounts Tibet's recent past through the lives of four Tibetan women," titled Sky Train: Tibetan Women on the Edge of History.

In 2011, a short documentary about her life premiered, titled A Woman Named Canyon Sam.

Canyon Sam also created a one-woman show called The Dissident, about her travels in China and Tibet and her human rights work with Buddhist nuns, which played at the Walker Art Center, the Asia Society, New York, and the Solo Mio festival, and headlined the National Women's Theater Festival. It was later made into a film.

She is openly lesbian.
