= Genny Lim =

American poet, playwright and performer (born 1946)

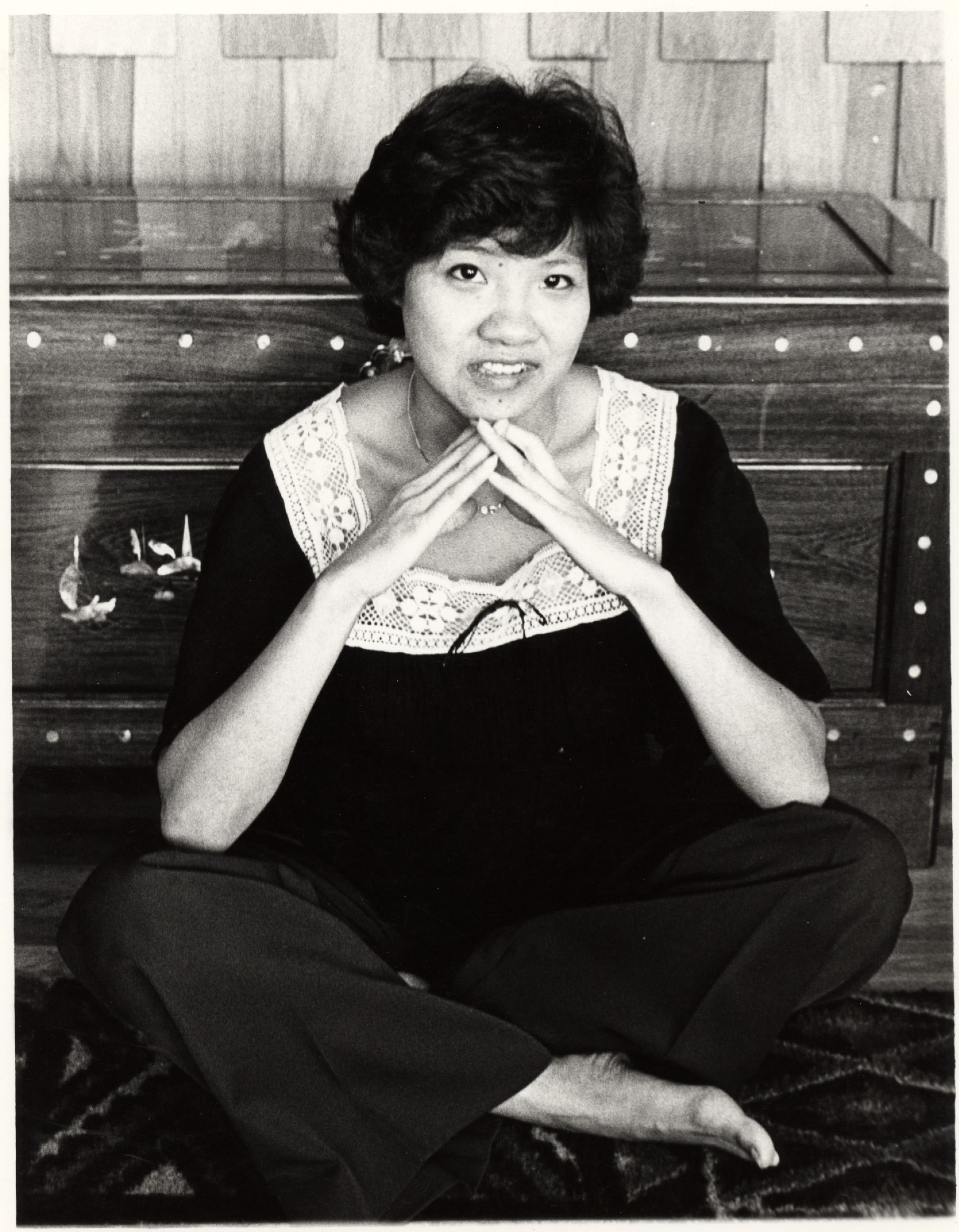
- Lim in 1975
- Born: Genevieve Lim; December 15, 1946 (age 79); San Francisco, California, U.S.
- Education: San Francisco State University (BA, MA); Columbia University Graduate School of Journalism
- Occupations: Poet; playwright; performer
- Children: 2
- Writing career
- Notable awards: American Book Award (1982)

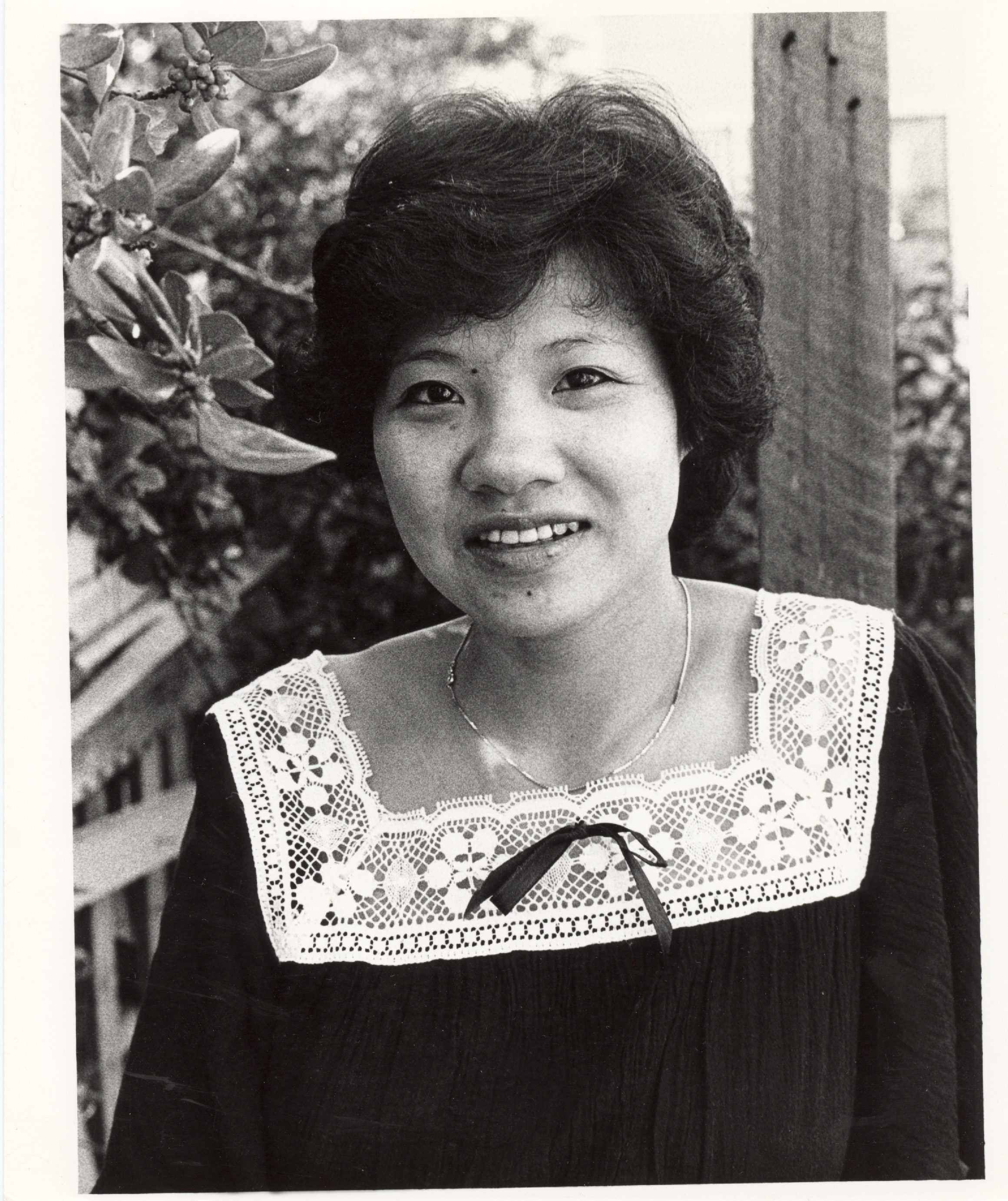
Genny Lim in San Francisco, 1975

Genevieve (Genny) Lim (born December 15, 1946, in San Francisco, California) is an American poet, playwright, and performer. She is the ninth poet laureate of San Francisco, California, and the first Chinese American in the role. She was the Chair of Community Arts and Education Committee, and Chair of the Advisory Board for the San Francisco Writers Corps. She has performed with Max Roach, Herbie Lewis, Francis Wong, and Jon Jang among others in San Francisco, San Jose, San Diego, Houston and Chicago.

== Life ==
She graduated with her BA and MA from San Francisco State University, and later with a certificate in broadcast journalism from Columbia University in 1973. She teaches at the California Institute of Integral Studies. She lives in San Francisco with her two daughters, Colette and Danielle. Her papers are held at University of California Santa Barbara.

== Awards ==
- 1981 American Book Award from the Before Columbus Foundation
- Bay Guardian Goldie, Creative Work Fund and Rockefeller for "Songline: The Spiritual Tributary of Paul Robeson Jr. and Mei Lanfang," collaboration with Jon Jang and James Newton.
- James Wong Howe Award for Paper Angels (Premiered July 2000, UC Zellerbach Playhouse).
- 2022 Reginald Lockett Lifetime Achievement Award from PEN Oakland

== Works ==
- Wings of Lai Ho. Translated by Gordon Lew. Illustrator Andrea Ja Chinese. San Francisco, Calif: East/West Pub. Co. 1982.
- Him Mark Lai; Genny Lim; Judy Yung, eds. (June 1999). Island: Poetry and History of Chinese Immigrants on Angel Island. University of Washington Press. ISBN 978-0-295-97109-4.
- Contributed to This Bridge Called My Back in 1981.
- Featured poet in festivals that took place in Venezuela, Sarajevo, Italy and Bosnia-Hercegovina (2007).

=== Poetry ===
- Winter Place. Kearney St Workshop Press. 1989. ISBN 978-0-9609630-4-1.
- Child of War. University of Hawaii Press. January 2003. ISBN 978-0-9709597-3-7.
- Paper Gods and Rebels. Ishmael Reed Publishing Co. January 2013. ISBN 978-0-918408013.

=== Plays ===
- Paper Angels and Bitter Cane/Two Plays. Kalamaku Press. December 1991. ISBN 978-0-9623102-1-8.

=== Anthologies ===
- Roberta Uno, ed. (1993). "Paper Angels". Unbroken Thread: Anthology of Plays by Asian American Women. University of Massachusetts Press. ISBN 978-0-87023-856-7.
- Velina Hasu Houston; Wakako Yamauchi; Genny Lim, eds. (1993). The Politics of Experience: Four Plays by Asian American Women. Temple University Press. ISBN 978-1-56639-001-9.
- Linda Wagner-Martin; Cathy N. Davidson, eds. (1999). Oxford Book of Women's Writing. Oxford University Press. ISBN 978-0-19-513245-8.
- Genny Lim, ed. (2020). Window: glimpses of our storied past. Asian Pacific Islander Cultural Center. ISBN 978-0578734583.
