= Terry Acebo Davis =

Filipino American artist and nurse

- Born: 1953 (age 72–73); Oakland, California, U.S.
- Education: California State University, Hayward; San Jose State University
- Known for: art
- Website: www.terryacebodavis.gallery

Terry Acebo Davis (born 1953) is a Filipino American artist and nurse based in the San Francisco Bay Area. Her art is thematically linked to her family and her origins as a Filipino American.

== Early life and education ==
Born in Oakland, California, the oldest of six children, Acebo Davis gained a Bachelor of Science in nursing from California State University, Hayward in 1976, followed by graduate coursework in Pediatric Oncology at the University of California, San Francisco. In 1991 she was awarded a Bachelor of Fine Arts by San Jose State University, followed by an MFA in 1993.

Rather than become a full-time artist, Acebo Davis chose to balance making art with work as a professional nurse, serving as a Pediatric Critical Care Transport Specialist at Stanford Medical Center.

Jan Rindfleisch writes, "Acebo Davis has bridged worlds in multiple ways. As a Filipino American growing up in Fremont, she had come with her family often to Japantown to buy rice. As an artist and graduate of SJSU, she chose to live in Palo Alto, a midpoint between the arts centers of San Jose, San Francisco, and Oakland."

== Career ==
=== Artistic themes and works ===
Acebo Davis's art is heavily rooted in her origins as a Filipino American, her family, and racial strife and collision. Dahil Sa Yo, her "seminal work", features repetitive images of her mother set behind multiple boxes of shoes, drawing on the public persona of Imelda Marcos. The repetition of the image serves to emphasize the importance of her mother and other women of her generation, who "held together their families and looked after their home" as immigrants.

About her artwork Phoebe Farris writes, "Acebo Davis’ ability to not only manage but lucidly express her complex identity of Filipino American printmaker/mixed-media artist/lecturer/nurse that fuels her highly meditative work. [...] Acebo Davis presents to her viewers visual mantras, simultaneously pleasing in their careful compositions yet hauntingly thought-provoking in their subject matter.”

Benjamin Pimentel of the San Francisco Chronicle states “The marks she makes chronicle her many journeys an Asian American woman, a caregiver and an artist.”

=== Community engagement ===
Acebo Davis has served as Chairwoman of the Palo Alto Public Art Commission; as a Trustee for Arts Council Silicon Valley; board president and Advisor for WORKS/San Jose.

She is a member of the DIWA Filipino artists' collective, and regularly lectures on the Filipino identity, including lectures at the Smithsonian Institution, the University of Pennsylvania and Mills College.

== Awards and distinctions ==
In 1997 she was awarded the James D. Phelan Award by Kala Art Institute, along with the Radius Award of the Palo Alto Art Center. The same year, she participated in the exhibition Families: Rebuilding, Recreating, Reinventing curated by Flo Oy Wong at the Euphrat Museum of Art.

Acebo Davis received an artist residency at the Frans Masereel Centre in Kasterlee, Belgium in 1998.

In 2003, Acebo Davis was awarded one of the three annual Arts Council Silicon Valley Fellowships.

In 2004 she became the first Filipino American to exhibit art at the Asian Art Museum of San Francisco's Samsung Hall, where her piece Tabing Rising, visually describing her family's immigration to the United States in 1945, was displayed in 2004.

== Exhibitions ==
=== Solo exhibitions ===
- 2009 Tri-age, Triton Museum, Santa Clara, CA
- 2007 Gawa sa Belgium, Ayala Foundation, Redwood City, CA
- 2005 Tracing Ritual, Cabrillo College Gallery, Aptos, CA
- 2004 Tabing Rising, Asian Art Museum Samsung Hall, San Francisco, CA
- 2004 Anatomy of Spirit, Stanford University - Institute on Women & Gender, Stanford, CA
- 2003 Diwata, Babilonia 1808, Berkeley, CA
- 2001 Nepal and Black, Washington Square Gallery, San Francisco, CA
- 1998 New Work, Washington Square Gallery, San Francisco, CA
- 1996 Of the Body, Boom Gallery, Honolulu, HI
- 1995 Cantho into Haarlem: New Works, Richard Sumner Gallery, Palo Alto, CA
- 1993 Redefining Self: The Flip Side, San Jose State University, San Jose, CA

=== Group exhibitions ===
- 2023 Resilience, Contra Costa County Hospital in Martinez, CA
- 2023 Palo Alto Studios Celebrates 20 years, Palo Alto Studios Gallery, Palo Alto Art Studio Artists Group, Palo Alto, CA
- 2023 Art in the Garden, Gamble Gardens, Palo Alto, CA
- 2022 Begin Again, Palo Alto Studios Gallery /Palo Alto Art Studio Artists Group, Palo Alto, CA
- 2021 An Art Affair, Palo Alto Studios Gallery /Palo Alto Art Studio Artists Group, Palo Alto, CA
- 2020 COVID Times, Palo Alto Studios Gallery /Palo Alto Art Studio Artists Group, Palo Alto, CA
- 2015 Constructs, Wing Luke Museum, Seattle WA
- 2015 Books, Smith Anderson Editions Palo Alto, CA
- 2014 Anniversary of South Bay Area Artists, Artik San Jose, CA
- 2012 Gender Specific, Smith Anderson Editions, Palo Alto, CA
- 2009 Print Retrospective with Artists, Bill Gould Design and Architecture, San Jose, CA
- 2009 A Space of Her Own with Asian American Women in Art, De Young Museum's Kimball Gallery San Francisco, CA
- 2008 Tortilla Curtain Project, Krause Center for Innovation Gallery at Foothill College, Los Altos, CA
- 2007 From Hedonopolis to Melancolony, University of San Francisco Thatcher Gallery, San Francisco, CA
- 2007 Overmapped, SOMA San Francisco, CA
- 2007 Dealer's Choice, Smith Anderson Editions, Palo Alto, CA
- 2006 Contemporary Filipino American Artists, Contemporary Museum of Hawaii, Honolulu, HI
- 2006 181st Invitational of Contemporary Art, National Academy Museum, New York, NY
- 2006 Out of the Box, Palo Alto Art Center, Palo Alto, CA
- 2006 Pacific Prints, Pacific Art League, Palo Alto, CA
- 2003 Triton Museum, Arts Council Silicon Valley Fellowship Awardee Exhibition, Santa Clara, CA
- 2002 Global Dialogue, Antwerp Center, Antwerp, Belgium
- 2001 Pinoy / Pinay, San Francisco Arts Commission Gallery, San Francisco, CA
- 2000 Bae, Luggage Store, San Francisco, CA
- 1999 To Be... , WORKS Art and Performance, San Jose, CA
- 1998 Destiny Manifesting with DIWA Arts Collective, Galeria de La Raza, San Francisco, CA
- 1998 Sister City Sisters: San Francisco Babaylan, Contemporary Art Installations: Art by eight San Francisco Women Artists, Museo ng Maynila, Manila Philippines and San Francisco State University Fine Arts Gallery, San Francisco, CA
- 1998 Re-Orientation, Washington Square Gallery, San Francisco, CA
- 1998 Prints, Stanford Art Spaces, Stanford University, CA
- 1998 1898- Critical Points and Balikbayan Box: Tracing a Strain with DIWA Arts, Bronx Museum, NY
- 1998 Seino Ka? ano Ka? Fine Art Gallery, San Francisco State University, CA
- 1997 Respect Diversity, Mountain View City Hall, Mountain View, CA
- 1997 Families: Rebuilding, Reinventing, Recreating, Euphrat Museum, Cupertino, CA
- 1997 Multicultural Perspectives, Koret Gallery, Palo Alto, CA
- 1997 Bay Area's Diversity in Art, Synopsis, Inc. Office, Mountain View, CA
- 1997 Message to the Next Generation, Oakland Asian Cultural Center, Oakland, CA
- 1996 Art in the Urban Landscape - Bayanihan Transition with DIWA Arts, Capp Street Project, San Francisco, CA
- 1996 Memories of Overdevelopment: Philippine Diaspora in Contemporary Visual Art with DIWA Arts, University of California, Irvine
- 1996 Kayumanggi Presence '96, East-West Gallery, University of Hawaii, Honolulu, HI
- 1995 Biennial Print Competition and Exhibition, Triton Art Museum, Santa Clara, CA
- 1995 Canto into Haarlem, Richard Sumner, Gallery, Palo Alto, CA
- 1995 13th Annual National Juried Exhibition, Los Angeles Printmaking Society, Loyola Marymount University, Los Angeles, CA
- 1995 Filipinas in Hawaii, The Philippine Consulate General, Honolulu, HI
- 1995 Artists Respond to Proposition 187, San Jose Center for Latino Arts, San Jose, CA
- 1995 Black and White, Lucy Berman Gallery, Palo Alto, CA
- 1995 The Dresden Exchange, Institute of Contemporary Art, San Jose, CA; Bay Area Artists, Dresden, Germany
- 1994 Yellow Forest, SOMAR Gallery, San Francisco, CA
- 1994 Making Women Artists Visible, Galería Tonantzin, San Juan Bautista, CA
- 1994 Bay Area Artists, Galerie Adlergasse, Dresden, Germany
- 1994 Día de Los Muertos, Yerba Buena Center for the Arts, San Francisco, CA
- 1994 Summer Artists Residency Exhibition, Reese Bullen Gallery at Humboldt State University Arcata, CA
- 1993 Works on Paper, Berkeley Art Center, Berkeley. CA
- 1993 Object as Identity, 1078 Gallery, Chico, CA
- 1993 Printmakers, Walter Bischoff Gallery-Amerikahaus, Stuttgart, Germany
- 1993 American Exhibition, Stuttgart International Airport, Stuttgart, Germany
- 1993 Kayumanggi Presence, Academy Art Center at Linekona, Honolulu, HI
- 1993 Time Echoes, C. N. Norman Gallery, University of California, Davis, CA
- 1992 San Jose State University Art Faculty, Simon and Schuster Publishers, Santa Clara, CA
- 1992 The Fourth Floor, Market Street Alternative Space, San Jose, CA
- 1992 Harmony of Cultures, Bingham Gallery, San Jose, CA
- 1991 New Printmakers Invitational, California State University, Long Beach, CA

== Bibliography ==
- Farris, Phoebe (1999). Women Artists of Color: A Bio-Critical Sourcebook to 20th Century Artists in the Americas. Greenwood Press. ISBN 0313303746.
- De Jesus, Melinda L. (2005). Pinay Power: Peminist Critical Theory : Theorizing the Filipina/American Experience. Psychology Press. ISBN 0415949823.
- Hallmark, Kara Kelley (2007). Encyclopedia of Asian American Artists. Greenwood Publishing Group. ISBN 978-0313334511.
- Luluguisen, Evelyn; Galedo, Lillian (2008). Filipinos in the East Bay. Arcadia Publishing. ISBN 978-0738558325.
- Rindfleisch, Jan; Alvarez, Maribel L.; Jayadev, Raj; Hom, Nancy; Sherman, Ann (2017). Roots & Offshoots : Silicon Valley's Arts Community. Santa Clara, CA. ISBN 978-0-9983084-0-1. OCLC 988950620.
- Rindfleisch, Jan; with Ann Sherman, Nancy Hom, and essay by Karen Tseng (2024). Building Together. Santa Clara, CA: Ginger Press, 2024. ISBN 979-8-218-98755-8
