= Roy Ragle =

Artist

Roy Ward Ragle (December 8, 1944 – December 11, 2014) was a San Francisco artist known for his self-portraits executed in large woodcuts. Inspired by the Japanese tradition of Ukiyo-e, his prints were linear in character, finely detailed, but with imagery traced in a web of thin, coiled and looping lines, creating a woodcut that was often mistaken for an etching. Ragle’s persistent attempt of capturing his own features in his woodcuts was triggered by a diagnosis of Crohn’s disease in the early 1970s, a chronic illness that would mark his life and his art. The medications so affected and altered his features that his prints became a way of preserving and rescuing a sense of identity. As Kenneth Baker noted in Roy Ragle's obituary: "Mr. Ragle (...) had long depicted death as his companion in woodcuts and prints in other media, in a manner reminiscent of European dance of death imagery and to Mexican folk art tradition."

== Early life and education ==
Roy Ragle was born in National City in Southern California in 1944. He received his B.A. from San Diego State University in 1968 and his M.F.A. from the San Francisco Art Institute in 1974. He taught relief printmaking at San Francisco State University from 1976 until 1979, the year when his illness became severe.

== Career ==
Upon seeing the first exhibit of self-portrait woodcuts at the Jehu/Wong Gallery in San Francisco 1981, Thomas Albright notes in the San Francisco Chronicle: "His features themselves undergo alterations, as do their expressions: frequently stoical, occasionally agonized. But Ragle never concedes to the rhetoric of tragedy; expressionism is kept in a precise balance with a coolly aloof, almost clinical self-scrutiny."

Started in January 1973, at the beginning of his MFA program, the series of woodcuts called Self-Portrait would persist till 1981, resulting in 54 large woodcuts printed in an edition of 10 each, several of which being oversize. His most monumental statement in woodcut stands as the culmination of this series. It is entitled “Self-Examination Series Part II,” a triptych in which Ragle’s self-portrait is flanked by that of Carol, his wife and Susan Dunn, his therapist who later would also die of Crohn's disease. The work measures 108” by 48” and the three blocks began as a body print: with their thrift shop clothes inked up, each of them was lowered with ropes onto the wood, and this inked impression was then carved and added to by Ragle in extreme detail using a dental dremel. The densely worked surface of the triptych, with the arduous process of creating the ridges of wood to simulate the lines, was a task that took him from 1987 to 1990. It was Roy Ragle’s last great statement in woodcut, a declaration of triumph in the face of illness and this in an exacting technique. Due to the demands of his approach to the medium and due to his poor health, Roy Ragle moved on and explored more experimental approaches to printmaking. On the occasion of a retrospective of Ragle’s work in 2000, Karin Breuer describes the transition as follows: "Roy developed a form of monotype using relief matrices made from aluminum foil. It was a successful substitute for woodcut that enabled him to continue working on his autobiographical self-portrait subjects. The foil monotype relief prints have evolved into a kind of body art as Roy creates a mold of his face using the foil which is then distorted when inked and flattened during printing."

These later works employing the foil are hybrid and unique works that defy easy classification. The surfaces are complex, densely layered and overworked with pen and ink. The often grim nature of the imagery is held in check with the complex treatment of the surfaces. The foil masks pressed against the faces of himself, of family and friends, bear little resemblance to the final monoprints, the matrix often trampled underfoot. As Herlinde Spahr notes: "These steps lead to a print in which the matrix is crushed in the act of creation and the image, the portrait itself, must share in that fate. These unique prints compress in their surface a number of printmaking steps, each successive layer doubling the distance between the original mask and its final copy." And yet, as in the foil monoprint of Crossing the River Styx’s Series, Portrait of Margie Cotner Potts, the trampled and deformed mask can become a shimmering, gentle presence.

== Legacy ==
Roy Ragle died on December 11, 2014, three days after turning 70. His work had been shown in prominent San Francisco galleries: the John Berggruen Gallery, the Don Soker Gallery, the Meridian Gallery. He had major exhibitions at the Legion of Honor Museum in San Francisco, and at the Triton Museum of Art in Santa Clara. Roy Ragle was a longtime member of the California Society of Printmakers of which he was made an honorary member in 2005. His work is represented by the Annex Galleries in Santa Rosa. Extensive collections of his prints can be found in the Achenbach Graphic Arts Collection of the Legion of Honor Museum in San Francisco, in the collection of the Hearst Art Gallery at St. Mary’s College of California in Moraga, and in the collection of the Turner Print Museum at the California State University at Chico among others. The Bancroft Library of Manuscripts and Rare Books at UC Berkeley holds a large collection of illustrated letters from Roy Ragle covering the period of 1987 to 2014.
