= SoFA District =

- Neighborhood of San Jose
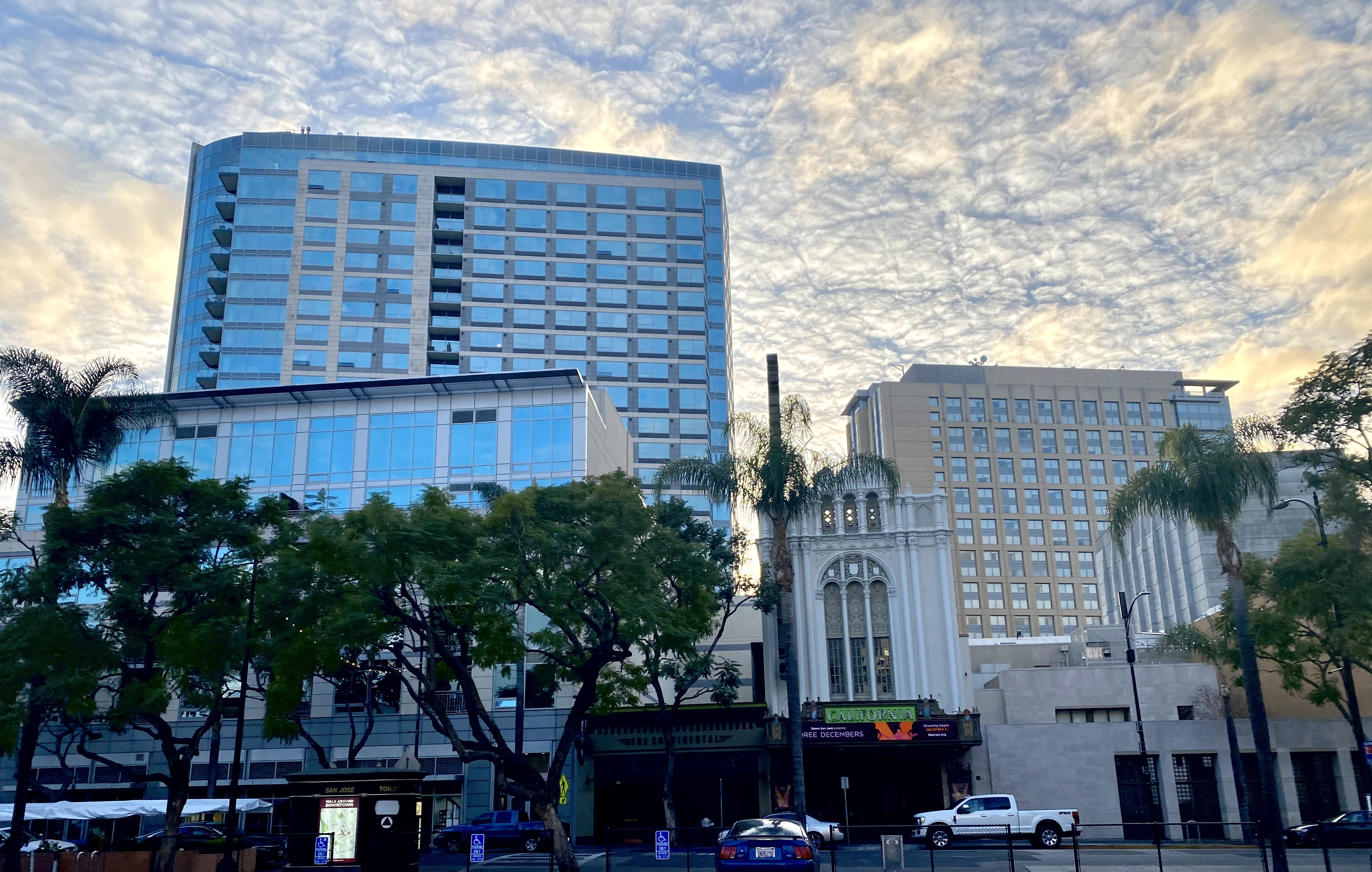
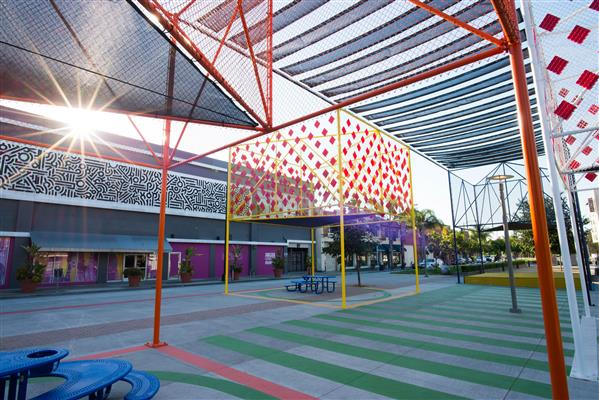
- Top: SoFA skyline; Bottom: Parque de los Pobladores

- Location within San Jose, California
- Coordinates: 37.330861°N 121.885910°W
- Country: United States
- State: California
- County: Santa Clara
- City: San Jose
- ZIP Code: 95113

SoFA (South First Area) is an arts, cultural, and entertainment district of Downtown San Jose, California. Home to numerous cultural institutions, art galleries, and theatre companies, including the Institute of Contemporary Art San José, the San José Opera, and the Symphony San Jose, SoFA bills itself as "Silicon Valley's Creative District".

== History ==
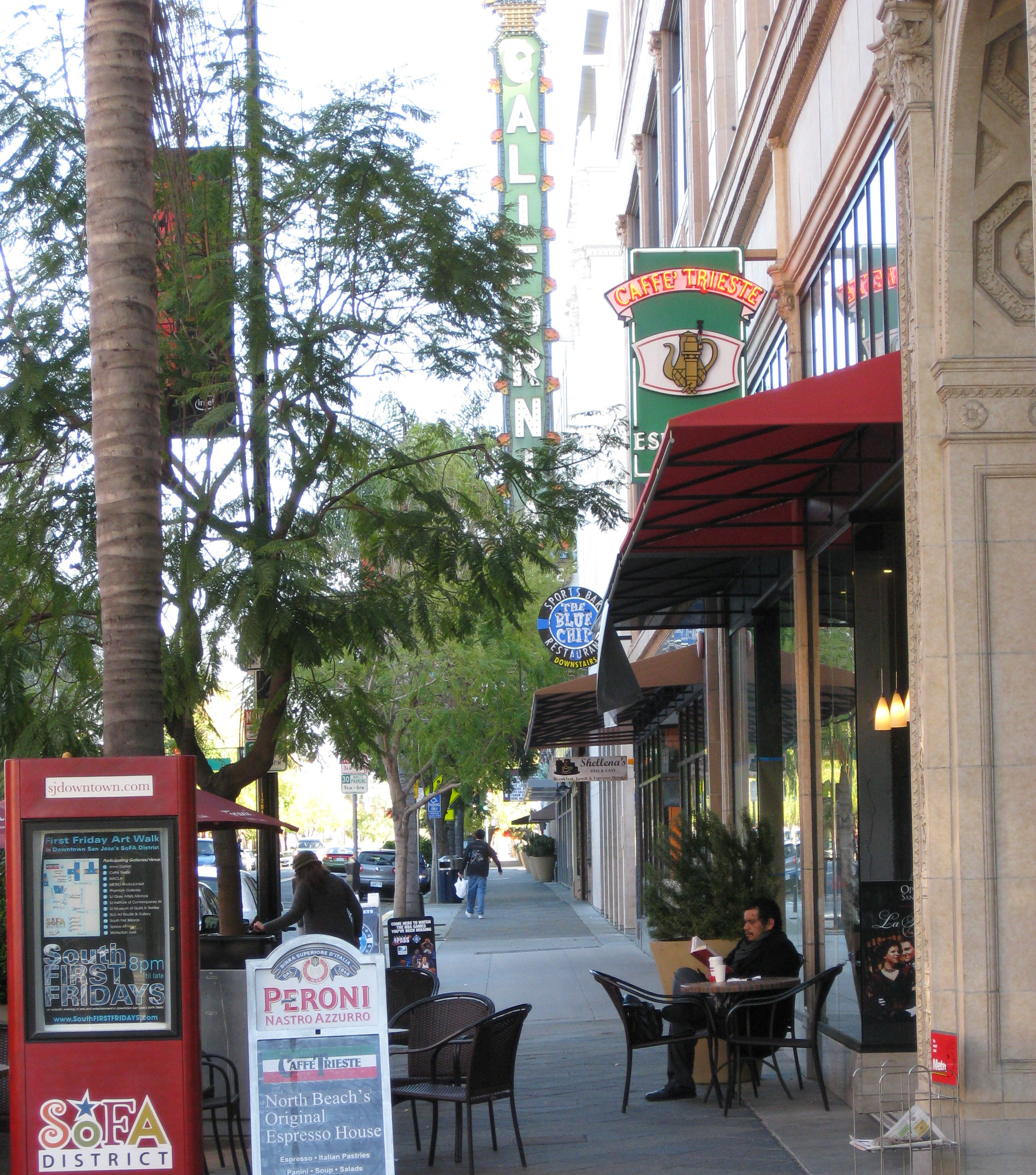
South 1st Street.

The commercial street had been a major retail district of San Jose in the late 1800s and early part of the 20th century, but by the 1970s had fallen into decline along with much of downtown San Jose as the city expanded and retail moved to suburban shopping centers.

By the late 1970s, it had become a red light district overrun with adult movie theaters and street prostitution. The adult businesses were zoned out in the late 1980s under an initiative spearheaded by then-downtown councilwoman Susan Hammer. Nightclubs began opening and the district became known as SoFA during that period.

In 2011, Arts Place, a consortium of 11 large foundations, granted $500,000 to a SoFA Initiative proposed by the 1stAct nonprofit to turn Parque de los Pobladores into an “urban plaza” and an "outdoor living room" for SoFA. The project removed the park's mature trees and expanded the park's footprint with a concrete plaza.

== Culture ==
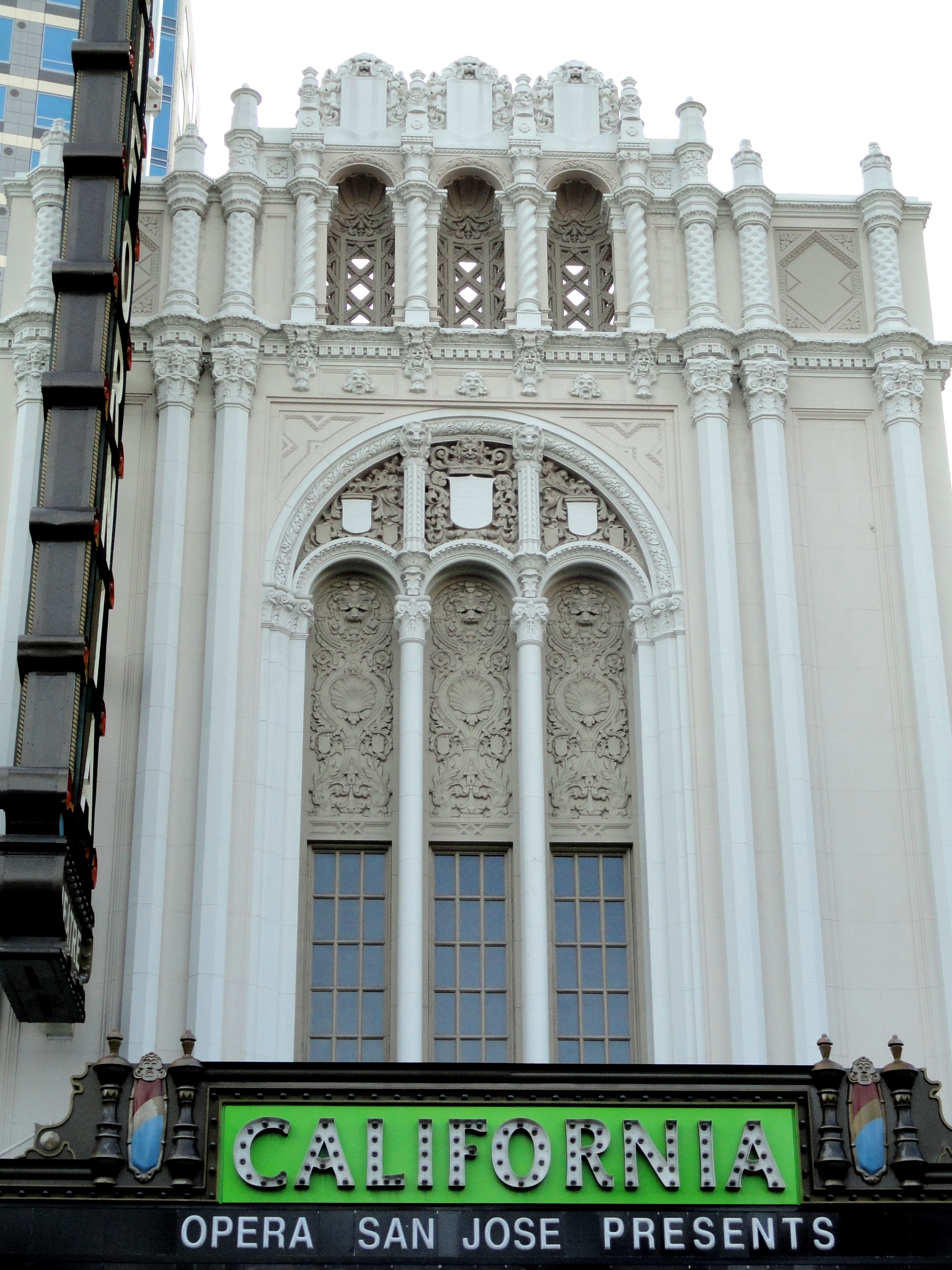
The California Theatre hosts the annual Cinequest Film Festival.

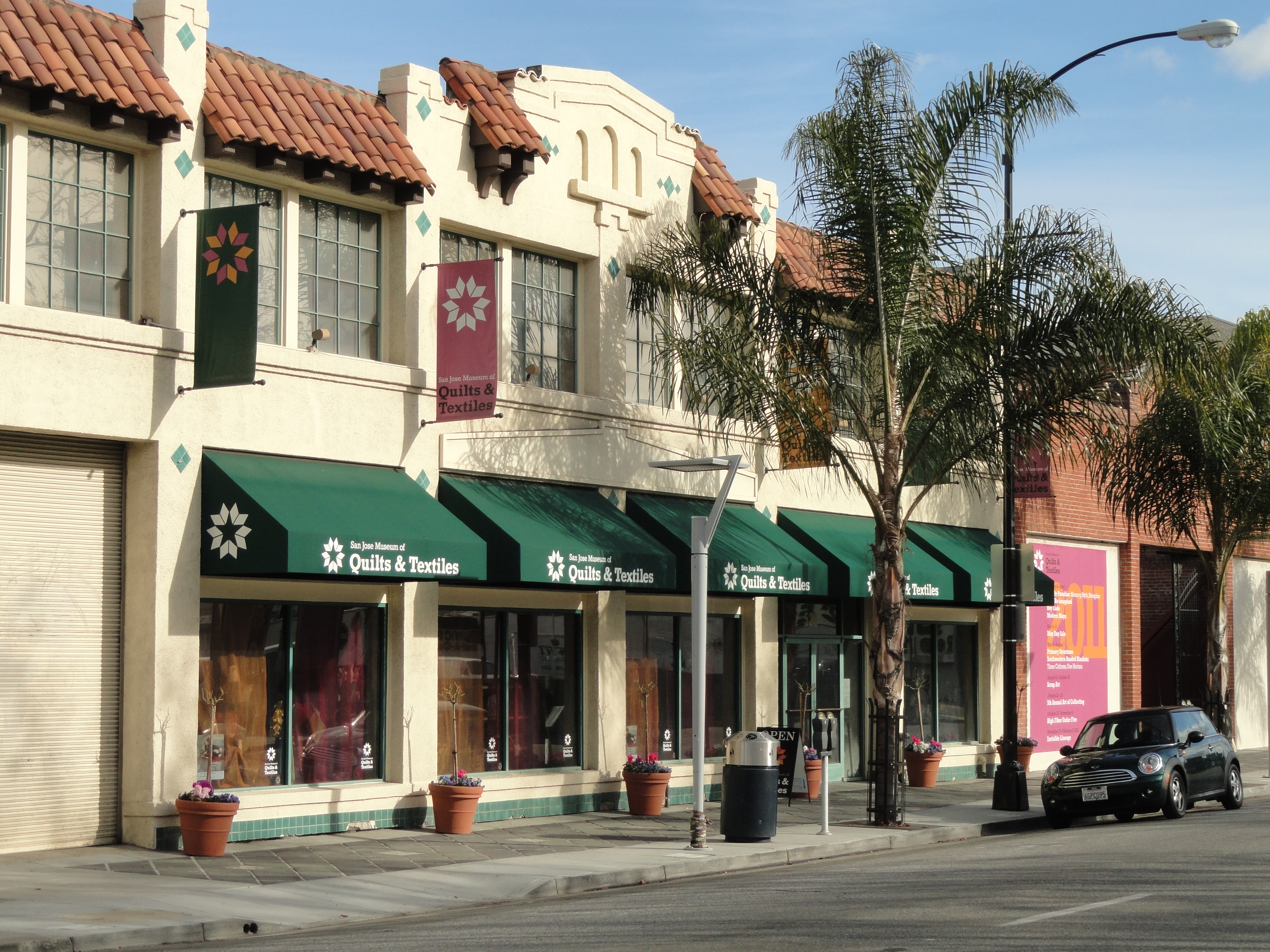
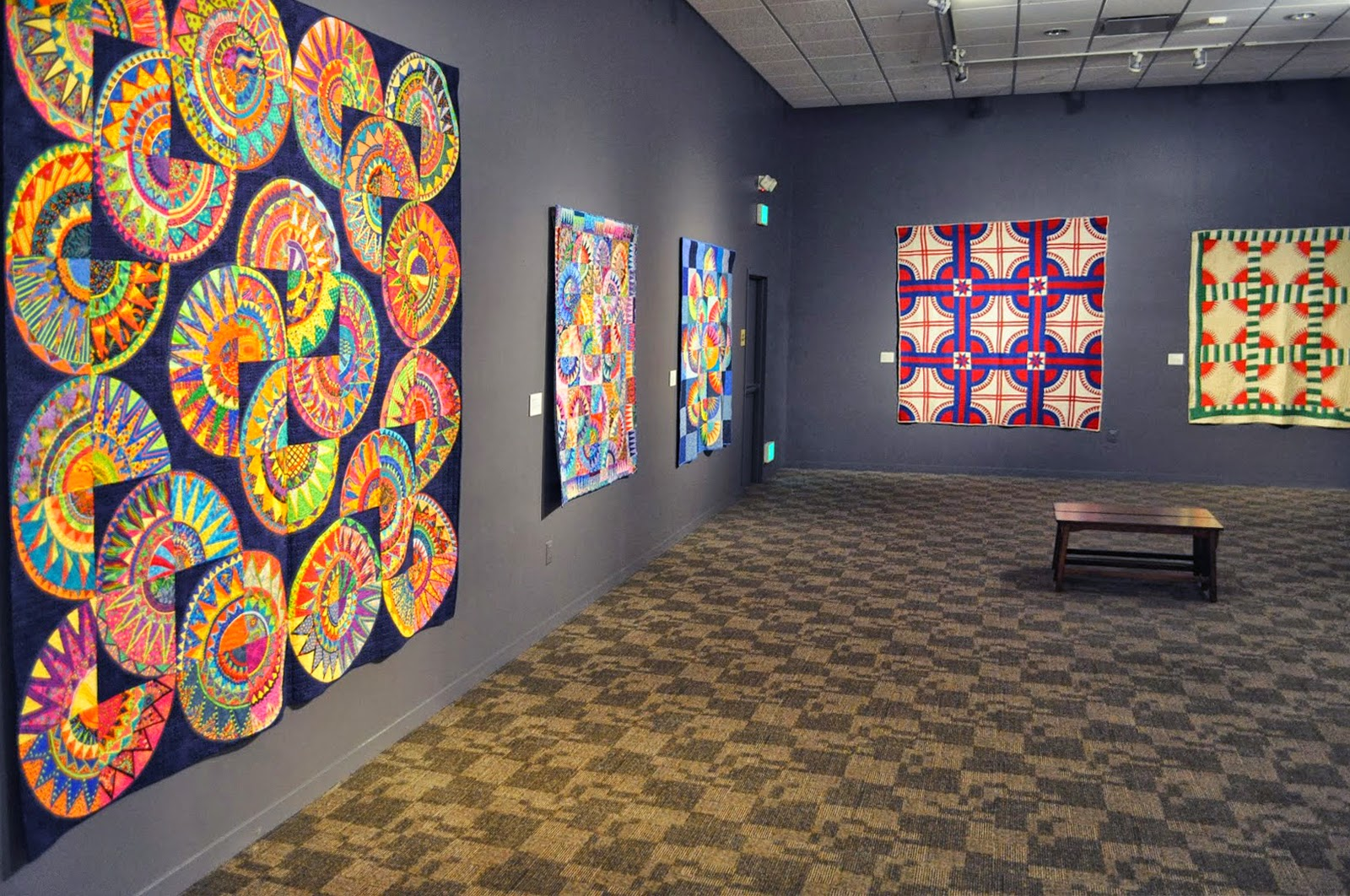
The San Jose Museum of Quilts & Textiles is the United States' oldest museums of textiles.

SoFA is home to the historic California Theater, Symphony San Jose, Cinequest film festival, San Jose Stage Company, City Lights Theater Company, Movimiento de Arte y Cultura Latino Americana (MACLA), the Original Joe's restaurant, and the free weekly newspaper Metro Silicon Valley.

The district is home to art galleries and museums such as Anno Domini, the Institute of Contemporary Art San José (ICA), and the San Jose Museum of Quilts & Textiles, WORKS/San José, Anno Domini Gallery, as well as creative design firms such as Decca Design, Liquid Agency, and Whipsaw.

SoFA is the site of several city festivals and events, including South First Fridays, the SoFA Street Fair, the Zero1 Biennial, Subzero, C2SV and SoFA Sundays.

There are a number of gyms and fitness options including Studio Climbing, Downtown Yoga Shala and Heroes Martial Arts (Brazilian jiu-jitsu)

Nightclubs include Mama Kin (Cafe Stritch), The Ritz, Agenda, Backbar SoFA, Aura, Cafe Frascati, Haberdasher, the Fountainhead and Continental Lounge.

=== Notable institutions ===
- Anno Domini Gallery
- Institute of Contemporary Art San José (ICA)
- Movimiento de Arte y Cultura Latino Americana (MACLA)
- San Jose Museum of Quilts & Textiles
- San José Opera
- Symphony San Jose
- WORKS/San José

== Geography ==
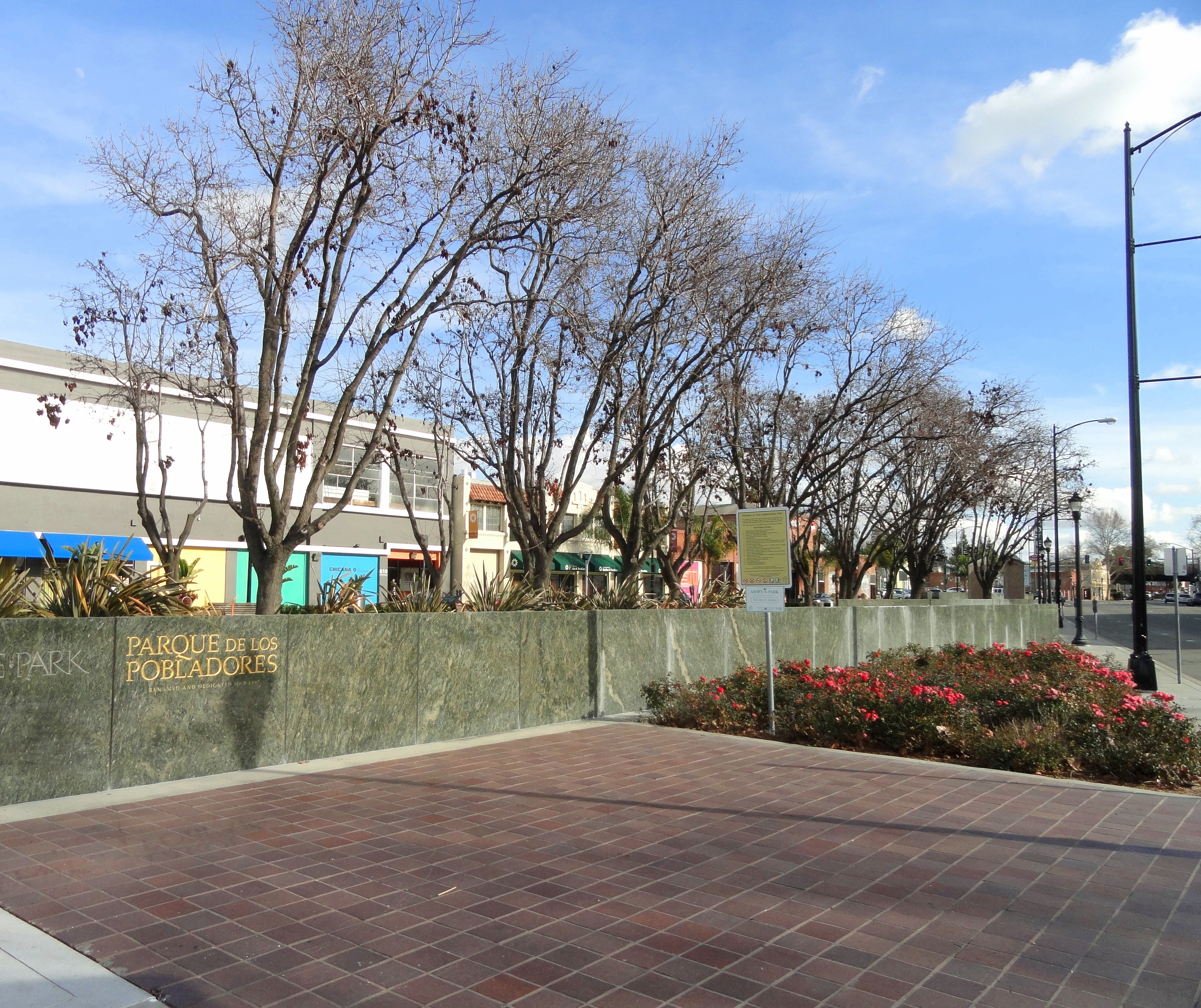
Parque de los Pobladores.

Its location centered on three blocks of South 1st Street, from Reed St. to San Carlos St. The area was named by local business people after the San Jose Redevelopment Agency unsuccessfully named it the “Market Gateway” district.

=== Parks ===
- Parque de los Pobladores
