= Movimiento de Arte y Cultura Latino Americana =

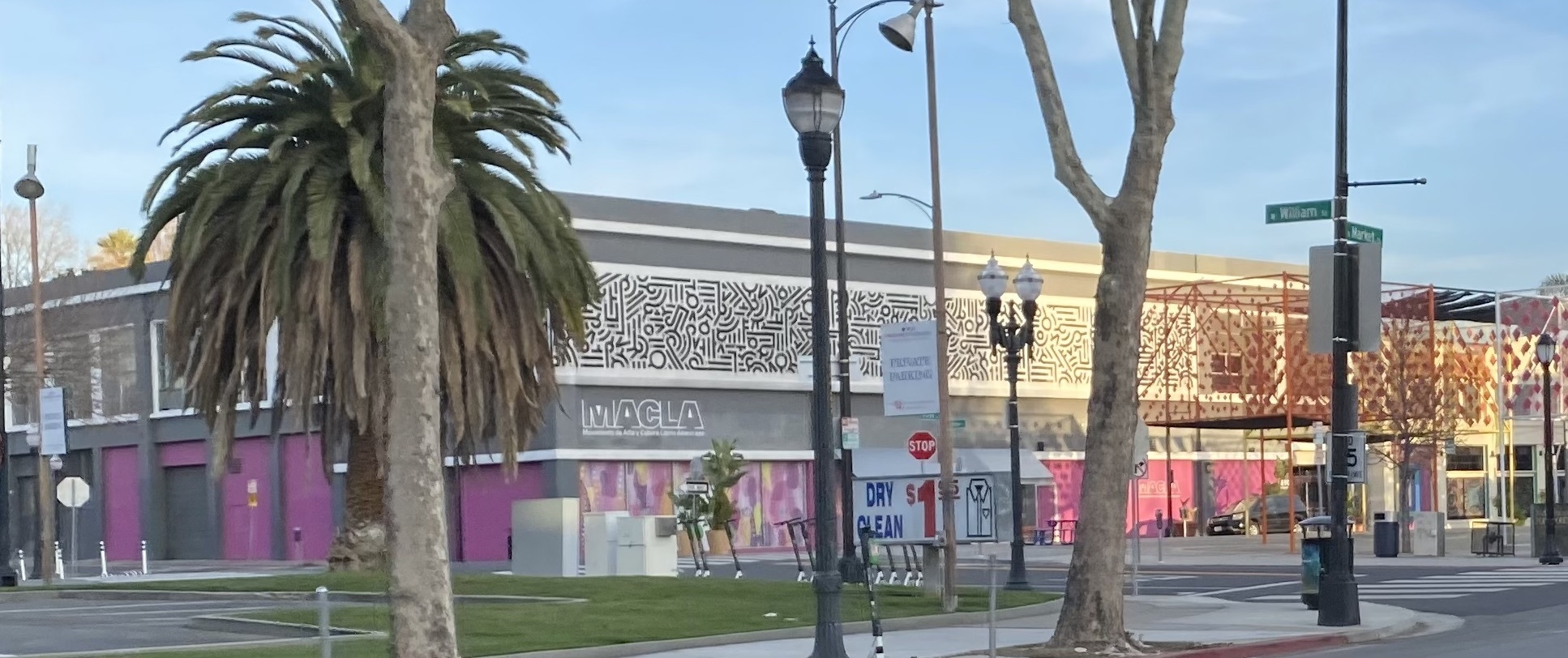
- Established: 1989
- Location: 510 South First Street, San Jose, California
- Coordinates: 37.328°N 121.884°W
- Type: Art museum, community art program, performing arts
- Executive director: Anjee Helstrup-Alvarez
- Website: https://maclaarte.org/

Movimiento de Arte y Cultura Latino Americana (MACLA) is a contemporary arts space focused on the Chicano and Latino experience and history, located in the SoFA district at 510 South First Street in San Jose, California. The museum was founded in 1989, in order to encourage civic dialog and social equity. The current programming includes visual art, performing and literary arts, youth arts education, and a community art program. The space has two performing arts spaces, a gallery and the MACLA Castellano Playhouse and they frequently host poetry readings and film screenings.

== History ==
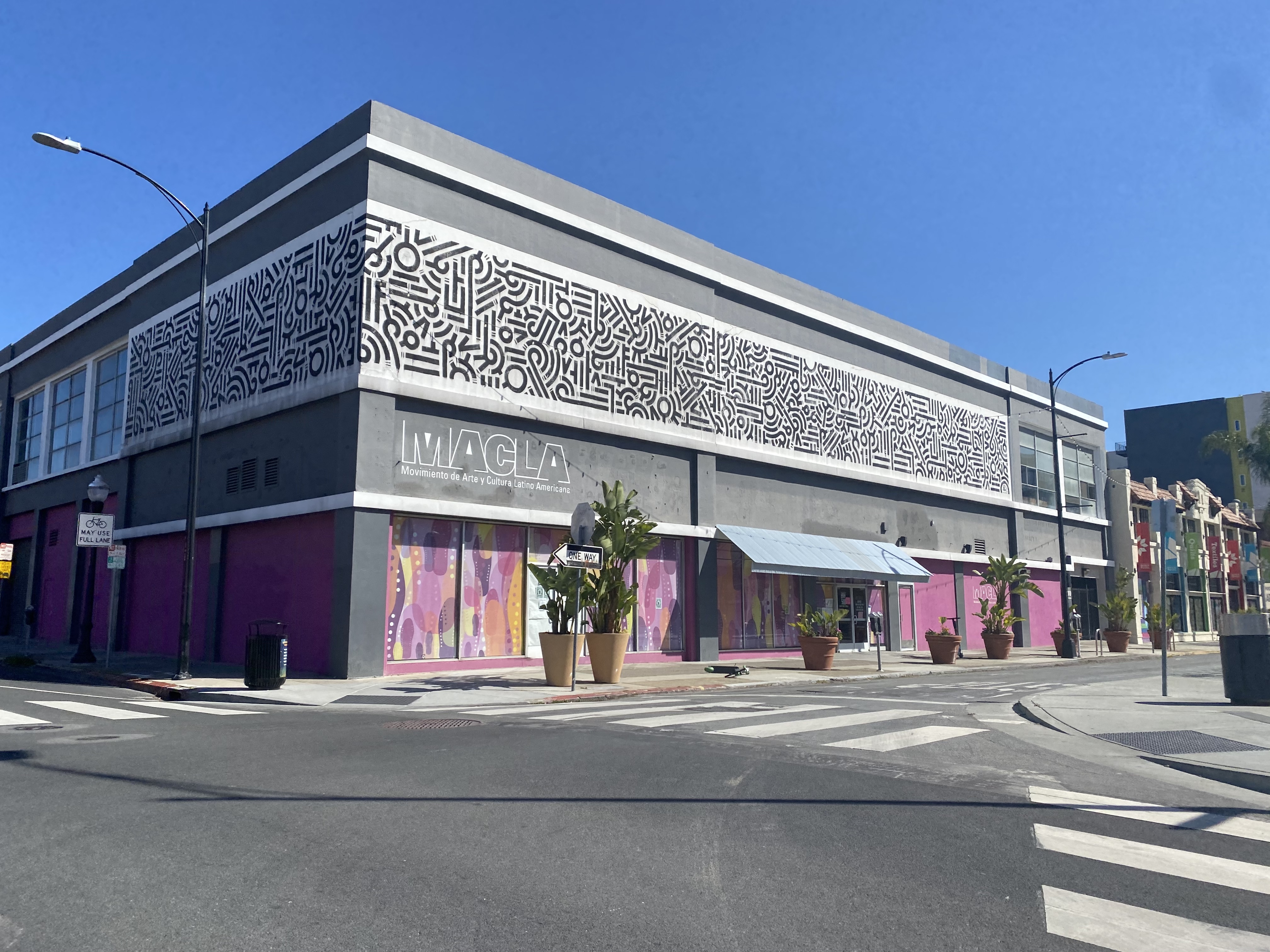
MACLA is located in the SoFA District of Downtown San Jose.

The Movimiento de Arte y Cultura Latino Americana was founded in 1989 by Maribel Alvarez, Mary Jane Solis, Rick Sajor and Eva Terrazas. They envisioned arts programming as a vehicle for civic dialogue and social equity as San José’s urban core underwent redevelopment. Alvarez, former executive director for MACLA (1996–2003), begins her historic essay of early MACLA in terms of revival of a Latino cultural center plus public debates about the identity and future of San José and Latino arts advocacy in the 1980s. For decades there was a disagreement with MACLA and the city of San Jose, the city wanted the museum to be based in the Mexican Heritage Plaza but MACLA wanted to be part of the contemporary art dialog happening in the city in the downtown area.

Between 2009 until 2013, MACLA started the process of securing grants and funds to buy their building. The building closed escrow in May 2013, which secured a future of Latinx engagement and physical space in the downtown San Jose community during gentrification. Anjee Helstrup-Alvarez has served as the executive director of MACLA since 2011 until present. A 2016 mural by artist Aaron De La Cruz is on the outside of the museum building

== Exhibitions ==
This is a list of select visual art exhibitions at MACLA, to give example of programming.

Date(s)	Exhibition name	Artist(s)	Notes
September 1997 – October 1997	Lowrider Bicycles: Art and Identity Among Mexican American Youth	Dennis Gaxiola, Marcos Gaita, Willie Galván, Angel Salvatore.	
January 2001 – March 2001	Gender, Genealogy and Counter-Memory: Remembering Latino/a Cultural Histories		Curated by Richard T. Rodriguez and Eugene Rodriguez.
September 2002 – November 2002	Ties that Bind: Exploring the Role of Intermarriage Between Latinos and Asians in Silicon Valley	Lissa Jones and Jennifer Ahn.	
November 2005 – December 2005	Intersections: Reflections of Home and Migration	Hector Dio Mendoza and some works done in collaboration with Binh Danh, and Angelica Muro.	
November 2013 – February 2014	Maize y Mas: From Mother to Monster	Yvonne Escalante, Yolanda Guerra, Fernando Mastrangelo, Viva Paredes, Jorge Rojas.	"interpretations of food and corn through themes of colonial history, personal identity, ethnicity, family, community, and even divinity".
June 2019 – August 2019	Unicorns, Aliens & Futuristic Cities: Speculative Latinidades	Javier Martinez, Jorge Gonzalez, Veronica Rojas, Michael Menchaca, Claudia Blanco, Jesus Helguera.	Curated by Joey Reyes and Maryela Perez.
December 2019 – March 2020	Our Connection To The Land	Abiam Alvarez, Arleene Correa Valencia, Karen Miranda Rivadeniera, Narciso Martinez, Suzy Gonzalez.	

== See also ==
- The Tech Museum of Innovation
- Children's Discovery Museum of San Jose
- San Jose Museum of Art
