= Sanchez Art Center =

Cultural center in Pacifica, California

- Established: 1996; 30 years ago
- Location: 1220-B Linda Mar Boulevard, Pacifica, California, 94044
- Type: nonprofit art center
- Website: www.sanchezartcenter.org

The Sanchez Art Center is a nonprofit arts organization located in Pacifica, California. It was formed in 1996 by local artists and community members.

== History ==
The Sanchez Art Center was founded in 1996 by artists and residents of Pacifica. They worked together with the city of Pacifica to lease an abandoned elementary school building which is a part of the larger Pacifica Center for the Arts complex. The Sanchez Art Center has three indoor exhibition spaces, outdoor murals, an arts classroom, and art studio spaces. It is home to the Art Guild of Pacifica.

According to their website, the mission of the Sanchez Art Center is to create community through art. PenVoice host, Dani Gasparini, says of the Sanchez "It really is a destination for San Mateo County residents." She continues, "There is a real community feel to the Sanchez Art Center [which has] been able to build this very professional structure around the community feel, so that [Sanchez Art Center] has some of the top artists wanting to come and exhibit. . ."

Significant artists exhibiting at the Sanchez, many early in their careers, include: Enrique Chagoya, Gerald Clarke, Binh Danh, Robert Hudson, Theodora Varnay Jones, Hung Liu, Bernie Lubell & Michael C. McMillen, John Mattos, Nathan Oliveira, Maria Porges, Mel Ramos, Ward Schumaker, João De Brito, M. Louise Stanley, Inez Storer, Ann Weber, and Wanxin Zhang.

== Programming ==
The Sanchez Art Center hosts several annual juried exhibitions each year. These currently include The Left Coast Annual, which artistic director Jerry Barrish says has close to a thousand submissions for an exhibition with about 70 spots and 50/50. The Center also hosts exhibitions for the Arts Guild of Pacifica as well as other Bay Area arts organizations. Solo exhibitions are produced by guest curators.

Notable arts professionals curating exhibitions for the Sanchez Art Center include: René de Guzman; Jack Fischer, Jack Fischer Gallery, San Francisco; Betti-Sue Hertz, Director of Visual Arts at Yerba Buena Center for the Arts; Susan Hillhouse, Curator, Triton Museum; Karen Kienzle, Curator, de Saisset Museum; Philip Linhares, Chief Curator, Oakland Museum of California; Maria Medua, Director, SFMOMA Artists Gallery; JoAnne Northrup, Katie and Drew Gibson Chief Curator, San Jose Museum of Art; Jack Rasmussen, Executive Director, di Rosa Preserve; Larry Rinder, Director and Chief Curator of the UC Berkeley Art Museum and Pacific Film Archive; Jan Rindfleisch, Director Emeritus, Euphrat Museum of Art; Patricia Rodriguez, Gallery Director and Curator at the Mission Cultural Center; Peter Selz, founding director of the Berkeley Art Museum; Don Soker, Don Soker Gallery, San Francisco; and Karen Tsujimoto, Senior Curator, Oakland Museum of California.

Educational programming includes art classes in local schools, workshops and summer camps. These have been funded in part by the California Arts Council.

The Sanchez Art Center is a host to Santa Cruz County’s Rydell Visual Arts Fellows Awardees’ exhibitions. The 2006 and 2007 awardees were: Beverly Rayner, Hanna Hannah, Robert Larson, William Marino. The exhibition was curated by Susan Hillhouse, Santa Cruz Museum of Art & History. The 2008 and 2009 awardees were: William “Skip” Epperson, Terri Garland, Felicia Rice, and Daniella Woolf. The exhibition was curated by Susan Hillhouse, Curator of Exhibitions and Collections, Museum of Art & History @ the McPherson Center, Santa Cruz. The 2010 and 2011 Rydell Fellowship award winners were: Andrea Borsuk, Tim Craighead, Victoria May, and Andy Ruble. The exhibition was curated by Susan Hillhouse, Santa Cruz Museum of Art & History. The 2014 and 2015 Rydell Visual Art Fellows were: Jody Alexander, Jim Denevan, and Elizabeth Stephens. The exhibition was curated by Susan Hillhouse, Santa Cruz Museum of Art & History.

The Sanchez Art Center achieved a San Mateo County Office of Sustainability Community Resilience Grant for See Change, Creating space for fear free conversation about sea level rise, a series of community engagement projects and exhibitions scheduled for early 2021.

In 2021 the Art Center hosted Extraction: Response to the Changing World Environment by the California Society of Printmakers, an exhibition which was part of the CODEX Foundation's larger Extraction: art on the edge of the abyss project.

== Pacifica Center for the Arts ==
The Pacifica Center for the Arts at 1220 Linda Mar Blvd, were former Sanchez Elementary School buildings, scheduled for demolition, near Sánchez Adobe Park. It includes these organizations:

- Sanchez Art Center, galleries and studios, a non-profit organization
- Pacifica Performances, performing arts, in the former school's multi-purpose room
- Art Guild of Pacifica, membership artwork exhibition galleries and art book library
- Stephen Johnson Photography, retail photographic gallery
