= André Gisson =

20th-century American painter

- Born: 1921; Brooklyn, New York
- Died: July 28, 2003 (aged 81–82); Atlanta, Georgia
- Known for: Painting

Mère et enfant au bord du lac painting by André Gisson. Example of the artist's impressionist brush work.

André Gisson (1921 – July 28, 2003) was an American Impressionist painter. He graduated from the Pratt Institute in New York and was a Captain in the Army during World War II.

== Life and career ==
Gisson's birth name was Anders Gittelson. Raised in poverty, he went on to graduate with an Art degree from the Pratt Institute. Gisson found difficulty breaking into the art market with his Impressionist paintings as an American. He moved to France and legally changed his name to André Gisson. After serving as a Captain in the United States Army during World War II, he continued his travels and art studies throughout Europe and Asia. A prolific painter, Gisson created hundreds of paintings throughout his lifetime. His work is in the Triton Museum of Art, and among his private collectors were President Lyndon B. Johnson and W. Somerset Maugham.

Gisson lived and worked in Westport, Connecticut for the final twenty-five years of his life. He died in Atlanta, Georgia in 2003.
