= Jan Rindfleisch =

American artist, curator, and museum director

Jan Rindfleisch (May 1, 1942 – March 8, 2025) was an American artist, educator, author, curator, and community builder. Rindfleisch is known for the programming she initiated and oversaw at the Euphrat Museum of Art; for her book on the history of art communities in the South Bay Area, Roots and Offshoots: Silicon Valley's Art Community, and for her role in documenting the careers and legacies of Agnes Pelton and Ruth Tunstall Grant.

== Education ==
Rindfleisch had a BS in Physics from Purdue University and an MFA in sculpture from San José State University.

== Career ==
=== Curator ===
Rindfleisch was the executive director of the Euphrat Museum in Cupertino, California from 1979 to 2011. At the Euphrat Rindfleisch established a history of curatorial programming that was uncommon for the time. This included the manner in which exhibitions were curated, which often involved collaboration with community members; the inclusion of community artists with established artists; and exhibition themes and content that were rare or not yet seen in art museums or art galleries. Rindfleisch's exhibition themes have included political quilts, political issues, artwork by refugees, artwork by immigrants, artwork about aging, art and technology, and the art of games.

Hank Baum states in the California Art Review, "Director Jan Rindfleisch presents exhibits that address philosophical and social issues, challenge taboos, and allow artists to be resurrected who have been obscured by the prejudice of their day."

About a 1985 exhibition, Art Collectors in and Around Silicon Valley, Cathy Curtis of the San Francisco Examiner wrote, "Provocative and timely, irreverent and unencumbered by the pompous baggage of so many art exhibits, 'Art Collectors...' is the kind of show that asks more questions than it answers." Rita Felciano noted in her review of the 1987 The Power of Cloth, "The Euphrat... puts together exhibits from the outside—events that usually have some bite to them."

In a 1984 Artweek review of Faces, Sylvie Roder stated: "Leave it to Jan Rindfleisch to come up with something special. She has taken a basic theme and treated it in complex ways."

Roder continued:

Rindfleisch is an independent-minded curator whose projects carry a strong personal stamp, in concept as well as execution. One of them, Staying Visible, dealt with the role of archives or "saved stuff" in rescuing artists from oblivion. In that exhibit, entropy was the villain and there was no doubt as to who was at the helm of the show, putting up resistance. . . Rindfleisch is oriented towards issues rather than images, and this show [Faces] is more organized around human priorities than esthetic ones. In her view, theme shows are elitist events bound by conventional rules. She prefers the term "forum show" and has turned the gallery into an arena, staging confrontations instead of merely installing pieces in passive proximity to each other. There is a quirkiness in this game, but its zest and speculative spirit are contagious."

In the 1990 book, Art Around the Bay: a guide to art galleries and museums in the San Francisco Bay Area, Paul Monaco and Murwani Davis write about The Euphrat and Rindfleisch, "The changing exhibitions attain national and international stature. Director/Curator Jan Rindfleisch aims for thought-provoking shows that conceptualize art in relation to ideas and cultural developments. Shows include "Art of the Refugee Experience," "Drawing From Experience: Artists Over 50," and a contemporary painting show called "Paintforum."

=== Author ===
Notable artists Rindfleisch has exhibited and written about, many early in their careers, include Marjorie Eaton, Mildred Howard, Agnes Pelton, Ruth Tunstall Grant, Mary Parks Washington, Connie Young Yu, Juana Alicia, Jean LaMarr, Paul Pei-Jen Hau, Flo Oy Wong, Consuelo Jimenez Underwood, and the Muwekma Ohlone people. Rindfleisch's participation in the role of securing Agnes Pelton's legacy is documented in the Phoenix Art Museum's 2019–2021 traveling exhibition and companion monograph.

=== Community advocate ===
Rindfleisch was a founding member of the alternative, performance arts space, WORKS/San José, in 1977. In 1985 she helped established the Cupertino Arts Commission. Additional civic involvement includes participating in the Getty Museum Management Institute, UC Berkeley (1989), serving as a member of the California Arts Council Visual Arts Panel (1990), the Santa Clara County Arts Council (1989–1997), San José City Hall Exhibits Committee (2006–2013), and the Arts Council Silicon Valley Local Arts Grants Review Panel (2013). Rindfleisch has acted as juror for many exhibitions and arts organizations outside of her role at the Euphrat Museum including the Sanchez Art Center, WORKS/San José and Women Eco Artists Dialog. Rindfleisch is a social justice advocate and early spokesperson on issues of inclusion and racism in the arts. She spoke on strategies of inclusion and provided frameworks to fellow arts professionals as early as 1992.

== Awards and recognition ==
Writing about Rindfleisch as a recipient of their 2014 Women of Influence Award, Silicon Valley Business Journal stated:

Jan Rindfleisch is largely responsible for keeping art in the forefront of the community in the South Bay. As Euphrat Museum of Art's executive director from 1979–2011, she rescued, developed and expanded the organization after Proposition 13 cut its sole funding in 1978.

It continued,

She formed an energetic partnership between De Anza College, the museum and the community, and developed the award-winning Euphrat Arts & Schools Program that provides more than 30,000 student instruction hours annually. She curated more than 100 thought-provoking, cross-disciplinary exhibits, presented untold stories (from Angel Island to the loss of Native American languages), and has developed art exhibition programs for academic, civic, corporate and school sites.

Presenting The Civic Service Award in Cultural Arts from the City of Cupertino to Rindfleisch in 1988, Councilmember Phil N. Johnson stated, "Jan has helped to bring our fine arts programs to one of the highest levels you can achieve..."

Rindfleisch has also received the following: Arts Council Silicon Valley's Arts & Business Arts Leadership Award; Santa Clara County Woman of Achievement (1989), Sunnyvale Chamber of Commerce Leadership Vision Award in the Arts (1993), and the Asian Heritage Council Arts Award (1988).

== Selected publications ==
- Staying Visible, The Importance of Archives. Introductory essay, Jan Rindfleisch, produced in conjunction with Euphrat Museum of Art. 1981.
- "Computers and Art," in CADRE 84. Marcia Chamberlain, ed. San Jose State University Art Department, San Jose, California. 1983.
- Content Art, Contemporary Issues. Rindfleisch, Jan, curator Cupertino, CA: Euphrat Gallery, De Anza College, 1985.
- The First San Jose Biennial, San Jose Museum of Art. San Jose, California, 1986. ISBN 0938175009
- "Women, Politics and Quilts" in Beyond Power: A Celebration. Southern Exposure Gallery, San Francisco, California. 1987.
- "Symbolic Rituals" in Irregular Gazette. San Jose State University Art Department, San Jose, California. Fall 1987.
- Art of the Refugee Experience. Rindfleisch, Jan, Cupertino, CA: Euphrat Gallery, 1988.
- Coming Across: Art by Recent Immigrants. Rindfleisch, Jan, ed. Cupertino, CA: Euphrat Museum of Art, 1994. ISBN 1886215006
- HEARTWORK: Creating Something Together, Collaborating organizations included Artship Foundation, Augustino Dance Theater, and Indian Canyon Ranch/Costanoan Indian Research, Inc. Produced and edited by Jan Rindfleisch. Curators: Jan Rindfleisch with Diana Argabrite and Slobodan Dan Paich. 1996.
- Roots and Offshoots: Silicon Valley's Arts Community, Rindfleisch, Jan; Maribel Alvarez; Raj Jayadev, edited by Nancy Hom and Ann Sherman, Santa Clara, CA: Ginger Press, 2017. ISBN 9780998308401
- Creative Power: the Art and Activism of Ruth Tunstall Grant, Jan Rindfleisch with Barbara Goldstein, essay by Lizzetta Lefalle-Collins, Santa Clara, CA: Ginger Press, 2019. ISBN 9780998308425
- The Art of Jean La Marr, Essay by Ann M. Wolfe. Contributions from Allan L. Edmunds, Mary Lee Fulkerson, Debra Harry, PhD., Archana Hortsing, Lucy R. Lippard, Susan Lobo, Ph.D., Judith Lowry, Malcolm Margolin, Vincent Medina, Anya Montiel, Ph.D., Raymond Patlan, Jan Rindfleisch. Reno, Nevada: Nevada Museum of Art, 2020. ISBN 978-0-9658115-6-9.
- "Staying Visible: How a Small-Town Couple Boosted Agnes Pelton’s Star" in California Desert Art, Japenga, Ann, ed. California, 2022.
- "From a Thrift Store to the Whitney—Making the Ignored Visible" in Entanglements: A curated collection of contemporary culture, Wylde, Nanette, ed., CA: Hunger Button Books, 2022. ISBN 978-1-936083-20-6
- Building Together, Rindfleisch, Jan; with Ann Sherman, Nancy Hom, and essay by Karen Tseng. Santa Clara, CA: Ginger Press, 2024. ISBN 979-8-218-98755-8

== Archives ==
Rindfleisch's archives are held in part at the Martin Luther King Jr. Library at San Jose State University.
