= Angelica Muro =

American artist, educator (born 1977)

Angelica Muro (born 1977) is an American multimedia artist, curator, and art educator. Muro is the Chair of the Department of Visual and Public Art and Assistant Professor of Integrated Media and Photography in the Department of Visual and Public Art at California State University, Monterey Bay.

== Life and career ==
Muro was born in 1977 and raised in the Central Valley agricultural community of Hopeton, California. She received a Bachelor of Arts (BA) degree in photography from San Jose State University, and a Master of Fine Arts (MFA) degree in 2005 from Mills College.

Muro situates her artwork within a complex dialogue about contemporary political, social, and cultural issues. Muro herself focuses on the complexities of the ecosystem–the spectrum of productivity, exploitation, and the distribution of wealth–that relates to issues of gender, race, and class. Through her art, Muro attempts to engage in and address contemporary social and cultural issues brought about by consumerism, and often contrasts images of wealth with those of hardship. Her most well known work includes Club Lido: Wild Eyes, Occasional Dreams, and Packing Heat. She has made significant contributions to collaborative projects, including Public Space, Space 47 Projects, Chafismo: New Artforms of Art Post-Raquachismo, and Artists for Democracy 2024.

Packing Heat is a multimedia installation inspired by female representations in Mexican Cinema, consisting of photographs, drawing, and sculptural elements that reference the female action heroine as femme fatale - openly playing into the "new math" of post-feminism, equating attractiveness with self-empowerment. These images evoke cinematic expressions and allegories that imply a culture of fear while paradoxically indulging romantic notions of gender empowerment, violence, and equalization.

A Guide for Agricultural Workers Series: Using drawings and photographs, Muro examines agribusiness exploitation of farmworkers through unsafe pesticide handling policies and practices. As a tool of discourse, this work utilizes a pamphlet provided by the Environmental Protection Agency to farm workers to advise them on pesticides. Written in Spanish, the pamphlet uses cartoon characters that appeal to common stereotypes and overly simplistic language to patronize farmworkers who ironically have a deep understanding of the negative effects of pesticide debris on their communities. Her reproductions of these drawings place the illustrations in a different context, inviting the viewer to contemplate the pamphlet designer's demeaning and unbridled choice of images and text. Agricultural Workers in Gucci is an archival pigment print featuring a three-piece drawing that depicts field workers eating lunch. One female worker is depicted wearing Gucci heels and carrying a matching purse, contrasting with the black-and-white portrayal of the workers. The background features colorful, intricately detailed flowers. The juxtaposition of high fashion with agricultural labor has been interpreted as a commentary on socioeconomic status and the conditions faced by field workers.

Untitled (Club Lido), in collaboration with Juan Luna-Avin, depicts the downtown San Jose subcultures at Lido Night Club. While San Jose has large Vietnamese and Mexican populations, these two groups rarely interact. At Lido Night Club, however, Vietnamese performers entertain weekend crowds, while club-goers dance to Mexican banda music. The split-level structure of the nightclub contains a Mexican cantina downstairs and a Vietnamese ballroom dancing club upstairs, and is a rare example of a location in San Jose where the two minority cultures directly interact. The club has also become the epicenter of a growing Latin transgender community in San Jose. In their drawings and installation, Muro & Luna-Avin explore and celebrate the unexpected subcultures present in San Jose.

== Career ==
- Served as Gallery Coordinator for WORKS San José for five years
- Educational Programmer for Movimiento de Arte y Cultura Latino Americana (MACLA, San José, California) for three years
- Principal and co-founder of Public Space/Chinatown and the director of the Visual and Public Art Gallery @CSUMB
