= Parque de los Pobladores =

Park in San Jose, California, United States

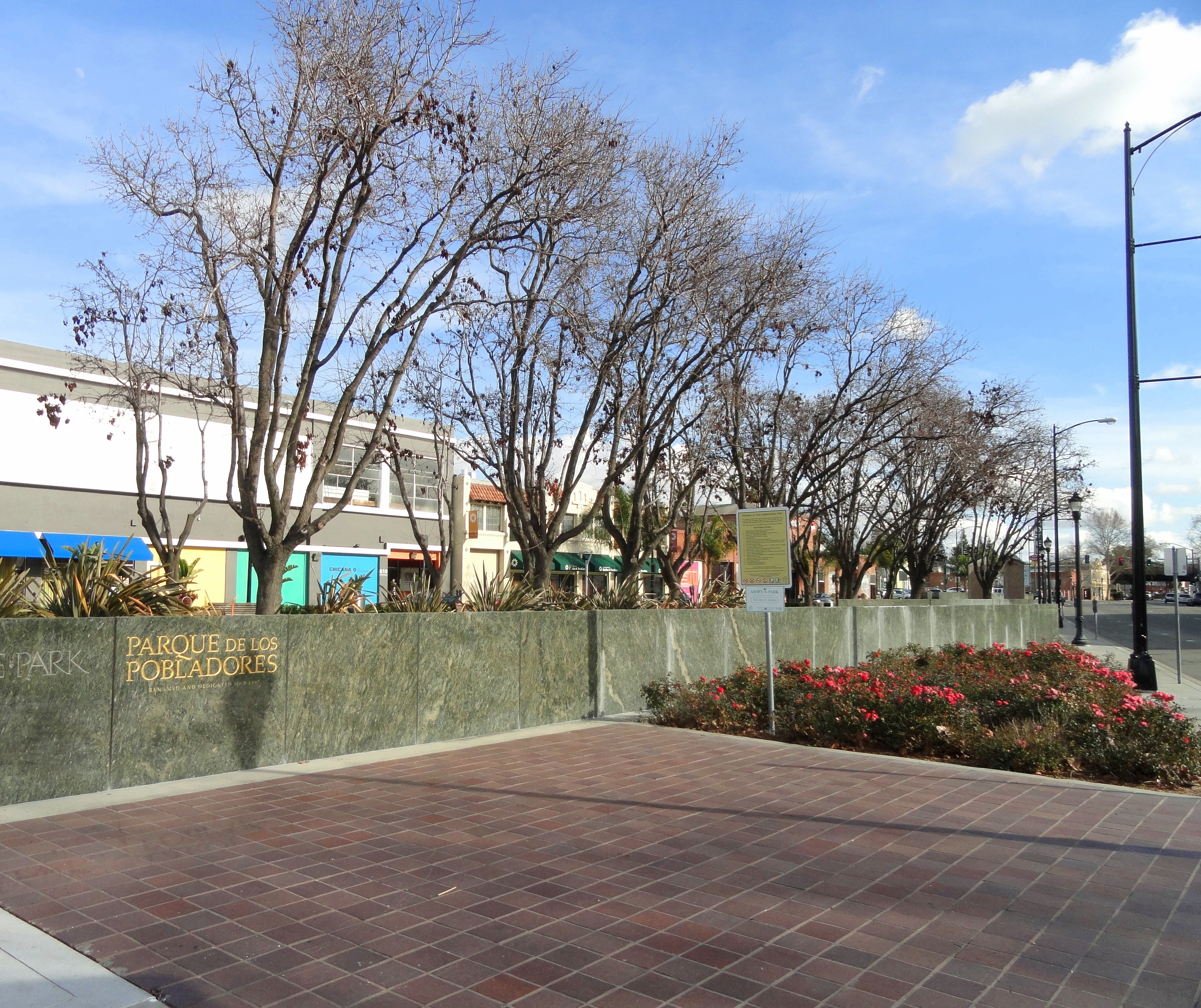
- Interactive map of Parque de los Pobladores
- Location: San Jose, California
- Coordinates: 37.3523°N 121.8845°W
- Area: .2 acres (0.081 ha)

Parque de los Pobladores is a park in the SoFA District of Downtown San Jose, California.

== History ==
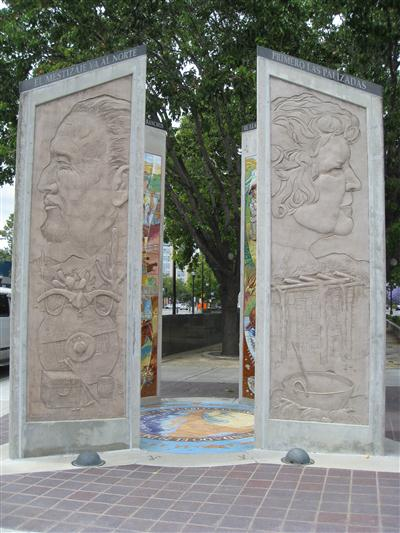
The Monument to the Founding of the Pueblo de San José de Guadalupe.

In 1997, the Monument to the Founding of the Pueblo de San José de Guadalupe was erected in the park. The monument, designed by the East Los Streetscapers, commemorates the city's founders that came on Anza Expedition of 1776 that established the city as the California's first civilian settlement.

The park was redeveloped in 2012 to its current state, as part of the city's Pavement to Plaza program.

In 2017, an art installation called "Urban Rooms" was installed at the park, designed by Estudio Teddy Cruz + Forman.

== Location ==
Parque de los Pobladores is located at the heart of the SoFA District of Downtown San Jose, at the intersection of Market Street and South 1st Street.
