= Maria Porges =

American artist and writer

- Born: 1954 (age 71–72); Oakland, California, United States
- Education: University of Chicago, Yale University
- Known for: Sculpture, assemblage, drawing, writing, criticism
- Spouse: William McMahon
- Awards: SFMOMA SECA Award, California Arts Council, College Art Association of America
- Website: Maria Porges

Maria Porges (born 1954) is an American artist and writer based in the San Francisco Bay Area. As an artist she is known for the prominent use of text in her visual works, which encompass sculpture, works on paper and assemblage and have an epistemological bent. As a critic Porges has written for Artforum, Art in America, Sculpture and SquareCylinder, among other publications.

Maria Porges, Natural Magic: Cures for Modern Maladies, wax wood, metal leaf, 30" x 46" x 7", 2000.

Porges is best known for the curiously labeled wax bottle sculptures she created throughout the 1990s and early oughts, together with the tools and weapons fashioned from books that appear throughout her career. The work is considered to be provocative in its method of inquiry and redefinition of artistic syntax. According to critic Sarah S. King of Art in America, "[Porges] invites viewers to focus their attention on the paradoxical relationships between empirical and subjective systems of interpretation through clever juxtapositions of objects, images and words."

Porges's work belongs to the collections of the San Francisco Museum of Modern Art (SFMOMA), Berkeley Art Museum and Pacific Film Archive and Oakland Museum of California. She has exhibited at SFMOMA, the deYoung Museum and Aldrich Contemporary Art Museum, among other venues. Porges lives in Oakland and is a professor at the California College of the Arts.

== Education and career ==
Porges was born in 1954 in Oakland, California. She studied art at Yale University and University of Chicago, earning a BA and MFA, respectively.

In her early career, she had solo exhibitions at SFMOMA (1992) and alternative spaces such as Southern Exposure, SF Camerawork and Intersection for the Arts. Subsequent solo exhibitions took place at the di Rosa Center for Contemporary Art (2008) and Sanchez Art Center (2016), and galleries such as John Berggruen (1995–2003), Seager Gray (2016) and Fourth Wall (2023, retrospective) in the Bay Area, David Beitzel Gallery (2000) and Littlejohn Contemporary (2003) in New York, James Harris (2001, Seattle) and Carrie Secrist (2003, Chicago). Her work has appeared in surveys at White Columns, SFMOMA, the deYoung Museum, Oakland Museum of California, Aldrich Museum and Monterey Museum of Art, among others.

== Work and reception ==
Porges is known for featuring text in her artworks, often in semiotic counterpoint to commonplace objects. Her assemblage and collage pieces employ actual objects while her drawings and sculptures reference them. The text takes a variety of forms and lengths, appearing variously as labels affixed to forms, captions with drawings, and blocks of text partially obscured by surface cuts and folds or by thickly sculpted glass. Wordplay features prominently in some of the works, for example as words embedded within other words or in the use of binary pairs. Certain themes are recurrent, including history, time, science, magic, weaponry and child psychology.

Art observers have characterized Porges' work as philosophical and Dadaistic in its approach, as its charged juxtaposition of text and imagery raises questions about meaning and how it is made. The subjective ambiguity of the artist's texts contrasts with the tangible and conventional elements of her visuals to uncanny effect. Kathleen Whitney of Sculpture wrote, "Porges places a verbal proposition in contention with the mechanics of visual communication in a way that confounds both… Involved with creating meaning through association and context, her work questions basic expectations of the role art serves."

Noted influences on the artist include anthropologist Claude Levi-Strauss and artists Claes Oldenburg and René Magritte. The often surrealist character of Porges' work extends beyond visual elements to the incorporated text, with critic David M. Roth describing Porges as a "meta-fabulist," whose mid-career artwork evokes "a fusion of Max Ernst and Dick and Jane." Commentators also draw parallels to the text and imagery of the iconic children's book, Alice in Wonderland. Childhood is a prominent theme in Porges' oeuvre, and similar to Alice, Porges' children are innocents beset by ogres, villains and a latent sense of threat. The artist's child-themed work is reported to be influenced by her experiences both as a mother of twin daughters and as a child of supportive but cerebral parents.

Maria Porges, Squeeze, hot sculpted glass with wall text, 12" tall, 1993–2001.

Porges' artworks vary widely in their aesthetic approach. Reviewers characterize her bottle sculptures as possessing a formal sensibility akin to the still lives of Giorgio Morandi, while noting a marked aesthetic contrast with other works—including some concurrently developed—which they describe as more "enigmatic" and "less mediated." Still other of her series channel pop art in their vintage comic styling.

=== Earlier work: 1988–2009 ===
Porges began receiving critical attention in the late 1980s. Early works were largely assemblages, several of which featured text in conjunction with tools. The Tools of Knowledge (1988) featured axe handles bearing books as blades. The books were sculpted into wedge shapes and partly retained their covers, revealing their former roles as dictionary and political tome. Old Saws (1990) featured common proverbs inscribed on a group of rusty saws that were hung from the gallery ceiling. Books and tools—especially tools with weapon-like qualities—are recurrent motifs in Porges' work.

In the 1990s, Porges pursued an interest in casting and began creating objects in bronze, glass and wax. In 1995 she created the sculpture Witness, an open glass book atop a steel bookstand with the word "thought" etched into a glass shelf below. Squeeze (1993–2001), an hourglass shaped object in hot sculpted glass, explores a scientific principle called "the observer effect," distorting the text mounted on a wall behind as viewers try to read it. Other cast works featured bronze relief drapery samples and oversized hands in various materials and settings that were based on fragments and gestures from art-historical paintings.

Around this time, Porges developed a predilection for working with wax and began creating the cast wax bottle sculptures for which she became widely known. Appearing in groups, the bottles bore thought-provoking labels and evoked apothecary medicines in their arrangement on shelves and in cabinets. Those that appeared in her 2000 show "Miraculous Vessels" were described by New York Times critic Ken Johnson as "poetic" and "metaphysical," suggesting such impalpable contents as "Youth With Wisdom," and "Solitude Without Loneliness." In similar fashion, her 1999 sculpture Natural Magic: Cures for Modern Maladies features a miscellaneous assortment of bottles with intangible labels such as "For Compassion Fatigue" and "To Relieve Boredom." The bottles are grayscale in tone save for a small red one marked "Drink Me." Her satirical piece Acts of (Self) Deception (2000) critiques the hyperbolic use of language with imaginary bottle contents that include "The Science of Square Dancing" and "The Art of Point-of-Purchase Packaging."

Concurrent with her cast creations, Porges produced other artwork that critics describe as aesthetically less formal. One such work is Porges' 1997 piece Telling Time, a functioning clock that cycles through historical events—genocide, peace, famine—in place of numbers.

Porges' 2003 exhibition, "Bombast," was a thematic exploration of explosives which appeared in a variety of materials and forms. Some of the pieces echoed her bottle works, placing labeled objects—this time sculpted bombs—on shelves in careful composition. Others—such as Molotov Museum I, an improvised-bomb wall clock of sorts—recalled her earlier found-object assemblages. Bomboozle (2003) introduced a new medium—felted wool—in the form of stuffed knit bombs.

Her 2008 show "After the Age of Reason" presented drawings and sculptures cast in a variety of materials, including wax, bronze, and lead crystal. Together, the works formed a Baroque-inspired narrative involving books, girls in large wigs and sculpted heads of children, which explored the Enlightenment and its deleterious effects in the west and themes of parenting, childhood, education and knowledge.

=== Later work: 2010–present ===
Maria Porges, "Mashups," clay, dimensions variable, 2020.

After exhibiting a 15-year survey of her works in wax, Porges turned to other forms. Her 2016 exhibition at Seager Gray gallery introduced two new series, "Shortest Stories"—a collection of collages, sculptures and brief original writings—and "Exhortations"—a continuation of Porges' book-tools motif in the form of wall-mounted sculptures. Both series feature book fragments sliced at sharp angles to create forms that are vaguely weapon-like and threatening. Critic David M. Roth called the "Stories" pieces "unsettling adult fairy tales" whose "Dadaistic logic treats the line between adulthood and childhood as a permeable membrane." Porges' "Exhortations" appeared as two-word imperatives—"Calm Calamitously," "Harm Charmingly"—debossed on the surface of each piece.

Other work explored a "words within words" motif, including (C)hair (2012)—a drawing of an antique chair constructed of hair—and F(r)iction (2016)—a series of words that uses book slices to call attention to other words contained in each. Her post-2020 "Mashup" series consists of protuberant ceramic figures and dense drawings in black and white. It features bulbous forms that combine design elements from disparate cultures, including Gaelic, Chinese and Native American southwest. The works appeared in her 35-year retrospective and were characterized as "provocative and inquiring" by art critic Renny Pritikin.

== Writing and teaching ==
Porges has been a writer and art critic for over thirty-five years. Her critical writing has been published in Artforum, Sculpture, Art in America, Artweek, American Craft, The New York Times Book Review, Hyperallergic and SquareCylinder, among other publications. She has written numerous catalogue and book essays, for galleries, artists and institutions such as the San Francisco Museum of Craft + Design, Sonoma Valley Museum of Art, Nevada Museum of Art and De Saisset Museum, and created audio tour scripts for museum exhibitions across the United States.

Porges is a professor at California College of the Arts, teaching in the graduate programs in Fine Arts and Visual and Critical Studies and the undergraduate Fine Arts program. She has also taught at the San Francisco Art Institute, University of California, Berkeley, Stanford University and Pilchuck Glass School, among other institutions. In 2024, the College Art Association of America (CAA) named Porges the recipient of that year's CAA Distinguished Teaching of Art Award.

== Collections and recognition ==
Porges’s work belongs to the public art collections of the Berkeley Art Museum and Pacific Film Archive, di Rosa Center for Contemporary Art, Monterey Museum of Art, Oakland Museum of California, SFMOMA, San Jose Museum of Art, Scottsdale Museum of Contemporary Art and Yale University Art Gallery, among others.

She has been recognized with a SECA Art Award (Society for the Encouragement of Contemporary Art) from SFMOMA (1992), grants from the California Arts Council (1990) and Center for Cultural Innovation (2014), and the 2024 College Art Association Distinguished Teaching of Art Award. She has received artist residencies from the Headlands Center for the Arts, Pilchuck Glass School and Kala Art Institute.
