= João de Brito =

Portuguese and American artist (born 1958)

João de Brito, commonly written as Joao De Brito (born 1958), is a Portuguese and American painter. He has lived in Northern California since 1978, and travels extensively throughout the United States and Europe to paint in oils en plein air. From age 6, he has observed and studied art to acquire a passion for expressing himself using impressionist/figurative views on canvas.

== Life and career ==
João de Brito was born in Vila Franca do Campo, São Miguel Island in the Azores, Portugal and as a young boy immigrated with his family to the East Coast of the United States. In 1978, the artist settled on California’s Monterey Peninsula where he shares his talents with the local community as well as international art enthusiasts. Though he admits to often ‘swimming against the current', his painting philosophy is to awaken hope, invoke a sense of well-being and share colors of life, de Brito is content to quietly observe nature and to allow his images to speak to the human heart.

Though de Brito sculpts and works in ceramic, he favors painting and incorporates his Portuguese roots along with influences of great French fauvists and California impressionists. In previous years, de Brito traveled to New Zealand to paint with Māori artists.

de Brito has become well known for his use of vibrant colors that elicit light, life, energy and interpretive landscapes. His work is inspired by memories of his homeland, scenes from his many travels abroad. de Brito’s oils stimulate the sense of sight to produce emotion and thought. As a result, de Brito’s works appear in galleries, museums, businesses, government agencies and affluent homes around the world.

Along the way, he has had many solo exhibits, he's also been member of several art's organizations, the Santa Cruz Art League, Art Association and Museum, and the Beachcombers Club in Provincetown. Joao de Brito’s works have been found in exhibitions at Kate Nolan's Many Hands Gallery in Santa Cruz, California; Thanassi Gallery in Provincetown, Massachusetts; Monique Arnon Fine Arts Gallery in San Francisco; the Hauk Fine Art Gallery in Pacific Grove, California; and the Santa Cruz Art Center Gallery, in Santa Cruz, the Foundry Gallery, Berkeley and the Woodside Gallery, Woodside, California..

De Brito was part of the group exhibition, Ashes to Life: A Portuguese American Story in Art (2008), at the Sanchez Art Center in Pacifica, California, the other artists included Nathan Oliveira, Mel Ramos, and John Mattos. A separate book by the same name was published for the exhibit with interviews with all four artist.

== Memberships ==
The Beachcombers Provincetown, Santa Cruz Art League, Provincetown Art Association and Museum

== Publications ==
- Brito, Joao (2003). "Colors of Life", 24.
