= Morgan Horse (sculpture) =

1966 public artwork by Sascha Stanislav Schnittmann

Coordinates: 37.3561082°N 121.9552176°W

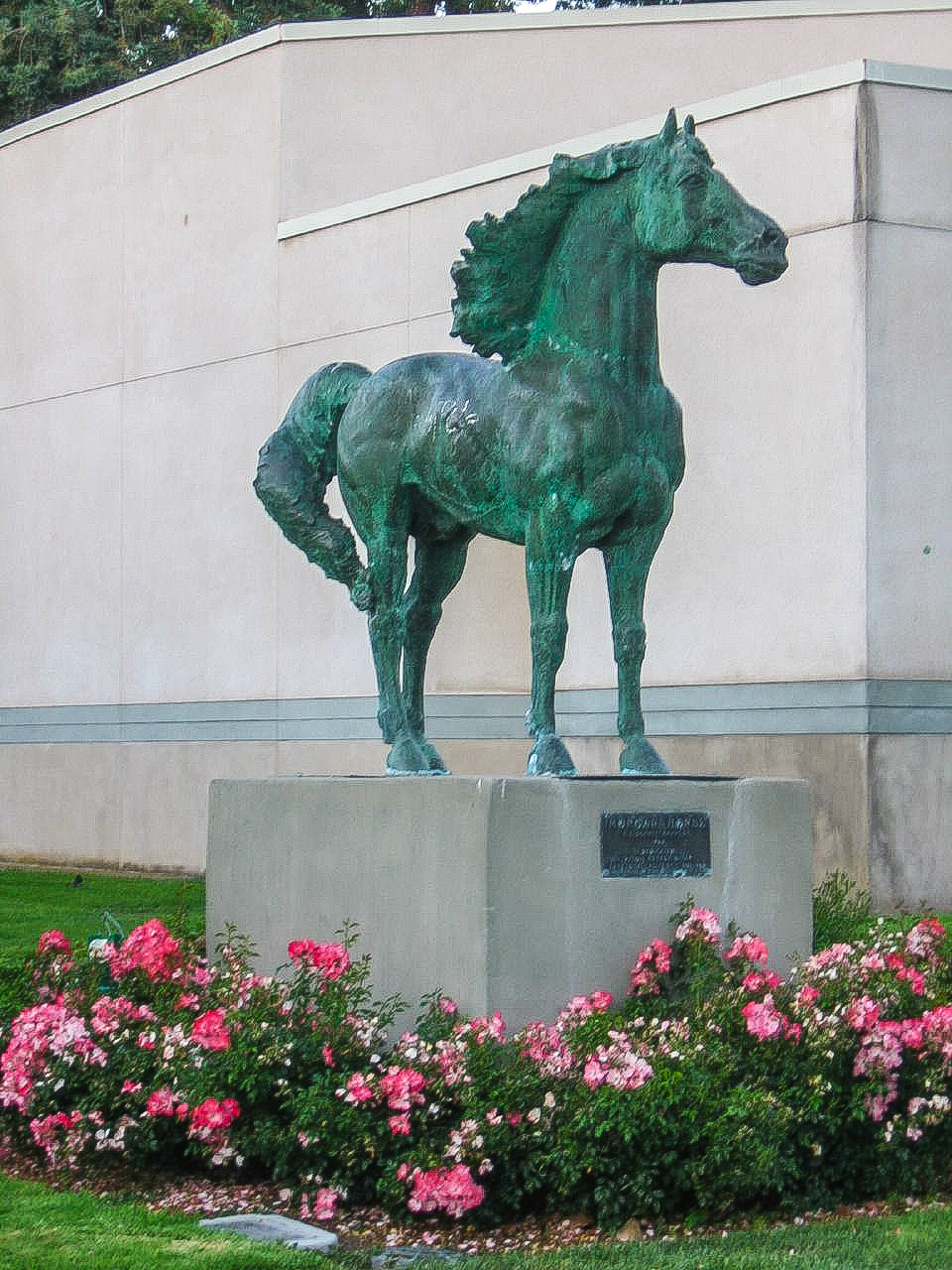
- Sculpture in 2007
- Artist: Alexandrovich “Sascha” Stanislav Schnittmann
- Year: 1966
- Type: Bronze sculpture
- Dimensions: 2.1 m (7 ft)
- Location: Santa Clara, California, U.S.

Morgan Horse is a public artwork by artist Alexandrovich “Sascha” Stanislav Schnittmann, located in front of the Triton Museum of Art, in Santa Clara, California.

== History ==
The sculpture was commissioned by Robert Morgan, a prominent breeder of Morgan horses. Robert Morgan had established the Triton Museum, named after his favorite horse, Triton. The sculpture is a depiction of this horse.

Morgan Horse was originally located at the Triton Museum of Art in San Jose. The Triton Museum was relocated to its present location in Santa Clara, and the sculpture was moved to its current site in front of the Museum (year unknown).

The artist Sascha Alexandrovich Stanislav Schnittmann (1913–1978) was born in New York. Other works of Schnittmann include the bronze bust of Count Casimir Pulaski (1961) in Little Rock, Arkansas.
