= WORKS San José =

Cultural center in San Jose, California

WORKS/San José
- Formation: 1977; 48 years ago
- Type: nonprofit art center
- Location: 38 S Second St, San Jose, California, 95113
- Website: workssanjose.org

WORKS/San José is a nonprofit, member-run community art space, located in the Downtown Historic District of San Jose, California. It was founded in 1977 by community members.

== History ==
WORKS/San José began in October 1977, by a group of artists and San Jose State University faculty and students in downtown San Jose. Early members of WORKS/San José include: Tony May, Erin Goodwin Guerrero, Ruth Tunstall Grant, Jan Rindfleisch, George Rivera, Rebecca Schapp, Anna Koster, Fred Shepard, Albert Dixon.

WORKS/San José was originally an offshoot of the short lived MERZ gallery and Wordworks, started by Jessica Jacobs, the then San Jose State University gallery director. Jacobs was instrumental in the establishment of the nonprofit status and acquisition of the initial space. When Jacobs left WORKS/San José, the organization structure changed towards a more democratic approach. Gallery operations are run by member volunteers. San Jose State University art professor Tony May became the first president of the board of directors.

WORKS has occupied many locations in downtown San Jose including at Vine and Auzerais Streets (from 1977 to 1985); the Leticia Building at 66 South First Street (from 1985 to 1990); a warehouse space at 260 Jackson Street in Japantown (from 1990 to 1996); the Sperry Flour Building at 30 North Third Street (from 1997 to 2007); 451 South First Street (from 2007 to 2011); 365 South Market Street (from 2011 to 2022). The gallery was moved to the historic 38 South Second Street location in 2022.

== Exhibitions and work ==
Notable artists showing at WORKS/San José, many early in their career, include Laurie Anderson, Binh Danh, Jim Campbell, Annie Sprinkle, Alan Rath , Lynn Hershman Leeson, Holly Lane, Mark Pauline of Survival Research Laboratories, Malaquis Montoya, Ed Osborn, Yolanda Lopez, and Linda Montano.

Throughout its history, WORKS/San José has presented performance art, music, film, theater, spoken word, visual and conceptual art, workshops, panels, and lectures. Most exhibitions are produced by guest curators from the community.
