= Ruth Tunstall Grant =

American painter (1945–2017)

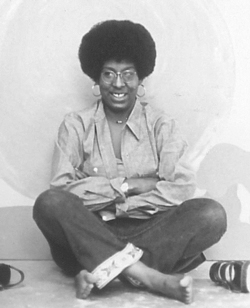
- Tunstall Grant c. 1960s.
- Born: January 23, 1945; Boulder, Colorado
- Died: June 5, 2017 (aged 72); San Jose, California
- Occupations: Artist, Art Educator, Activist
- Years active: 1966–2017
- Spouse: Duncan Chadwick Grant
- Children: Sheehan Grant

Ruth Tunstall Grant (1945–2017) was an African American artist, educator and activist in the San Francisco Bay Area known for her paintings, community activism, and arts advocacy. Her work has been featured in many invitational group exhibitions as well as solo shows at national and international venues such as Dallas Museum of Fine Art, Dallas, Texas; Rath Museum, Geneva, Switzerland; Triton Museum of Art, Santa Clara, California; San Jose Museum of Art, San Jose, California; and Los Gatos Museum of Art, Los Gatos, California. She had a strong focus on community service and advocacy of children’s rights and social justice in and beyond Santa Clara County. She established innovative, ongoing arts programs and inspired creative activists such as Marita Dingus.

== Early life and education ==
Ruth Tunstall Grant was born to Dr. Lucille Hawkins Tunstall and E. H. Tunstall in Boulder, Colorado in 1945. Her mother was one of the first black women leads of virology at the CDC. Her father was a Tuskegee Airman. Among Grant's early memories include visits to the Detroit Institute of Art. "Her mother, a busy academic, often worked on weekends and dropped Tunstall Grant and her sister off at the Detroit Institute of Art on her way to work. The girls wandered through the collections for hours, overseen by the museum guards who recognized them from their frequent weekend visits. These museum experiences primed Tunstall Grant’s pursuit of art in college.”

She received a professional certificate from the Detroit Society of Arts & Crafts Arts School in Detroit in 1965, and an Associate Degree in Art from Delta College, University Center in 1966. She earned her Bachelor of Fine Arts Degree in Painting and Master of Fine Arts Degree in Painting from the University of Dallas Irving (1969, 1970).

As an undergraduate in 1969, New York curator Henri Ghent included her in Ten Afro-American Artists, an exhibition of paintings and drawings at Mount Holyoke College. The following year she was awarded an art scholarship to Italy.

== Career ==
Tunstall Grant’s artistic vision and style evolved through her unceasing curiosity and exploration of contemporary content and new media. Independent curator and writer Lizzetta LeFalle-Collins has traced the artist’s development from acrylic painting, watercolor, collage to public art. In discussing Tunstall Grant’s paintings, LeFalle-Collins states “cosmic compositions” and “observant naturescapes” displaying her “female agency” reflected the times.

Early exhibitions included exhibition with catalog, Eight Afro-American Artists, 1971, Musée Rath, Geneva, Switzerland and Four Moderns, 1972, Brooklyn Museum, New York, reviewed in the New York Times. In 1976 she was reviewed by New York curator Henri Ghent.

She moved to Davis, California in 1971, and then in 1975 to San Jose, California where most of Tunstall Grant’s art and activist life took place.

== Community and arts advocacy ==
Tunstall Grant was a major leader to rethink the South Bay art scene in the late 1970s and 1980s, just as Silicon Valley tech advances were taking off. Tunstall Grant served as teacher and director of the museum art school at the San Jose Museum of Art, San Jose, California from 1976–1988, starting art programs in about a dozen schools, including those in struggling neighborhoods—as she stated, “the first outreach program ever for the museum." She led the charge on bringing arts education for San Jose’s underserved schools and worked to introduce an art program at the Santa Clara County Children’s Shelter—just two of the many initiatives she fostered in her lifetime.

In 1984, as an Arts Council Santa Clara County board member, she started Hands on the Arts, an annual festival in Sunnyvale, California. In 1987, she was awarded Santa Clara County Woman of Achievement Award. Judge LaDoris Hazzard Cordell (ret.) gave the keynote. Hazzard Cordell lauds Tunstall Grant's impact, which ultimately brought children’s artwork and collaborative projects into county courtrooms and social service offices.

In 1989, with others, Tunstall Grant started Genesis, Sanctuary for the Arts, at the first of three locations in San Jose, combining art studios, art exhibitions and interdisciplinary events. Performers included jazz violinist India Cooke and U.S. Poet Laureate Juan Felipe Herrera.

Tunstall Grand served as director of the Santa Clara County’s Children’s Shelter Arts Program from 1992–2009.

In 2003 she was appointed to the San Jose Art Commission.

As a San Jose arts commissioner, Tunstall Grant began and led the exhibition program (2006–2012) for the new San Jose City Hall. The first exhibition was Hidden Heritage going back to the city’s African American leaders in the late 1800s. Artist collaborators included Joyce McEwen Crawford and Mary Parks Washington.

Tunstall Grant collaborated on Japantown Mural Project, 2012–2013, a community project by Rasteroids Design and the City of San Jose Public Art Program to celebrate an historic neighborhood, once one of San Jose’s first Chinatown settlements known as “Heinlenville.”

Ruth Tunstall Grant was an acclaimed artist, activist, and educator whose influence continues to be felt in the artistic and civic community of the South Bay Area and beyond. Her service and advocacy for the arts and youth inspired many creative activists and laid a foundation for Silicon Valley’s activism and growth. Tunstall Grant derived strength from family and cross-cultural friendships, honored their experiences and training, and continually built bridges.

== Collections and archives ==
Her paintings are in the collections of the de Saisset Museum, Santa Clara University, Santa Clara, California; the San Jose Museum of Art; the Triton Museum, Santa Clara, California; the University of Dallas; and the African American Museum of Dallas.

The African American Museum and Library at Oakland (AAMLO) has Tunstall Grant's papers and electronic archives.

== Awards and recognition ==
She received a 1987 Santa Clara County’s Woman of Achievement Award in the Arts.

She was presented an Alain Locke Award for Excellence in the Arts in 1999 from the Detroit Institute of Arts, Detroit, Michigan.

The Children’s Shelter of Santa Clara County, a program that provided fine art instruction for abused and abandoned children of which Tunstall Grant was founder and director, received the EA Taller Award for the Art Education Program.

Her artworks have appeared in the following publications: Art International Magazine, The Bay City Times, The New York Times, The Sacramento Bee, New York Amsterdam News, The San Jose Mercury News, Metro, and Afro-American Artist.

== Solo exhibitions ==
Her work has been featured in many invitational group exhibitions as well as solo shows at national and international venues such as:

- Haggerty Gallery, University of Dallas, Irving, Texas, 1970
- Davis Art Center, Davis, California,1972
- UC Davis’s Memorial Art Gallery, Davis, California,1972
- Clark College, Atlanta, 1976
- Ruth Tunstall Grant: Works on Paper, San Jose Museum of Art, San Jose, California, 1981
- Seipp Gallery, Castilleja School, Palo Alto, California, 1983
- Allegra Gallery, San Jose, California, 1985
- Allegra Gallery, San Jose, California, 1986
- Ruth Tunstall Grant: Dream Dancers, San Jose City College, San Jose, California, 1999
- A Journey, Los Gatos Museum of Art and Natural History, Los Gatos, California, 1999
- Ruth Tunstall Grant: Repeated Redirections, Triton Museum of Art, Santa Clara, California, 2000
- Cross Roads, Joyce Gordon Gallery, Oakland, California, 2010
- Ruth Tunstall Grant, Bay Area Collections, San Jose City College Art Gallery, 2018
- Ruth Tunstall Grant, Triton Museum of Art, Santa Clara, California, 2019
