= Mel Ramos =

American painter (1935 – 2018)

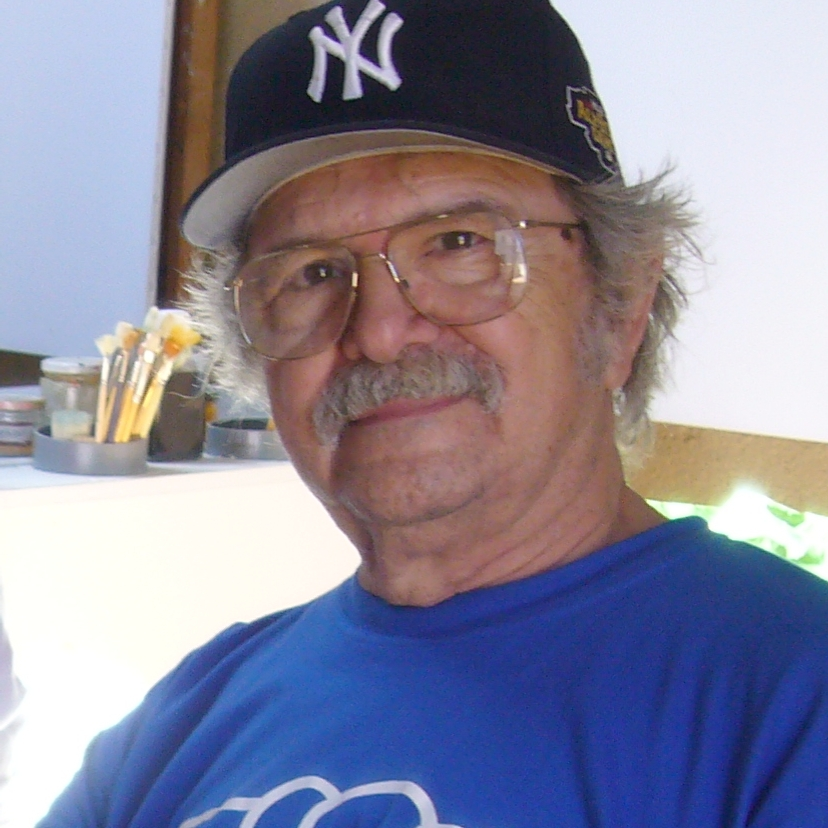
- Ramos in 2007
- Born: Melvin John Ramos; July 24, 1935; Sacramento, California, US
- Died: October 14, 2018 (aged 83); Oakland, California, US
- Education: Sacramento State College (MA)
- Known for: Painting, drawing
- Movement: Pop art
- Awards: National Endowment for the Arts – Visual Artist's Fellowship Grant, 1986

Melvin John Ramos (July 24, 1935 – October 14, 2018) was an American figurative painter, specializing most often in paintings of female nudes, whose work incorporates elements of realist and abstract art.

Born in Sacramento, California, to a first generation Portuguese-Azorean immigrant family, he gained his popularity as part of the pop art movement of the 1960s. Ramos is "best known for his paintings of superheroes and voluptuous female nudes emerging from cornstalks or Chiquita bananas, popping up from candy wrappers or lounging in martini glasses". He was also a university art professor.

== Biography ==
Ramos attended Sacramento Junior College and San Jose State College. One of his earliest art teachers was Wayne Thiebaud, who is considered his mentor, and who remained his friend. Ramos received his B.A. and his M.A. from Sacramento State College, finishing his education in 1958. From 1958 to 1966, Ramos taught art at Elk Grove High School and Mira Loma High School in Sacramento. After two brief college teaching assignments, he began a long career (1966–1997) at California State University, East Bay, in Hayward, California, and then served as professor emeritus. He was Artist in Residence at Syracuse University and the University of Wisconsin.

== Marriage ==
In 1955, Ramos married Leta (Helmers) Ramos, who was the model for many of his early nude paintings.

== Art career ==
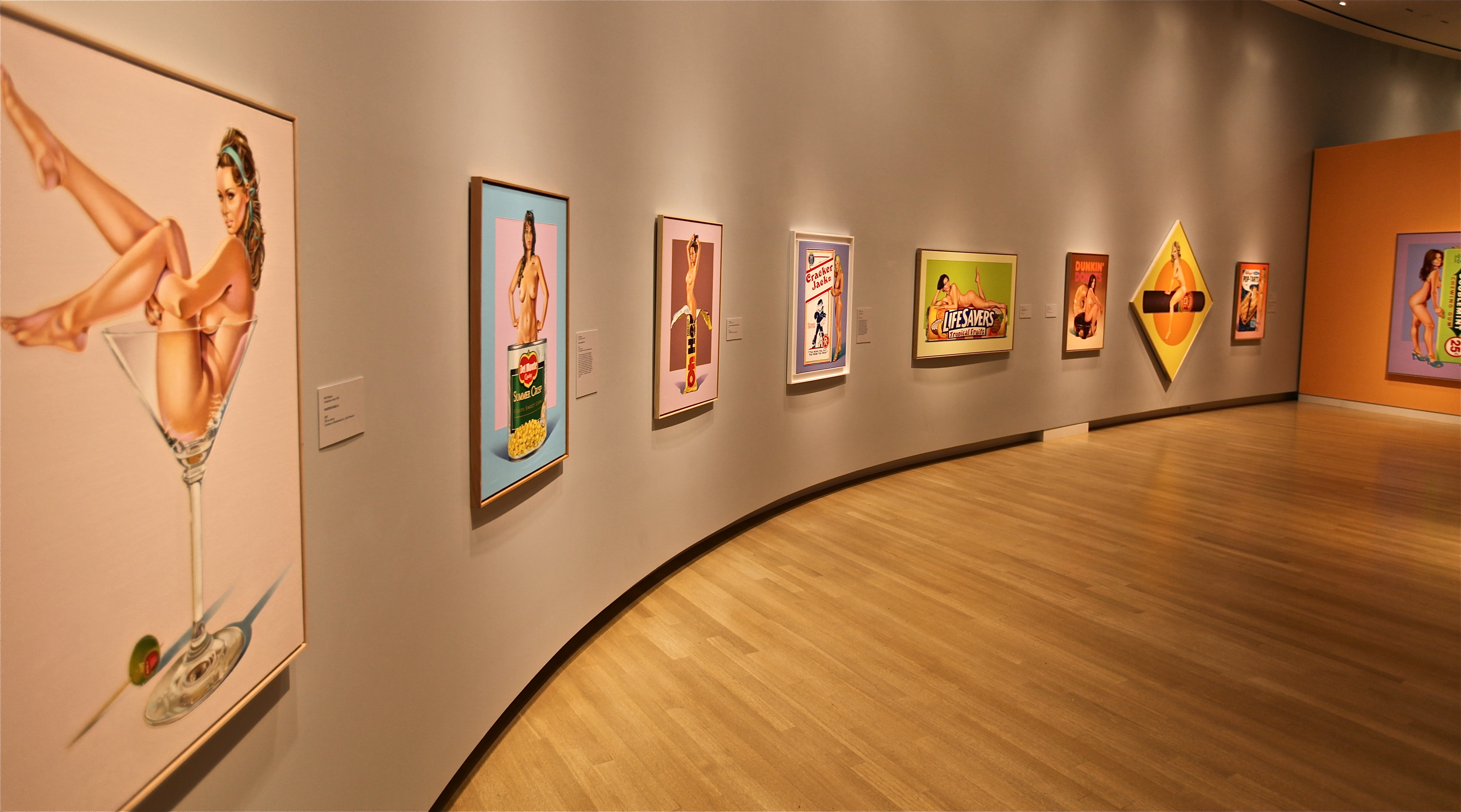
Mel Ramos – Exhibition in Crocker Art Museum, Sacramento, 2012

Ramos received his first important recognition in the early 1960s; since 1959 he has participated in more than 150 solo and 120 group shows.

Along with Roy Lichtenstein and Andy Warhol, he was one of the first artists to do paintings of images from comic books, and works of the three were exhibited together at the Los Angeles County Museum of Art in 1963. Along with Claes Oldenburg, James Rosenquist, Tom Wesselmann and Wayne Thiebaud, Ramos produced art works that celebrated aspects of popular culture as represented in mass media. His paintings have been shown in major exhibitions of pop art in the U.S. and in Europe and reproduced in books, catalogs, and periodicals throughout the world.

In 1986 he received a National Endowment for the Arts Visual Artists Fellowship Grant.

In 2009, Ramos was part of the first Portuguese American bilingual art book and exhibit in California "Ashes to Life a Portuguese American Story in Art" with fellow artists Nathan Oliveira, John Mattos and João de Brito.

Ramos originally showed with Leo Castelli. Then Ivan Karp introduced Ramos' work to the art dealer Louis Meisel. He was represented by the Louis K. Meisel Gallery since 1971. He has also been represented for many years by San Francisco's Modernism gallery, Galerie Ernst Hilger, Austria and Burkhard Eikelmann Gallery (Düsseldorf).

A major exhibition of his work was held at the Albertina in Vienna in 2011.

A retrospective of over 50 years of his work opened at the Crocker Art Museum in his hometown of Sacramento on June 2, 2012. This show is "the first major exhibition of his work in his hometown", and his first American retrospective in 35 years.

His work can be found in the permanent collections of the New York Museum of Modern Art, the Solomon R. Guggenheim Museum, the Whitney Museum of American Art, the San Francisco Museum of Modern Art, the Norton Simon Museum, and the Hirshhorn Museum in Washington, D.C.

According to the Artnet Price Database, Ramos's £1.07 million [$1.69 million] auction record was set at Sotheby's London in 2012.

Ramos's work has maintained a sustained presence in the secondary market, with paintings and prints regularly appearing in major international auctions, reflecting continued collector and institutional interest in his Pop Art production. In 2015, his painting Miss Corn-Flakes (1964) achieved a result exceeding $2 million at auction, marking one of the highest publicly recorded prices for his work.

== Death ==
Ramos died of heart failure on October 14, 2018, at Kaiser Hospital in Oakland, California.
