= Binh Danh =

American photographer (born 1977)

- Born: Binh Danh; October 9, 1977 (age 48); Vietnam
- Education: San Jose State University; Stanford University
- Known for: Photography, chlorophyll prints
- Notable work: Life:Dead
- Website: binhdanh.com

Binh Danh is an American artist known for chlorophyll prints and daguerreotypes on the subjects of war, immigration, and National Parks.

== Early life and education ==
Danh was born in Vietnam in 1977. He immigrated with his parents to the United States in 1979. He graduated with a BFA in Photography from San Jose State University in 2002, and MFA from Stanford University. At the age of 25, Danh was one of the youngest artists to be invited into Stanford University's Master of Fine Arts program.

== Work ==
Danh's early work focuses predominately on the Vietnam War era and he has been quoted as saying that a lot of his work is involved with the theme of death. Danh has also said that the photographs he uses "bring up and start to fabricate memories" of his life in Vietnam. His images were described as being able to "summon up revulsion over present violent conflicts in the world without direct topical reference" and a critic said that his images of war scenes "evoked wars past and present with an unforced economy almost unparalleled in political art."

He began a series of daguerreotypes of American National Parks in 2012. Cheryl Haines Gallery states that these images are "an attempt to negotiate his connection as a Vietnamese American with the landscape and history of the United States." and "He explains, "I am interested in how we as a nation of immigrants could 'reflect' on these daguerreotypes and see our faces in this landscape." The highly reflective surfaces of Danh's daguerreotypes literally mirror their surroundings, embracing viewers within the idyllic environs of this national landmark."

=== Chlorophyll prints ===
Danh uses a specific organic technique of his own invention to create his art, the style of which is referred as chlorophyll print. This process begins with choosing a suitable leaf; Danh prefers to use leaves from his mother's garden. Positives of photographs are placed onto leaves, and then covered with glass to be exposed to sunlight for a period of days. If Danh is satisfied with the finished piece, it will be encapsulated permanently by being cast in a solid block of resin. Danh has articulated that throughout his education he has been "very attracted to art, history, and science" and that the processes used in his work represent his "interest in the sciences and photographic techniques." Danh has also stated that the history he searches for "are the hidden stories embedded in the landscape around" him that chlorophyll prints "capture his belief in the interconnectedness of the natural world."

=== Notable works ===
"Life: Dead", a series of framed, withered leaves imprinted with images of dead soldiers, was created using photographs of American soldiers who died between May 28 and June 3, 1969, the images of which were taken from an issue of Life magazine titled "One Week's Dead", and then were digitally rendered into a negative print.

To create "Searching for the Cosmos", Danh used images downloaded from the Internet of the night sky, the negative of which were overlaid on individual leaves. The shadows of the negatives meant that the leaves were deprived of light. On one particular veined, almond-shaped leaf, named "Night Sky", this interruption in photosynthesis resulted in an image that was described as being "like the starry heavens."

To accompany an ofrenda, or offering, he produced for the Oakland Museum show in 2003, which combined photographs of the dead, candles, incense and a statue of the Buddha. Danh commented on his own culture's observance of death, "I come from a Vietnamese Buddhist background, so in my house there are many altars dedicated to many deceased relatives."

In a review of San Francisco's de Young Museum 2023 exhibition Ansel Adams in Our Time, Jessica Zack writes about Danh's National Park series,

"McCaw and Danh are both nationally recognized for their unique approaches to contemporary landscape photography, work that can be seen, in relation to Adams, as both an homage and an invigorating departure from the famed San Francisco photographer who died in 1984 at 82 and whose ashes were scattered on Half Dome. They create one-of-a-kind images using old technologies in fresh ways that allows them to investigate their own relationship to nature's physical and temporal realities. Having overcome their initial jitters, the two photographers have created work in some of the same locations Adams captured beginning nearly a century ago, drawn, as Adams was, to views of the natural world that can cause us to question or recalibrate our human-scale concerns."

== Solo exhibitions ==
- 2002 Binh Danh Immortality: Remnants of the Vietnam and American War, Sesnon Gallery, UC Santa Cruz, CA
- 2005 Binh Danh's Photographic Works, Mohr Gallery, Finn Center, Community School of Arts & Music, Mountain View, CA
- 2007 Botanical Stories Sanchez Art Center, Pacifica, CA
- 2007 One Week's Dead, Light Work, Syracuse, New York
- 2007 Jungle of Memories, California State University Chico, Chico, CA
- 2008 Life, Times, and Matter of the Swamp at the Mary Elizabeth Dee Shaw Gallery, Weber State University, Ogden, UT
- 2008 Life: Dead at the Clara Hatton Gallery, Colorado State University, Fort Collins, CO
- 2009 In the Eclipse of Angkor at the Eleanor D. Wilson Museum, Hollins University, Roanoke, VA
- 2010 Binh Danh: Collecting Memories, Mills College Art Museum, Oakland, CA
- 2010 Binh Danh: In the Eclipse of Angkor North Carolina Museum of Art
- 2010 Binh Danh: Life, Times, and Matters of the Swamp, Art Museum, University of Wyoming Laramie, Wyoming
- 2016 Memorial Art Gallery, Rochester, NY
- 2018 Louisiana State Museum, New Orleans, LA
- 2018 Phillips Museum of Art, Lancaster, PA

== Publications ==
- Binh Danh: The Enigma of Belonging. Photography by Danh, Texts by Binh Boreth Ly, Joshua Chuang, Isabelle Thuy Pelaud, Andrew Lam. Santa Fe, New Mexico: Radius, 2023. ISBN 9781955161039

== Collections ==
- Cantor Arts Center, Stanford University, CA
- Corcoran Gallery of Art, Washington, D.C.
- George Eastman Museum, Rochester, NY
- M.H. de Young Museum, San Francisco, CA
- Museum of Contemporary Photography, Columbia College, Chicago, IL
- Museum of Fine Arts, Boston, MA
- National Gallery of Art, Washington, D.C.
- North Carolina Museum of Art, Raleigh, NC
- Oakland Museum of California, Oakland, CA
- Philadelphia Museum of Art, Philadelphia, PA
- Rochester Memorial Art Gallery, Rochester, NY
- San Francisco Museum of Modern Art, CA
- San Jose Museum of Art, San Jose, CA
- University of California, Santa Cruz, Library Special Collection, Santa Cruz, CA
- Eleanor D. Wilson Museum, Hollins University, Roanoke, VA
- Taubman Museum of Art, Roanoke, Virginia

== Awards ==
- 1996 Bank of America Achievement Award in the Field of Fine Arts, Plaque Winner, San Jose, CA
- 2007 Visions from the New California Award, Alliance of Artists Communities, Providence, RI
- 2010 Eureka Fellowship
- 2012 8th Biennale of Sydney, Australia
- 2019 Creative Work Fund
