= Arts Council Silicon Valley =

Coordinates: 37.33761°N 121.88975°W

Arts Council Silicon Valley logo

The Arts Council Silicon Valley (1982–2013) was the official Santa Clara County, United States arts council.

Established in 1982 originally as the Cultural Council and later as Arts Council of Santa Clara County, Arts Council Silicon Valley (ACSV) was a private, nonprofit arts organization dedicated to improving the quality of life for Santa Clara County residents by creating and fostering arts and culture throughout the region.

As a grant agency, the ACSV provided funding and fundraising support services to more than 140 local arts organizations and individual artists. It also provided advocacy, marketing, and support services to more than 600 local arts organizations and strove to help make the arts accessible to local youth. As the official state and local partner with the California Arts Council and the County of Santa Clara, the ACSV was in 2010 the largest private nonprofit arts council in the state. During its 31 year history, the ACSV had distributed nearly $24 million in grants and services to the arts in Santa Clara County. Arts Council Silicon Valley and 1st ACT Silicon Valley merged in 2013 to create the regional nonprofit SVCREATES. SVCREATES builds on the Arts Council’s 30-year history of support to the arts community.

== Early history ==
Artist/advocate Ruth Tunstall Grant served on the first ACSV board of directors with broad involvement and impact in community service. She saw San José’s stagnant urban core and advocated for a greater role for the arts and creative problem solving. While on the board, she started Hands on the Arts, now Sunnyvale’s annual family festival. She worked with inveterate arts advocate Consuelo Santos Killins, a member and former chair of the California Arts Council, who understood power dynamics locally and at the state level.

In 1987, a panel for the Times, “Gambol or Gamble: Going for Broke in Silicon Valley,” was held at Santa Clara University (SCU). The event was put on by Cultural Advisory Alliance (CAA)—Arts Council/Music and Arts Foundation of Santa Clara County (the two groups had combined) and sponsored by the SCU music and art departments. Supervisor Rod Diridon and Santos Killins were part of this CAA annual meeting. Arts Council member J. Michael Bewley was “The Umpire” that refereed the sometimes tumultuous discussions around funding, growth, and downtown investment. Tunstall Grant participated in the panel. Afterwards, Tunstall Grant stated with some resignation: “We decided the big organizations need to go first,” referring to acquiring major funding for the museum, opera, and all. That was hard for small and mid-sized arts organizations … how they were going to survive a few more years …" In the late 1980s almost all local arts grant allocations went to six large-budget institutions such as the San Jose Symphony, San Jose Cleveland Ballet, SJMA.

A breakthrough came in 1989, when the Euphrat Museum of Art (then Euphrat Gallery) was the site for a press conference sponsored by the Community Foundation, Santa Clara County Arts Council and National Endowment for the Arts to announce the creation of a major new endowed fund for small to mid-size arts organizations in Santa Clara County. While these grants were small, they made a difference.

In 1990, Tunstall Grant served as a facilitator for a Multicultural Center panel, Santa Clara County Arts Council Symposium “Challenges, Choices & Solutions: A Vision for American Art in the 1990s.”

In the new millennium, Silicon Valley's cultural ecology changed rapidly with emigrants from India, Taiwan, Vietnam, and Mexico. New systemic disparities in formal education and income levels increasingly presented opportunities and challenges in social, economic, technological, and government realms. At a forward-looking event in 1995 at the Euphrat, the Arts Council under new director Bruce Davis applauded the "arts as an intervention for social ills," connecting arts with government, schools, youth, veterans, social services, and prisons. Presenters included a county supervisor, a judge, and arts/community leaders from Menlo Park and East Palo Alto to Gilroy. "We had to run two sessions!" Davis recalled. Director Davis (1994–2011), working with Diem Jones, Lissa Jones, and Audrey Wong, expanded the Arts Council’s community importance and increased seed funding to small and mid-sized organizations.
