= Triton Museum of Art =

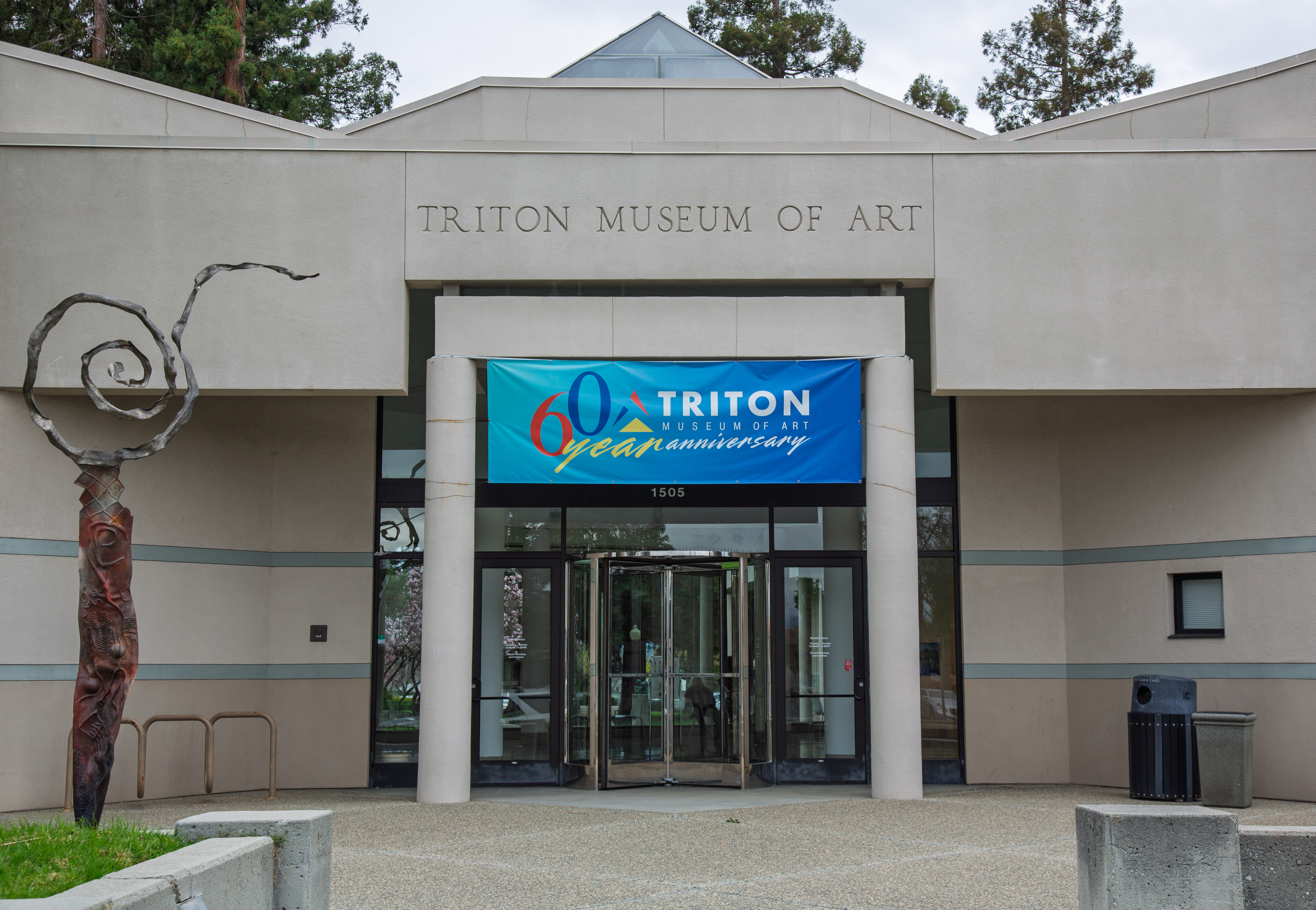
- The front of the Triton Museum of Art building
- Established: 1965
- Location: Santa Clara, California
- Coordinates: 37.3561082°N 121.9552176°W
- Type: Art museum
- Director: Preston Metcalf
- Website: www.tritonmuseum.org

The Triton Museum of Art is a contemporary art museum located at 1505 Warburton Avenue in Santa Clara, California.

== History ==
The museum was founded in 1965 in San Jose, California, by rancher, lawyer and art patron W. Robert Morgan and his wife June. It is the oldest non-university museum in Santa Clara County. Less than two years after its opening, the Triton Museum moved to its current location in Santa Clara, California.

Exhibitions and programs were held in four pavilions surrounded by a seven-acre park. Due to the tremendous economic and population growth of the Santa Clara Valley during the 1970s, a new facility was built to serve the changing needs of the community. Construction for the current facility was completed in October, 1987. The 22,000 square-foot space features high ceilings, pyramidal skylights and dramatic lighting. The spacious design of the building was created for versatile art presentation, as well as an aesthetically pleasing experience for the museum visitors.

== About ==
Located across the street from the Santa Clara Civic Center, the Triton Museum of Art collects and exhibits contemporary and historical works with an emphasis on artists of the Greater Bay Area. Over 50,000 people attend the museum on-site annually, through its exhibitions, education and community programs, and over 90,000 people view the museum's satellite gallery and exhibitions annually.

The Triton Museum is home to acclaimed permanent collections including the Austen D. Warburton collection of Indigenous American art and artifacts and the largest public holdings of paintings by Theodore Wores.

The museum is a nonprofit organization that is supported by contributions from its members and the wider community at large.

== See also ==
- Morgan Horse (sculpture)
- De Saisset Museum
