= Plastic in art =

Use of synthetic materials to create art

Within the 20th century, there came the use of plastics in art. In the latter half of the century, plastic technology advanced so that it was feasible for artists to start using plastic and acrylics as an artwork medium.

Artist Roxy Paine created a sculpture-making machine "Scumak No. 2": a large metal contraption that oozed acrylic on to a conveyor belt that jiggled slowly back and forth. The barely liquid plastic would pile up and solidify. After a few hours, the conveyor belt would move the pile forward and begin a new sculpture.

== Using found plastic ==
Art made of commodity materials sometimes uses found objects made of plastic. Plastic containers are useful in papier-mâché for building frames.

Environmental artists are using salvaged beach plastic to create art as a means of bringing awareness of plastic pollution in Earth's oceans. Examples include: Tess Felix, Judith Selby Lang and Richard Lang, members of Women Eco Artists Dialog, and the photography of Chris Jordan.

Czech artist Veronika Richterová uses PET plastic to create plant and animal sculptures.

== Use of liquid acrylics ==
Liquid acrylics can be used to create two- and three-dimensional plastic images and objects. Artist, Tyler Turkle, pours multiple thin layers of pigmented liquid acrylic to form sheets of plastic that result in paintings and sculptures. After adequate drying time between applications, these solid plastic sheets can be readily peeled off most surfaces and re-adhered to others.

== Gallery ==
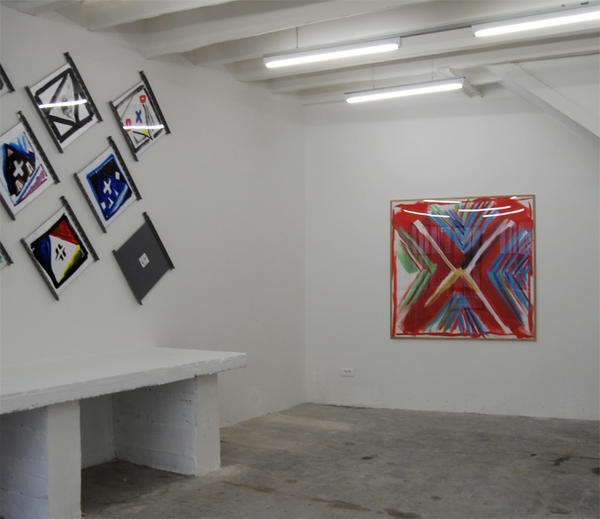
Saytour Torchons Nîmes

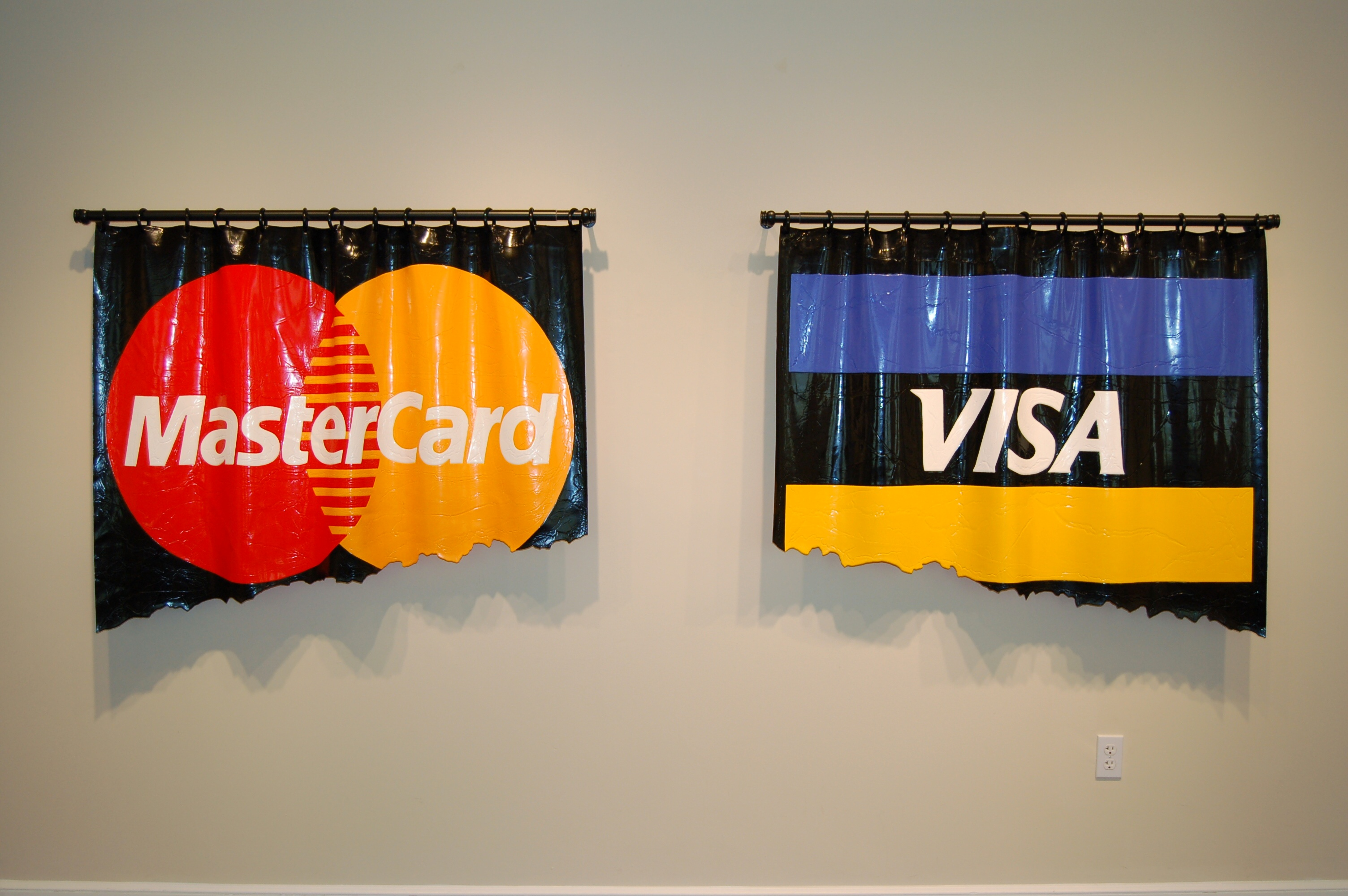
"MasterCard/Visa (If it wasn’t for plastic money I wouldn’t have any money at all)", poured acrylic, Tyler Turkle, 2006

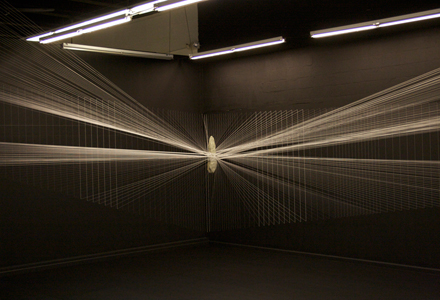
Milton Becerra Ale'ya Durban Segnini Gallery Miami 2009.

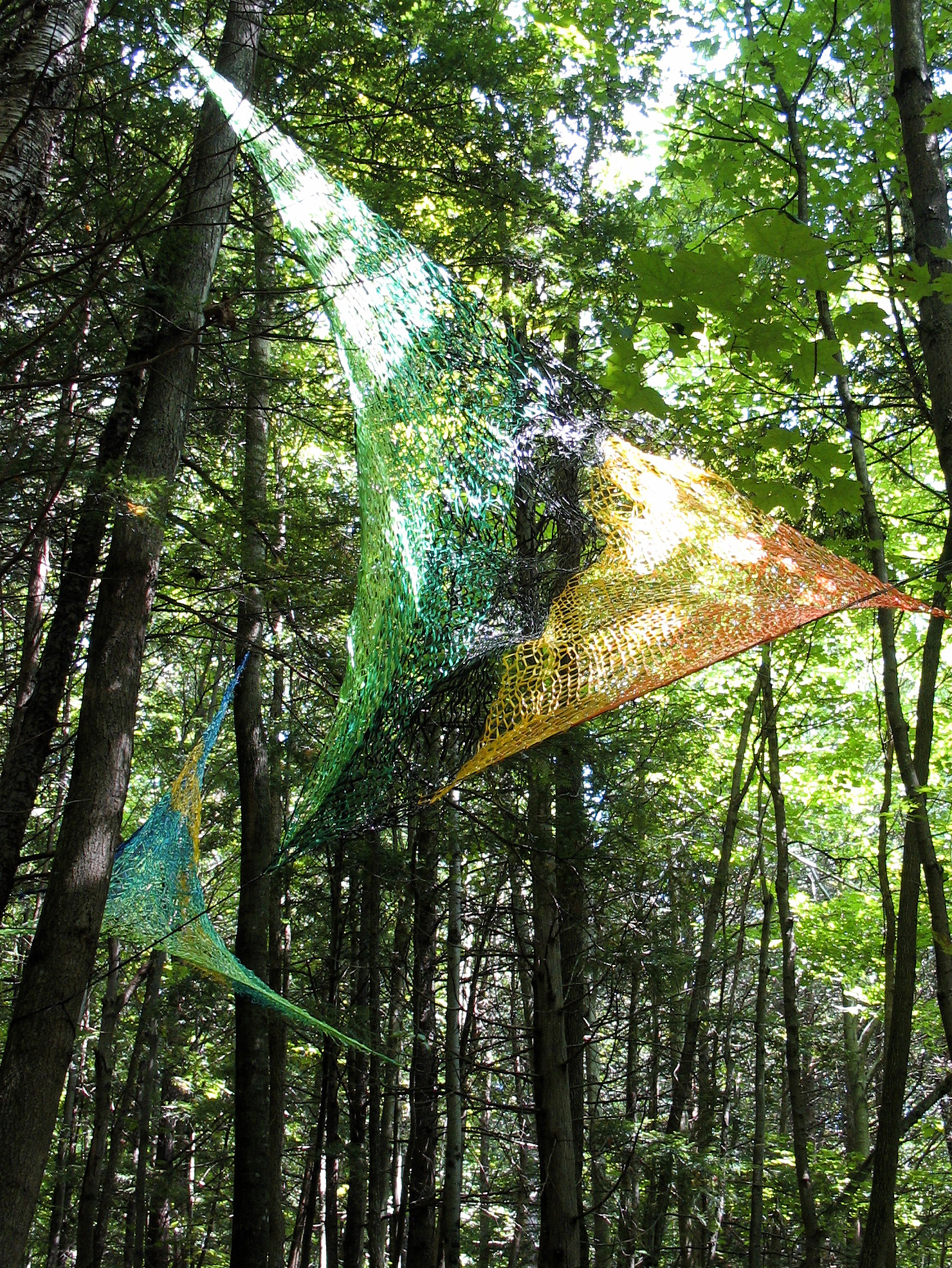
Bois de Belle Rivière Québec 2010

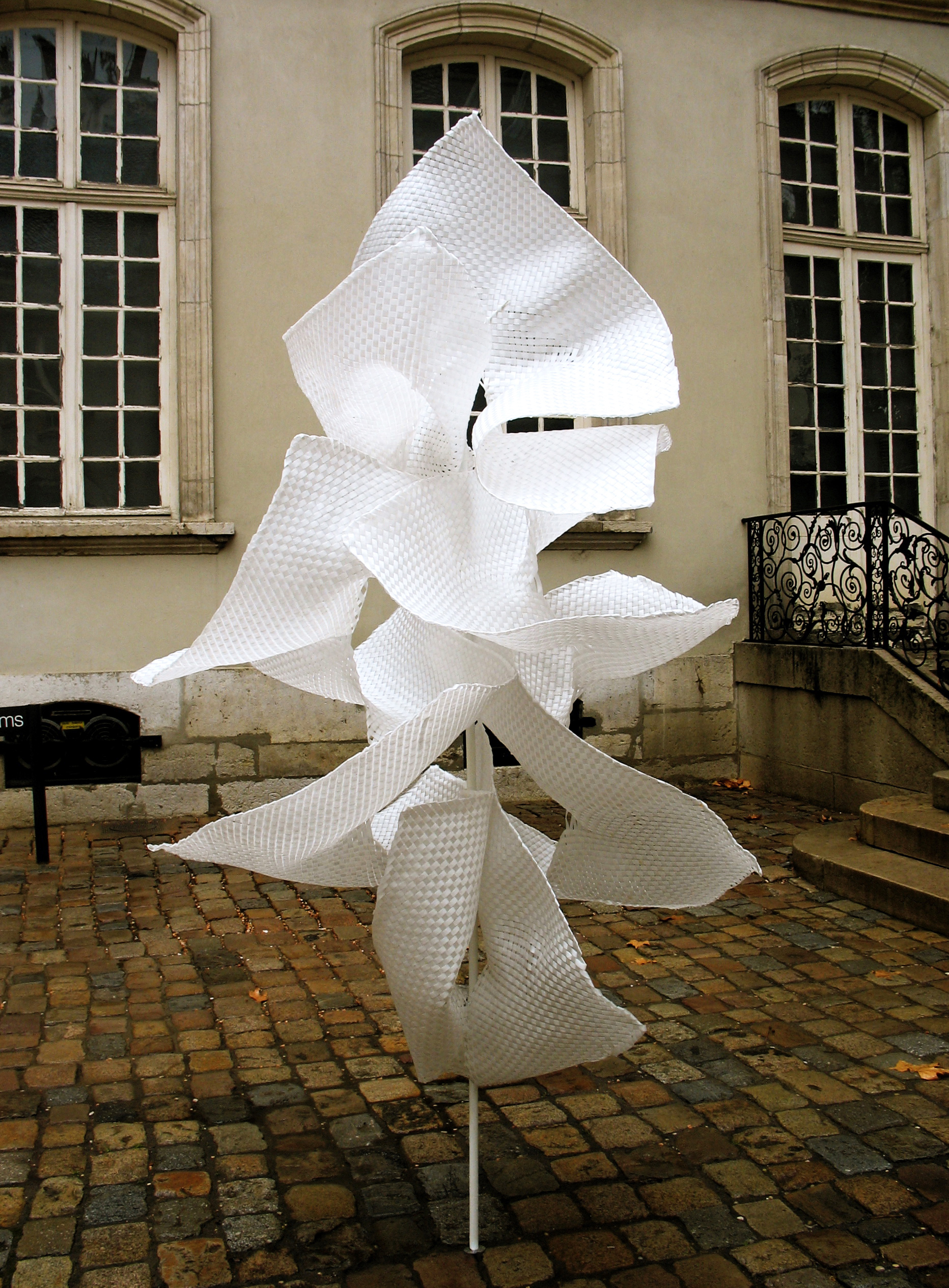
Sarabande Musée des Tissus Lyon 2007-2008

== See also ==
- Acrylic paint
- New materials in 20th-century art
- Plastic arts
