= Richard Lang =

Richard Lang may refer to:

- Richard Lang (artist), American artist and writer known for working with beach plastic
- Richard Lang (CEO), co-founder and CEO of Democrasoft
- Richard Lang (cyclist) (born 1989), Australian racing cyclist
- Rick Lang (born 1953), Canadian curler
- Richard Lang (director), American television and film director (A Change of Seasons etc.)
- Richard Lang (programmer), British computer programmer, co-author of ChessGenius

== See also ==
- Richard Langly
