= Al Brooks =

Al Brooks may refer to:

- Albert Brooks (born 1947), American actor
- Alfred Brooks (dancer) (1916–2005), American modern dancer and dance company founder
