= Judith Selby Lang =

American artist and environmental activist

Judith Selby Lang is an American artist and environmental activist working with found beach plastic. Selby Lang is known for sourcing beach plastic from a single site: 1000 yards of Kehoe Beach along the Point Reyes National Seashore in Northern California, and then turning that plastic into artworks. Selby Lang works both independently and with her partner Richard Lang.

== Education ==
Judith Selby Lang has a BA in art from Pitzer College. She also has an MA in Interdisciplinary Studies in Creative Arts from San Francisco State University, where she was a student of Christine Tamblyn.

== Career ==
=== Early work ===
Selby Lang's early work, which was sculptural in nature, was included in a 1988 New York City exhibition at Archetype Gallery and in 1989 at Nexus Contemporary Art in Atlanta, Georgia

=== Solo work ===
In a 2009 review of the San Francisco and New York City exhibition Ineffable/Woman, Debra Koppman describes Selby Lang's artwork as ". . . an homage to aging a marker of accomplishment. Bringing the evidence of time and gravity into sharp focus, the artist made carefully rendered pencil portraits of older women on silk. The detailed faces are framed and floating in headdresses of white silk, lending them the quality of holy people, nuns or perhaps angels."

About Selby Lang's The Last Dance, Art Works for Change states, "In her installation entitled, “The Last Dance,” Judith Selby Lang helps us visualize the ecological footprints of 48 nations. With a playful reference to dance instruction diagrams, she created larger-than-life footprints from recycled carpet padding, and invited visitors to explore the relative contributions of 48 nations to the global ecological footprint. She asks us to consider the steps we must take to reduce our use of the planet's finite resources, and to do so before the music stops."

=== One Beach Plastic ===
Selby Lang has a long standing collaboration as One Beach Plastic with partner Richard Lang. Enviro-Art Gallery writes:

"Since 1999 Richard Lang and Judith Selby Lang as a collaborative team have been visiting Kehoe Beach, Point Reyes National Seashore in Northern California. They have rambled 1000 meters of tideline of this one beach hundreds of times to gather plastic debris washing out of the Pacific Ocean and from this one beach have collected over two tons of material. By carefully collecting and "curating" the bits of plastic, they fashion it into works of art that matter-of-factly show, with minimal artifice, the material as it is. The viewer is often surprised that this colorful stuff is the thermoplastic junk of our throwaway culture."

Their practice is further described in an article by Pucci Foods:

"They collect plastic debris from a set stretch of beach 1000 yards long. Instead of sending this debris to the magical “away” land of garbage landfills, they craft the colorful pieces into stunning works of plastic art. By converting this beach waste into beauty, they expose viewers to a new perspective of human culture. Garbage becomes art and indifference becomes realization, encouraging us to re-examine the way we look at our consumption of plastic. Each piece of plastic has a story to tell, and Judith and Richard are excellent storytellers. Their plastic art has raised tremendous awareness of plastic pollution by enticing people to experience the aesthetic pleasure of their beach plastic artwork."

In a 2001 review of their solo exhibition at Gallery Route One in Northern California, Barbara Morris writes, "With wry humor and a sophisticated aesthetic sense,, they have arranged hundreds of pounds of beach trash into an assortment of assemblage and installation." Morris continued:

"Disposable Truths serves the purpose of making a statement about the way we interact with our environment while taking small steps in a positive direction. . . Selby and Lang have produced an unassuming and thoughtful show which quietly reflects on the current state of our species."

The Arts and Healing Networks writes, "The plastic they collect has become everything from sculptural wall art to digital prints, a wedding dress, jewelry, a mobile car sculpture, and more. Ultimately, their work combines fun and passionate obsession with a thoughtful message about ocean pollution, recycling and creative re-use." An introduction to their exhibition at the Bade Museum in California states:

"Guided by the motto, 'beauty first,' the Langs bring attention to the problem of plastic pollution by creating colorful and sensitive artwork out of these plastic remnants. The Langs’ work ranges from large collages to jewelry pieces, they often compose arrangements of plastic fragments—based on color, shape, or both—to create large-scale prints. The plastic pieces can then be re-sorted for re-use in future works."

NPR writer Coburn Dukehart comments, "With a background in the Bauhaus style of art, the Langs pay special attention to the interplay of color and light in their work. . . "

And in an article by Anne Veh and Richard Whittaker, "What I've come to appreciate and love about the Langs' approach to their artwork is its humor and playfulness and how it invites a curiosity to learn more. Most importantly, it inspires the question, What can we do?"

A Smithsonian Magazine article states:

"It’s not just about picking up the plastic, but what he [Richard] and Judith do with it. Since 1999, they’ve found countless ways to turn their huge collection of beach debris into extraordinary art. Partners and collaborators, they have created found-object works ranging from exquisite jewelry to mural-size photographs; from wall-mounted sculptures to, most recently, the coveted trophies awarded at the 2011 Telluride Mountainfilm Festival. Their work has appeared in exhibitions worldwide, from Singapore to San Francisco’s Museum of Modern Art."

According to the Fisher Museum of Art, "Judith Selby Lang and Richard Lang, take an almost archaeological approach to collecting and curating bits of plastic trash while fashioning it into works of art." And from the Halsey Institute of Contemporary Art, "Their works have been featured in over 70 exhibitions in galleries, museums, universities and science centers. The couple has observed viewers repeatedly shocked that the art is handcrafted with trashed materials that have ended up in the ocean."

About the 2021 exhibition at San Francisco's Cliff House: "We encourage the visitor to not miss the former Cliff House kitchen where the artists Richard Lang and Judith Selby Lang replaced the food with plastic wastes collected on California beaches (2 tons of plastic!!). The installation is self-explanatory and visually impacting."

Tony Bravo states, in reviewing Just One Word—Plastics at Rena Bransten Gallery in 2021, "Richard Lang and Judith Selby Lang's "Shovel Bands" perhaps best exemplifies how several works in the show at first seem whimsical or beautiful in their artificiality. But as you get closer, you realize the pops of color are not flowers or some sculptural element. They are the type of plastic bands that litter many beaches today, waiting to pierce your feet and choke wildlife."

In 2022 the Langs were invited to build a Trash Castle at Huntington Beach for Coastal Cleanup Day and California Department of Transportation’s Stormwater education campaign. Caltrans Director Tony Tavares states, "Trash Castle is a striking visualization of the common pollutants blighting community recreation spots and degrading California’s water. Our hope is that when people see the Trash Castle, they will start to understand the scope of the problem and be moved to make a difference.”

== Exhibitions ==
Home Again, Home Again, Sonoma Community Center, Sonoma, California, 2026

The Guardhouse, For-SITE Foundation, Fort Mason, San Francisco, 2023

Under Water, Palo Alto Art Center, Palo Alto, California, 2023

Great Wave, Santa Clara University Art Gallery, Santa Clara, California, 2022

Lands End: a Climate Crisis Exhibition at Cliff House, San Francisco, California, 2021

Just One Word: Plastic, Rena Bransten Gallery, San Francisco, California, 2021

Here Is The Sea, Richmond Art Center, Richmond, California, 2019

Eco Echo: Unnatural Selection, WORKS/San Jose, San Jose, California, 2018

Gyre: The Plastic Ocean, Fisher Museum of Art, University of Southern California, Los Angeles, California, 2015

Like Diamonds, Plastic is Forever: Wearable Art by Judith Selby Lang, Bolinas Museum, Bolinas, California, 2015

From Kehoe to Cavallo, the Mystery in the Mess, Cavallo Point Lodge, California, 2011

Ineffable/Woman, Minna Street Center at the California Institute of Integral Studies and Ceres gallery, New York City, 2009

The Last Dance, New Federal Building Plaza, San Francisco, California, 2008

Recycle Ryoanji, Civic Center Plaza, San Francisco, California, 2007

Ecovisions, Thoreau Center for Sustainability, San Francisco, California, 2005

ECO2: Fifteen Marin and Bay Area Artist Respond to the State of the Natural Environment, Falkirk Cultural Center, San Rafael, California, 2003

Turning the Tables, Gallery Route One, Point Reyes Station, California, 2002

Disposal Truths, Gallery Route One, Point Reyes Station, California, 2001

== Awards ==
- Arts and Healing Network Award, 2009
- Marin Arts Council New Work Fellowship, 2007
- Marin Arts Council Individual Artist Grant, 2002

== Collections ==
- Library of Congress Prints and Photographs Division Washington, D.C.
- Yale University Art Museum
- Bolinas Museum

== Bibliography ==
- Wicked Monstrous, Eco Art Space, Santa Fe, New Mexico, 2026. ISBN 979-8-988400-4-8
- Trashures: the beauty of useless stuff, Anja Brunt and Meirink Tineke, Amsterdam: BIS Publishers, 2016. ISBN 978-90-6369-425-8
- Gyre—the Plastic Ocean, Julie Decker, Anchorage Museum London: Booth-Clibborn editions, 2014. ISBN 978-1-86154-355-4
- Flotsametrics and the Floating World, Curtis Ebbesmeyer and Eric Scigliano, New York: HarperCollins, 2009. ISBN 978-0-06-155841-2
- The Universal Sea Pure or Plastic?, Foundation for Entrepreneurship, Berlin: The Institute for Art and Innovation, 2019 ISBN 978-3-9819114-1-1
- Plastic: A toxic Love Story, Susan Freinkel, Boston and New York: Houghton Mifflin Harcourt, 2011. ISBN 978-0-547-15240-0
- A Possible Anthropology—Methods for Uneasy Times, Anand Pandian, Durham and London: Duke University Press, 2019. ISBN 978-1-4780-0375-5
- Plastic Free—how I kicked the plastic habit and how you can too, Beth Terry, New York: Skyhorse Press, 2012. ISBN 978-1-61608-624-4
- Plastic Ocean: how a sea captain's chance discovery launched a determined quest to save the oceans, Charles Moore, New York: Avery, 2011. ISBN 978-1-58333-424-9
