= Mimi Kagan =

American dancer and choreographer (1918–1999)

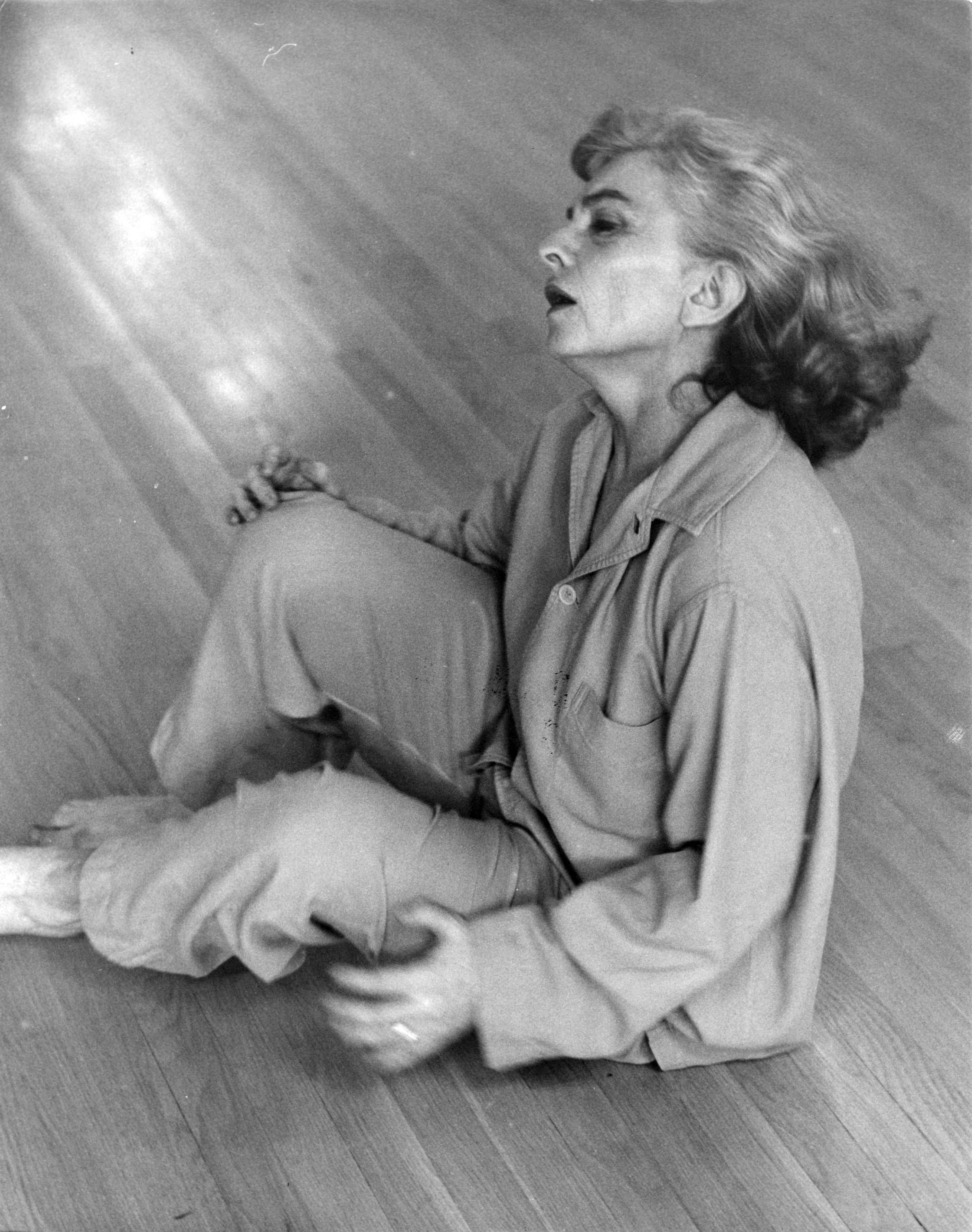
- Mimi Kagan, in Watt solo
- Born: Miriam Gabrilovna Kagan; January 17, 1918; Samara, Samara Oblast, Russian Empire
- Died: February 22, 1999 (aged 81); Oakland, California, U.S.
- Resting place: Mountain View Cemetery
- Other names: Miriam Gabrilovna Odza, Miriam Odaz, Miriam Gabrilovna Kim, Mimi Kagan Kim
- Occupations: Dancer, educator, writer, choreographer
- Known for: Modern dance
- Spouse(s): Theodore Odza (1940–1958; divorce), Earl Kim (1958–?; divorce)
- Children: 2

Mimi Kagan (1918–1999; née Miriam Gabrilovna Kagan, and also known as Miriam Odza, Mimi Kagan Kim) was a Russia-born American modern dancer, choreographer, educator and dance journalist. She was the founder of the avant-garde Mimi Kagan Dance Group and was active and influential in modern dance and choreography in New York City, the San Francisco Bay Area, Princeton, New Jersey and Cambridge, Massachusetts.

== Early life ==
Kagan was born in Samara in the Russian Empire and moved to the United States as a young child. Her family was Jewish.

== Career ==
=== New York City ===
Kagan trained for dance under Hanya Holm, one of the "Big Four" founders of American modern dance. She later became part of the Hanya Holm Dance Company. Kagan danced in Trend (1938), Holm's first United States performance. Other dancers in the Holm company included Louise Kloepper and Henrietta Greenhood (later known as Eve Gentry).

Kagan was the dance director at Henry Street Settlement Playhouse (now Abrons Arts Center) in New York City.

=== San Francisco Bay Area ===
She later moved to Berkeley, California, and worked as a co-director of Dance Associates. She founded her own company, the Mimi Kagan Dance Group, and in 1947 also worked under the name the San Francisco Dance League alongside Anna Halprin. She received an award from the San Francisco Arts Commission for dance presentation. She also taught dance at the California Labor School in San Francisco.

In 1957, the Mimi Kagan Dance Group was named as a "Communist group" by Herbert Philbrick. In 1961, the House Un-American Activities Committee targeted and blacklisted the Mimi Kagan Dance Group as a "subversive organization", which was part of a list published in national newspapers.

=== Princeton, and later Cambridge ===
In 1971 and 1972, she collaborated with her second husband, the composer Earl Kim, on the work "Exercises en Route", which toured and featured text by Samuel Beckett, and the soprano soloist Benita Valente. The show had Kagan dancing and four other dancers from Boston Ballet, including Anamarie Sarazin, Eileen O'Reilly, Robert Steele and Anthony Williams. In the 1970s, Kagan was a dance correspondent for The Boston Globe daily newspaper.

Kagan died in 1999 in Oakland, California, and is buried at the Mountain View Cemetery. Her students included Murray Louis, and she designed choreography for Adrienne Hawkins.

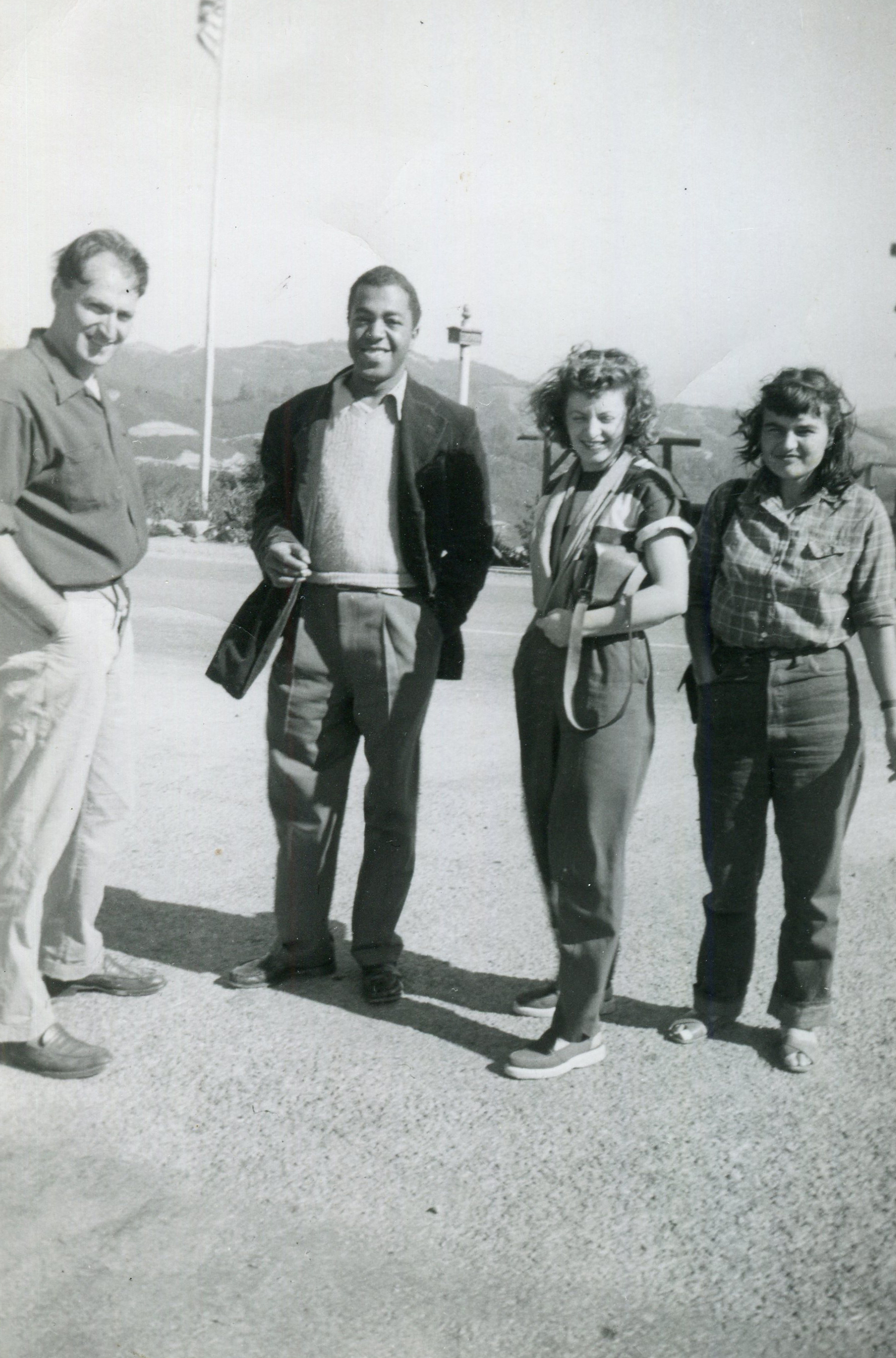
with Ted Odza (c. 1940)

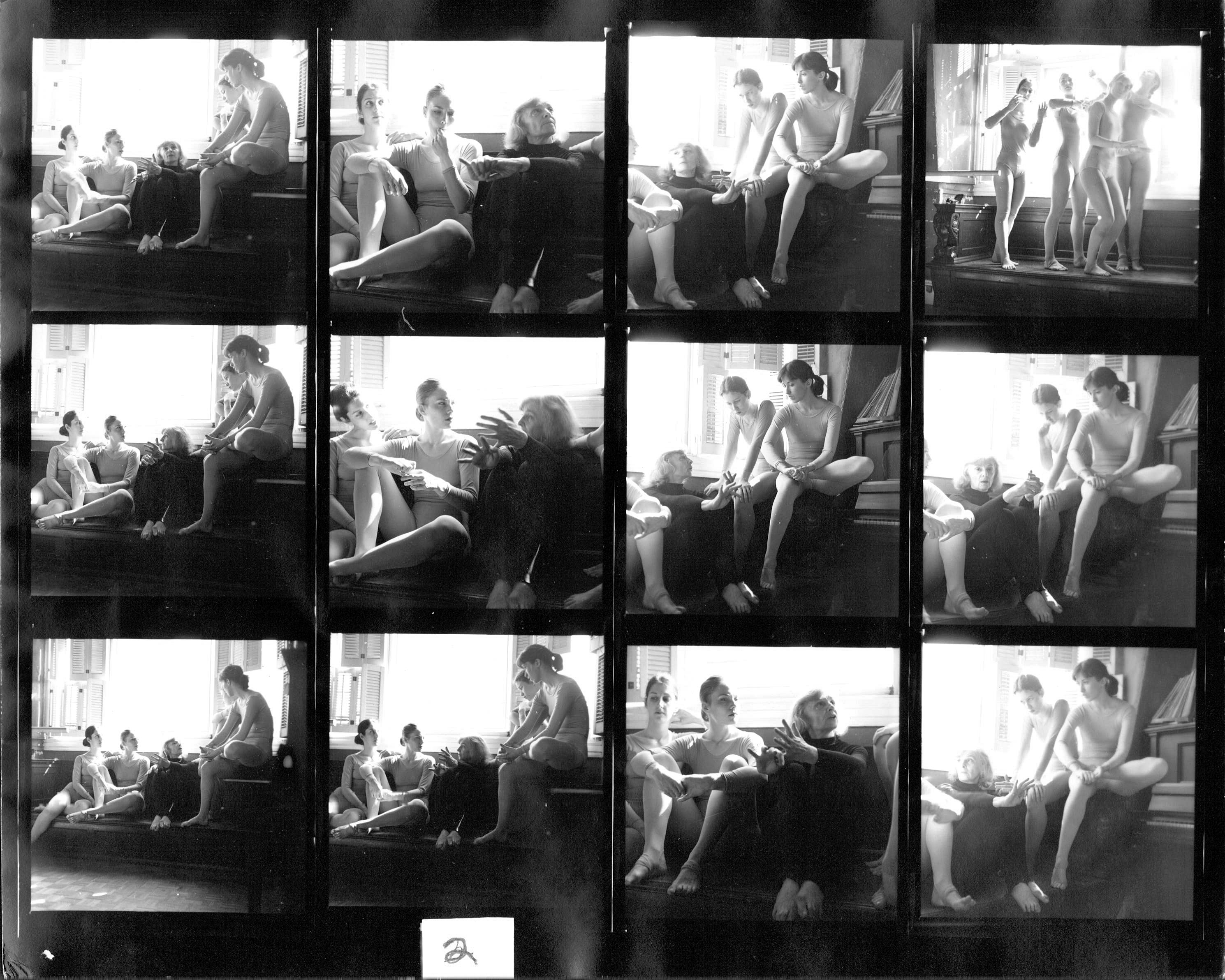
Mimi Kagan Dance Group

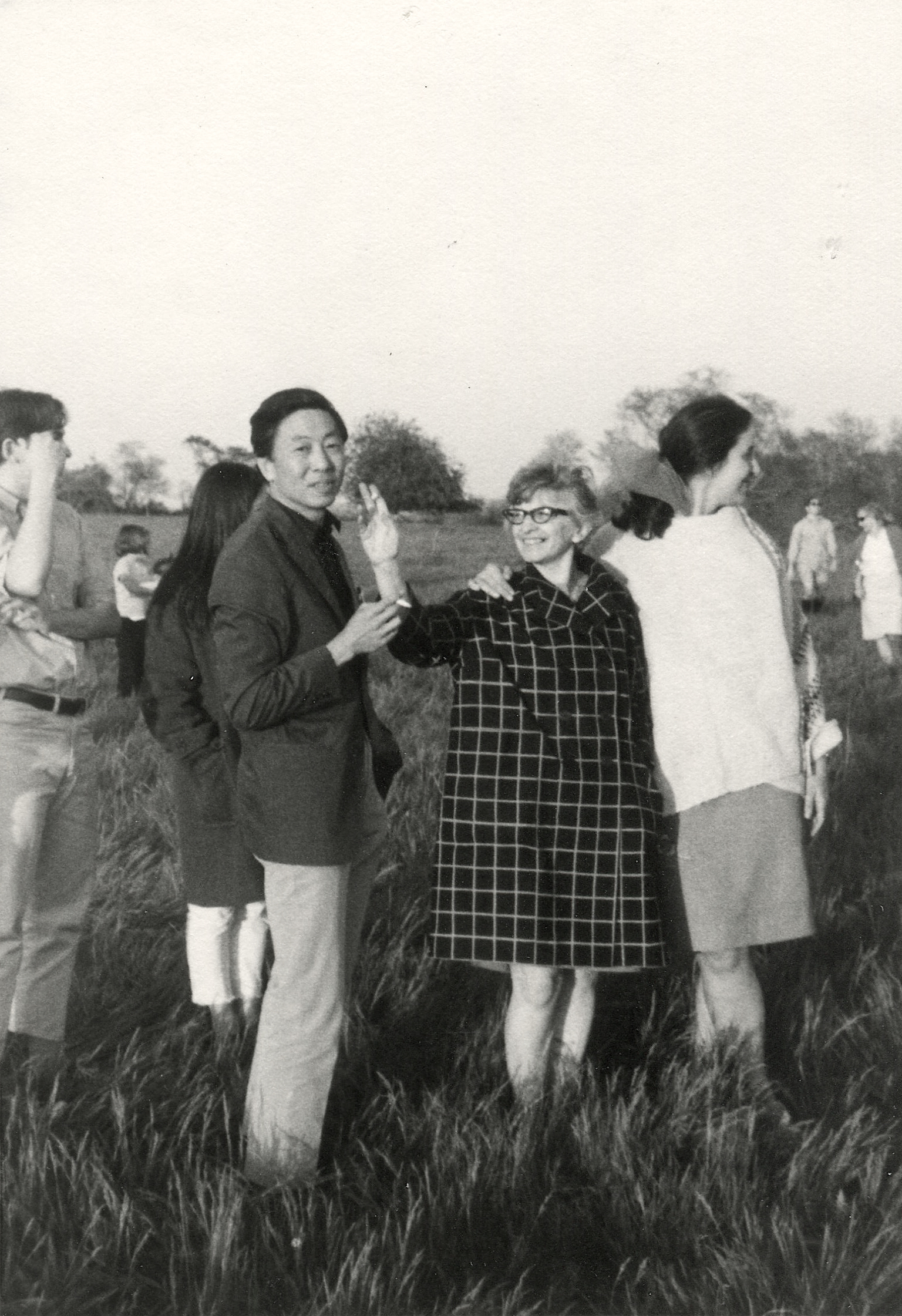
with Earl Kim (c. 1966)

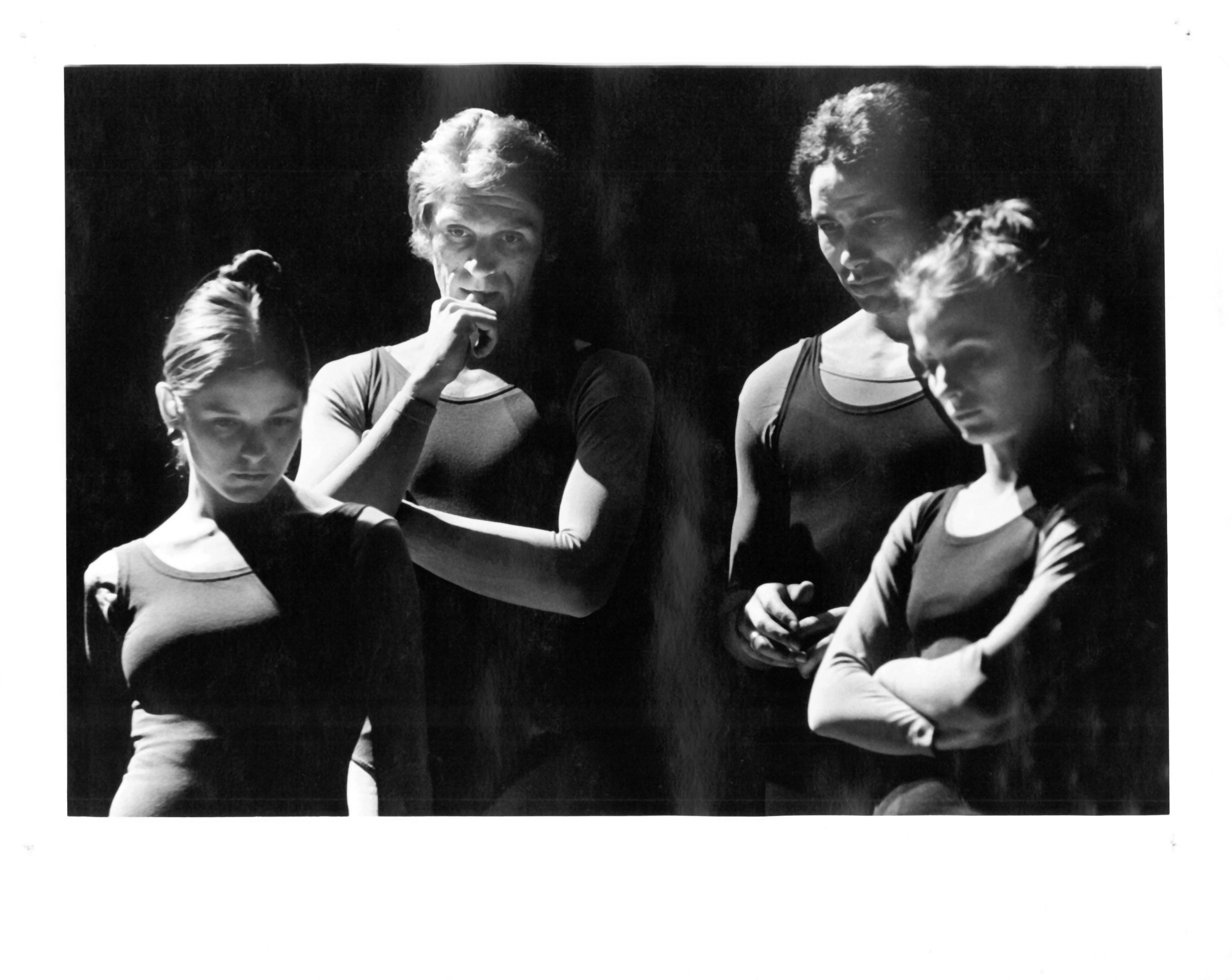
Dancers in "Exercises en Route" (c. 1970)

== Personal life ==
Kagan was married twice, in 1940 to the sculptor Theodore Odza, and in 1958 to the composer Earl Kim. Both marriages ended in divorce.
