= Hanya Holm =

German-American dancer, choreographer and dance educator (1893-1992)

- Born: Johanna Eckert; 3 March 1893; Worms, Rhineland-Palatinate, German Empire
- Died: 3 November 1992 (aged 99); New York City, New York, U.S.
- Education: Dalcroze Institute of Applied Rhythm, Wigman School
- Occupations: Dancer, choreographer, educator
- Known for: Modern dance

Hanya Holm (born Johanna Eckert; 3 March 1893 – 3 November 1992) is known as one of the "Big Four" founders of American modern dance. She was a dancer, choreographer, and above all, a dance educator.

== Early life, connection with Mary Wigman ==
Born as Johanna Eckert on 3 March 1893 in Worms, Rhineland-Palatinate, German Empire. Holm was drawn to music and drama at an early age, she attended the Dalcroze Institute of Applied Rhythm in Frankfurt, studying under Emile Jaques-Dalcroze throughout her childhood and young adult life.

At the age of 28, she saw the German expressionist Mary Wigman perform, and decided to continue her dance career at the Wigman School in Dresden where she soon became a member of the company. Mary Wigman and Hanya Holm shared a special bond through movement. Egyptian Dance was said to be the first time Wigman realized the artistic impression Holm was capable of. She had the creative will and ability to shape a choreographic vision into reality.

Wigman invited Holm to teach, co-direct the Dresden School, and in her recognition of the opportunity that opening a school in New York could offer the world of dance, eventually sent Holm to launch a Wigman branch in New York City (on September 26, 1931). The initial letters of certification and agreement from Wigman to Holm about the migration over to America to direct the school were found in her house after her death in 1992. These letters were published in Dance, Business, and Politics: Letters from Mary Wigman to Hanya Holm. In the letters the salary was laid out making sure that the transfer would continue to support her son, Klaus, who stayed in Germany, and the letter of agreement signed by both parties "promises to apply all her strength to the advancement of the New York Wigman School and to conduct the work according to Mary Wigman's ideas ... as well as to see that the M.W. philosophy of dance is implemented faithfully within and outside the New York Wigman School in every possible way".

== Hanya Holm Studio and Hanya Holm Dance Company ==
Holm was not only capable of rising to the challenge of representing the Wigman name and teaching philosophy, she also helped to shape the school and build an influence of her own. Due to the rise of Nazism and a need to distance the school from German ties, it became known as the Hanya Holm Studio (1936–1967).

Additionally she formed the Hanya Holm Dance Company in 1936, former dancers of the company included Keith Coppage, Carolyn Durand, Marva Jaffay, Mimi Kagan, Louise Kloepper, Henrietta Greenhood (later known as Eve Gentry), Ruth Ledoux, Lydia Tarnower, Bernice Van Gelder, Elizabeth Waters, Oliver Kosock, Gretchen Phillips, and Lucretia Wilson.

Holm's first United States performance was Trend (1937).

== Technique and choreography ==
Holm had a unique form of technique that shaped generations of dancers and choreographers including Alwin Nikolais, Mary Anthony, Valerie Bettis, Don Redlich, Maxine Munt, Alfred Brooks, Liz Aggiss and Glen Tetley. Her technique stressed the importance of pulse, planes, floor patterns, aerial design, direction, and spatial dimensions. Holm's movement emphasized the freedom and flowing quality of the torso and back, but remained based on universal principles of physics for motion. Holm trained through improvisation so, a specific movement vocabulary or phrasing that could be carried on through classes does not exist; instead her focus was about learning through discovery. Choreographically her movement focused on the body's relation to space and emotion, which was an extension of Wigman and Rudolf Laban. She worked on movement that projected into space. Holm's stylistic idea was about "absolute dance" without pantomime or dramatic overtones. Attention to conveying an idea in her choreography was more important than the dancers' technical ability. Holm would say, "I want to see a sign of passion. I want to see the raw if struggling to express itself. A work must have blood."

Invited by dance director Martha Hill, Holm was one of the founding artists at Bennington College in 1934 along with Martha Graham, Charles Weidman, and Doris Humphrey, who came to be some of the most influential modern dancers of their time: "The Big Four". The American Dance Festival (ADF) arose from Bennington College. This was an opportunity for modern dancers to come together to take class and present new works. Holm's first major work, Trend, (1937) dealt with social criticism and incorporated Ausdruckstanz and American techniques. In 1941, she started a Center of Dance in Colorado Springs where she had summer courses and was able to perfect her creative exploration technique.

In 1948, she choreographed for Broadway: Ballet Ballads and Kiss Me, Kate which led to twelve other musicals. Holm's dance work Metropolitan Daily was the first modern dance composition to be televised on NBC, and her Labanotation score for Kiss Me, Kate (1948) was the first choreography to be copyrighted in the United States. She also choreographed Out of This World (1950), The Liar (1950), My Darlin' Aida (1952), The Golden Apple (1954), My Fair Lady (1956), Camelot (1960), and Anya (1965). She also directed a 1960s television musical adaptation of Pinocchio. Holm choreographed extensively in the fields of concert dance and musical theatre. Other works by Holm include: Tragic Exodus, They Too Are Exiles, Dance Of Work and Play and Dance Sonata

== As a dance educator ==
Hanya Holm's approach to teaching was to liberate each individual to define a technical style of his or her own that should express their inner personality and give freedom to explore. She would tell her students, "You have a perfect right to branch out, if you have the stuff in you, if you discover your own richness, if you have something to say." Holm's philosophy of teaching was how to find the essence of dance and understand where the movement comes from in the body that way it is a natural response in the dancer's body. She brought weltanschauung to her dance teaching. Holm was strict; she expected greatness from her students which would come from a willingness to work hard. It was her thought that if you worked hard and truly wanted it, you would achieve the desired outcome. Holm had an extremely keen eye, she had the ability to look at something and verbalize what she wanted using elaborate imagery and analogies. She used her technique class as a preparation for her improvisation and composition classes. These classes were where the students could expand and experiment on the skills that were presented in class, making the movement innate in their bodies. A large amount of Holm's choreography came from the improv and comp classes. Hanya Holm taught anatomy, Dalcroze eurhythmics, improvisation, and Labanotation at her school.

She taught at Colorado College, Mills College, University of Wisconsin, Alwin Nikolais School, and was the Head of Dance Department in New York's Musical Theatre Academy. After 1974, she taught at the Juilliard School (Martha Hill, director) in New York. In 1988, a documentary of her life Hanya: Portrait of a Pioneer narrated by Julie Andrews and Alfred Drake, and featuring interviews with Holm, Nikolais, Murray Louis, and others, was released by Dance Horizons.

== Family and death ==
Her son was Broadway lighting designer Klaus Holm. She and her son are interred in Hanover Township, Luzerne County, Pennsylvania. She was divorced from Reinhold Martin Kuntze, a German sculptor.

Holm has been honored by the National Dance Association, in 1976, with the Heritage Award for her contributions to dance education. She was inducted into the National Museum of Dance's Mr. & Mrs. Cornelius Vanderbilt Whitney Hall of Fame in 1988.

Holm died at the age of 99 of pneumonia on 3 November 1992 in New York City, New York.

== See also ==
- Women in dance

== Citations ==
- Craine, Debra; Mackrell, Judith, eds. (2000). "Hanya Holm". The Oxford Dictionary of Dance. New York: Oxford University Press. ISBN 978-0-19-860106-7.
- Cristofori, Marilyn (1998). "Hanya Holm". In Benbow-Pfalzgraf, Taryn (ed.). International Dictionary of Modern Dance. Detroit: St. James Press. ISBN 978-1-55862-359-0.
- Foulkes, Julia (2002). Modern Bodies: Dance and American Modernism from Martha Graham to Alvin Ailey. University of North Carolina Press. ISBN 978-0-8078-5367-2.
- Gitelman, Claudia; Forster, Marianne (1997). "Dance, Business, and Politics: Letters from Mary Wigman to Hanya Holm, 1930–1971". Dance Chronicle. 20 (1): 1–21. doi:10.1080/01472529708569264. ISSN 0147-2526. JSTOR 1567958.
- Reynolds, Nancy; McCormick, Malcolm, eds. (2003). "Hanya Holm". No Fixed Points: Dance in the Twentieth Century. Haven, CT: Yale University Press. ISBN 978-0-300-09366-7.
- Sorell, Walter (1969). Hanya Holm; the Biography of an Artist. Middletown, CT: Wesleyan University Press. ISBN 978-0-8195-6060-5.
