= Democrasoft =

- Type: Public
- Traded as: Expert Market: DEMO
- Industry: Patent monetization
- Headquarters: Santa Rosa, California, U.S.
- Area served: Worldwide
- Key people: Richard Lang (CEO)
- Products: Collaborize Classroom; Collaborize Workplace; Collaborize NPO
- Services: Educational Technology
- Website: democrasoft.com

Democrasoft, Inc., formerly Burst.com, is a public software company located in Santa Rosa, California.

== History ==
=== Burst.com ===
In March 2005 the company, then named Burst.com, received $60 million as settlement in its suit against Microsoft over unauthorized use of its streaming media technology.

In January 2006, Apple Computer filed an action for a Declaratory Judgement seeking to have Burst's patents declared invalid. In April 2006, Burst.com counterclaimed against Apple Computer with regard to Apple's potential infringement of Burst.com's patents on streaming video and time-shifting of video. A "Markman" Claim Construction Memorandum and Order favorable to Burst was issued May 8, 2007. In early November, the court invalidated 14 of Burst's claims, leaving 22 remaining.

On November 21, 2007, Apple Computer announced that it had called a truce in the legal feud between itself and Burst.com by agreeing to pay a $10 million lump sum in exchange for protection from current and future lawsuits.

RealNetworks sued Burst.com on January 3, 2008. The case was settled in May 2008 with RealNetworks agreeing to pay Burst a one-time payment of $533,500.00 cash in exchange for a license to a subset of the Burst patents.

=== Democrasoft, Inc. ===
As a result of the many lawsuits, Burst abandoned its video-related activities, auctioned many patents through Ocean Tomo, and shifted its focus on collaborative solutions. In 2010, the company launched Collaborize (online communications tool) at the Spring DEMO Conference and changed its name to Democrasoft. It later released Collaborize Classroom, an online learning platform that included the Collaborize Classroom Topic Library which featured subject based lessons for teachers.

On April 26, 2010, the company renamed from Burst.com to Democrasoft, Inc.

In August 2012, Democrasoft released WeJit, a tool for online collaboration, patented in March 2013, the same month the company was restructured into a privately held holding.
