= Richard Lang (CEO) =

- Occupation: Internet entrepreneur
- Employer: Democrasoft
- Notable work: Virtual Country: Strategy for 21st Century Democracy
- Website: democrasoft.com collaborizeclassroom.com

Richard Lang is the co-founder and chief executive officer of Democrasoft, established in 1989.

== Biography ==
In 1983, Lang co-invented a dual-deck VCR (videocassette recorder), for which a patent was issued, and co-founded the electronics company Go-Video, Inc.

In 1987, Lang developed (and later patented) "burst" mode, a technique intended to efficiently deliver video and audio programs over electronic networks. "Burst mode" has been used in the development of video-on-demand and audio-on-demand systems.

Lang is the author of Virtual Country - Strategy for 21st Century Democracy.
