= Plastic arts =

Art that involves physical manipulation

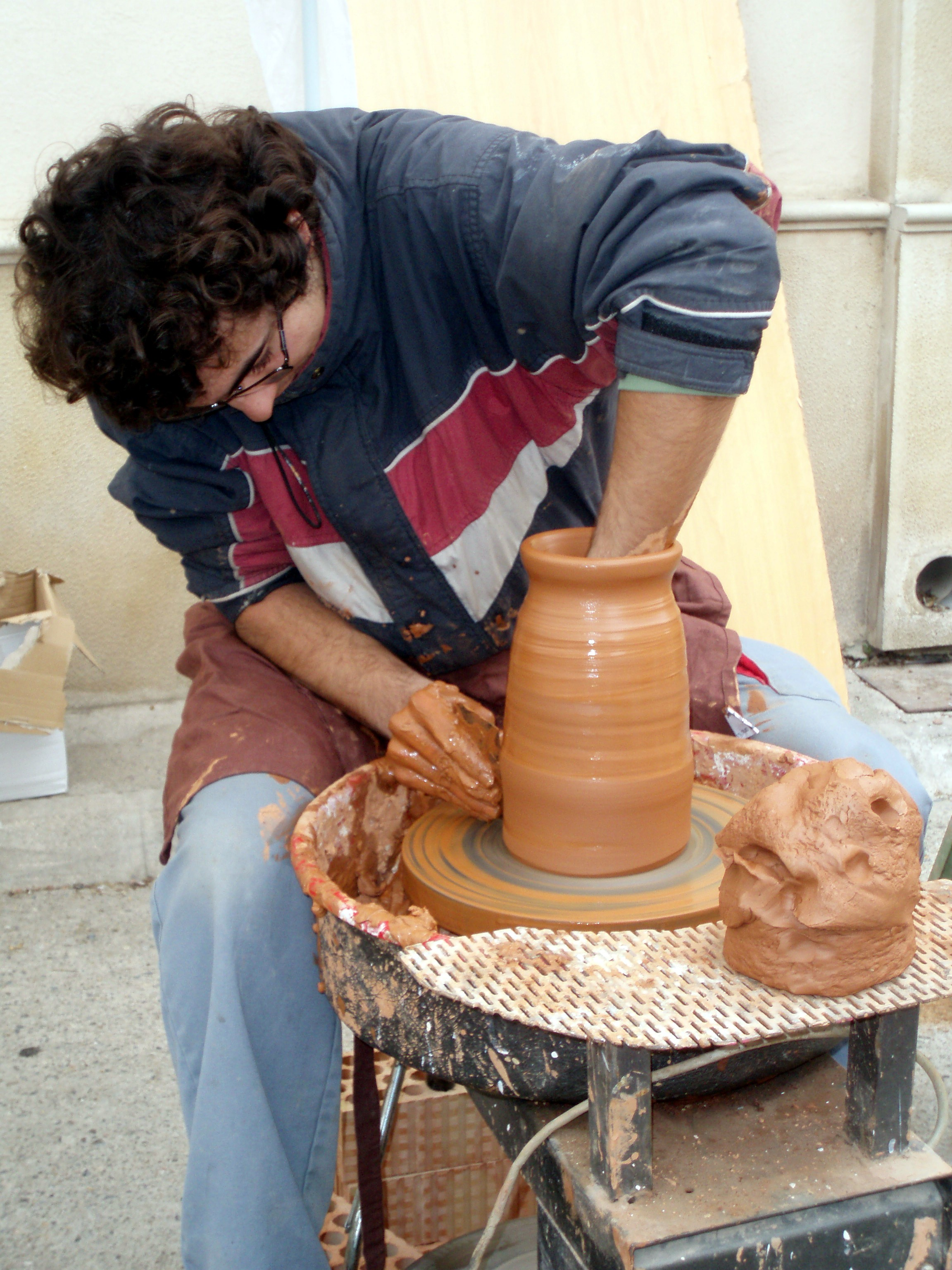
A ceramist moulding clay on a pottery wheel.

Plastic arts are art forms which involve physical manipulation of a plastic medium, such as clay, wax, paint – or even plastic in the modern sense of the word (a ductile polymer) – to create works of art. The term is used more generally to refer to the visual arts (such as painting, sculpture, ceramics, architecture, film and photography), rather than literature and music. Materials for use in the plastic arts, in the narrower definition, include those that can be carved or shaped, such as stone or wood, concrete, glass, or metal.

== History ==
The word plastic draws from the Ancient Greek πλαστικός (plastikós), which means "to mold" or "to shape". It has long preceded its dominant modern meaning as a synthetic material. The term plastic arts has been used historically to denote visual art forms (painting, sculpture, and ceramics) as opposed to literature or music.

The related terms plasticity and plasticism became more widely used in the early 20th century by critics discussing modern painting, particularly the works of Paul Cézanne.

The oldest known "plastic art" dates back to 30,000–34,000 BP.

== Application to literature ==
In contrast to the limiting of 'plastic arts' to sculpture and architecture by Friedrich Wilhelm Joseph Schelling in 1807, the German critic August Wilhelm Schlegel (1767–1845) applied the concept not only to visual arts, but also poetry.

Classical poetry lines he saw using plastic isolation, and rhyme falling under the Romantic (domain).

In Schlegel's Viennese lectures (1809–1811), published in 1827 as On the Theory and History of the Plastic Arts, he contrasted the plasticism of Classical Art with picturesque Romanticism:

[He] operated with the antinomy of terms plastic/pictorial, mechanically/ organically, finite/ infinite, and closed/accomplished. Schlegel stated that the spirit of the entire antique culture and poetry was plastic and that the spirit of modern culture, however, was picturesque (pittoresk)

== Gallery ==
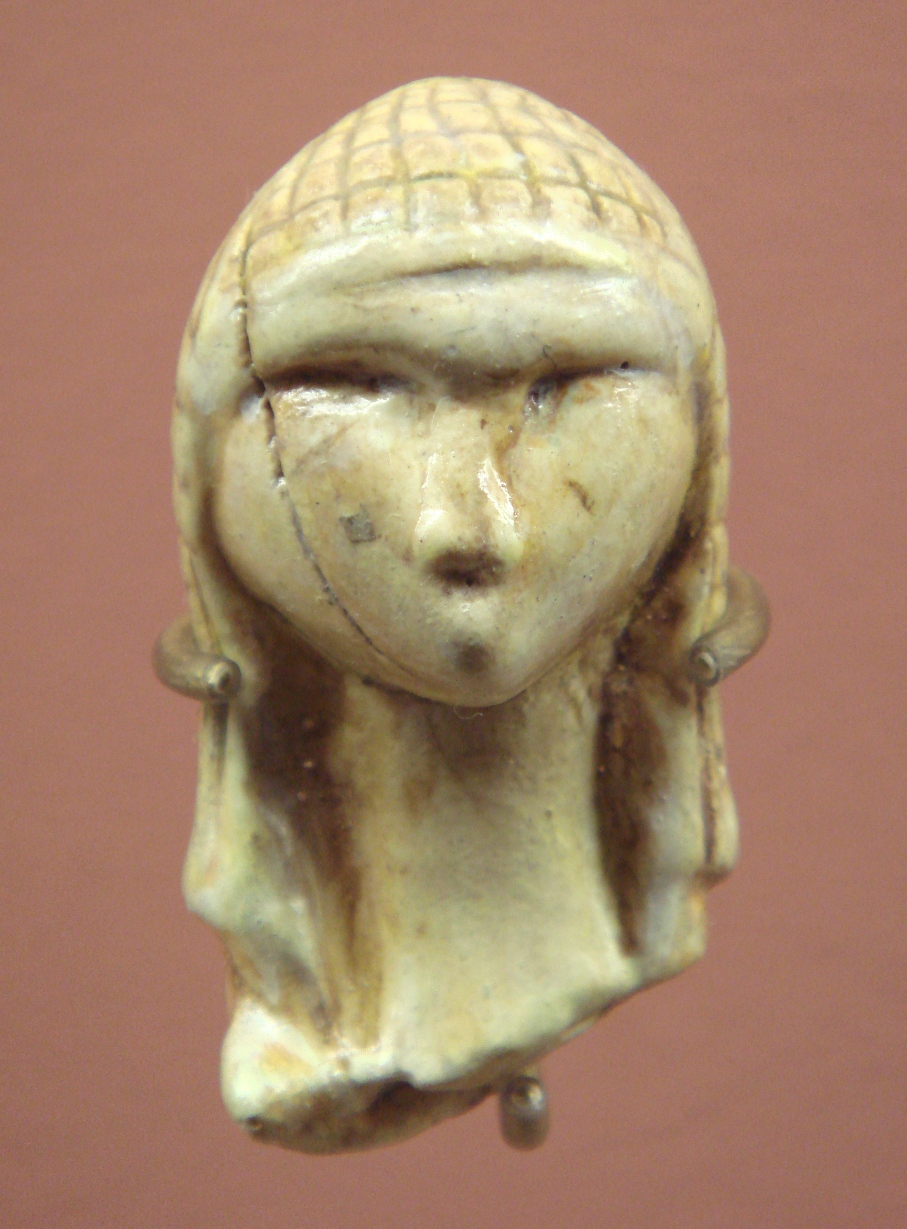
Venus de Brassempouy, a 25th millennium BC carving in mammoth ivory

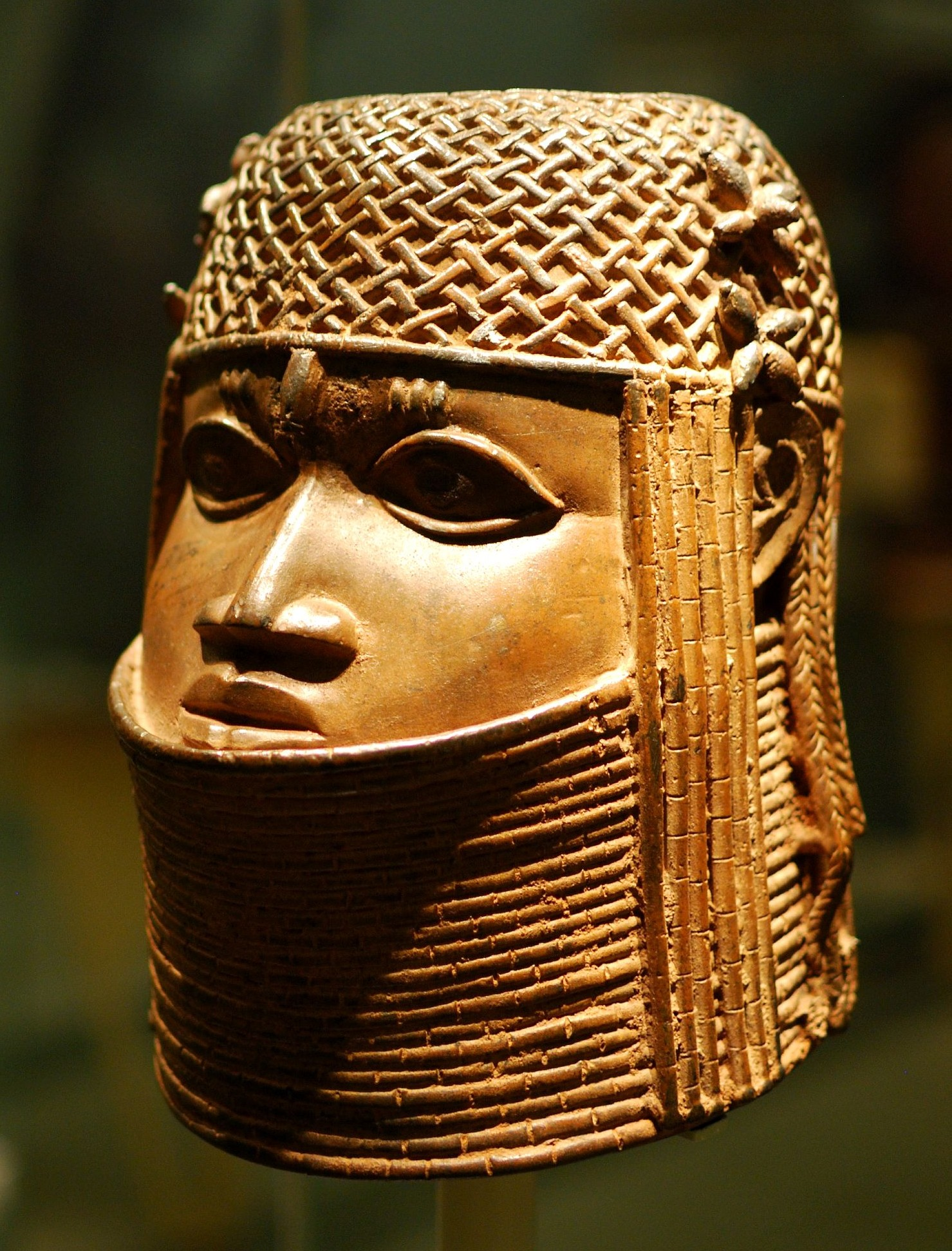
A 16th-century bronze sculpture from the Kingdom of Benin

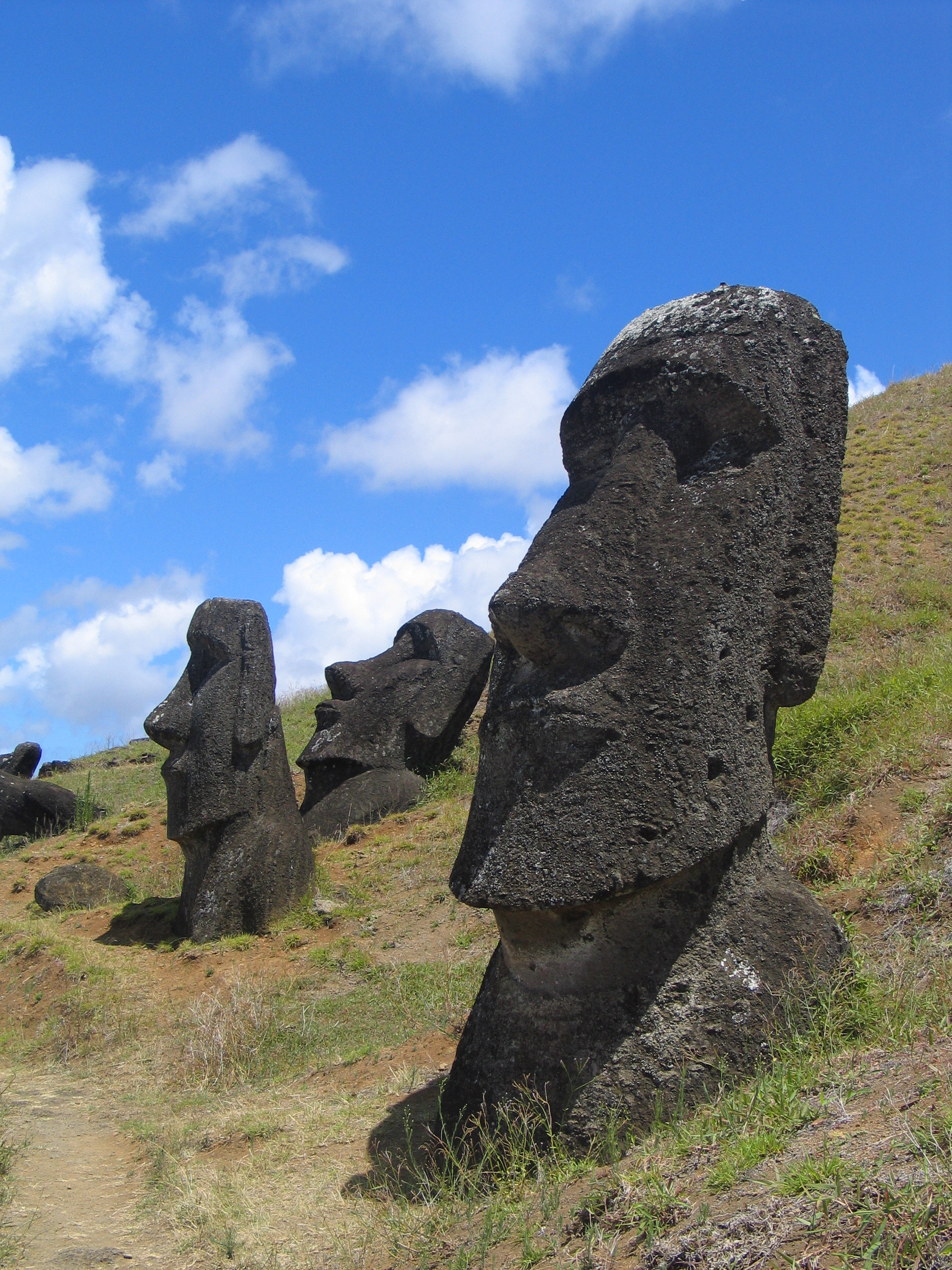
Moai, stone sculptures created by the Rapa Nui people

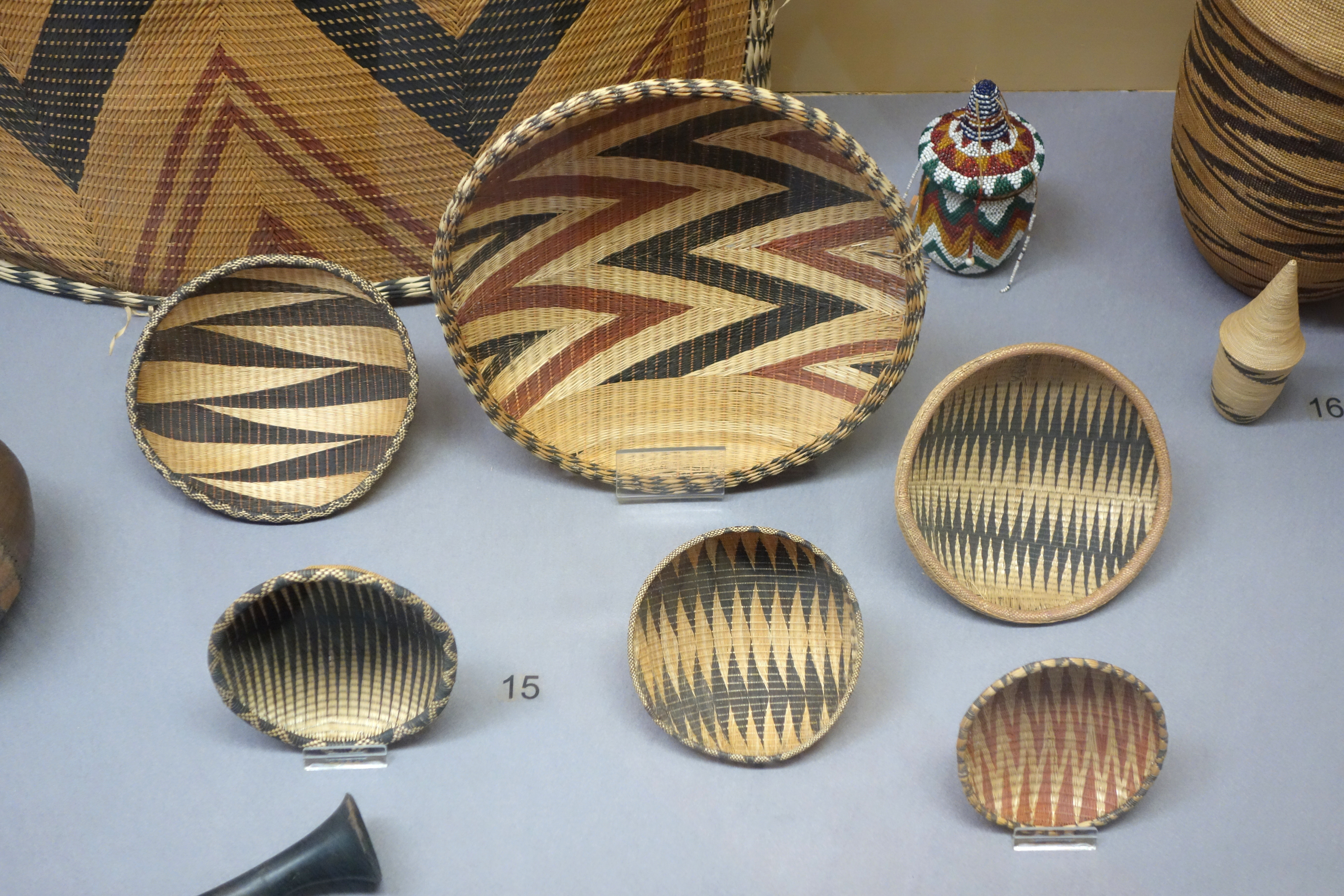
Woven baskets in Rwanda

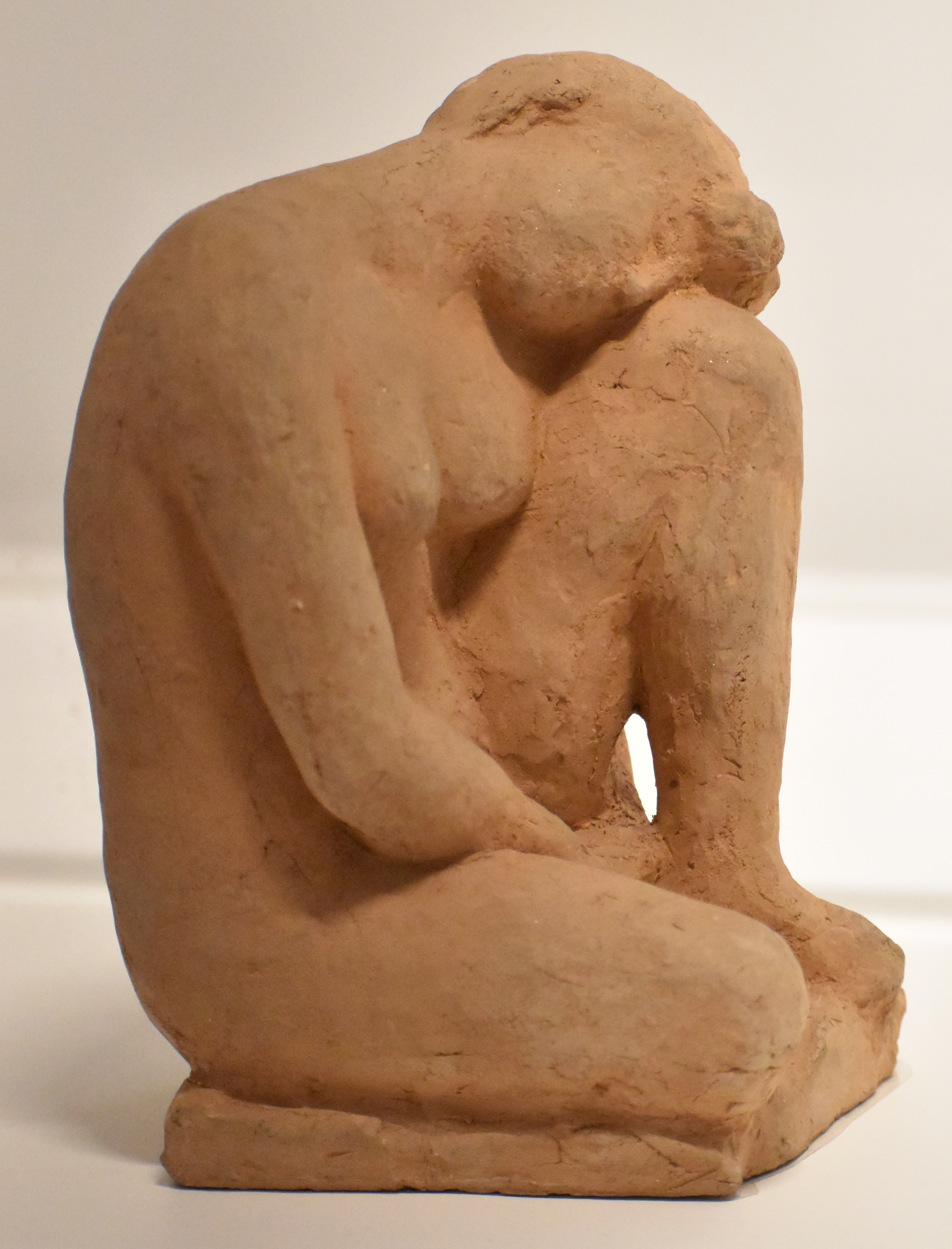
Sculpture in terracotta by Aristide Maillol

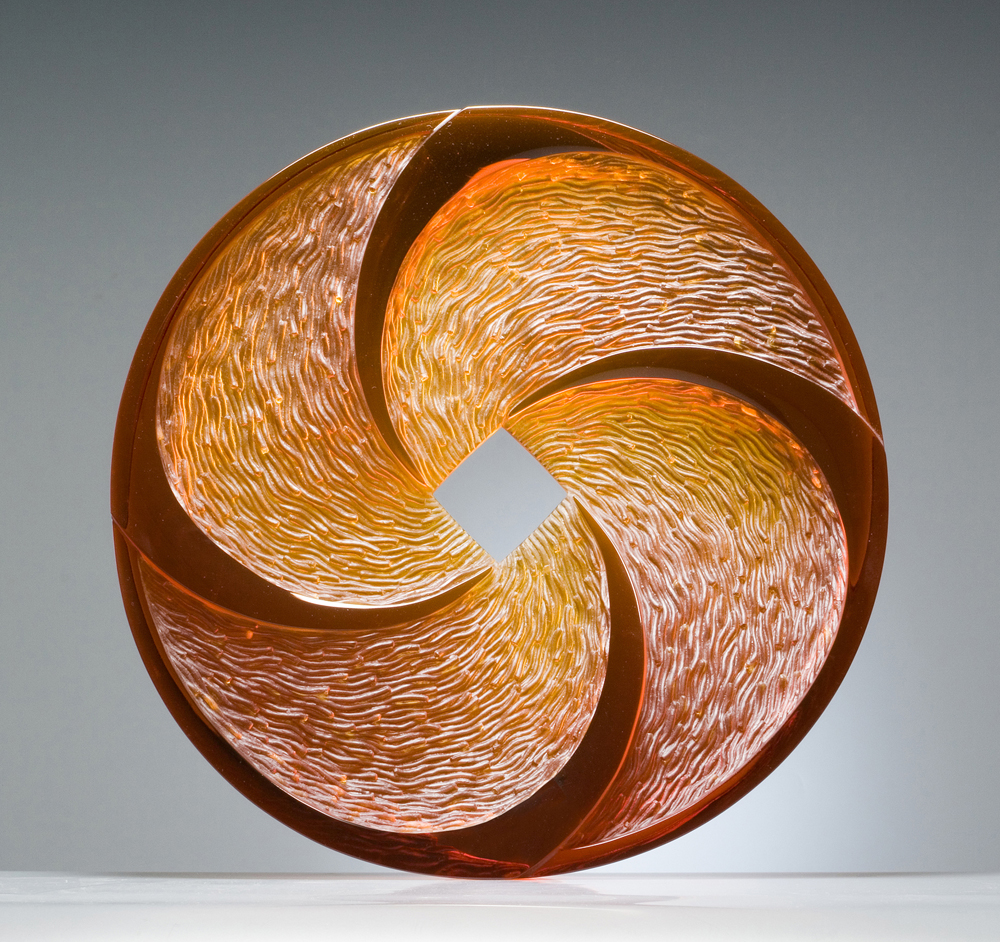
Glass art by Ivana Houserová

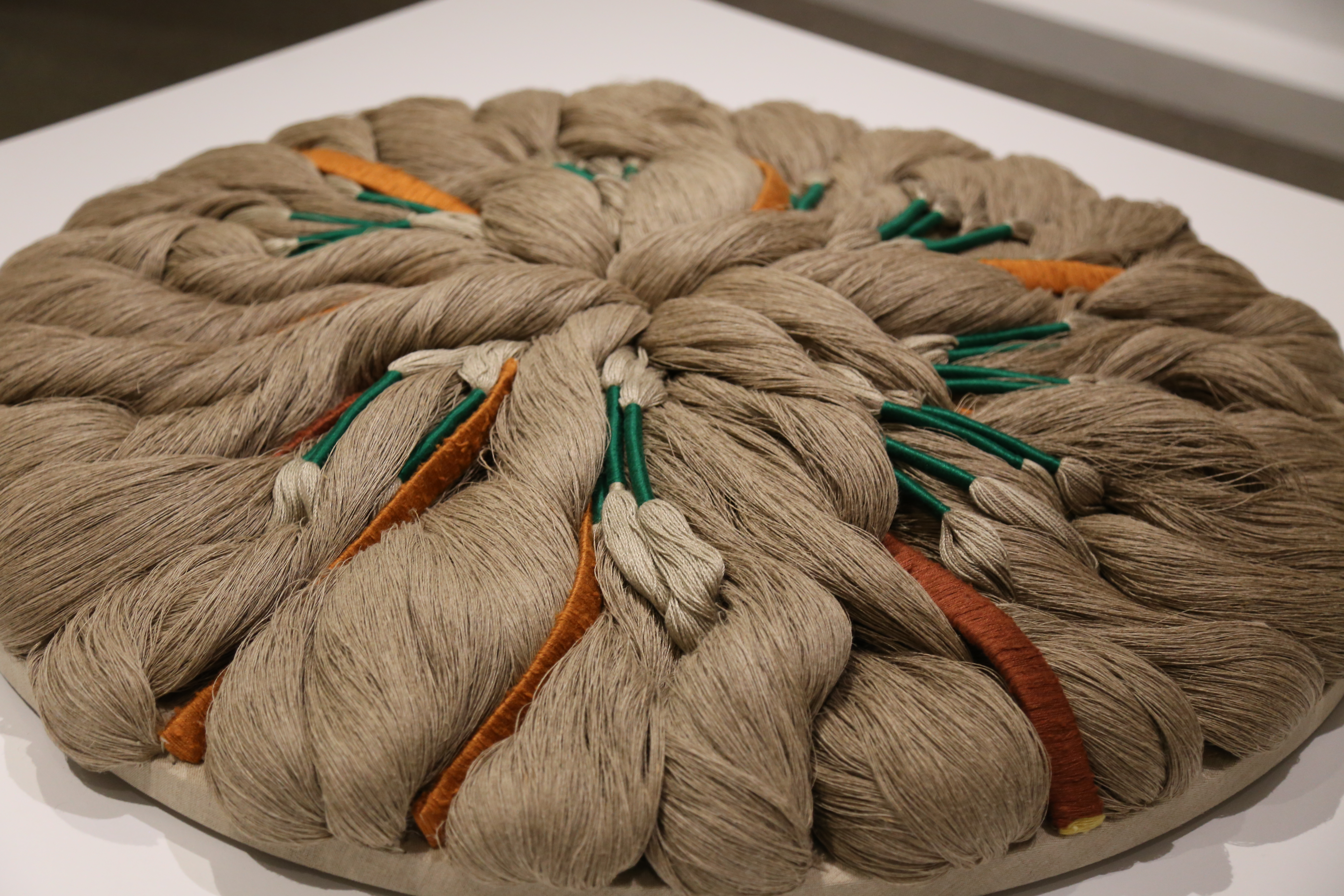
Hastings Visit to the Great Plains (1979), a tapestry in linen and cotton by Sheila Hicks

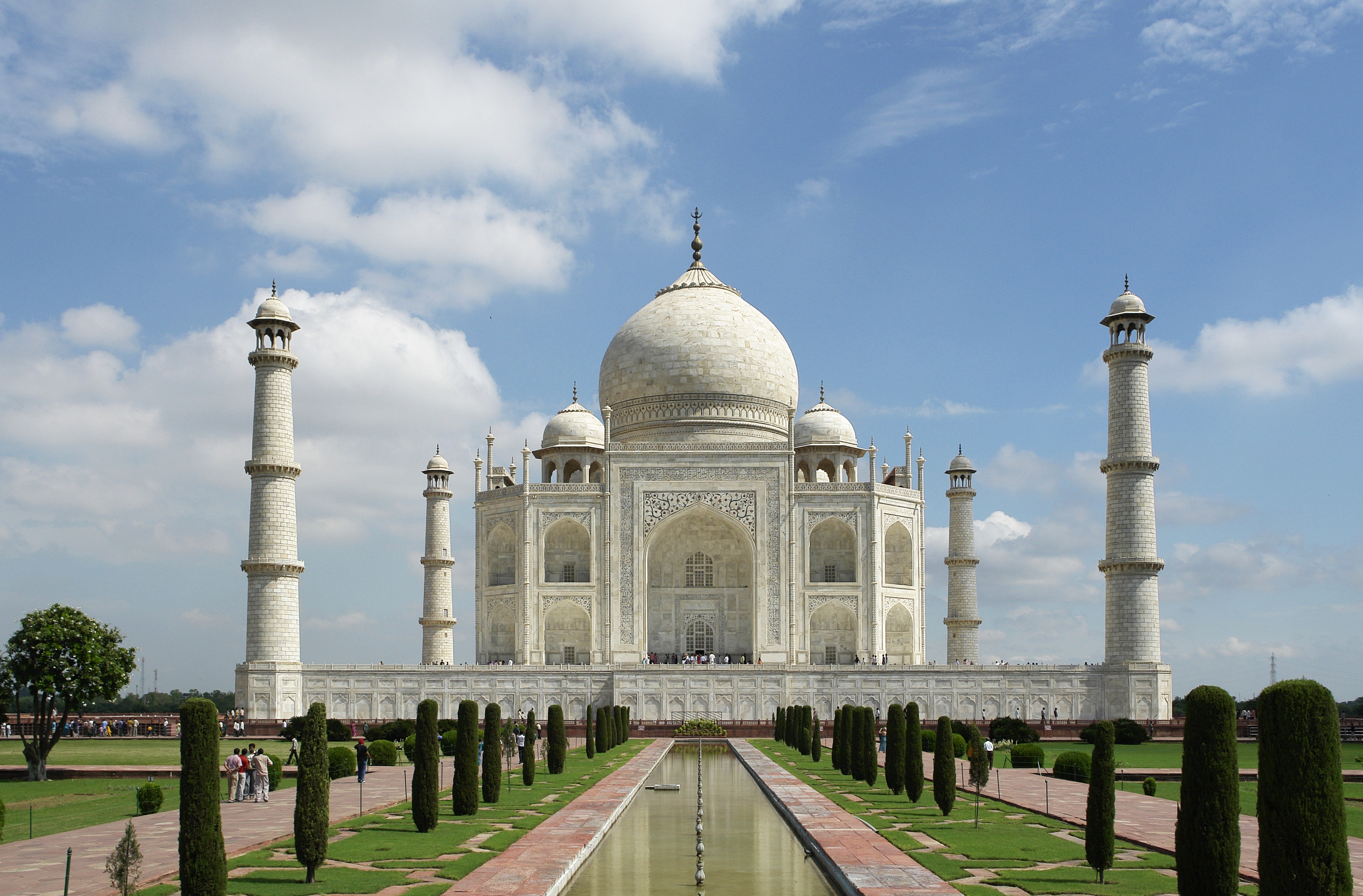
The Taj Mahal, an architectural work designed by Ustad Ahmad Lahori

Mona Lisa, an oil painting created by Leonardo da Vinci in the 15th century

== See also ==
- Art materials – Materials used to create works of art
- Handicraft – Item production made completely by hand or with simple tools
- Media (arts) – Materials used to create works of art
- Neoplasticism – Art theory espousing pure abstraction (according to Mondrian)
- Plastic in art – Use of synthetic materials to create art
- Visual arts – Art forms involving visual perception
