= Elizabeth Holmes Fisher =

American art collector (1867–1955)

- Born: September 13, 1867; Illinois
- Died: November 13, 1955 (aged 88); Santa Barbara, California, US
- Resting place: Glendale, California, US
- Occupation: Art collector
- Spouse: Walter Harrison Fisher

Elizabeth Holmes Fisher (September 13, 1867 – November 13, 1955) was an American art collector and the first woman elected to the University of Southern California’s board of trustees. She founded the USC Fisher Museum of Art in 1939.

Fisher was born in Illinois, the eldest of eight children. Her husband was businessman Walter Harrison Fisher. She died in Santa Barbara, California and was buried in Glendale, California.
