= Minoosh Zomorodinia =

Iranian-born American visual artist

- مینوش زمردی نیا
- Born: Raheleh Zomorodinia; Tehran, Pahlavi Iran
- Education: Islamic Azad University, San Francisco Art Institute
- Occupations: Visual artist, curator, educator
- Known for: Photography, video art, installation art, performance art
- Movement: Environmental art

Raheleh "Minoosh" Zomorodinia (Persian: مینوش زمردی نیا) is an Iranian-born American interdisciplinary visual artist, curator, and educator. She works in many mediums, including in photography, video, installation, and performance. Her work is informed by the tension between Iran and the United States, as well as explorations of the self, of home, nature, and the environment. She is based in the San Francisco Bay Area.

== Early life and education ==
Raheleh Zomorodinia was born in Tehran, Iran. She is a Muslim.

Zomorodinia received a BFA degree (1998) in Photography, and a MFA degree (2008) in Graphic Design, both degrees are from Islamic Azad University in Tehran, Iran. She had been a member of the Tehran-based Open Five Group (Persian: پنجه باز, romanized: Panje-Baz), an environmental artist collective at the Jehad Daneshgahi School.

Zomorodinia emigrated from Iran to the United States in 2009. She continued her studies and received an MFA degree (2015) in New Genres from the San Francisco Art Institute.

== Career ==
Zomorodinia's work looks at the relationships between nature, land, and technology. She often uses the act of walking as a medium in her artwork, and in some cases she has used tracking apps in order to create abstract shapes such as in the work "Golden Route 5" (2021). She is a member of the Zamin Project, a South/West Asia and North African (SWANA) artist collective.

=== Artwork ===
Zomorodinia was one of the twenty female Iranian artists included in the group exhibition, "Nietzsche Was A Man" (2015) curated by Alysse Stepanian and Neda Darzi, at the Pori Art Museum in Pori, Finland.

Her work "Between Heaven and Earth" (2015), a video art installation with performance exploring the idea of "self" in a natural landscape, was shown at the Gallery Route One in Point Reyes Station, California.

In 2017, she was part of the inaugural Transform Fest, a performance arts festival held at the Yerba Buena Center for the Arts; other artists included Larry Arrington, Sandra Lawson Ndu, Embodiment Project dance company, Fauxnique (drag name for Monique Jenkinson), Fogbeast dance company, RAWdance dance company, and Jesse Hewit.

In her two-channel video, installed artwork "Sensation" (2016–2018), Zomorodinia is standing in nature with a safety blanket blowing in the strong winds. The work was shown in the group exhibition, Once at Present: Contemporary Art of Bay Area Iranian Diaspora (2019) at the Minnesota Street Project, curated by Kevin B. Chen and Taraneh Hemami.

=== Curatorial projects ===
In January 2020, Hofreh, was curated by Zomorodinia at San Francisco’s Peephole Cinema (at 280 Orange Alley in the Mission District), with six silent films by contemporary Iranian video artists.

In 2020, Emotional Numbness: The impact of war on the human psyche and ecosystems curated by Zomorodinia, was held at Platform 3, Tehran, Iran, with Atefeh Khas.

In May to June 2022, Between Lands exhibition curated by Zomorodinia, was held at Southern Exposure art space in San Francisco, California.

In October to December 2023, Transcending Physicality: The Essence of Place exhibition curated by Zomorodinia, was held at San Francisco Arts Commission in San Francisco, California.

=== Public collections ===
Zomorodinia's work is part of the public collection at the Nevada Museum of Art.

== Awards and honors ==
Zomorodinia has been awarded many artist-in-residencies, most notably at the Ox-Bow Artists Residency (2018), Djerassi Artists Residency (2016), Recology Artists Residency (2021), Local Language (2021), Lucas Artist Fellow at Montalvo Arts Center (2023–2025), Headlands Center for the Arts (2016–2019), and the Santa Fe Art Institute (2017–2018).

Zomorodinia is a 2023 YBCA 100 honoree, awarded by Yerba Buena Center for the Arts.

== See also ==
- List of Iranian women artists
