= Maxine Munt =

American dancer, educator (1912–2000)

Maxine Phyllis Munt
- Born: September 18, 1912; Omaha, Nebraska, United States
- Died: February 22, 2000 (aged 87); Denver, Colorado, United States
- Other names: Maxine Munt Brooks, Maxine Munt Pew, Maxine Brooks
- Education: University of Nebraska Omaha (BA)
- Spouse: Alfred Brooks (married 1950–2000; her death)

Maxine Phyllis Munt (September 18, 1912 – February 22, 2000), American dancer, and dance educator. She was a co-founder of a modern dance company called Munt–Brooks Dance Studio, an early influencer of counterculture, and later a co-founder of the experimental theatre group, the Changing Scene Theatre. She also went by the names Maxine Munt Brooks, and Maxine Munt Pew.

== Early life and education ==
Maxine Phyllis Munt was born on September 18, 1912, in Omaha, Nebraska. Her parents were Blanche Beale (née Bartley) and John Charles Munt.

She graduated from the University of Nebraska Omaha. Additional dance studies were done at Bennington School of the Dance at Bennington College in Bennington, Vermont; Colorado College in Colorado Springs; the University of Wisconsin; and private study under Mary Wigman.

== Career ==
Munt taught dance at the University of North Dakota, and later served as the founding dance department head and instructor at Adelphi College (now Adelphi University) in Garden City on Long Island, New York. Munt also was a professional modern dancer and taught dance with Hanya Holm at the Hanya Holm Studio in New York City. It was at Holm's studio that Munt met Alfred Brooks, who was a student.

The partnership between Brooks and Munt started in the summer of 1948, they had co-directed a dance workshop at the creative arts center of Adelphi College. They founded in 1952 the Munt–Brooks Dance Studio (or Munt–Brooks Dance Company) in New York City. In September 1950, the couple married in Paris, France.

In 1968, Brooks and Munt opened "Changing Scene" (or "Changing Scene Theatre"), a non-profit, theatre/dance school in Denver, after closing the Munt-Brooks Dance Studio a few years prior. Everything was volunteer based and was devoted to presenting dance and theatre as well as new work in all media.

In the summer of 1999, she had surgery on her knees and intestines. Munt died on February 22, 2000, in Denver, Colorado, and was survived by her husband. The Changing Scene Theatre closed a month before her death. Her archives are held at the Denver Public Library.
