= Theodore Odza =

American artist (1915–1998)

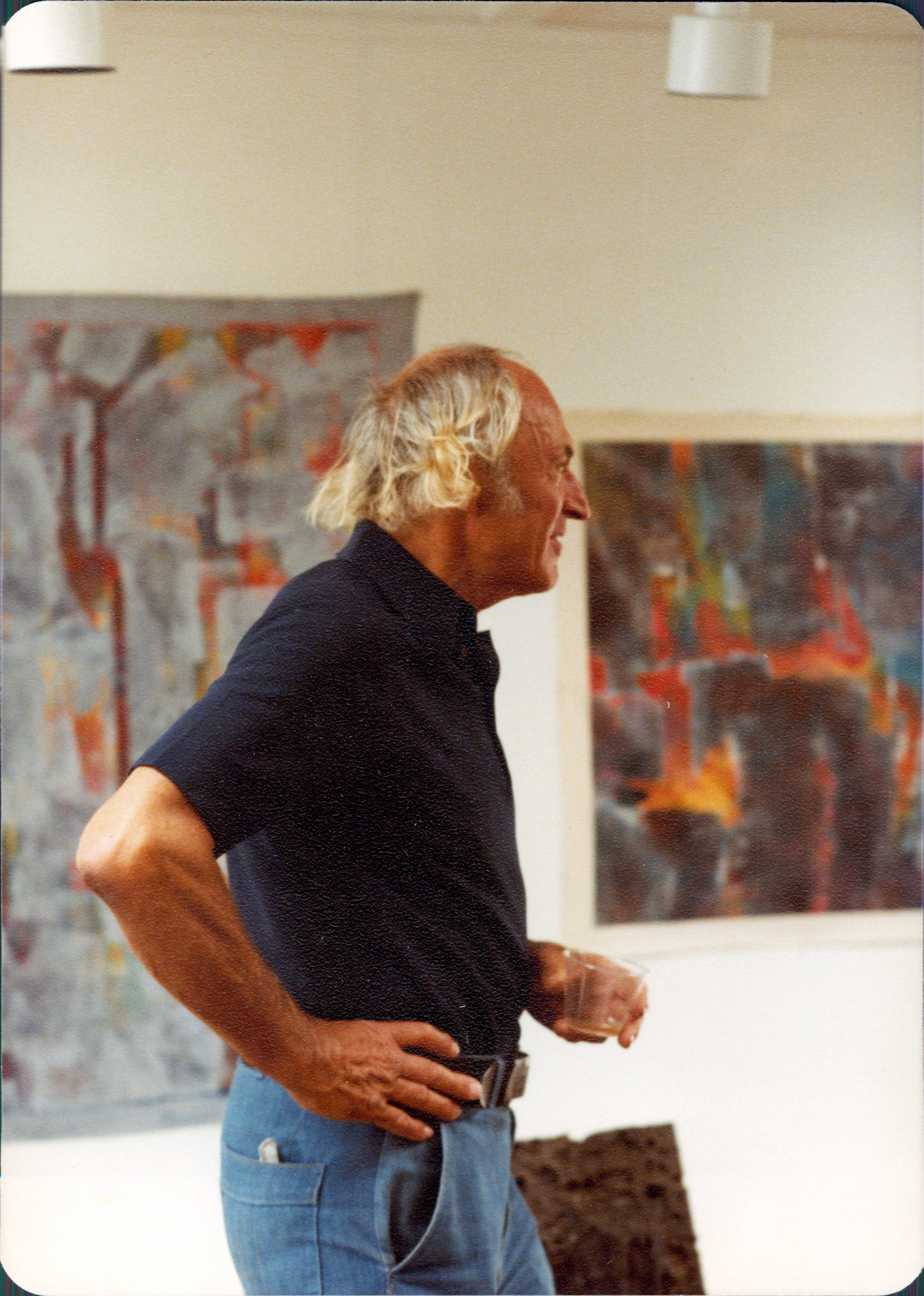
- Born: January 7, 1915; New York City, New York, U.S.
- Died: February 19, 1998 (aged 83); Inverness, California, U.S.
- Monuments: Abstract expressionism
- Other name: Ted Odza
- Education: University of California, Berkeley
- Occupations: Sculptor, painter, curator, educator

Theodore "Ted" Odza (1915–1998) was an American artist, curator, and educator, known for his sculptures and abstract paintings. He taught art classes at University of California, Berkeley, and later served as the chair of the art department of Laney College. Additionally, he curated multiple national touring art exhibitions of Central European artists.

== Biography ==
Theodore Odza was born on January 7, 1915, in New York City. His father Herbert G. Odza, was born in Halych, Ukraine; and his mother Lena (née Fischman) was born in New York City. There were six children in the family, five brothers and one sister.

Odza graduated (B.A. 1959 and M.A. 1961, 1963) from University of California, Berkeley, where he studied under Sidney Gordin, Harold Paris, and Wilfrid Zogbaum.

In the 1960s and 1970s, he made abstract expressionist metal sculptures, often constructed with steel or bronze.

In 1963 to 1964, Odza taught at the Academy of Fine Arts in Warsaw (Polish: Akademia Sztuk Pięknych w Warszawie). During his time in Poland he created many new artist connections, and in the following years he curated national touring art exhibitions of Central European artists. Most notably, he curated the exhibition Contemporary Painters from Hungary (1985) at Gallery Route One.

Odza's work can be found in public museum art collections include San Francisco Museum of Modern Art, and Oakland Museum of California.

== Personal life ==
Odza was married in 1940 to dancer Mimi Kagan, which ended in divorce in 1958. Odza married Janice Marie Gale Johnson in 1962.

== Exhibitions ==
- September 1963 – Ted Odza and Mildred Lachman, Quay Gallery, San Francisco, California
- October 1963 – solo exhibition of metal sculpture, Richmond Art Center, Richmond, California
- June 1964 – solo exhibition, Gallery of Contemporary Art in Warsaw, Warsaw, Poland
- February–April 1982 – Theodore Odza - Welded Steel Sculpture, Palo Alto Art Center, Palo Alto, California
- July 1982 – Theodore Odza Sculpture, Douglas Elliott gallery, San Francisco, California
