= Marin Arts Council =

Marin Arts Council logo

The Marin Arts Council was an arts organization based in Marin County, California, United States. In 2009 it faced significant funding challenges following reductions in support from the Marin Community Foundation. In 2011 it was involved in curating and organizing local art exhibits including shows at the Marin Civic Center. By 2011 the organization had undergone significant downsizing, including the elimination of its executive director position and a shift towards operating primarily with volunteers. The Marin Arts Council ceased operations in 2011.

== Activities ==
The Marin Arts Council supported local arts initiatives and community programming in Marin County. In 2004, the organization provided grant funding for the "Different Folks with Different Strokes Storytelling Program". The council also supported community arts and education initiatives in Marin County and the surrounding region. The organization was among the funders of prison arts programming described in a newspaper feature on arts education at San Quentin State Prison. Former Larkspur mayor, Charles "Chuck" Curley, who served as president of the council in the early 1980's, and his wife deeded a collection of Marin County arts and crafts to the organization in 2003.

== Closure ==
The Marin Arts Council was run under the California state arts council, the California Arts Council (CAC). Due to a lack of funding, the Council was closed.

In 2017 MarinArts was established as a county wide arts resource to support the local arts community.
