= Go-Video =

American electronics company

Go-Video, Inc.
- Founded: 1983; United States
- Founder: Terren Dunlap; Richard Lang
- Headquarters: United States
- Number of locations: International
- Area served: Worldwide

Go-Video, Inc., was an electronics company that manufactured dual-deck VHS recorders for home use. The company was founded in 1983 by Terren Dunlap and Richard Lang as a solution for professionally duplicating videotapes for weddings, reunions and business presentations. The general idea was to have a mobile van that could produce same-day duplications, thus the name Go-Video. The idea later transformed into the concept of production manufacturing. Go-Video applied for its dual-deck technology patent in 1984 and received it four years later. In 1987 Go-Video had almost settled a production deal with Japanese manufacturer NEC, only to find out NEC declined any production of a dual-deck recorder after a meeting with Japan's Electronic Industry Association. Dunlap filed a lawsuit against Japanese manufacturers and was awarded settlements of some $2 million. In 1989 South Korean electronics company Samsung agreed to manufacture the dual-deck units given the stipulation that they themselves could manufacture and market dual-deck players under the Samsung brand. The VCR 2 (GV-2000) was finally released with a $995 price tag.
