= Alfred Brooks (dancer) =

American dancer, choreographer, musician (1916–2005)

- Born: Alfred Brooks Pew; October 19, 1916; Kansas City, Missouri, U.S.
- Died: December 15, 2005 (aged 89); Denver, Colorado, U.S.
- Other names: Al Brooks
- Education: Juilliard School (BA, MA), University of Virginia
- Occupation(s): Dancer, choreographer, pianist, stage actor
- Known for: founder of Munt-Brooks Dance Studio, founder of Changing Scene Theatre
- Spouse: Maxine Phyllis Munt (married 1950–2000; her death)

Alfred Brooks Pew (October 19, 1916 – December 15, 2005), better known by his stage name Alfred Brooks, was an American dancer, choreographer, pianist, and stage actor. He was a co-founder of a modern dance company called Munt–Brooks Dance Studio, an early influencer of counterculture, and later a co-founder of the experimental theatre group, the Changing Scene Theatre.

== Early life and education ==
Alfred Brooks Pew was born on October 19, 1916, in Kansas City, Missouri, the youngest of five children born to Maysie Virginia (née Pittman) and John Brooks Pew.

Brooks attended the University of Virginia; followed by study at the performing arts conservatory Juilliard School in New York City, where he graduated with B.A and M.A. degrees in musical composition. At Juilliard he studied under Carl Friedberg, as well as additional private study under Roy Harris, and Nadia Boulanger of Paris.

Brooks was first exposed to modern dance in college, and he studied dance under Hanya Holm. He met his future wife Maxine Phyllis Munt at the Hanya Holm Studio, where she was teaching dancing. Munt was a graduate of the University of Nebraska Omaha, and she also taught dance at the University of North Dakota, and later served as the founding dance department head and instructor at Adelphi College (now Adelphi University) in Garden City on Long Island, New York.

== Career ==
During World War II, Brooks was a major in the United States Air Force and performed musicals with Armed Forces Entertainment both nationally and internationally for the United States Armed Forces. Some of his performances during his military service included Paul Green's Tread the Green Grass (1932), and Gordon Jenkins' Heaven Come Wednesday.

The partnership of Brooks and Munt started in the summer of 1948, they had co-directed a dance workshop at the creative arts center of Adelphi College. Brooks and Munt founded in 1952 the Munt–Brooks Dance Studio (or Munt–Brooks Dance Company) in New York City. In September 1950, the couple married in Paris, France.

In 1968, Brooks and Munt opened the non-profit, theatre/dance school called the "Changing Scene" (or "Changing Scene Theatre") in Denver, Colorado, after closing the Munt-Brooks Dance Studio a few years prior. Everything was volunteer based and was devoted to presenting not just dance and theatre but new work in all media. The Changing Scene was the first to have featured profanity, nudity and sexual situations on a Denver stage, and in 1968 they were raided by the Denver vice squad because, Brooks said, "officers misunderstood what an offering called "Organum" must have been about".

Brooks was a co-founder of the Colorado Theatre Guild.

After Maxine Munt's death in January 2000, the Changing Scene closed. The Changing Scene influenced a new generation of bohemian theatre including the "Changing Scene Northwest", created by a former board member after they moved to Washington.
