= Louise Kloepper =

American dancer and dance educator

- Born: January 10, 1910; Washington, D.C.
- Died: December 15, 1996 (aged 86); Madison, Wisconsin
- Occupations: Dancer, dance educator

Louise Olga Kloepper (January 10, 1910 – December 15, 1996) was an American dancer and dance educator, chair of the dance program at the University of Wisconsin.

== Early life and education ==
Louise Olga Kloepper was born in Washington, D.C. and raised in Tacoma, Washington, the daughter of Henry August Kloepper and Louise Nigel Kloepper. Kloepper attended high school in Tacoma and performed in recitals there with her sister Millie. She trained as a dancer in Seattle and in New York City.

In 1929, Kloepper traveled to Germany to pursue further dance studies with Margarete Wallmann and Mary Wigman in Berlin and Dresden. She was the first American student to earn a diploma from the Wigman school. In 1942, she enrolled as a dance student at the University of Wisconsin, but quickly became an instructor and director of the student dance club, working with Margaret H'Doubler as her mentor. "I was teaching courses I was supposed to be taking and that was a little confusing to the deans," she later recalled. She earned a bachelor's degree in dance at Wisconsin in 1946, at age 36.

== Career ==
Kloepper was a dancer and teacher with the Hanya Holm School and Dance Company in New York, from 1932 to 1942. She also taught at Columbia University and New York University during those years, and toured with Holm's company. In 1938 she was a fellow at the Bennington summer dance school, where she created three dances. John Martin, dance critic from the New York Times, raved that "Here is a young dancer of remarkable gifts with an inherent beauty of movement," adding that "There is apparently no limitation to her command of her medium, and she is possessed particularly of that rarest of endowments, a controlled legato."

Kloepper taught with Holm and Marian van Tuyl at Mills College in the summers of 1939 and 1940. She joined the faculty of the Department of Physical Education for Women at the University of Wisconsin in 1946. She became chair of the dance division in 1963, and a full professor in 1969. She retired from the university in 1975. In 1976, 1978, and 1979, she gave a series of oral history interviews to the UW-Madison Oral History Program. In 1984, she was the first recipient of the Wisconsin Dance Council Award. In 1985, her work appeared in a documentary film, Hanya: Portrait of a Pioneer.

== Personal life ==
Kloepper lived in Madison in her retirement, in a house designed by William Wesley Peters, apprentice and son-in-law to Frank Lloyd Wright. She died in 1996, aged 86, in Madison, Wisconsin. A few weeks after her death, on what would have been her 87th birthday, there was a chamber concert held in her memory, at the Unitarian meeting house in Madison. The University of Wisconsin offered a Louise O. Kloepper Dance Scholarship, and there is an annual Kloepper Concert of new student works held on campus, in the Louise Kloepper Studio.
