= Gallery Route One =

Cultural center in Pt Reyes Station, California

- Formation: 1981; 45 years ago
- Type: nonprofit art center
- Location: 11101 Highway One, Ste. 1101 Point Reyes Station, CA 94956
- Website: galleryrouteone.org

Gallery Route One is a non-profit arts organization in Point Reyes Station, California. It was founded in 1983 by a group of artists from the area. It is a membership based organization with public outreach, educational, and juried exhibition programming.

== History ==
Gallery Route One was founded in 1983 by a group of 25 artists from the Marin Headlands region.

According to the website, the organization's mission is: "To originate and present contemporary art exhibitions, educational programs, and community outreach in order to inspire people to experience the world in new ways."

== Programs ==
Gallery programs have included: Artists in Schools, which includes exhibiting local student artworks, the Latino Photography Project, Fellowships for Young Artists, and exhibitions focused on international artists such as the 1985 Contemporary Painters from Hungary.

== Exhibitions ==
Gallery Route One produces an annual Box Show and a Northern California Open juried exhibition.

The gallery has a history of focusing on environmentally themed exhibitions. These include solo exhibitions such as the 2001 Disposal Truths by Richard Lang and Judith Selby Lang, several exhibitions of the non-profit Women Eco Artists Dialog, Eco Echos: Unnatural Selections in 2019, and the 2021 Searching for Meaning by the California Society of Printmakers.

In a 2001 review of Richard Lang and Judith Selby Lang's exhibition Disposable Truths, Barbara Morris wrote, "Disposable Truths serves the purpose of making a statement about the way we interact with our environment while taking small steps in a positive direction. Selby and Lang have produced an unassuming and thoughtful show which quietly reflects on the current state of our species."

About the 2002 exhibition Turning the Tables, Artweek writer Barbara Morris stated, "Gallery Route One in Point Reyes Station organized an ambitious collection of exhibitions, performances and events exploring the 'environmental impact of growing, distributing, consuming and appreciating food.'" Morris continued, "Turning the Tables brought together artists and farmers and diverse populations to explore common ground upon which all their interests intersect. The community of Point Reyes used the numerous events—ranging from garden tours to plein air paint-into celebrate its creative energy, a rich farming tradition and a collaborative spirit, while spreading the message of conscious living in the greater community."

Significant artists who have shown at Gallery Route One include: Binh Dahn, Linda MacDonald, Andrew Romanoff, Judith Selby Lang, Sharon Siskin, Inez Storer, Theodore Odza, Mary B. White, and Minoosh Zomorodinia among others.
