= Tess Felix =

American artist and environmental activist

Tess Felix is an American artist known for life-size portraits made from found beach plastic.

== Early life ==
Tess Felix was born in California and grew up in a Northern California coastal environment. Prior to becoming an artist, Felix was a hairstylist for film and theatre.

== Career ==
Felix began working with beach plastic in 2010. She create portraits out of bits of plastic waste using a mosaic process.

Abigail Richardson explains Felix's art, "After a major storm, Tess Felix found her local beach covered in plastic debris, making her aware of the magnitude of the plastic pollution in the ocean. Tess’s art form shifted that day. She began to assemble large portraits of her eco heroes from the plastic she collected on the beach. In making these portraits, she not only creates beautiful works of art from items such as discarded plastic toys, lighters, and empty water bottles, but also reminds the viewer of the throwaway culture we live in. Her hope is to inspire us to change our habits and ask ourselves, 'How much plastic do we really need to use?'"

In their research paper, "Making visible, rendering obscure: reading the plastic crisis through contemporary artistic visual representations," Ekaterina Chertkovskaya, Karl Holmberg, Moa Petersén, Johannes Stripple and Sara Ullström write about Felix's Eco Heroes series as, "works that politicize the plastic crisis through the creative process itself, turning what would otherwise be plastic waste into an art object. There is impact in the transformation of this utterly common waste material into something beautiful, or in some cases absurd. The process of transformation demonstrates great skill and creativity—a lavishing of care on a material that is normally considered valueless."

Felix and her work have been featured at Expo Mer Fujisawa, Bioneers, and Mill Valley Fall Arts Festival, and in The Ocean Advocates: Inspiring Change, a documentary by Andrea Leland and Cynthia Abbott, Every Second Breath Film Festival, Musings Magazine, Spaces Magazine, Marin Magazine, Entanglements, and Artworks for Change.

== Solo exhibitions ==
- Portraits in Beach Plastic, Stinson Beach Gallery, Stinson Beach, California, 2012
- Portraits in Beach Plastic, The Bolinas Museum, Bolinas, California, 2012
- Tess Felix: Crisis, Peninsula Museum of Art, Millbrae, California, 2019
