= USC Fisher Museum of Art =

- Established: 1939
- Location: 823 Exposition Boulevard, Los Angeles, CA 90089 (by USC campus)
- Coordinates: 34.0186°N 118.2873°W
- Type: Art museum, University of Southern California
- Director: Selma Holo
- Website: fisher.usc.edu

USC Fisher Museum of Art, formerly USC Fisher Gallery, which is affiliated with the University of Southern California, is the first art museum established in the city of Los Angeles. Founded in 1939 by Elizabeth Holmes Fisher, she donated 29 paintings at the beginning. When she died in 1955, the collection had grown to 74 paintings, drawings and sculptures by European and North American artists. In 1955, Armand Hammer donated to the museum a collection of 48 works by Dutch, Flemish, German, and Italian masters of the fifteenth through seventeenth centuries. In recent years, the 20th and 21st centuries collections are growing fast, not only in size, but in scope. The later collections span the medias of painting, prints, drawings, photography, and sculpture.

Highlights of the collections include: Venus Wounded by a Thorn (ca. 1608-1610) by Peter Paul Rubens, St. John the Evangelist (1618-1620) by Anthony van Dyck (attributed to), Isabella Hunter formerly Mrs. Anne Downman (ca. 1776-1790) by Angelica Kauffmann, Emma, Lady Hamilton by George Romney, Mrs. Burroughs (1769) by Thomas Gainsborough, Femme Etandant Son Linge by Jean-François Millet, Richard Nixon (1972) by Andy Warhol, and Blacklist (1999) by Jenny Holzer.
