= Hawaiian art =

Art in Hawaii and by Hawaiian artists

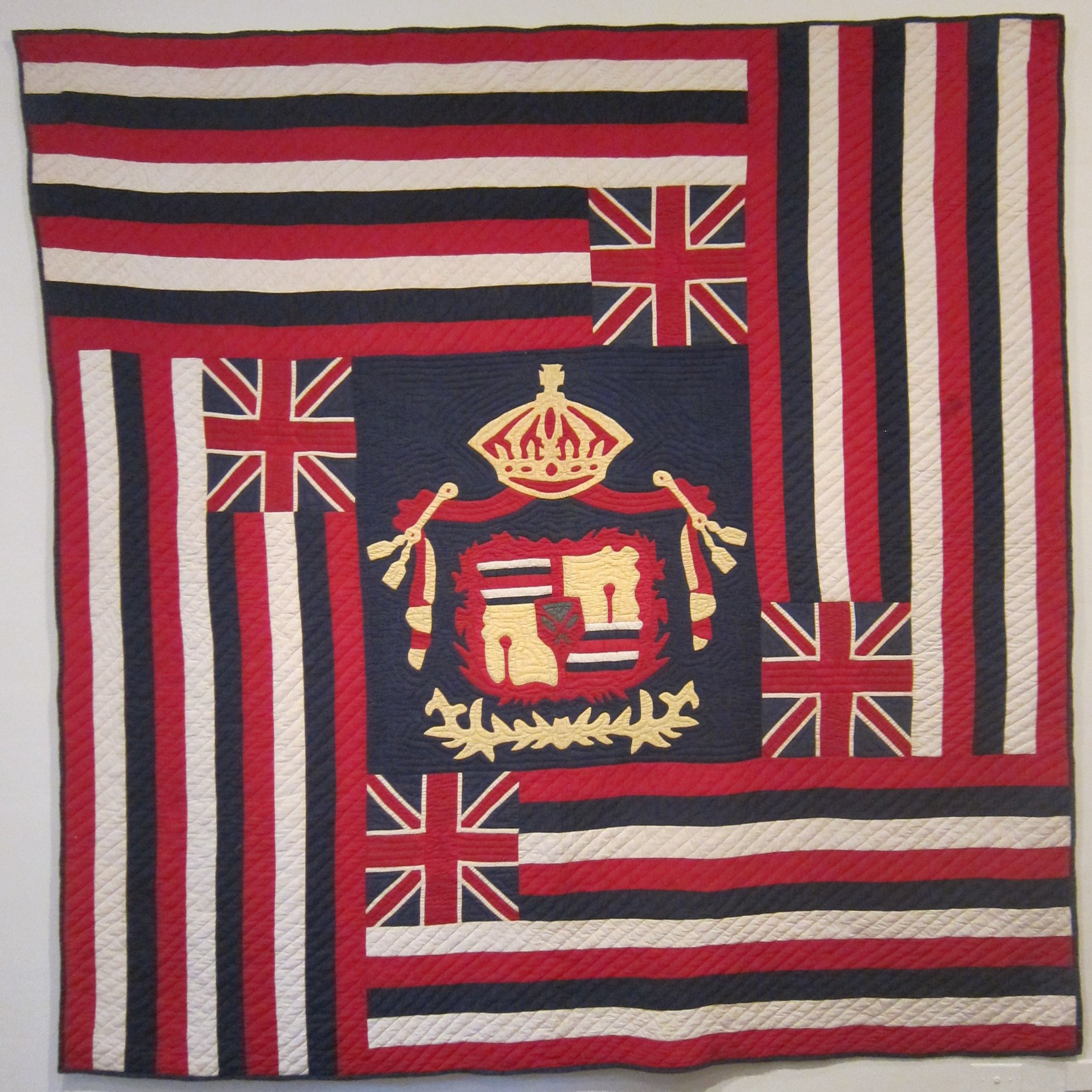
Kuʻu Hae Aloha (My Beloved Flag), Hawaiian cotton quilt from Waimea, before 1918, Honolulu Museum of Art.

The Hawaiian archipelago consists of 137 islands in the Pacific Ocean that are far from any other land. Polynesians arrived there one to two thousand years ago, and in 1778 Captain James Cook and his crew became the first Europeans to visit Hawaii (which they called the Sandwich Islands). The art created in these islands may be divided into art existing prior to Cook’s arrival; art produced by recently arrived westerners; and art produced by Hawaiians incorporating western materials and ideas. Public collections of Hawaiian art may be found at the Honolulu Museum of Art, the Bishop Museum (Honolulu), the Hawaii State Art Museum and the University of Göttingen in Germany.

In 1967, Hawaii became the first state in the nation to implement a Percent for Art law. The Art in State Buildings Law established the Art in Public Places Program and designated one percent of the construction costs of new public schools and state buildings for the acquisition of works of art, either by commission or by purchase.

== Art prior to Cook's arrival ==
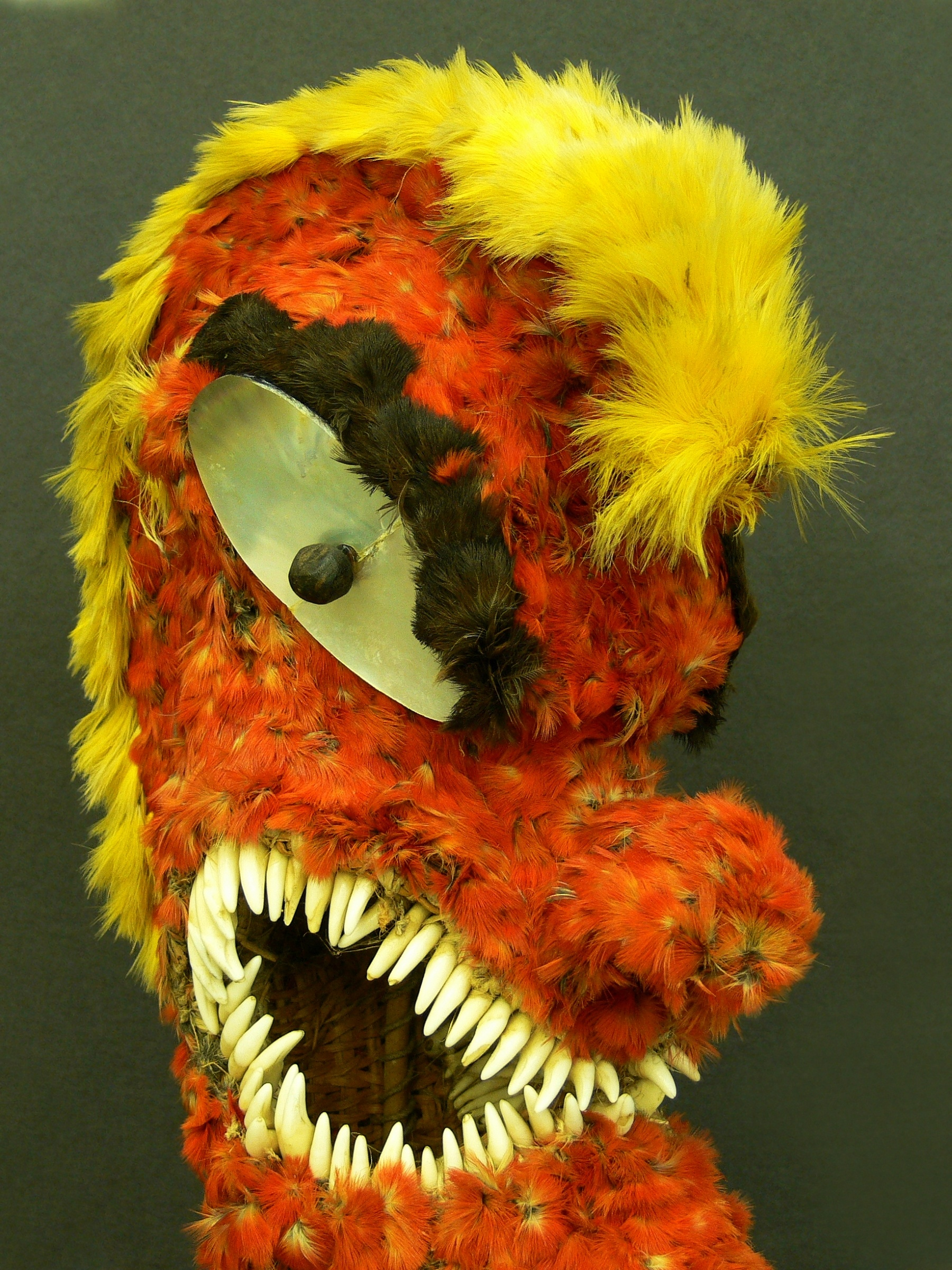
Kii-Hulu Manu (Hawaiian feathered image), 18th century, believed to represent Kuka’ilimoku, wicker, feathers, mother-of-pearl, dog teeth, Cook-Forster Collection of the University of Göttingen, Germany

Art existing prior to Cook’s arrival (in 1778) is very similar to the art of other Pacific Islanders. This early art practice includes wood carvings such as kiʻi (religious images), petroglyphs, kākau (Hawaiian tattooing), kapa (barkcloth; called kapa in Hawaiian, and tapa elsewhere in the Pacific), kapa kilohana (decorated barkcloth), ipu pā wehe (decorated gourds), kāhili (featherwork), lauhala weaving (weaving, plait, or braiding leaves), and leiomano (shark-tooth weapon). Native Hawaiians had neither metal, nor woven cloth. Production of this art continued after Cook’s arrival. A few craftsmen still produce traditional Hawaiian arts, either to sell to tourists or to preserve native culture.

=== List of native Hawaiian artists in the traditional arts ===
- Bernice Akamine (1949–2024) Honolulu-born artist of traditional Hawaiian arts including waiho‘olu‘u (natural plant dyes), kapa artist, and activist
- Puanani Van Dorpe (1933–2014) Honolulu-born kapa artist of mixed ethnicity
- Roen Hufford (born 1950) Molokaʻi-born kapa artist
- Mary Louise Kekuewa (1926–2008) Maui-born lei hulu (feather lei), haku hulu (featherwork) maker, teacher
- Dalani Tanahy (born 1961) San Diego-born Native Hawaiian kapa artist

== Art produced by visitors ==
Hawaii visitor Joseph Henry Sharp's oil painting 'Blow Hole, Honolulu'

Some of the first westerners to visit Hawaii were artists—both professional and amateur. Many of the explorers’ ships had professional artists to record their discoveries. These artists sketched and painted Hawaii’s people and landscapes using imported materials and concepts. Night scenes of erupting volcanoes were especially popular, giving rise to The Volcano School.

=== List of artists that visited Hawaii ===
Artists in this category include:

- Alfred Thomas Agate (1812–1849) New York painter and botanical illustrator,
- Auguste Borget (1809–1877) French painter,
- George Henry Burgess (1831–1905) English painter,
- Jean Charlot (1898–1979) French painter, illustrator,
- Nicholas Chevalier (1828–1902) Russian/Swiss painter,
- Louis Choris (1795–1828) German-Russian painter and explorer,
- Ernest William Christmas ( 1863–1918) Australian painter,
- Amelia R. Coats (1872–1949), Minnesota printmaker,
- Constance Fredericka Gordon Cumming (1837–1924) Scottish painter, poet,
- Robert Dampier (1800–1874) English painter,
- Stanislas Darondeau (1807–1841) French painter,
- John La Farge (1835–1910) New York painter,
- Ejler Andreas Jorgensen (1838–1876) Danish painter,
- Georgia O'Keeffe (1887–1986) Wisconsin modernist painter,
- Roi Partridge (1888–1984) Washington-state printmaker and teacher,
- Ambrose McCarthy Patterson (1877–1967) Australian painter,
- Enoch Wood Perry Jr. (1831–1915) Boston painter,
- James G. Sawkins (1806–1878) English artist, geologist, copper miner, and illustrator,
- Eduardo Lefebvre Scovell (1864–1918) English painter,
- Joseph Henry Sharp (American 1859–1953) Ohio painter,
- John Mix Stanley (1814–1872) New York painter,
- Joseph Dwight Strong (1852–1899) Connecticut painter, illustrator,
- Augustus Vincent Tack (1870–1949) Pennsylvanian painter,
- Adrien Taunay the Younger (1803–1828) French painter,
- Jules Tavernier (1844–1889) French painter,
- William Pinkney Toler (1826–1899) Colombian painter,
- Hubert Vos (1855–1935) Dutch painter,
- Lionel Walden (1861–1933) Connecticut painter,
- John Webber (1752–1793) Swiss-English painter, explorer,
- Theodore Wores (1859–1939) San Francisco painter

== Art produced by Hawaiians and long-term residents ==
Artworks produced by Hawaii’s native born and long-term residents incorporating western materials and ideas include paintings on canvas and quilts. They may be distinctly Hawaiian in subject matter or as diverse as their places of origin. Most of the art currently produced in Hawaii falls into this third category.

=== List of Hawaiian artists, and artists that lived in Hawaii long-term ===
Notable artists in this category include:

- Satoru Abe (born Hawaii 1926–2025) sculptor, painter,
- Fritz Abplanalp (born Switzerland 1907–1982) woodcarver,
- Bumpei Akaji (born Hawaii 1921–2002) sculptor,
- Mabel Alvarez (American 1891–1985) painter,
- Charles W. Bartlett (born England 1860–1940) painter and printmaker,
- Henry Bianchini (born San Diego 1935–) sculptor, painter and printmaker,
- Marguerite Blasingame (born Hawaii 1906–1947) painter and sculptor,
- Edward M. Brownlee (born Oregon 1929–2013) sculptor,
- Isami Doi (born Hawaii 1903–1965) painter,
- Paul Emmert (born Switzerland 1826–1867) drawer and painter,
- Robert Lee Eskridge (born Pennsylvania 1891–1975) genre painter, muralist and illustrator,
- Sally Fletcher-Murchison (born California 1933–) ceramicist,
- Cornelia MacIntyre Foley (born Hawaii 1909–) painter,
- Juliette May Fraser (born Hawaii 1887–1983) painter, muralist and printmaker,
- Charles Furneaux (born Boston 1835–1913) painter and educator,
- Hon Chew Hee (born Hawaii 1906–1993) painter,
- D. Howard Hitchcock (born Hawaii 1861–1943) painter,
- Ogura Yonesuke Itoh (born Japan 1870–1940) painter,
- Princess Kaʻiulani (born Hawaii 1875–1899) painter,
- Herb Kawainui Kāne (born Minnesota 1928–2011) Hawaiian historian and artist,
- John Melville Kelly (born California 1877–1962) painter,
- Kate Kelly (1882–1964) sculptor,
- Keichi Kimura (born Hawaii 1914–1988) painter,
- Sueko Matsueda Kimura (born Hawaii 1912–2001) painter,
- John Ingvard Kjargaard (born Denmark 1902–1992) painter,
- Alan Leitner (born California 1947–) abstract painter,
- Huc-Mazelet Luquiens (born Massachusetts 1881–1961) painter,
- Genevieve Springston Lynch (born Oregon 1891–1960) painter,
- Alexander Samuel MacLeod (born Canada 1888–1956) painter,
- Arman Tatéos Manookian (born Constantinople 1904–1931) Armenian-American painter,
- Joseph Nāwahī (born Hawaii 1842–1896) painter,
- Ben Norris (born California 1910–2006) painter,
- Brook Kapūkuniahi Parker (born Hawaii 1961– ),
- Louis Pohl (born Cincinnati 1915–1999) painter,
- Shirley Russell (born Los Angeles 1886–1985) painter,
- Mamoru Sato (born Texas 1937–) sculptor,
- Tadashi Sato (born Hawaii 1954–2005),
- Lloyd Sexton, Jr. (born Hawaii 1912–1990),
- Alice Louise Judd Simpich (born Hawaii 1918–2006) sculptor,
- Toshiko Takaezu (born Hawaii 1922–2011) ceramicist,
- Reuben Tam (born Hawaii 1916–1991) landscape painter, educator, poet and graphic artist,
- Masami Teraoka (born Japan 1936–) painter, printmaker,
- John Paul Thomas (born Alabama 1927–2001) painter,
- Madge Tennent (born England 1889–1972) painter,
- William Twigg-Smith (born New Zealand 1883–1950) painter,
- John Chin Young (born Hawaii 1909–1997) painter

== Selected works of native Hawaiian art ==
19th-century native Hawaiian feather cape (ʻahuʻula), University of Cambridge Museum of Archaeology and Anthropology

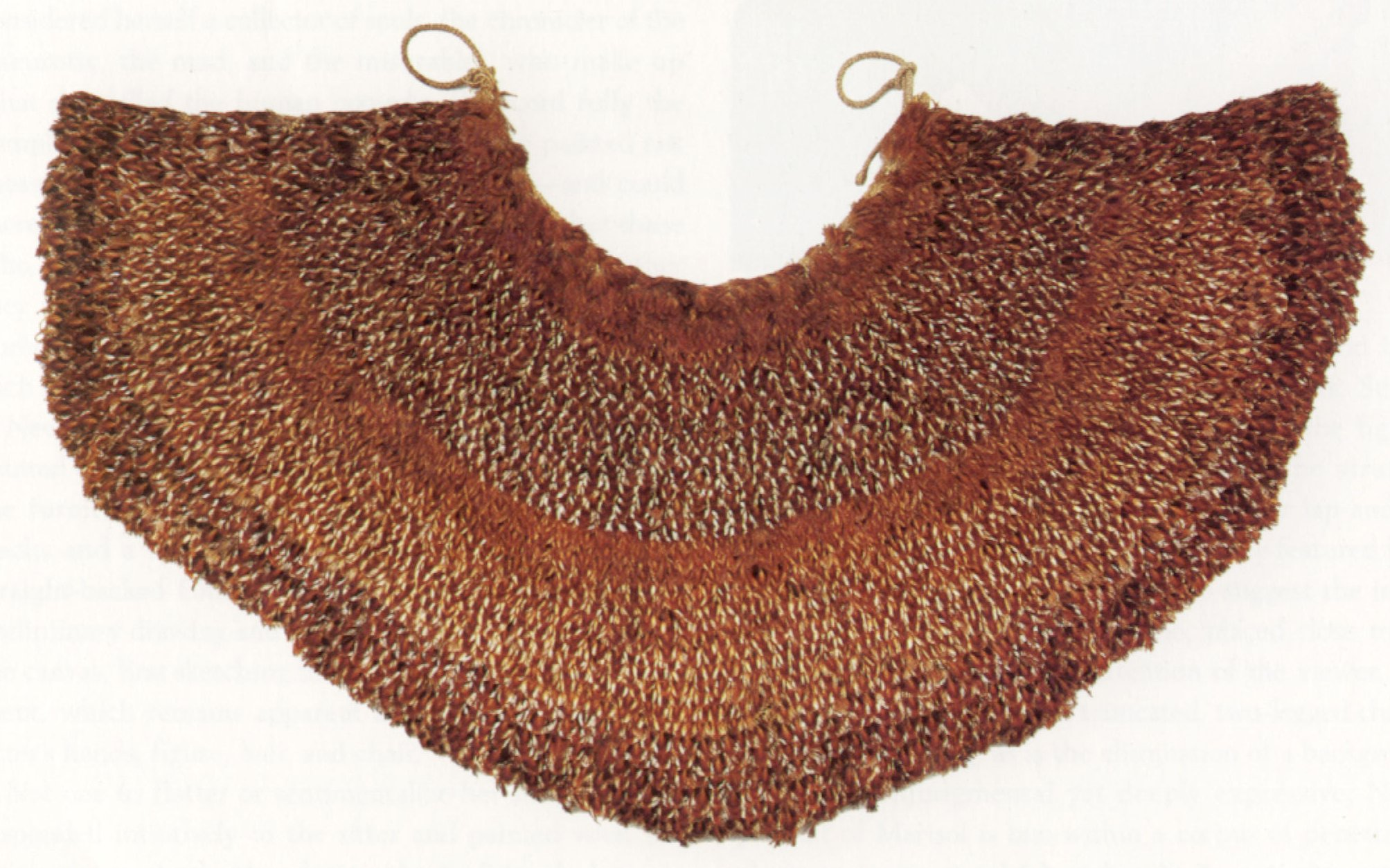
Hawaiian Cape, 18th century; pueo feathers tied on netting, Honolulu Museum of Art

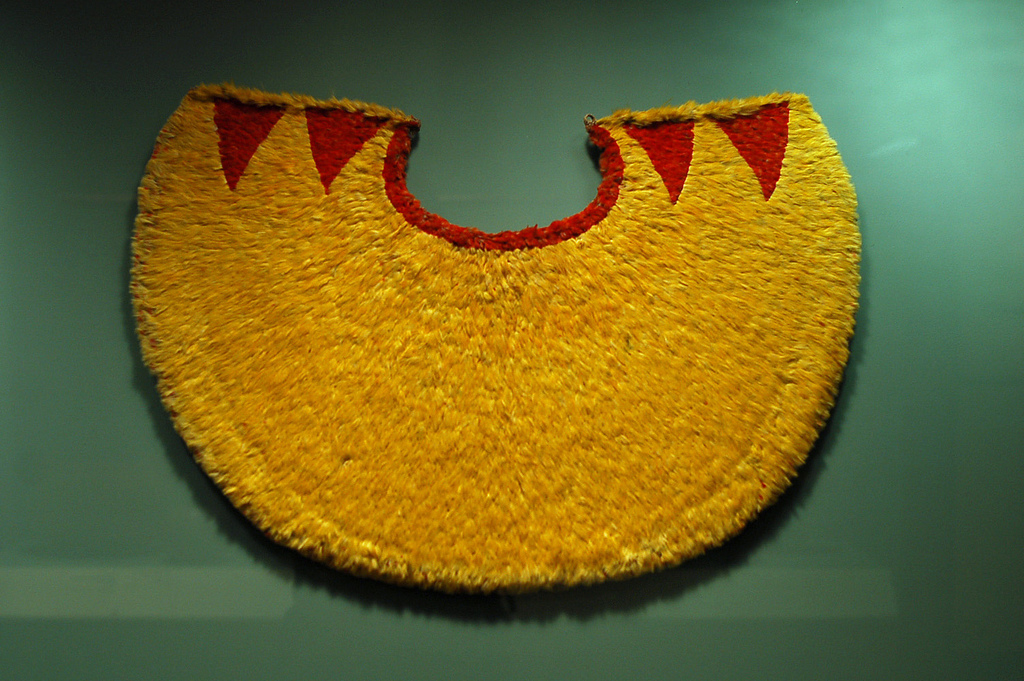
Ahuliʻi (feather cape), Hawaiian Islands, late 18th–early 19th century, ʻiʻiwi and ʻōʻō, olonā fiber netting, Honolulu Museum of Art

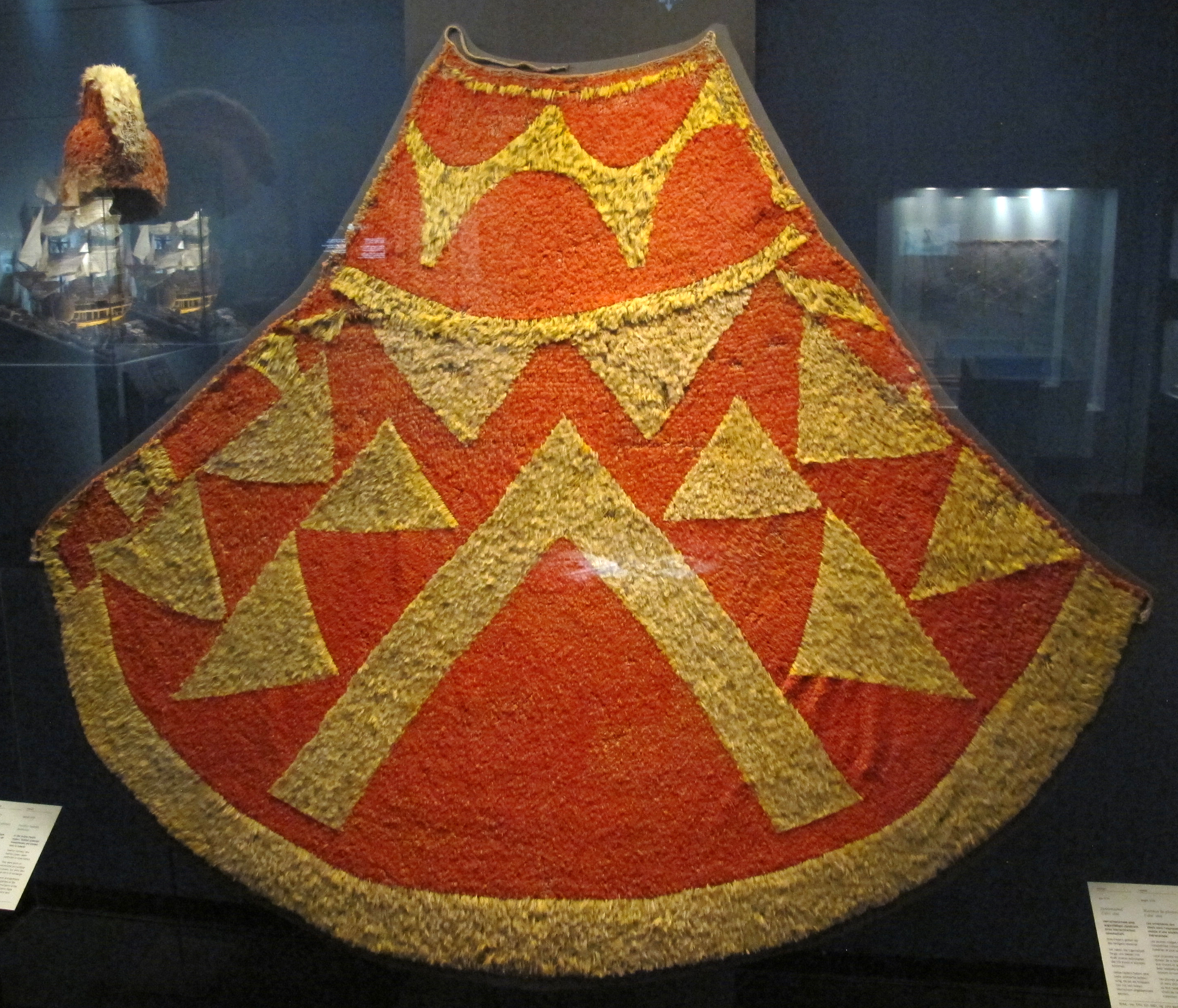
Ahu Ula cape with feathers, before 1779, Historisches Museum Bern

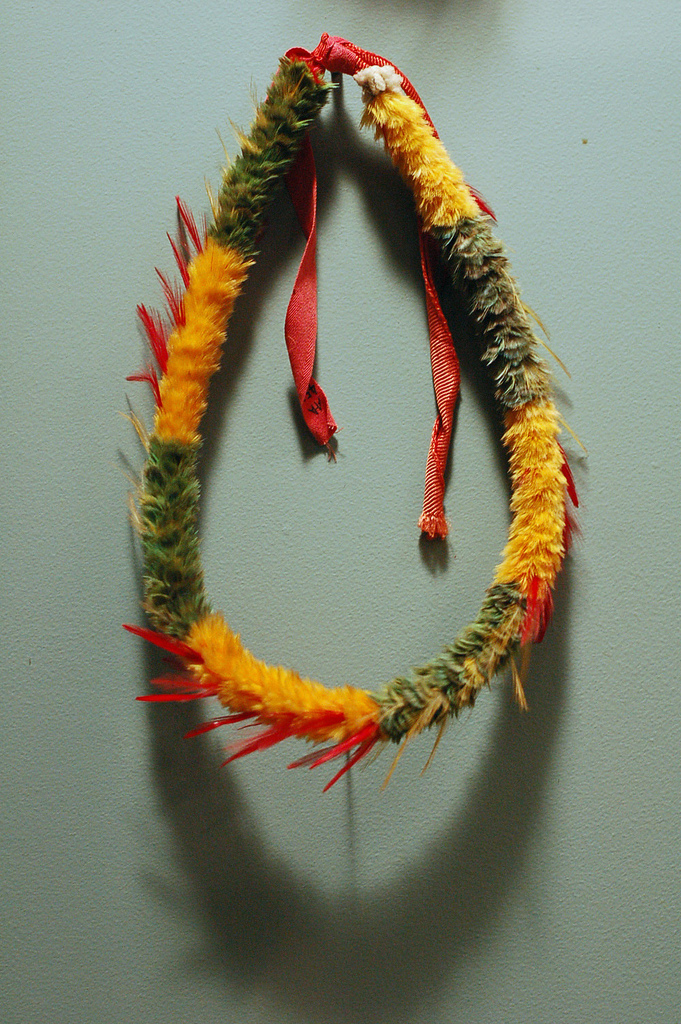
Lei Hulu (feather lei), Hawaiian Islands, 19th century, ʻiʻiwi, ʻōʻō, and ʻōʻū feathers, Honolulu Museum of Art

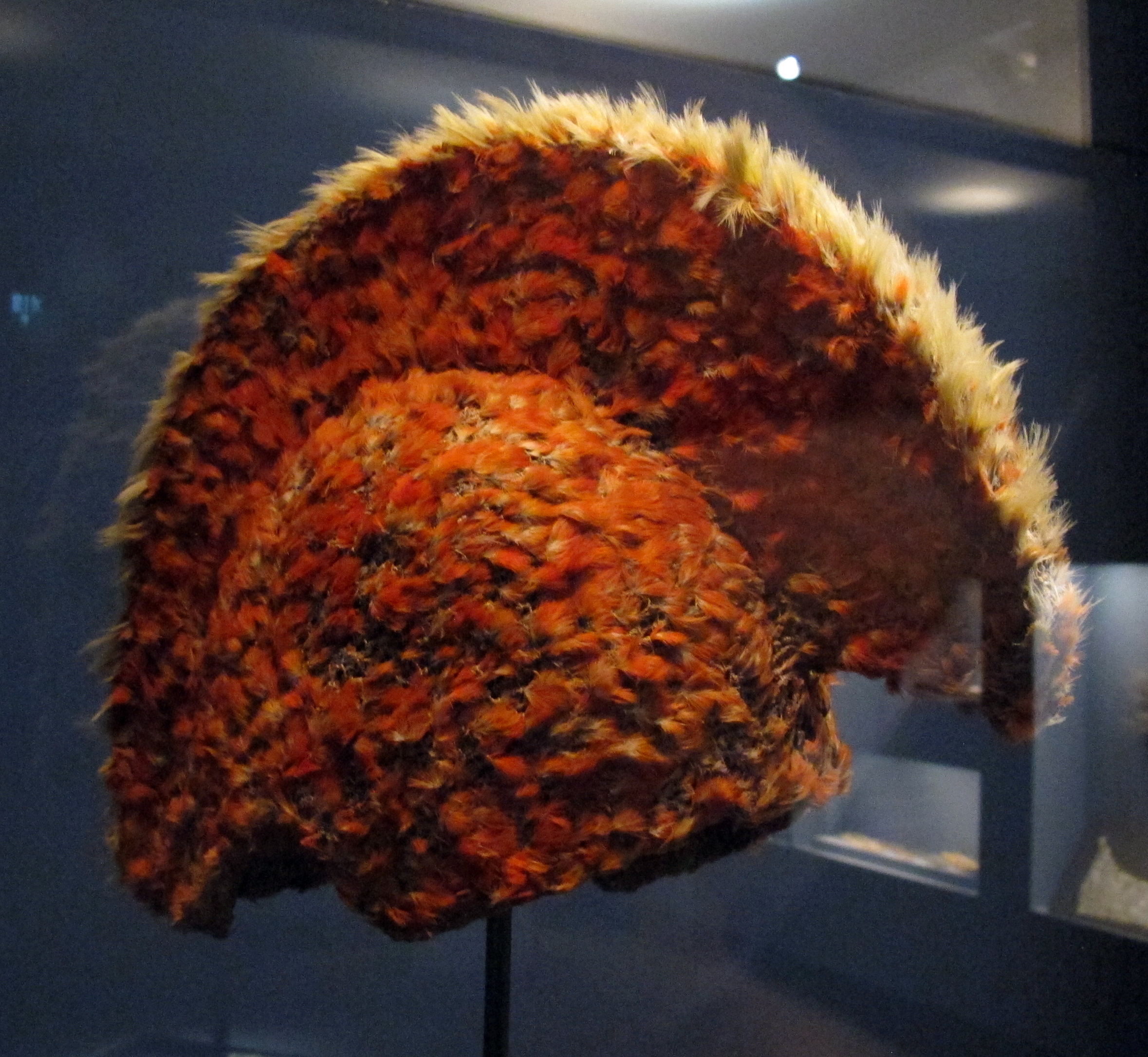
Hawaiian helm in feathers, before 1779, Historisches Museum Bern

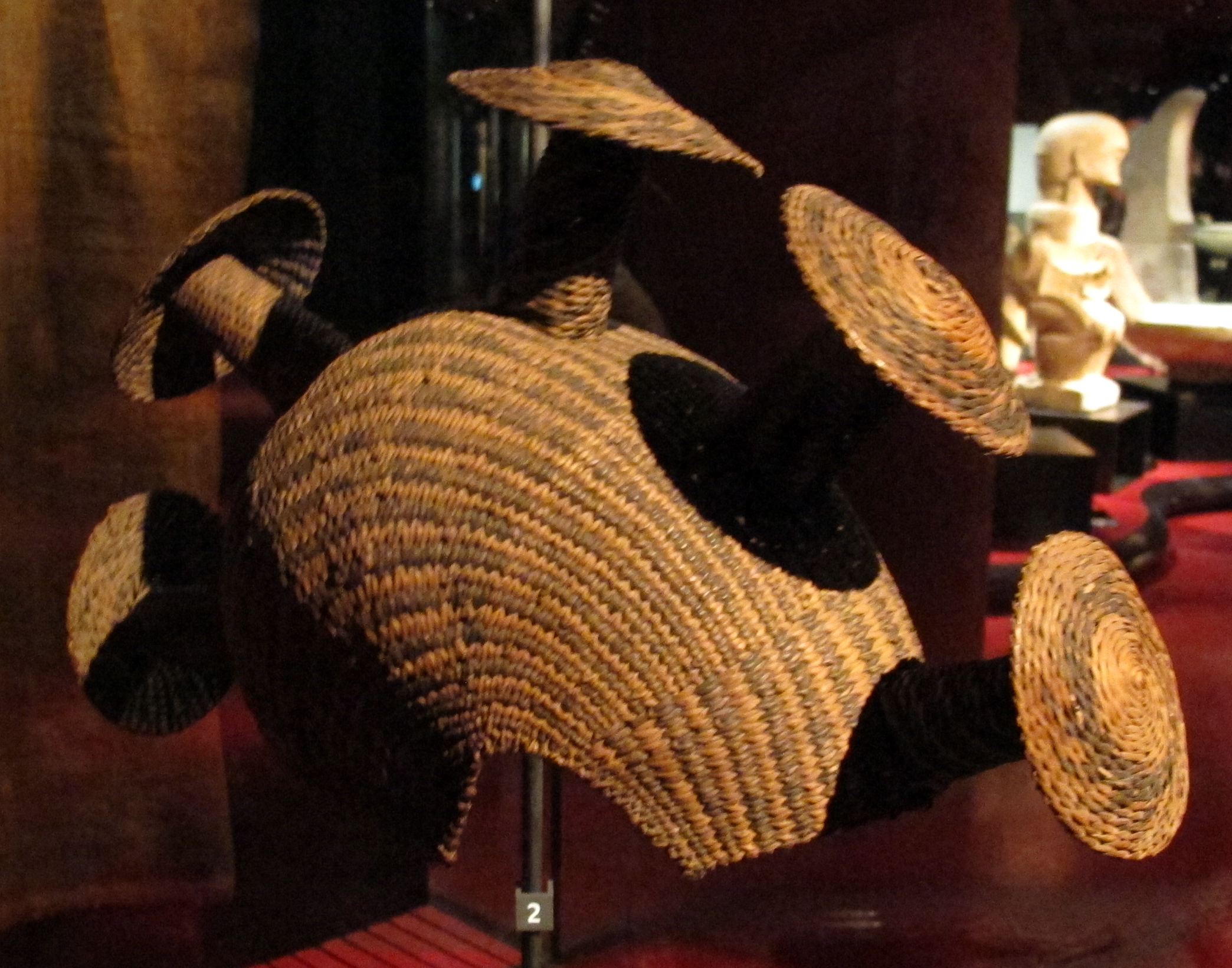
Mahiole helm, beginning of the 19th century, Musée du quai Branly, Paris

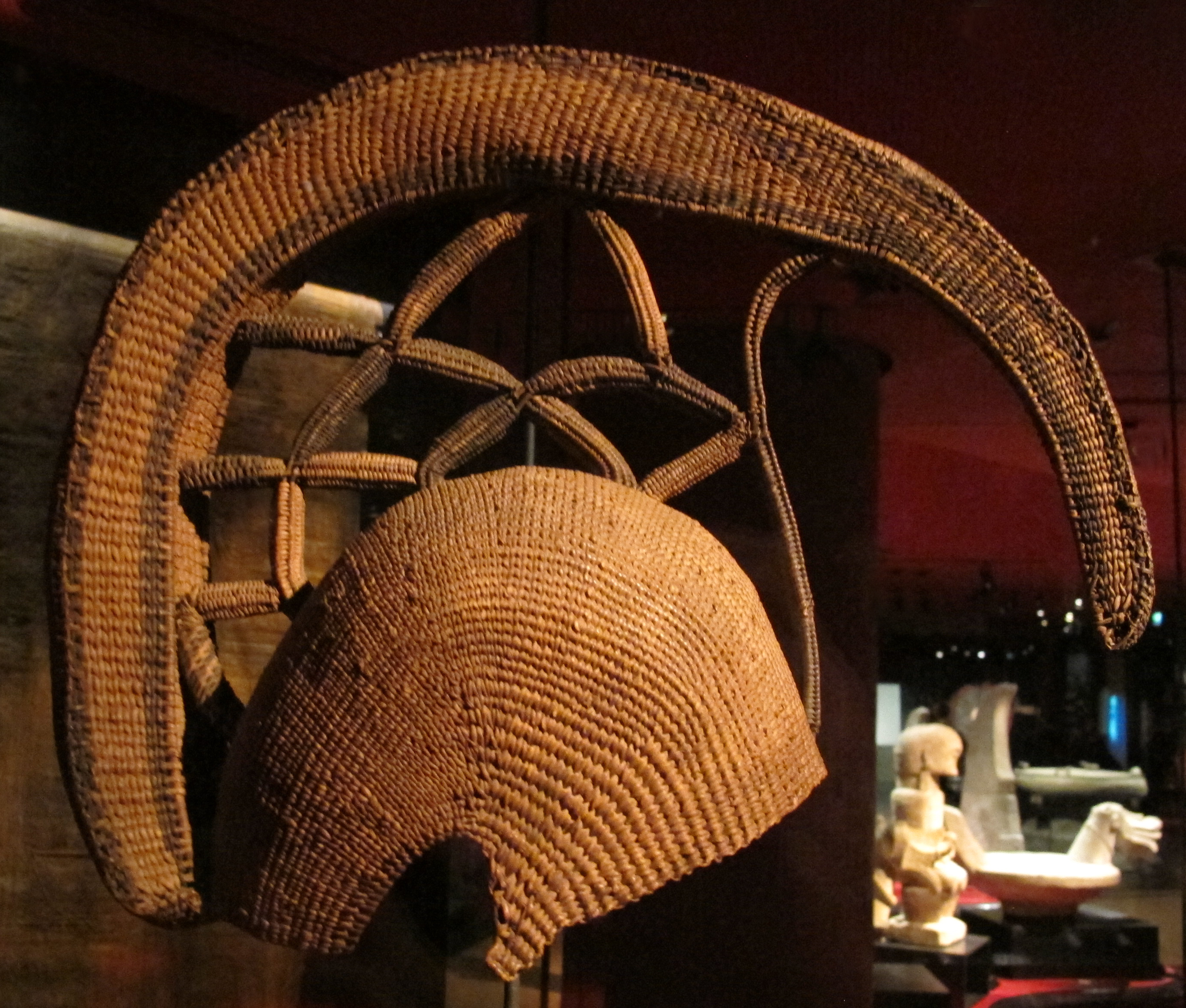
Mahiole helm, beginning of the 19th century, Musée du quai Branly, Paris

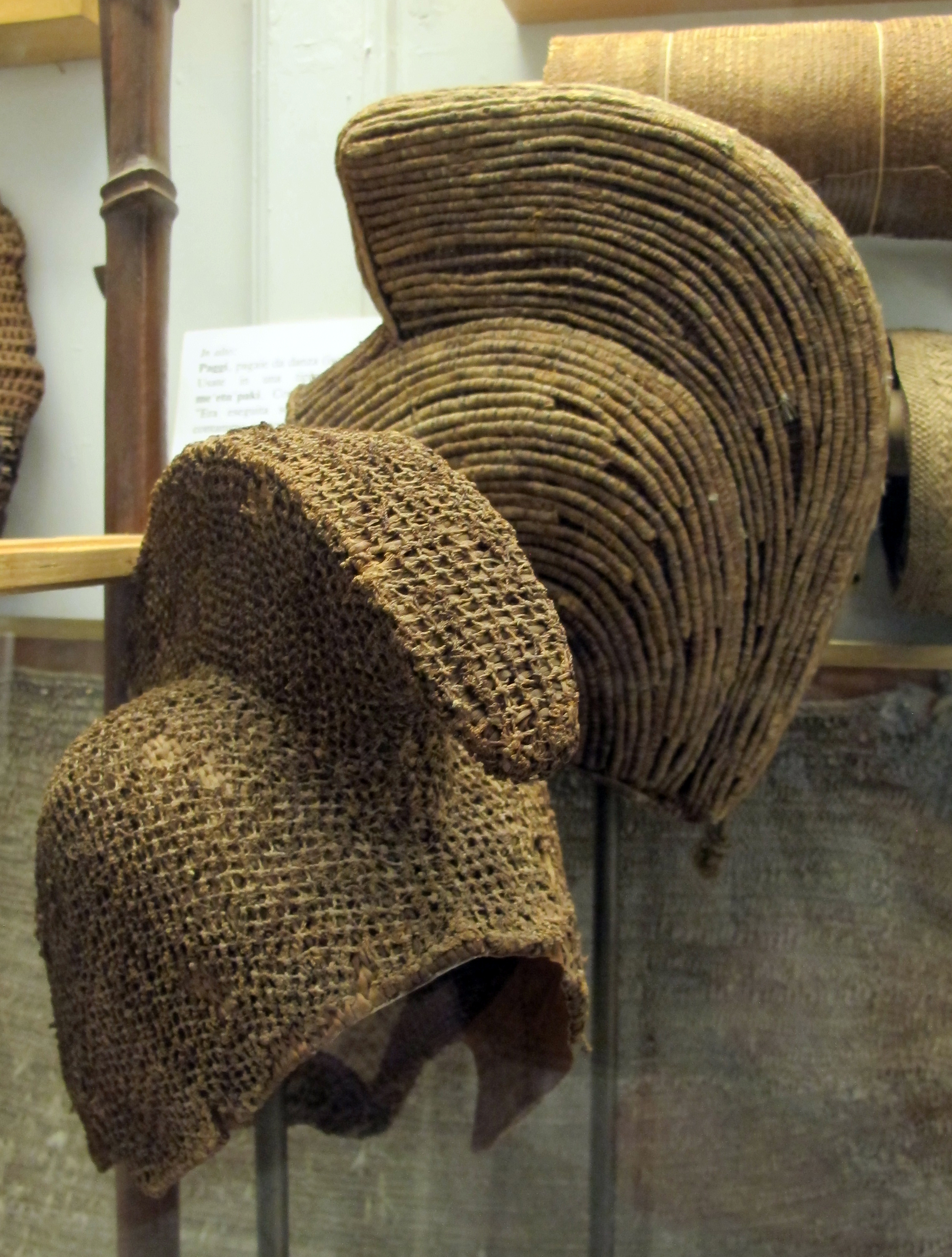
Two crested helms called "Hellenic style", Museo di Storia Naturale, Florence

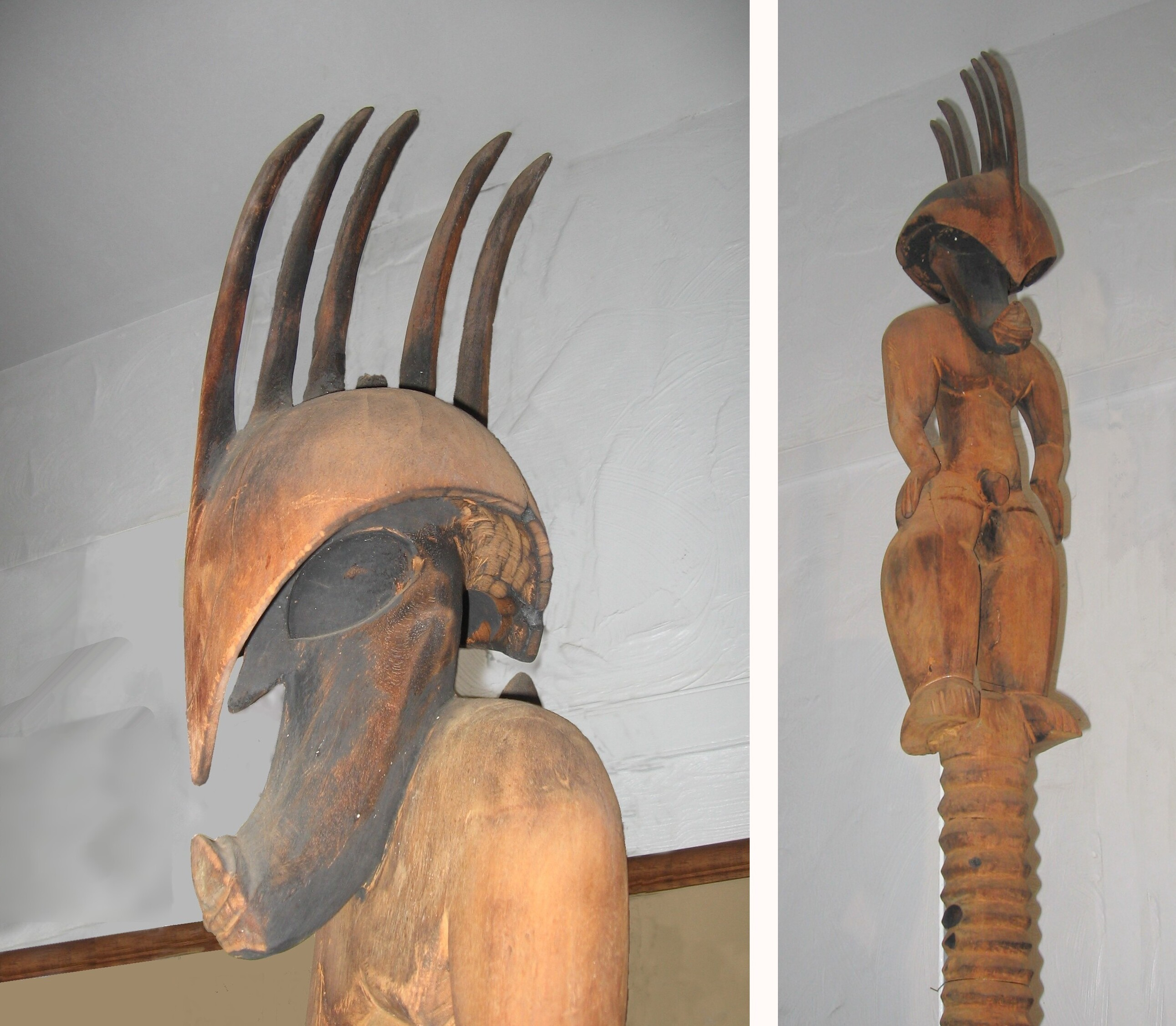
wooden statue of Kamapuaʻa from the Bailey House Museum

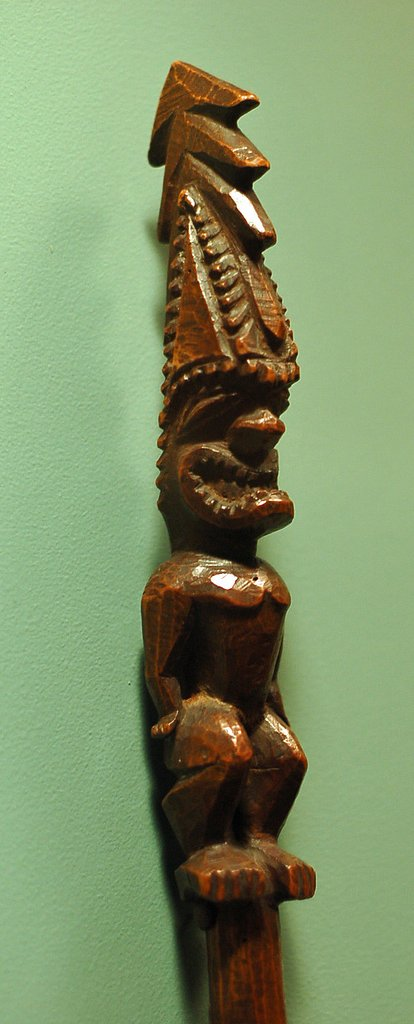
Akua Kaʻai (stick image), late 18th-early 19th century, Honolulu Museum of Art

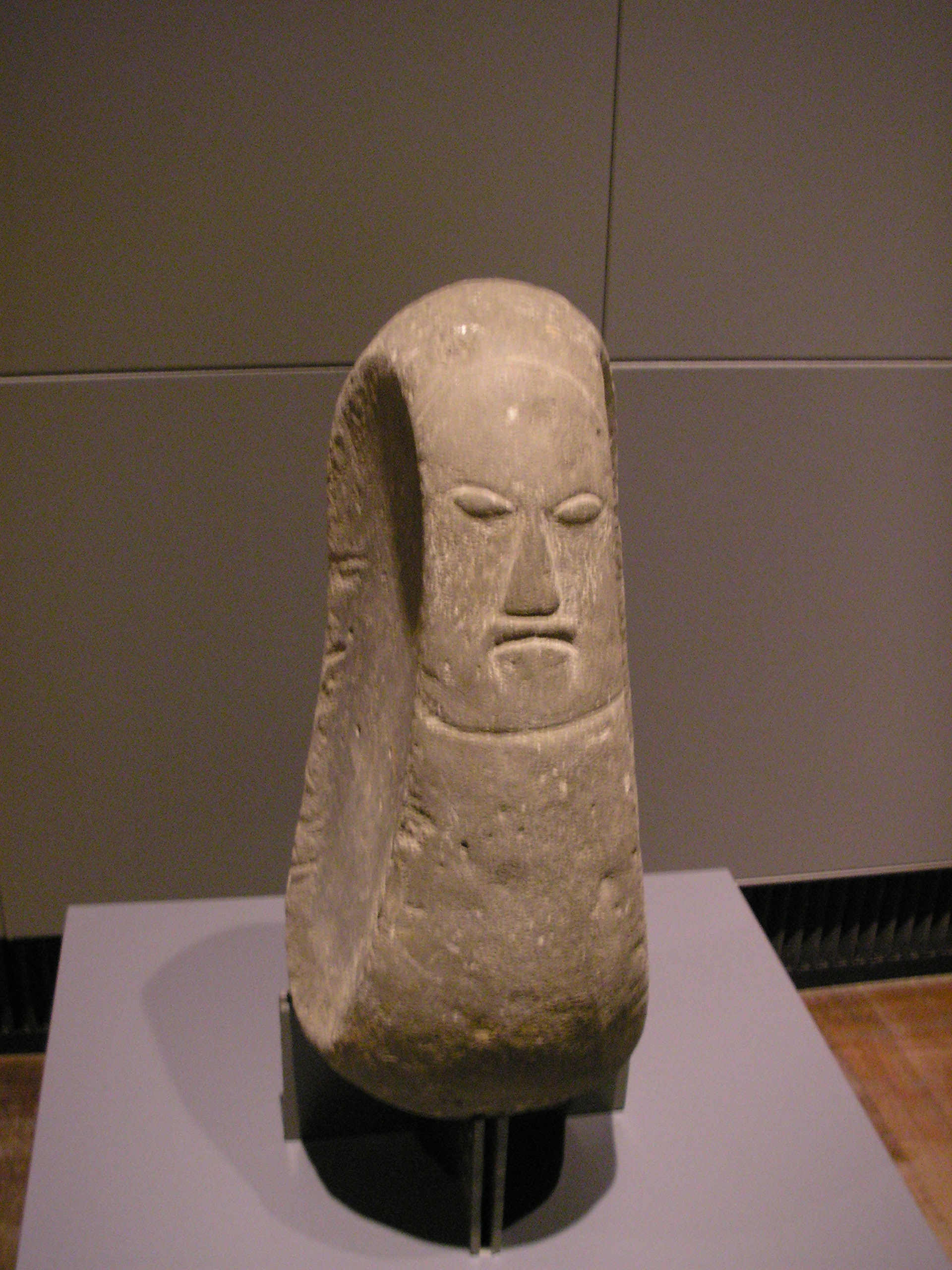
Probably the god of canoe carvers, Ethnological Museum of Berlin

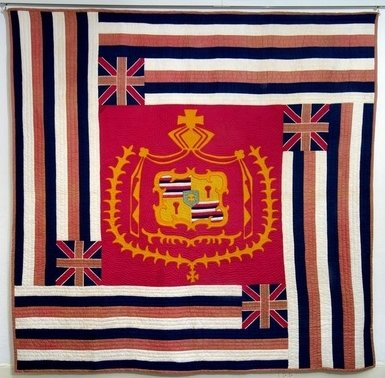
Kuʻu Hae Aloha (My Beloved Flag) Hawaiian cotton quilt from Maui, c. 1890s, Mission Houses Museum, Honolulu, Hawaii

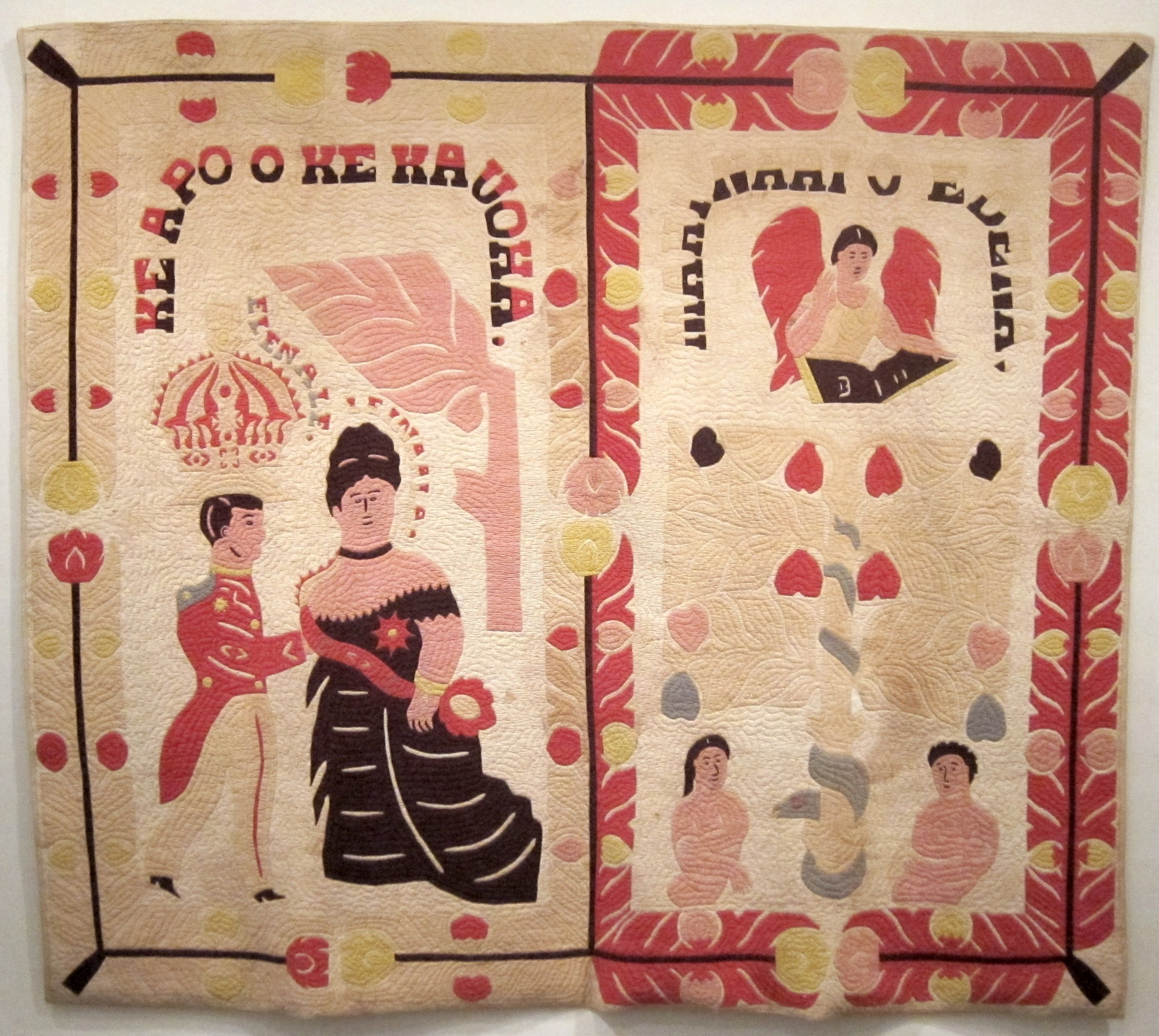
Na Kihapai Nani Lua ʻOle O Edena a Me Elenale (The Beautiful Unequaled Gardens of Eden and of Elenale), Hawaiian cotton quilt, before 1918, Honolulu Museum of Art

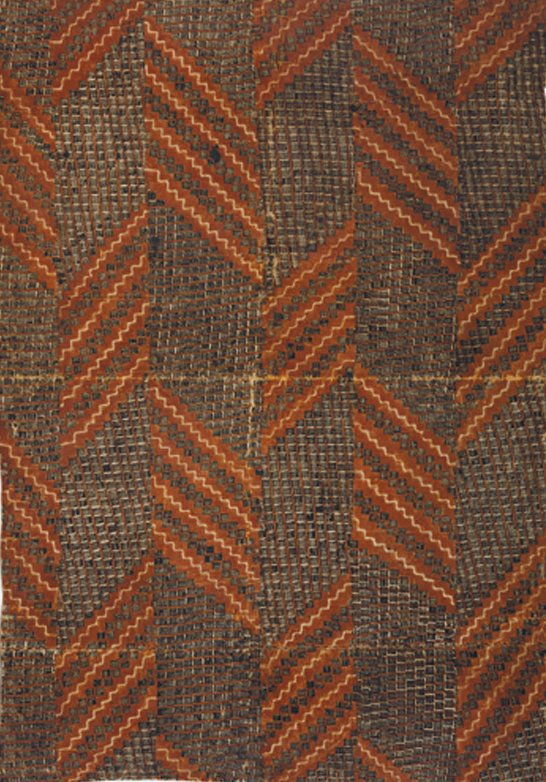
Hawaiian kapa, 18th century, Cook-Foster Collection at University of Göttingen, Germany

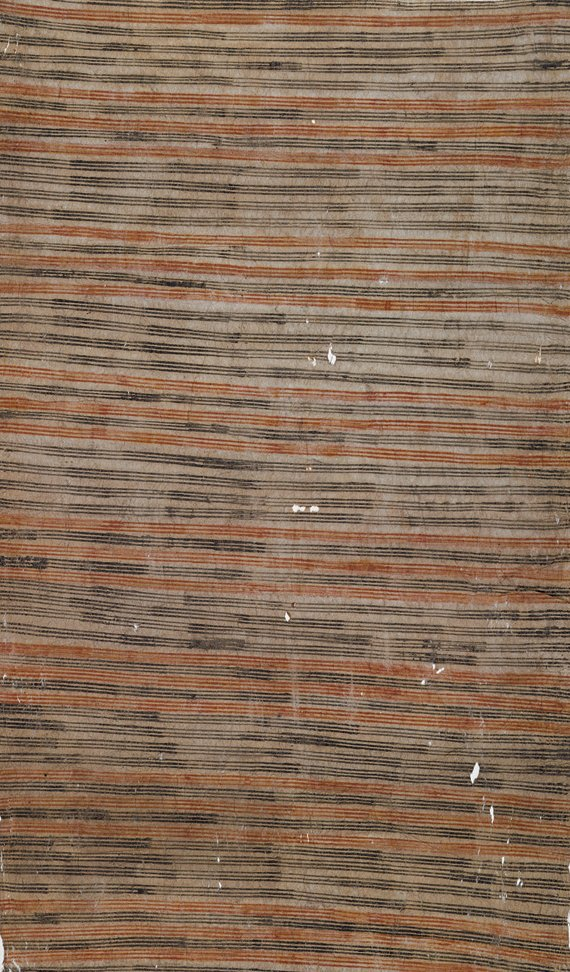
Hawaiian kapa, 18th century, Cook-Foster Collection at University of Göttingen, Germany

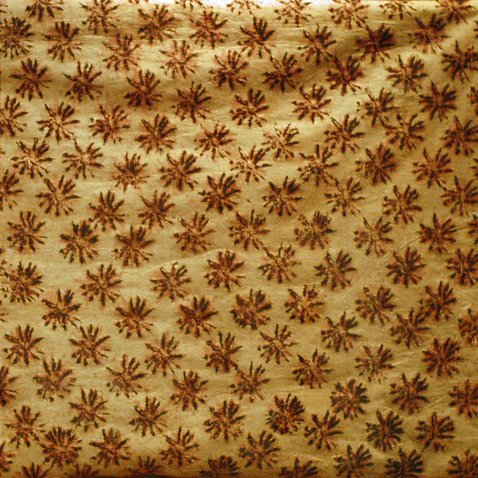
Kapa kilohana (bark cloth), Hawaii, 19th century, Honolulu Museum of Art

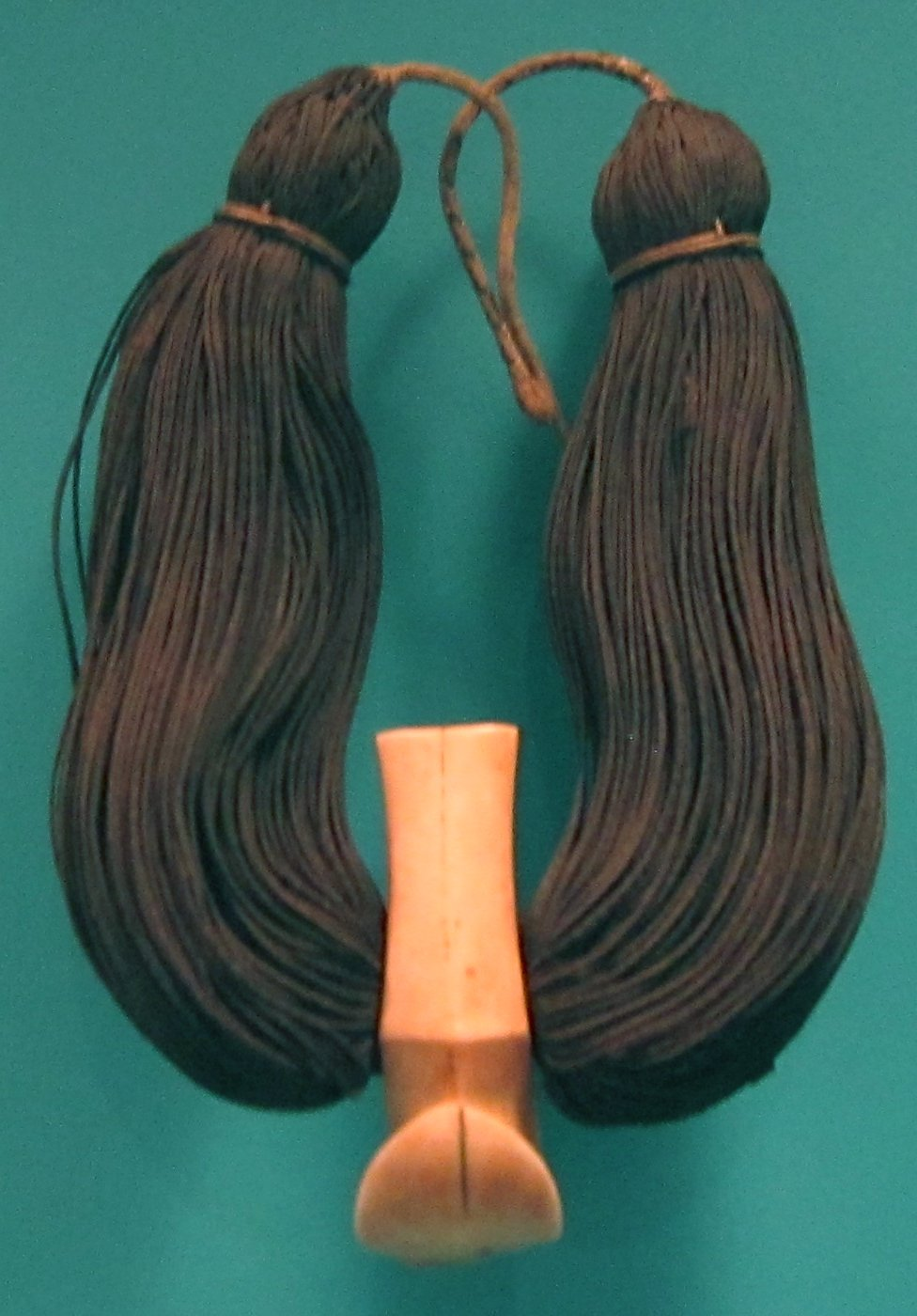
Lei niho palaoa (Hawaiian neck ornament), 19th century, carved sperm whale tooth, braided human hair, olonā cordage, Honolulu Museum of Art

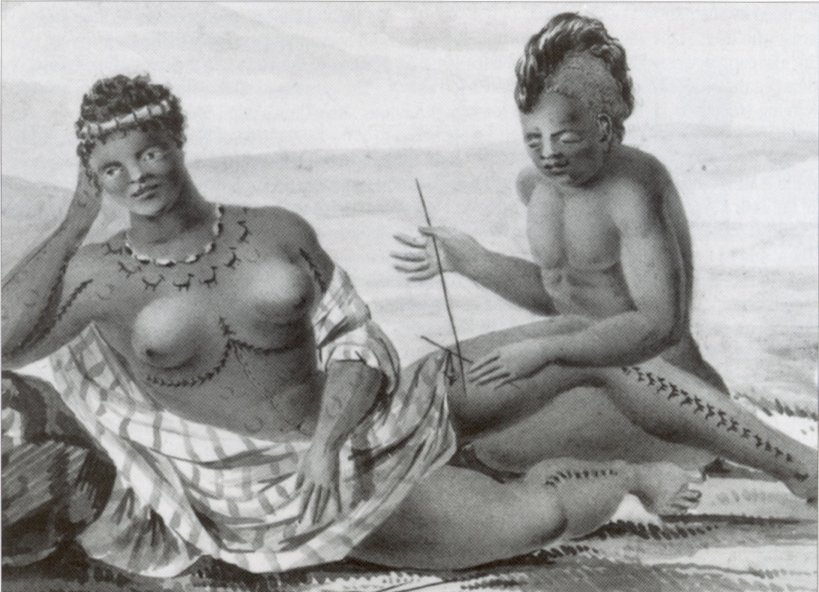
Tattooing, Sandwich Islands by Jacques Arago, Honolulu Museum of Art

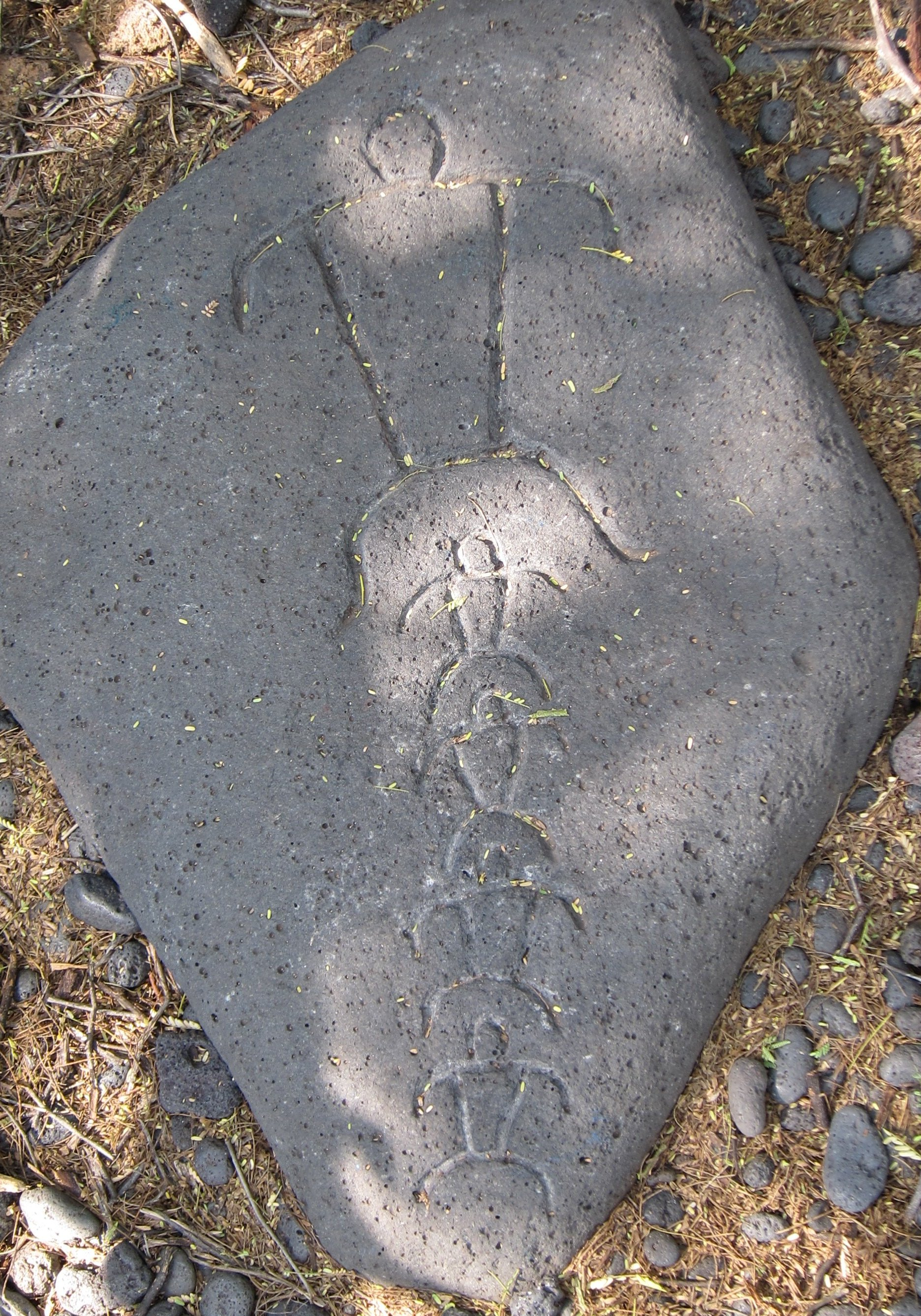
Petroglyph from the Puako Petroglyph Archaeological District

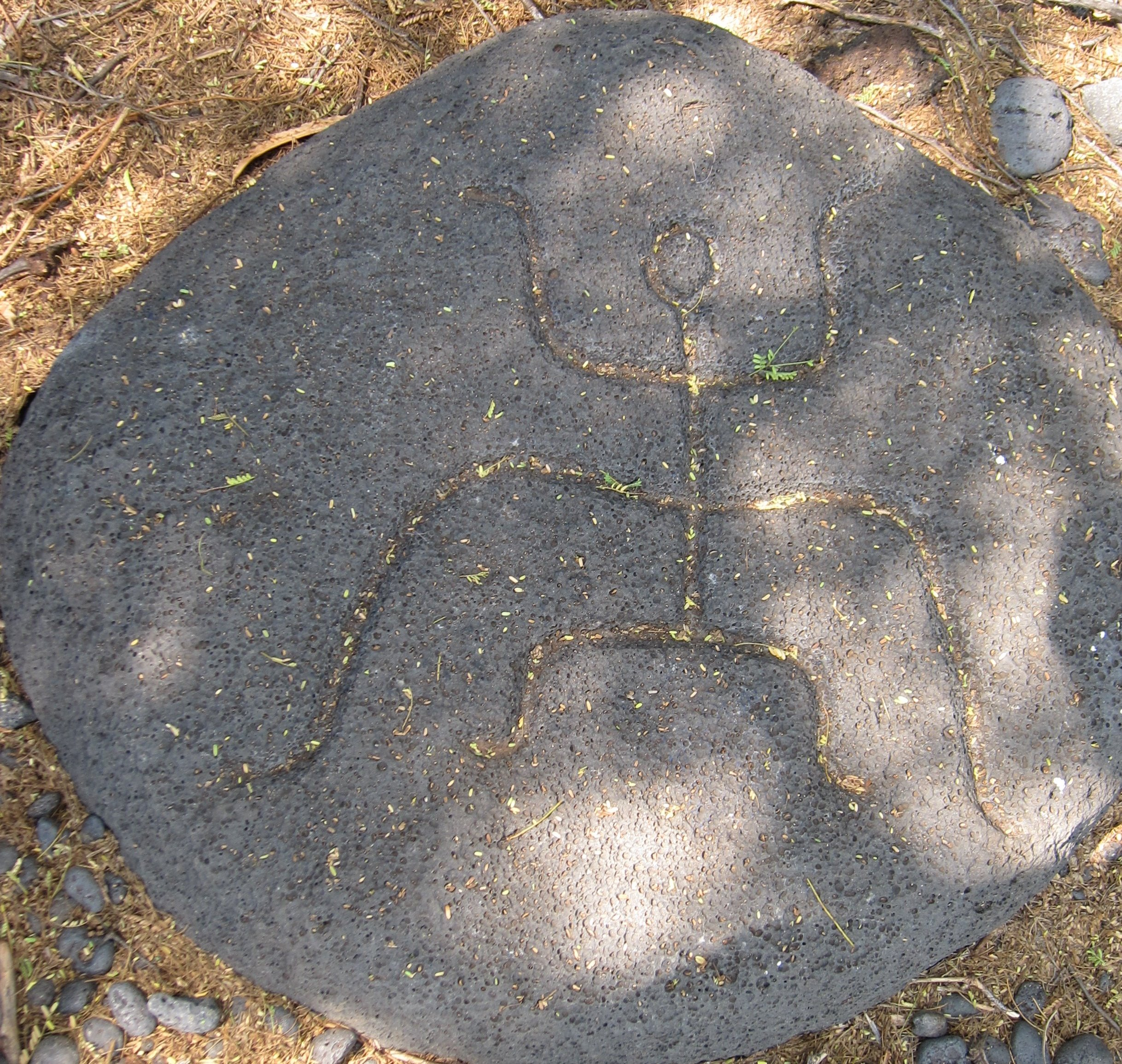
Petroglyph from the Puako Petroglyph Archaeological District
