= Charles Higa =

Pillow Form by Charles Higa, 2007, Honolulu Museum of Art

Charles Eisho Higa (1933–2012) was an artist and art educator, best known for his work in ceramics and watercolor.

He was born in Honolulu, to parents who had immigrated from Japan. Charles attended the University of Hawaii from 1951 to 1955, where his teachers included Kenneth Kingrey, Jean Charlot, Gustav Ecke, Ben Norris, Sueko Kimura, Claude Horan, Harue McVay, and Isami Enomoto. After graduating from the University of Hawaii with a BFA, he moved to New York, where he received an MFA in art education from New York University.

After serving in the Army, he returned to Hawaii, where he taught and practiced art. He taught at McKinley High School from 1965 until his retirement in 1987, and was selected by Look Magazine as Teacher of the Year in 1970. His work is in the permanent collection of the Hawaiʻi State Art Museum and the Honolulu Museum of Art.

He employs the Western materials and techniques that he was taught, but strives to give his creations an Asian feel, as in Pillow Form, a 2007 stoneware in the collection of the Honolulu Museum of Art. Charles Eisho Higa died on July 8, 2012, in Honolulu.
