= Keichi Kimura =

American painter (1914–1988)

- Born: 1914; Waiʻanae, Hawaiʻi
- Died: 1988 (aged 73–74)

Untitled painting by Keichi Kimura

Keichi Kimura (1914–1988) was a painter and illustrator who was born in Waiʻanae, Hawaiʻi in 1914. He received his first art instruction from teacher Shirley Russell while attending President William McKinley High School in Honolulu. In 1936, he earned a B.A. from the University of Hawaii at Manoa, where he studied under Henry H. Rempel and Huc-Mazelet Luquiens, and also met fellow art student and future wife, Sueko Matsueda. Keichi continued his education at Chouinard Art Institute (Los Angeles), Columbia University (New York City) and the Brooklyn Museum Art School (New York City). He first exhibited at the Honolulu Museum of Art at 19 years of age. During the Second World War, he served with the 100th Battalion of the 442nd Regimental Combat Team in Italy and France, where he produced many drawings that were also exhibited at the Honolulu Museum of Art. He was divorced from Sueko in 1962 and died in Honolulu in 1988.

Although he painted many portraits, he is best known for his semi-abstract landscapes, like the untitled painting at right. They are usually uninhabited and have symbolic meanings. The Hawaii State Art Museum, Honolulu Museum of Art and the Smithsonian American Art Museum (Washington, D. C.) are among the public collections holding works by Keichi Kimura.

== Footnotes ==
Notes

- Forbes, David W., "Encounters with Paradise: Views of Hawaii and its People, 1778-1941", Honolulu Academy of Arts, 1992, 214, 269.
- Hartwell, Patricia L. (editor), Retrospective 1967-1987, Hawaii State Foundation on Culture and the Arts, Honolulu, Hawaii, 1987, p. 56
- Morse, Marcia, Legacy: Facets of Island Modernism, Honolulu, Honolulu Academy of Arts, 2001, ISBN 978-0-937426-48-7, pp. 21, 46-51
- Morse, Marcia, "Inner World, Outer World: The Art of Keichi and Sueko Kimura", Honolulu Academy of Arts, 2001.
- Yoshihara, Lisa A., Collective Visions, 1967-1997, Hawaii State Foundation on Culture and the Arts, Honolulu, Hawaii, 1997, 51.
