= Matsueda =

Matsueda is a Japanese surname. The most common written form is 松枝, meaning "pine branch".

Matsueda may refer to the following people:

- Noriko Matsueda 松枝 賀子, composer
- Sueko Matsueda Kimura, artist
