= John Kjargaard =

Danish-American painter, printmaker and collage artist (1902-1992)

On the Road to Hana by John Ingvard Kjargaard, 1976, acrylic on canvas, Honolulu Museum of Art

John Ingvard Kjargaard (September 13, 1902 – July 31, 1992) was a Danish-American painter, printmaker and collage artist.

== Biography ==
Kjargaard was born at Herning, Denmark and moved to the United States at an early age. He studied art at Cooper Union in New York City and continued his studies at the University of California, Berkeley, and later with Josef Albers at the University of Hawaii. While still a student, he went to work during summer vacation in the art department of a San Francisco engraving firm, which led to his start as a color etcher.

In 1937, he came to Honolulu under a year's contract as a photo-engraver working for Paradise of the Pacific magazine. He became a permanent employee of the firm and remained in Hawaii. He exhibited annually at the Honolulu Academy of Arts from 1940. He was a teacher at University of Hawaii art department from 1968.

His acrylic on canvas painting, On the Road to Hana, from 1976, is in the collection of the Honolulu Museum of Art. It demonstrates his semi-abstract style, which emphasizes the interaction of colors and the equal importance of positive and negative space.

The Hawaii State Art Museum, the Honolulu Museum of Art, The Library of Congress (Washington, D.C.), and the Mint Museum of Art (Charlotte, North Carolina), and are among the public collections holding work by John Ingvard Kjargaard.

== Other sources ==
- Haar, Francis and Neogy, Prithwish, Artists of Hawaii: Nineteen Painters and Sculptors, University of Hawaii Press, 1974, pp. 82-87.
- Hartwell, Patricia L. (editor), Retrospective 1967-1987, Hawaii State Foundation on Culture and the Arts, Honolulu, Hawaii, 1987, p. 75
- Morse, Morse (ed.), Honolulu Printmakers, Honolulu, HI, Honolulu Academy of Arts, 2003, ISBN 0-937426-58-X, p. 36
- Warinner, Emily, Hawaii's Gift to the World. A short short story. Words by Emily Warinner. Drawings by John Kjargaard, 1950.
- Yoshihara, Lisa A., Collective Visions, 1967-1997, An Exhibition Celebrating the 30th Anniversary of the State Foundation on Culture and the Arts, Art in Public Places Program, Presented at the Honolulu Museum of Art, September 3-October 12, 1997, Honolulu, State Foundation on Culture and the Arts, 1997, p. 22.
