= No. 1 Capitol District Building =

Building in Honolulu, Hawaii, United States

Coordinates: 21°18′31″N 157°51′30″W

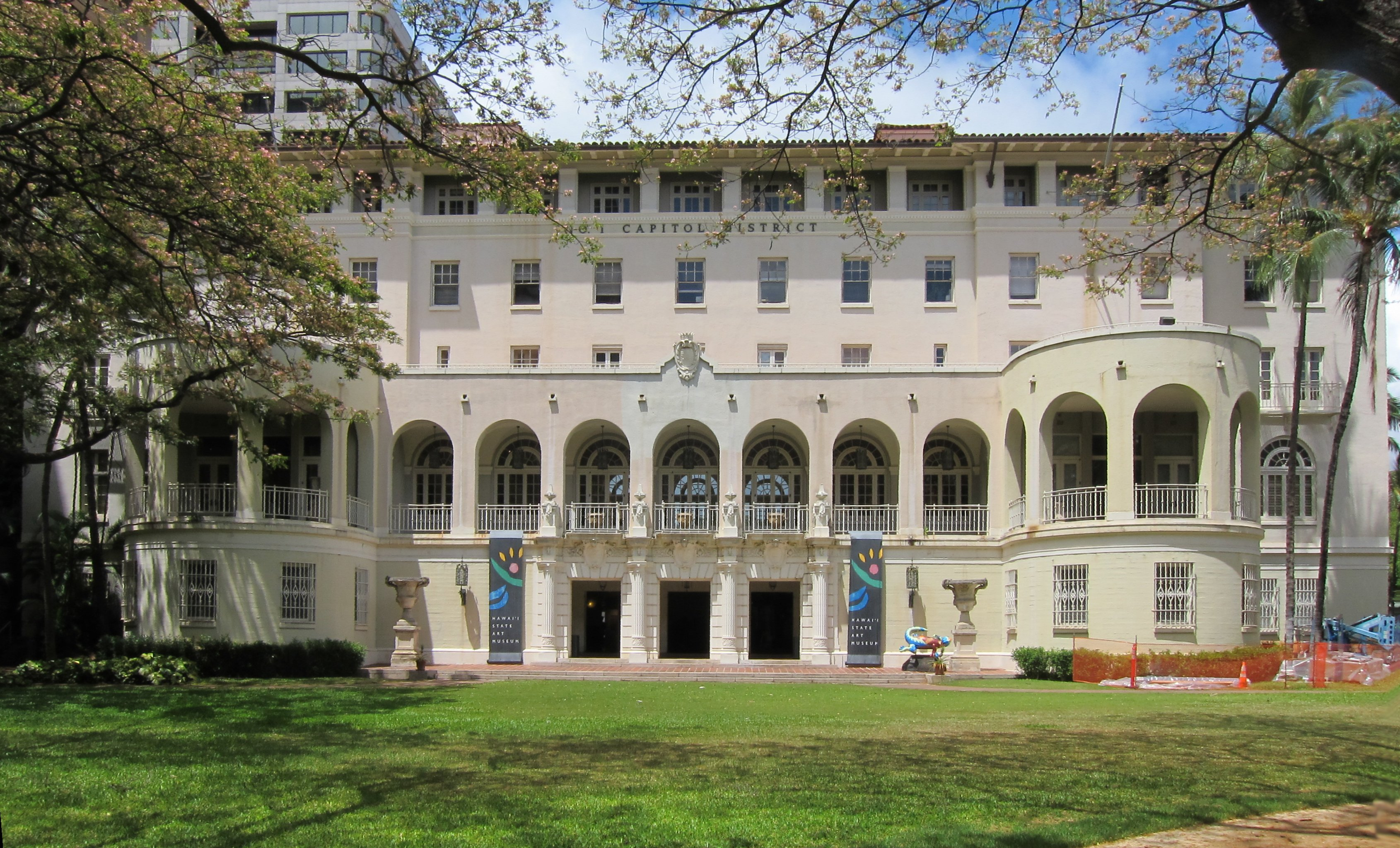
No. 1 Capitol District Building, also known as the Hemmeter Building

The No. 1 Capitol District Building, also known as the Hemmeter Building, is a 134,000-square-foot building (12,400 m^{2}) on two acres (0.81 ha) in downtown Honolulu, Hawaii, United States. Formerly known as the Armed Services YMCA Building, it houses the Capitol Modern Museum, the Hawaii State Foundation on Culture and the Arts, and state offices.

Located at 250 South Hotel Street, it is across Richards Street from the Hawaii State Capitol building. The area was added to the National Register of Historic Places listings in Oahu as the Hawaii Capital Historic District on December 1, 1978.

== History ==
While they were both in the cabinet, under King Kamehameha V, American politicians John Mott-Smith and Charles Coffin Harris convinced the legislature to fund a hotel. Hawaii’s first hotel, the Hawaiian Hotel, opened in 1872. Renamed the Royal Hawaiian Hotel, it was converted to a YMCA in 1917 and used by the military in World War I. In 1926 the termite-infested building was torn down, and a new one designed in Spanish mission style by Lincoln Rogers of the firm Emory & Webb. The two-story U-shaped building, dedicated on March 16, 1928, included a swimming pool in its courtyard.

In the late 1980’s, the building underwent a major renovation by the Hemmeter Corporation.

== Museum ==
The Capitol Modern Museum is operated by the Hawaii State Foundation on Culture and the Arts, and is located on the second floor of the No. 1 Capitol District Building.
