= Hon Chew Hee =

American painter (1906–1993)

- Born: 1906; Kahului, Maui, Territory of Hawaii (now Hawaii, U.S.)
- Died: 1993 (aged 86–87); Kaneohe, Oahu, Hawaii, U.S.
- Other name: Hon-Chew Hee
- Education: San Francisco Art Institute, Art Students League of New York, Columbia University
- Spouse: Marjorie Wong

Signature
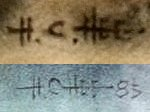

Hon Chew Hee (1906 – 1993) was a Hawaiian-born American muralist, watercolorist and printmaker.

== Early life and education ==
Sunrise Koolau, oil painting by Hon Chew Hee, 1971, Hawaii State Art Museum

Hon Chew Hee was born in 1906, in Kahului, Maui, Territory of Hawaii (now Hawaii, U.S.). His father Jackson Hee had moved from China to Hawaii at age 19 in 1885, when he joined Sun Yat-sen's Revolutionary Party. Hon Chew Hee grew up in China, where he received his early training in Chinese brush painting.

Hee returned to the United States in 1920 at age 14 in order to further his training at the San Francisco Art Institute. He also studied in New York City at the Art Students League of New York, at Columbia University, and spent three years in Paris in the 1950s studying with Fernand Léger and Andre Lhote. He was especially greatly influenced by the art of Jean Arp.

== Career ==
From 1932 to the beginning of World War II, Hee lived in San Francisco, where he founded the Chinese Art Association. After graduating from the San Francisco Art Institute then taught in China until moving to Hawaii in 1935. In Hawaii, he worked as a freelance artist and held classes in both Western and Eastern styles of painting. Together with Isami Doi (1903–1965), Hee taught painting classes at the YMCA. At this time, Doi instructed the young artist in woodcarving techniques and Hee, like his master, created wood engravings drawn from the rural life in the Islands. Hee also founded the Hawaii Watercolor and Serigraph Society.

For the remainder of his life, he lived in Kaneohe, on the Hawaiian island of Oahu. He died in 1993, at Castle Hospital.

Hee completed six murals for the Hawaii State Foundation on Culture and the Arts, the best known of which are The History of Medicine in Hilo Hospital and the murals that greet departing travelers at the Inter-island Terminal of Honolulu International Airport. His other murals were painted for Manoa Library, Enchanted Lake Elementary School, Pukalani Elementary School, and Mililani Library. He also produced entirely abstract works, such as Sunrise Koolau in the collection of the Hawaii State Art Museum. The Hawaii State Art Museum, the Hawaii State Capitol, the Honolulu Museum of Art, the National Taiwan Museum and the Nelson-Atkins Museum of Art (Kansas City, Missouri) and are among the public collections holding works by Hon Chew Hee.

== Footnotes ==
- Chang, Gordon H., Mark Dean Johnson, Paul J. Karlstrom & Sharon Spain, Asian American Art, a History, 1850-1970, Stanford University Press, ISBN 9780804757515, pp. 325–326
- Forbes, David W., "Encounters with Paradise: Views of Hawaii and its People, 1778-1941", Honolulu Academy of Arts, 1992, 263.
- Haar, Francis and Neogy, Prithwish, "Artists of Hawaii: Nineteen Painters and Sculptors", University of Hawaii Press, 1974, 66-73.
- Hartwell, Patricia L. (editor), Retrospective 1967-1987, Hawaii State Foundation on Culture and the Arts, Honolulu, Hawaii, 1987, p. 32
- Morse, Morse (ed.), Honolulu Printmakers, Honolulu, HI, Honolulu Academy of Arts, 2003, p. 28, ISBN 0-937426-58-X
- Radford, Georgia and Warren Radford, "Sculpture in the Sun, Hawaii's Art for Open Spaces", University of Hawaii Press, 1978, 93.
- Yoshihara, Lisa A., Collective Visions, 1967-1997, Hawaii State Foundation on Culture and the Arts, Hawaii, 1997, 142-143.
