= Marjorie Wong Hee =

American Hawaiian painter, teacher (1905–1981)

- Born: Marjorie Wong; August 31, 1905; Honolulu, Territory of Hawaii (now United States)
- Died: February 12, 1981 (aged 75); Honolulu, Hawaii, United States
- Other name: Marjorie Hee
- Occupations: Painter, teacher, nutritionist
- Spouse: Hon Chew Hee

Marjorie Wong Hee (August 31, 1905 – February 12, 1981; née Marjorie Wong) was an American Hawaiian painter, teacher, and nutritionist of Chinese descent. She was the daughter of noted painter Lee Kam Yee "Popo" Wong, and was the wife of painter Hon Chew Hee.

Her art book, My Album Leaves was published in 1973 by the Hawaiian Chinese Watercolor Society. In 1980, Hee was awarded the Honolulu Sertoma International Club's "Freedom Award for Art". She was a board member of the Associated Chinese University Women in Hawaii.

== Publications ==
- Hee, Marjorie Wong (1973). My Album Leaves. Taiwan: Hawaiian Chinese Watercolor Society.
- Hee, Marjorie Wong; Hee, Hon-Chew (1978). Water Colors. H.C. Hee Studio.
