= Mark Chai =

American artist

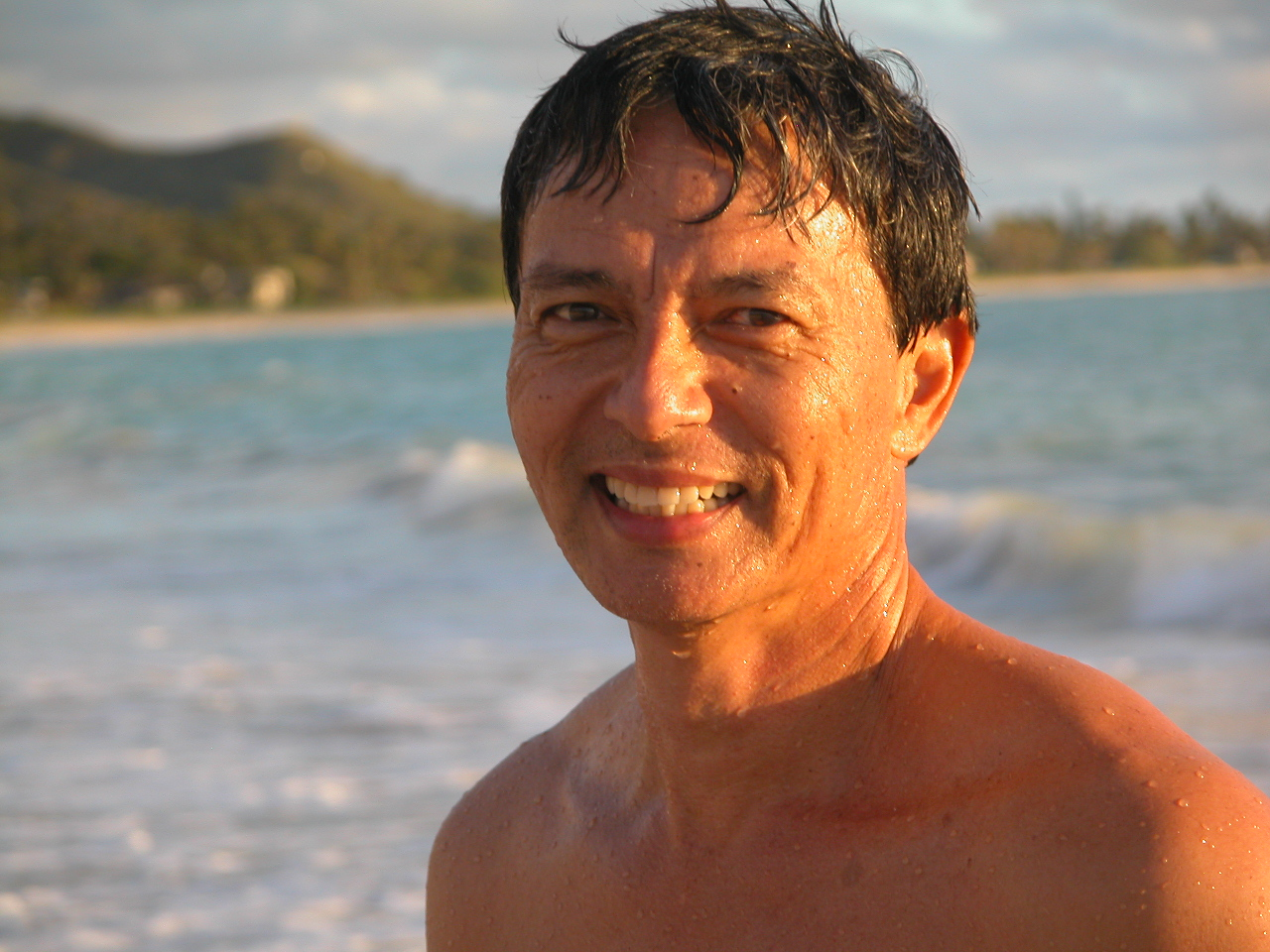
Mark Chai in 2008

Mark Chai (born in Honolulu) is a Native Hawaiian sculptor who designs and handcrafts fine woods and recycled materials into modern lamps, sculpture, large installations and furniture.

His handcrafted modern lamps have been featured in Dwell, the New Yorker, House Beautiful, and Home magazines, as well as in Wallpaper* magazine’s Honolulu City Guide. His work is also seen in Travel & Leisure, and Modern Luxury Hawaii.

The New York Botanical Garden commissioned Chai's "Heliconia" monumental stainless steel sculpture as part of its Georgia O'Keeffe Hawaii retrospective in 2018.

Three of Chai's sculptures are prominently displayed in the lobby of Disney's Aulani Hotel on Oahu. Honolulu magazine named him one of Hawaii's hottest designers. Three of his lamps were featured in the Honolulu Museum of Art's 2016-17 year-long exhibit, "Hawaii in Design." A dozen of his lamps appeared in the Hawaii season of the television show, "Real World." Two of Chai's sculptures of recycled plastic were purchased by the Hawaii State Foundation on Culture and the Arts, and displayed in the Hawaii State Art Museum.

His custom wooden lamps light Chef Ed Kenney's restaurants town, Kaimuki Superette, and Mahina & Sun's, and Art After Dark at the Honolulu Museum of Art.

Chai says his inspirations are childhood memories of the play of light and shadow in glowing camp fires on the beach, moonlight shining through the leaves of palm trees, and watching the precision of craftsmen building a wooden fence in Japan. He wanted to make lamps because, "I wanted to interact with the viewer. What better way than to turn something on?" His work has been described as "cutting edge hanging lamps of intricate interlocking pieces of cut and finished plywood. The effect is origami in thin air with distinctive Hawaii touches." The Culture Trip site listed him as a "giant" of the Hawaii art scene, "Mark Chai's naturalist style transforms everyday table lamps and wooden furniture into expressions of the organic world."

He received his Bachelor of Fine Arts from the University of Hawaiʻi at Mānoa in 1976
