= Esther Shimazu =

American sculptor (born 1957)

- Born: 1957 (age 68–69); Honolulu, Hawaii
- Known for: Ceramics, sculpture
- Website: esthershimazu.com

Esther Shimazu is an American sculptor who was born in Honolulu, Hawaii in 1957. Her grandparents were immigrant laborers from Japan. She attended the University of Hawaii at Manoa before transferring to the University of Massachusetts in Amherst, where she received a Bachelor of Fine Art in 1980 and a Master of Fine Art in 1982.

She is best known for her stoneware sculptures of bald, nude chunky Asian women constructed with hand building techniques. They are colored with slips and oxides, bisque-fired, hand-sanded, and colored further with rubbed-in and airbrushed oxides. Then they are fired to cone 5-6 oxidation and sanded one last time.

She received a Wallace Alexander Gerbode Foundation Purchase Award, 2001, and an Individual Artist Fellowship Award from the Hawaii State Foundation on Culture and the Arts, 1995. In 2020, Shimazu participated in a Zoom webinar offered by the John Natsoulas Center for the Arts called "Learn how to build a dog" where she interacted with viewers while constructing a ceramic dog. Shimazu's work was included in the 2021 Hawai‘i Craftsmen Annual Statewide Exhibition at the Downtown Art Center.
