= John Young Museum of Art =

Hawaiian art museum

Coordinates: 21.296790°N 157.818912°W

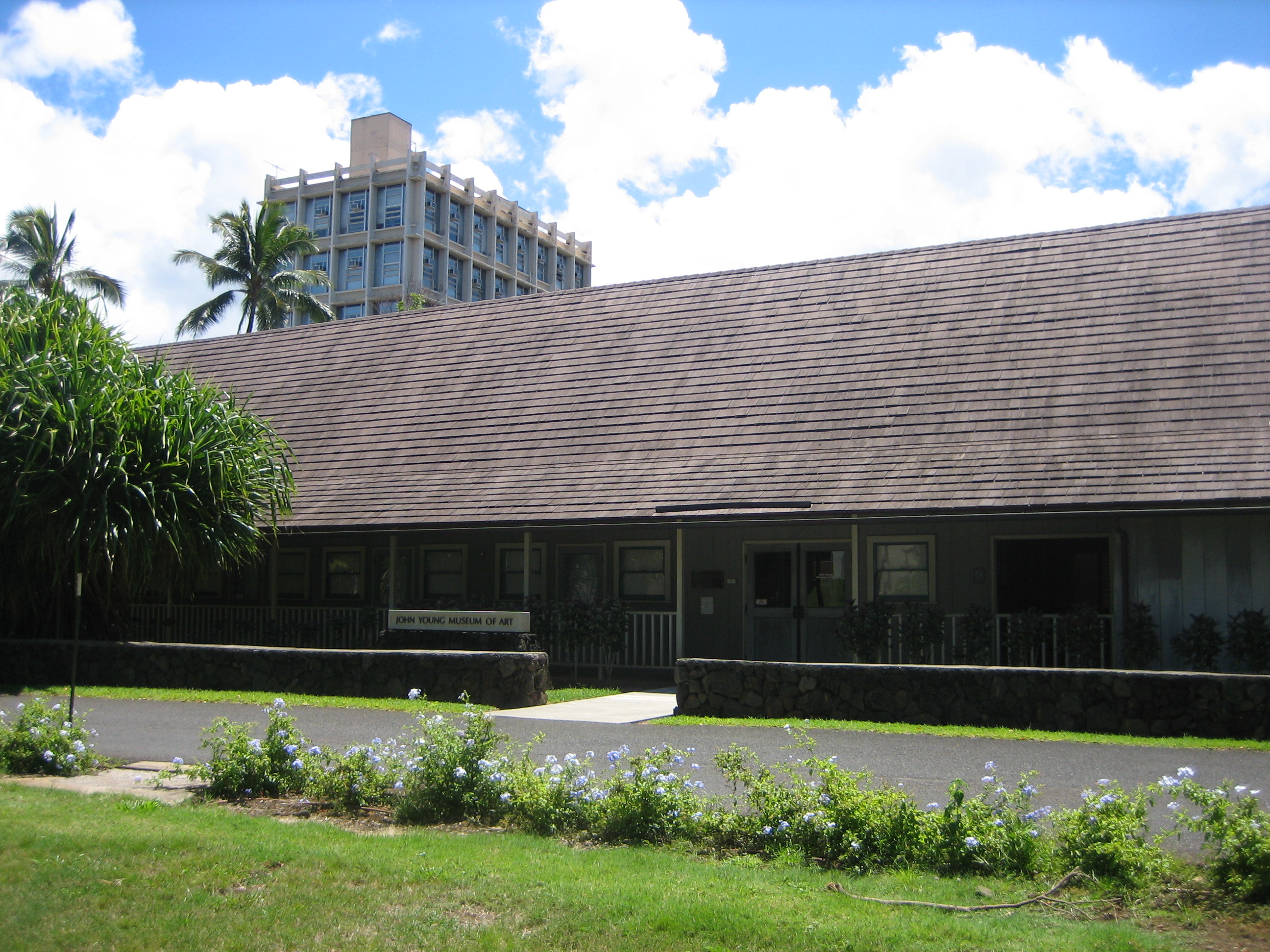
- Established: 1999
- Location: University of Hawaiʻi at Mānoa in Krauss Hall at 2500 Dole Street, Honolulu, Hawaii
- Curator: L. B. Nerio
- Website: http://www.hawaii.edu/johnyoung-museum/

The John Young Museum of Art is a teaching museum on the campus of the University of Hawaiʻi at Mānoa in Honolulu, Hawaii.

The 2,738-square-foot (254.4 m^{2}) museum consists of two exhibition galleries (the Beverly Willis gallery and the Michael J. Marks gallery) and a state-of-the-art object study center housing works of Asian art, Native Hawaiian (Kanaka Maoli) art, and Pacific art. Most of the works in its permanent collection were donated by the American-Hawaiian artist John Chin Young (1909–1997). The museum is housed near the Dole Street entrance to the campus in Krauss Hall, a historic former pineapple research building. It has a large courtyard where public events are held.

From 2019 to 2023, the museum was directed by Maika Pollack.
