= Sally Fletcher-Murchison =

American ceramicist (born 1933)

Sally Fletcher–Murchison
- Born: Sally Jane Fletcher; 1933 (age 92–93); Sacramento, California, U.S.
- Other name: Sally Fletcher Murchison
- Education: University of California, Los Angeles (BFA), University of Hawaiʻi (MFA)
- Occupation: Visual artist
- Known for: Ceramics

Round, Round, hand-built stoneware sculpture by Sally Fletcher-Murchison, 1967, Hawaii State Art Museum

Sally Fletcher–Murchison (born 1933) is an American ceramic artist and teacher.

== Early life and education ==
She was born in 1933, in Sacramento, California, where she grew up.

She received a Bachelor of Fine Art (BFA) degree in advertising art from the University of California, Los Angeles (UCLA) in 1955. She worked as a designer before moving to Hawaii. She studied ceramics at the University of Hawaiʻi, where she received a Master of Fine Art (MFA) degree in 1966.

== Career ==
She has taught at the Hawaii Potters' Guild, the University of Hawaii Lab School, the Hickam Air Force Base Craft Center, and the Honolulu Museum of Art. She is known for her massive hand-built stoneware sculptures that resemble pots, but are nonfunctional, such as the "End Without End" in the collections of the Honolulu Museum of Art.

In 1991, Fletcher–Murchison was part of the juried group exhibition, Artists of Hawaii '91 at the Honolulu Academy of Art; and in 1998, she was part of a three-person exhibition at Leeward Community College in Pearl City, including Doug Doi and Mark Miller.

The Hawaii State Art Museum, and the Honolulu Museum of Art are among the public collections holding work by Fletcher–Murchison.

== Publications ==
- Honolulu Advertiser, "'Personalities' surveys humanity's highs, lows", Sunday, September 14, 2003.
- Yoshihara, Lisa A., Collective Visions, 1967–1997, Hawaii State Foundation on Culture and the Arts, Honolulu, Hawaii, 1997, 105.
