= Mamoru Sato =

Professor Emeritus Mamoru Sato
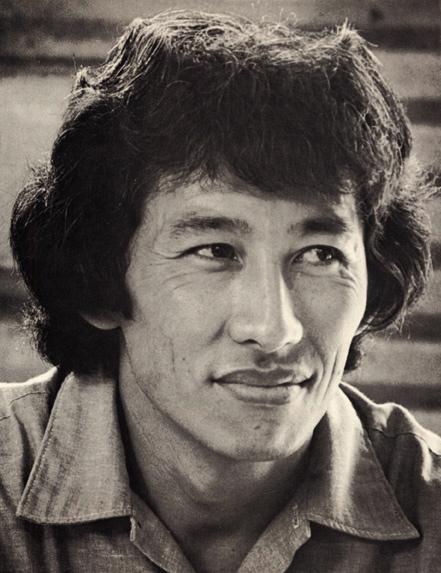
- Born: April 15, 1937 (age 89); El Paso, Texas, U.S.
- Education: University of Colorado Boulder (BA, MFA)
- Occupation: Modernist Sculptor
- Parents: Tetsuro Sato (father); Mitsuye Sato (mother)

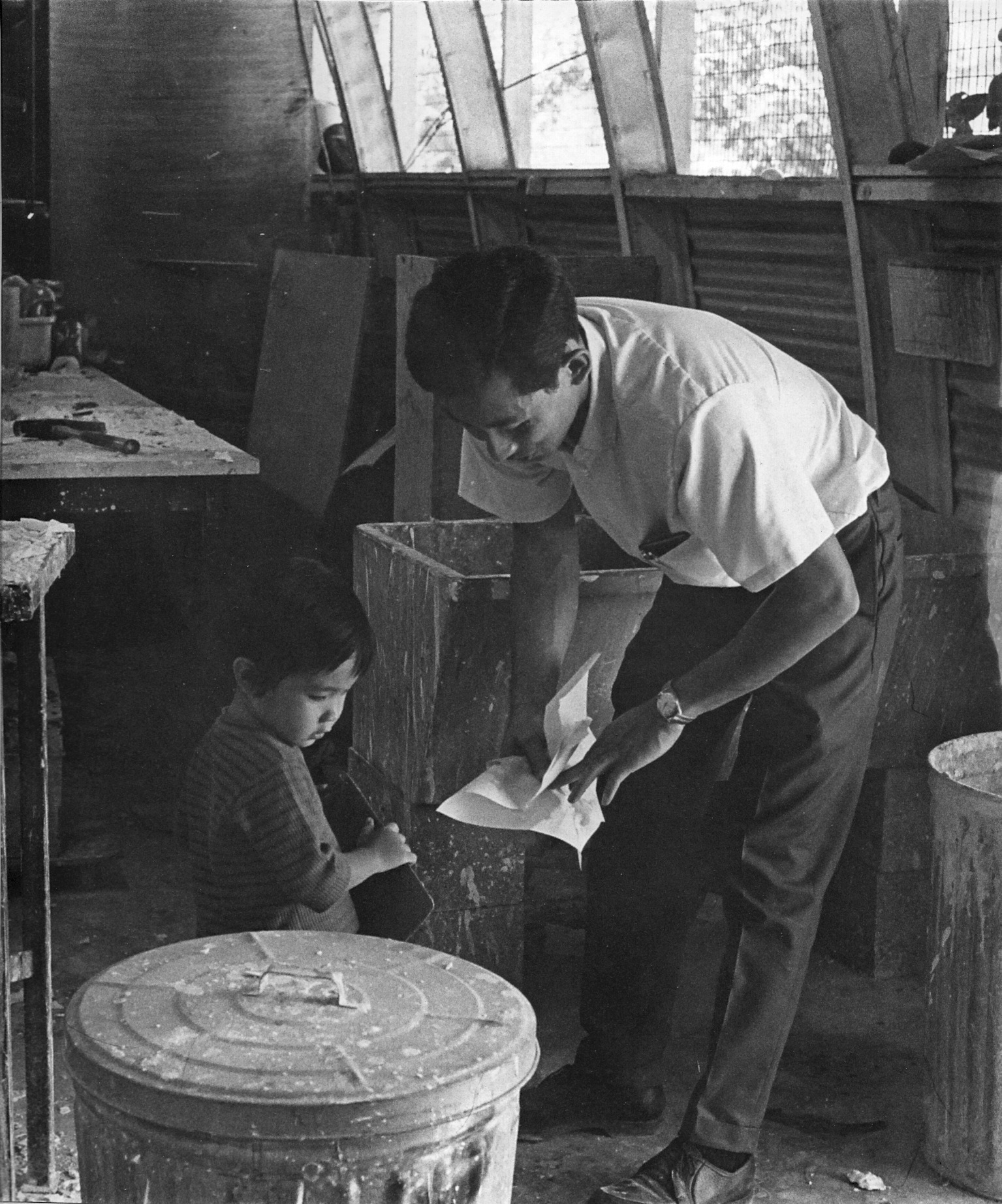
Mamoru with daughter Tristen at UH in the late 1960s

Mamoru Sato is an American modernist sculptor. He was born in El Paso, Texas, in 1937. He initially majored in aeronautical engineering but switched to art, receiving a BFA in Fine Art in 1963 and an MFA in sculpture in 1965, both from the University of Colorado Boulder. He started teaching at the University of Hawaiʻi at Mānoa in 1965. During the summer of 1969, he worked with Tony Smith at the University of Hawai‘i. Smith titled a piece in his For... series for Sato: For M.S.

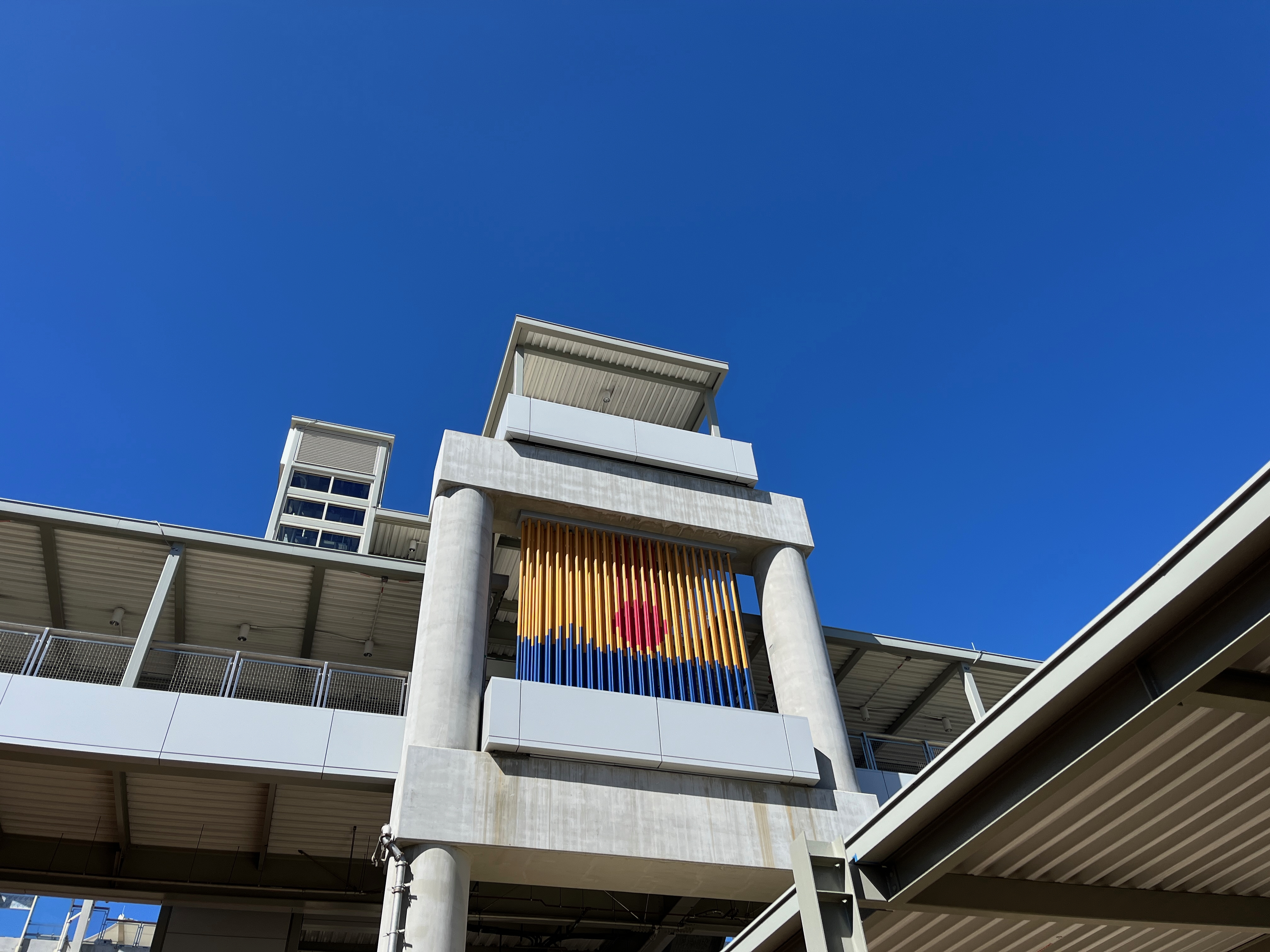
Makai/Ocean, one of two pieces at the newly opened Lelepaua Light Rail Station, which services the Honolulu International Airport—constructed of powder-coated aluminum rods

Sato is best known for his abstract sculptures constructed of industrial materials, such as Sol III, which is made of fiberglass. His commissions include sculpture for the Kona State Office Building (Hawai‘i), Maunawili Elementary School (Hawai‘i), the Reverend Benjamin Parker Elementary School (Hawai‘i), Honolulu International Airport (Hawai‘i), Hilo Hospital (Hawai‘i), Kapiʻolani Community College (Hawai‘i), the Pearl City Culture Center (Hawai‘i), the Makai Parking Structure (Hawai‘i), the Honolulu Community College Library (Hawai‘i), The James Michener Collection (Pipersville, Pennsylvania), and the Hayashide Onsen Hotel (Kagoshima, Japan). Sail II is in the collection of the Hawai‘i State Art Museum.

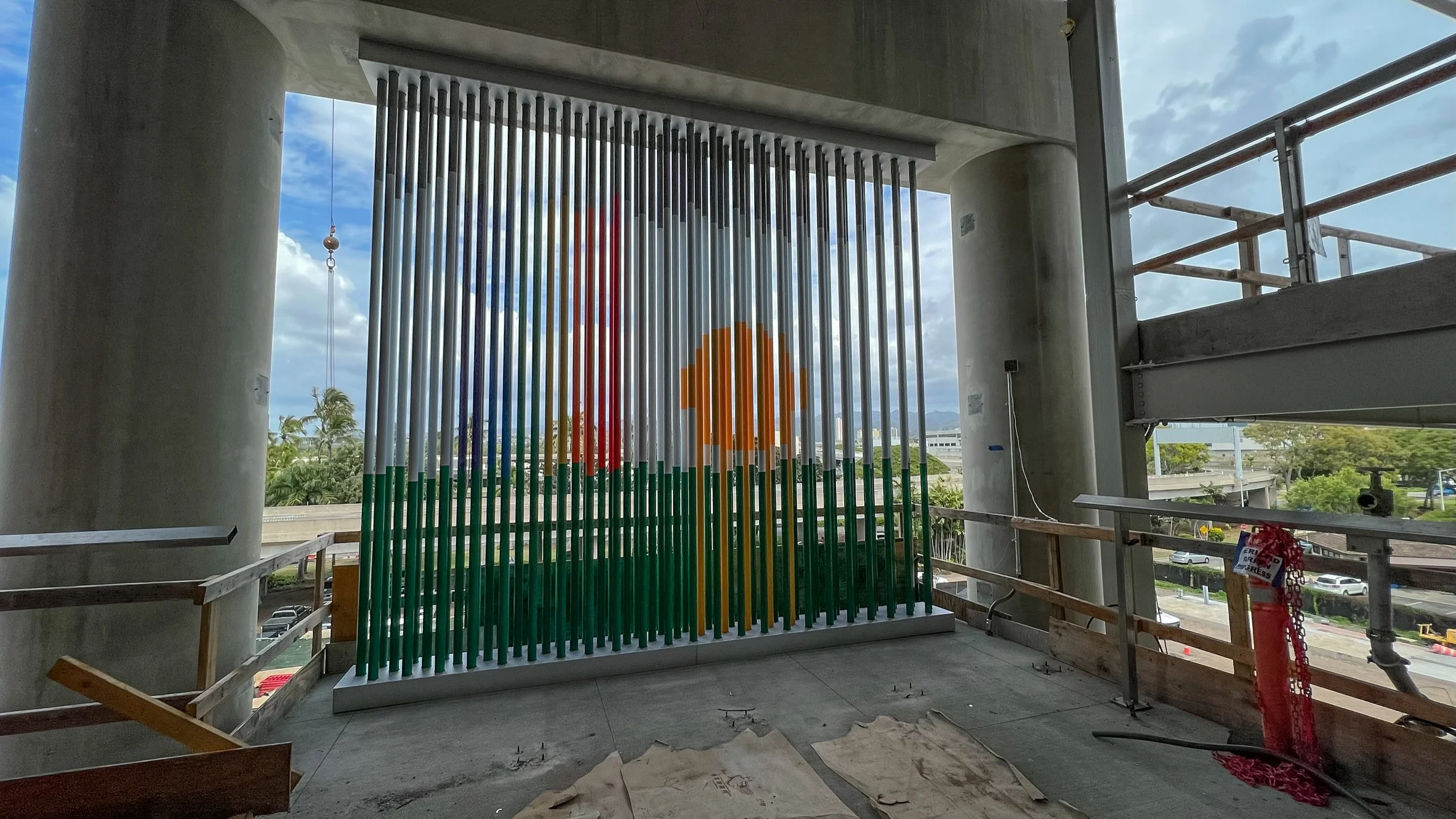
Interior shot of Mauka/Earth, completed in 2023, photography by Timothy Man, Honolulu Authority for Rapid Transportation

== Commissions ==
- Na Manu O Kāne‘ohe 6’h cast concrete and bronze sculpture, Rev. Benjamin Parker Elementary School, Kāne‘ohe, Hawai’i, 2000
- Ho‘olaulima 18'h black terrazzo sculpture, Pearl City Cultural Center, Pearl City, Hawai‘i, 1996
- Passage 18'h bronze and stainless steel arch and four cast bronze figures, State of Hawai‘i Makai Parking Garage, Honolulu, Hawai‘i, 1993
- Forest/Scape 83-3 14' tall, aluminum, stainless steel, 1 of 3 exterior sculptures, Hilo Hospital, Hilo, Hawai‘i, 1986
- Ocean/Scape 83-3 10' diameter, aluminum, stainless steel, 1 of 3 exterior sculptures, Hilo Hospital, Hilo, Hawai‘i, 1986
- Field/Scape 83-3 10' wide, aluminum, stainless steel, lead, 1 of 3 exterior sculptures, Hilo Hospital, Hilo, Hawai‘i, 1986
- Tapa/Grid 83-1 75" tall aluminum and polyester resin sculpture, Teleglobe Canada Building, Wai‘anae, Hawaii, 1983
- Grid/Scape 18"h x 36"w x 28"d aluminum and terrazzo sculpture, University of Hawaii, Honolulu, Hawai‘i, 1982
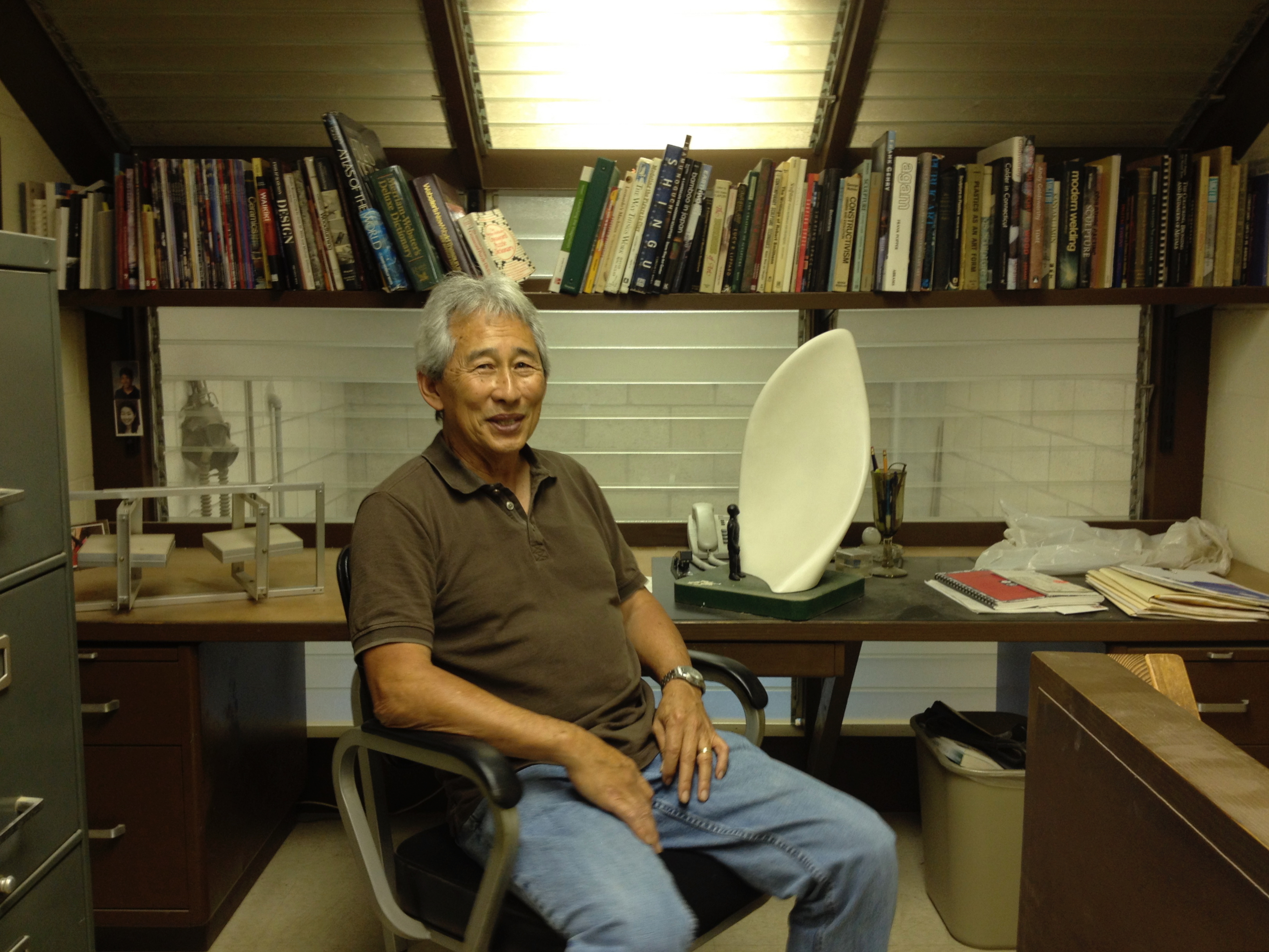
- Mo at work, 2012
  Tapa Tiers 32'h brass and mahogany sculpture, Hilton Hawaiian Village Hotel, Honolulu, Hawai‘i, 1981–82
- Playscape five terrazzo sculptures of various sizes, Maunawili Elementary Schools, Kailua, Hawai‘i, 1977
- Woodscape 15.5’w x 19.5’d koa wood sculpture, Honolulu Community College Library, Honolulu, Hawai‘i, 1975
- Umi 24'w x 28'd aluminum ceiling, Hayashida Onsen Hotel, Kagoshima, Japan, 1972–73
- Dyad 24'h terrazzo sculpture, Honolulu International Airport, Honolulu, Hawai‘i, 1972–73
- Sol V 7' diameter polyester resin sculpture, Advertiser Publishing Co., Honolulu, Hawai‘i, 1971
- Untitled 8'h terrazzo sculpture, Kona State Office Building, Captain Cook, Hawai‘i, 1970
- Sol III 7' diameter vinyl sculpture, original location at Flora Pacifica Exhibition, Honolulu, Hawai‘i, 1970; current location at Kapiolani Community College, Honolulu, Hawai‘i, 2009
- Mauka/Earth and Makai/Ocean powder-coated aluminum rods, Daniel T. Inouye International Airport; the station has opened as of late 2025

== Exhibitions ==
- Artists of Hawai‘i 1986 (Honolulu Academy of Arts, 1986)
- Recent Work (Pegge Hopper Gallery, 2006)
- More of Mo: Sculpture by Mamoru Sato (Japanese Cultural Center of Hawai‘i, 2008)
- More, More of Mo (Aula Gallery, Academy of Fine Arts, Posnan, Poland, 2009)

== Bibliography ==
- Haar, Francis, Artists of Hawai‘i: Volume Two, University of Hawaiʻi Press, Honolulu, 1977, pages 69–73.
- Radford, Georgia and Warren Radford, "Sculpture in the Sun, Hawai‘i's Art for Open Spaces", University of Hawaiʻi Press, 1978, page 96.
- Yoshihara, Lisa A., Collective Visions, 1967-1997, [Hawai‘i] State Foundation on Culture and the Arts, Honolulu, Hawai‘i, 1997, page 146.
