= David Kuraoka =

American ceramic artist

Hanakapiʻai 3, cast, patinated bronze sculpture by David Kuraoka, 2003, Hawaii State Art Museum

David Kuraoka (born 1946) is an American ceramic artist. He was born in Lihue, Hawaii, grew up on the island of Kauai, Hawaii in Hanamaulu and Lihue, and graduated from Kauai High School in 1964. Kuraoka spent his formative years in Hanamaulu where he lived with his parents in his paternal grandmother's home in a plantation labor camp. His father, one of seven children and the only son, became a journalist, writing a weekly column published on Wednesdays, and the Kauai campaign manager for local politician Hiram Fong and Richard Nixon. His mother, Emiko Kuraoka, was a school teacher. He is married to Carol Kuraoka. Kuraoka moved to California in 1964 to study architecture at San Jose City College, eventually transferring to San José State University (San Jose, California) where he received his BA in 1970 and MA 1971. After completing graduate work that focused on ceramics, Kuraoka joined the faculty at San Francisco State University, eventually rising to head its ceramics department.

At the age of 35 he was named a Living Treasures of Hawai'i.

Now retired as professor of art and head of the ceramics department of San Francisco State University, Kuraoka maintains studios in both San Francisco and Kauai, Hawaii.

David Kuraoka said in an artist's statement, "My work is abstract, and my style is simple, clean and crisp." He is best known for large ceramic pieces that are first thrown on a wheel, then further shaped by hand, burnished, covered with rock salt and copper carbonate, and fired in an open pit. He also makes more traditionally shaped ceramics with grayish-green celadon glaze and has begun having some of his organically shaped ceramic pieces cast in bronze, which are patinated to resemble his ceramics. Hanakapi'ai 3, in the collection of the Hawaii State Art Museum, is an example of his bronze sculptures. Kuraoka has also created wall murals.

== Works ==
- Echo, The Contemporary Museum At First Hawaiian Center, Honolulu, Hawaii, 2006
- Hanakapi'ai 3, Hawaii State Art Museum, Honolulu, Hawaii, 2003
- Kumulipo (pit fired ceramic wall installation), Hawaii Convention Center, Honolulu, Hawaii, 1997

== Known Collections ==
- College of San Mateo (San Mateo County, California)
- Honolulu Museum of Art (Honolulu, Hawaii)
- Hawaii State Art Museum (Honolulu, Hawaii)
- Kauai Museum (Lihue, Hawaii)
- White House Art Collection (Washington, D. C.)
- Rotterdam Modern Museum of Art
- Tokyo Metropolitan Teien Art Museum
- Utah State University

== Exhibitions ==
- Honolulu Museum of Art First Hawaiian Center, Honolulu, Hawaii (2012, 2016)
- Honolulu Academy of Arts, Honolulu, Hawaii (2002, 2006)
