= Shirley Russell (artist) =

American painter

Shirley Ximena Hopper Russell
- Born: Shirley Ximena Hopper; May 16, 1886; Del Rey, California
- Died: February 6, 1985 (aged 98); Honolulu, Hawaii
- Education: Stanford University
- Known for: Painting, printmaking
- Movement: Hawaiian Modernism

'Hibiscus Harmony', painting by Shirley Ximena Hopper Russell, c. 1960

Shirley Ximena Hopper Russell (May 16, 1886 – February 6, 1985), also known as Shirley Marie Russell, was an American artist best known for her paintings of Hawaii and her still lifes of Hawaiian flowers.

== Early life and education ==
Shirley Russell was born as Shirley Ximena Hopper in 1886, in Del Rey, California. She graduated in 1907 from Stanford University, where she discovered making art.

== Career ==
In 1909, Shirley married Lawrence Russell, an engineer. When he died in 1912, she began teaching in Palo Alto, California and experimenting with painting. In 1921, she and her son came to Hawaii for a visit and decided to stay.

She studied under Hawaiian artist Lionel Walden during the 1920s and traveling to Europe several times to further her art education. She studied in Paris during the 1930s and the cubist influence can be seen in a number of her works. She taught art at President William McKinley High School in Honolulu for more than 20 years. Around 1935–1936, the Japanese publisher Watanabe Shozaburo (1885–1962) published more than several woodblock prints she designed. The majority of these prints depict colorful and detailed tropical flowers, while at least one print, Carmel Mission, is a California landscape.

In the course of her art career, Russell had three one-woman exhibitions at the Honolulu Museum of Art, and taught art at the University of Hawaii and the Honolulu Museum of Art. She launched many young artists on their careers when they were her students at McKinley High School, including Satoru Abe (1926–2025) and John Chin Young (1909–1997). Although she painted in representational style herself, she was a staunch supporter of abstract art, and did some abstract work herself throughout her career.

She continued to paint almost daily until her death in Honolulu in 1985, at the age of 98.

The Hawaii State Art Museum, Honolulu Museum of Art, Isaacs Art Center, and Tokyo National Museum are among the public collections holding works by Shirley Russell.
