= John Chin Young =

Hawaiian-born American painter (1909–1997)

- Born: March 26, 1909; Honolulu, Territory of Hawaii (now Hawaii, U.S.)
- Died: 1997 (aged 87–88)
- Occupations: Painter, printmaker, art collector
- Movement: Abstract expressionist

Signature
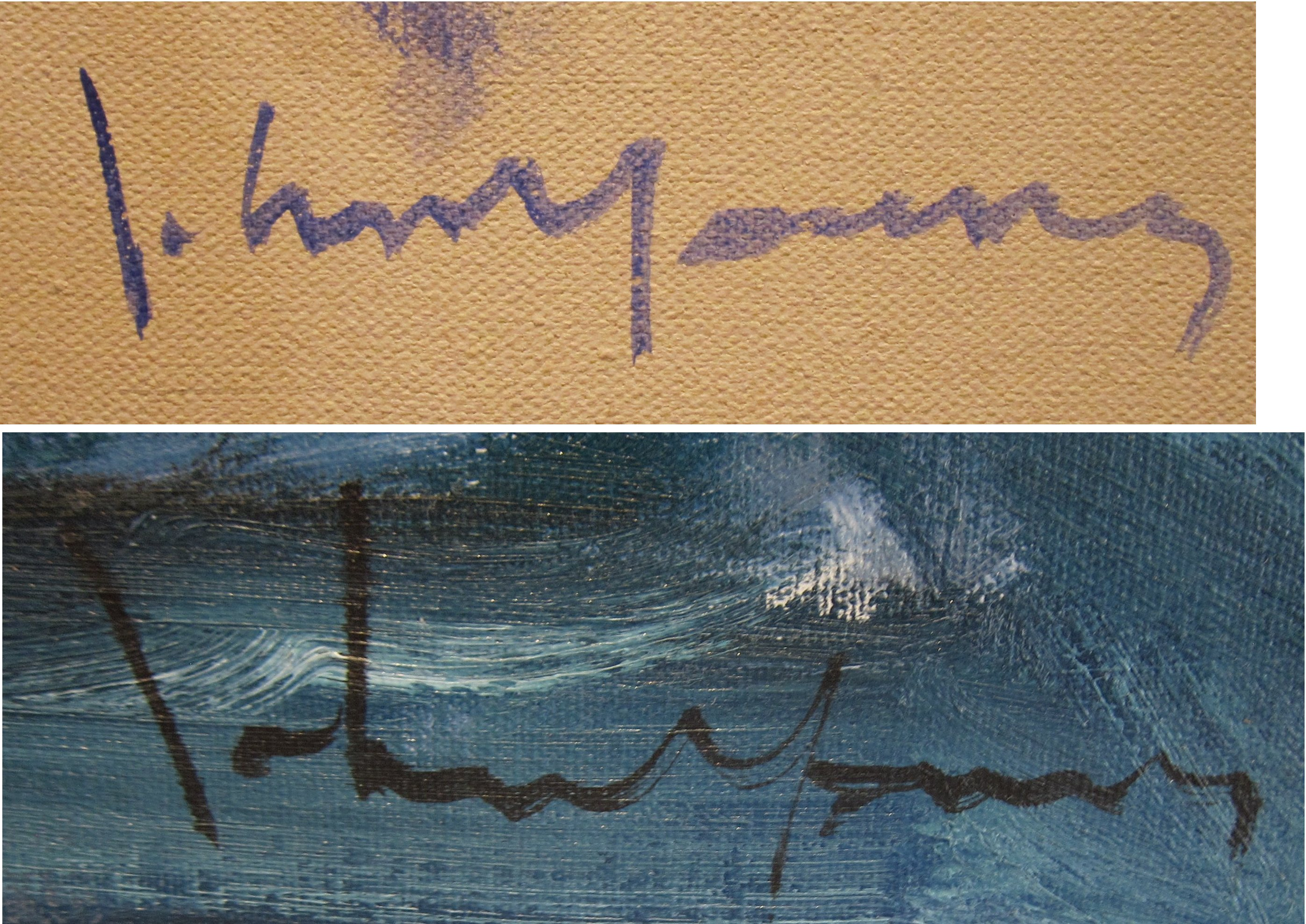

John Chin Young (Chinese: 容澤泉; 1909–1997) was a Hawaiian-born American painter, printmaker, and art collector. Young is best known for his abstract expressionist depictions of horses, paintings of children, and abstract paintings (such as Tantalus).

== Early life ==
Untitled watercolor by John Chin Young, 14.5 x 22 in.

Children on Carousel, oil on canvas painting by John Chin Young, 1975

Tantalus, oil painting by John Chin Young, 1976, Hawaii State Art Museum

John Chin Young was born on March 26, 1909, in Chinatown in Honolulu, Territory of Hawaii (now Hawaii, U.S.). He was the son of Chinese immigrants and began drawing at the age of eight, stimulated by Chinese calligraphy, which he learned in Chinese language school.

Young had his first and only art lessons while a student at President William McKinley High School in Honolulu. Thereafter, his art was entirely self-taught.

== Career ==
Over the years, he acquired an important collection of ancient Asian art, African art, and Pre-Columbian art, which he donated to the Honolulu Museum of Art and the University of Hawaii at Manoa as the John Young Museum.

Young exhibited at the Corcoran Gallery in Washington, D.C., the Metropolitan Museum of Art and the San Francisco Museum of Art. In 1935, he had a solo exhibition at the Honolulu Academy of Art (now Honolulu Museum of Art). Young exhibited his work at the 1939 Golden Gate International Exposition (GGIE) in San Francisco.

Young died in 1997 at the age of 88. His daughter Debbie Young is also a painter residing in Hawaii.

The Art Institute of Chicago, the Honolulu Museum of Art, the Los Angeles County Museum of Art, and the Santa Barbara Museum of Art (California) are among the public collections holding paintings by Young.
