= Ben Norris (artist) =

American painter

The Other Edge of the Clearing, 1998 watercolor by Ben Norris

Shadow Play, acrylic with unryushi (Japanese paper) collage on Masonite by Ben Norris, 1962, Hawaii State Art Museum

Ben Norris (1910–2006) was an American modernist painter.

== Early life ==
He was born in Redlands, California, in 1910 into a middle-class Quaker family that traced its roots, on his mother's side, to the Mayflower and to combatants at the Battle of Bunker Hill. After graduating Phi Beta Kappa from Pomona College in 1930, he won a fellowship at the Fogg Art Museum at Harvard University where he spent a year and then studied at the University of Paris (Sorbonne) for 11 months. He traveled extensively throughout Europe before returning to California to pursue a career as a landscape painter.

== Career ==
As an active participant in the California Watercolor School, he had the opportunity to work closely with landscape artist Thomas Craig (1906–1969). They became friends and in 1936, at Craig's suggestion, Norris accepted the position of first art teacher at the Kamehameha School for Boys in Honolulu. After a year, he joined the art department at the University of Hawaiʻi as an associate professor, and also took printmaking courses from a colleague. He served as department chairman from 1945 to 1955. In 1955, he was awarded a Fulbright professorship to Japan where he was exposed to Asian techniques, motifs and forms.

Norris painted primarily landscapes, and a few still lifes, in the 1930s and 1940s. In the early 1950s, the landscapes became more abstract, and most of his work was completely abstract by the late 1950s. In the mid-1960s, he turned to semi-abstract figurative work. His paintings from the 1970s include Geometric abstraction, nudes, and lush Hawaiian landscapes. He continued painting these lush tropical landscapes into the 21st century. He is best known for his watercolor landscapes (such as The Other Edge of the Clearing) and abstract compositions with a strong Japanese influence, such as Shadow Play. Among public collections holding works by Norris are the Hawaii State Art Museum, the Honolulu Museum of Art, the Isaacs Art Center in Waimea, Hawaii, the Smithsonian American Art Museum (Washington, D.C.) and the Oregon State University Memorial Union (Corvallis, Oregon)

== Death ==
After his retirement in 1975, Norris moved to New York, and then, in 1993, to Stapeley in Germantown, a Quaker sponsored continuing care retirement community in Philadelphia. He died in Philadelphia, Pennsylvania in 2006.
