= Isami Doi =

American painter

Caucasian-Hawaiian, oil on linen painting by Isami Doi, 1939, Hawaii State Art Museum

Early Spring by Isami Doi, 1960,Honolulu Museum of Art

Isami Doi (Japanese: 土井 勇, May 12, 1903 – November 29, 1965) was an American printmaker and painter.

== Biography ==
Doi was the first son of Japanese immigrants, born in Ewa on the island of Oahu in the Hawaiian Islands in 1903. He moved with his family to the island of Kauai, and he thereafter considered Kalaheo, Kauai his home.

Doi studied for two years at the University of Hawaii, went on to Columbia University for five years, and then continued his studies for a year in Paris. In 1927 his print Woodstock Village was named one of the 50 best prints in America. He stayed in New York until 1938, when he returned to the Hawaiian Islands. Doi taught printmaking, drawing, and metal work. He also designed jewelry for the S. and S. Gumps store, a San Francisco firm that had opened a store in Honolulu in 1929, and later for Mings jewelers.

His first solo show at the Honolulu Museum of Art took place in April 1929, and featured painted landscapes of the mountains of Kauai as well as fifteen prints. His early works are painted in muted duns and browns, and have a discreet erotic quality. Mid-way in his career, he included symbols inherited from Greece and Rome, such as centaurs, broken columns, and sphinxes. An example of this is the painting Caucasian-Hawaiian, in the collection of the Hawaii State Art Museum. As his spirituality deepened, his works became closer to pure abstraction, with orange and vermilion signifying flames and light. A simplified Buddha shape is Doi's hieroglyph for meditation. In his last works in the 1960s, he set aside all symbols, returning to painting the cliffs of Kauai, which he had come to view as spiritual entities. Early Spring, in the collection of the Honolulu Museum of Art, is an example of these later abstract paintings.

Doi's works were shown at the New York World's Fair and Treasure Island in San Francisco. His work may also be found in the permanent collection of the National Gallery of Art in Washington, DC.

Doi died in Kalaheo, Hawaii in 1965.

== Legacy ==
Doi inspired other Japanese American artists from Hawaii such as Satoru Abe, showing them that it's possible to have a career as an artist outside of Hawaii while using local themes and motifs.

The Hawaii State Art Museum, the Honolulu Museum of Art, the Nelson-Atkins Museum of Art (Kansas City, Missouri), the Smithsonian American Art Museum (Washington, D. C.) and the University of Michigan Museum of Art (Ann Arbor, Michigan) are among the public collections holding works by Isami Doi.

== Awards ==
- Second prize, Honolulu Print Makers' Sixteenth Show
