= Capitol Modern =

Museum in Honolulu, Hawaii, United States

Coordinates: 21°18′31″N 157°51′30″W

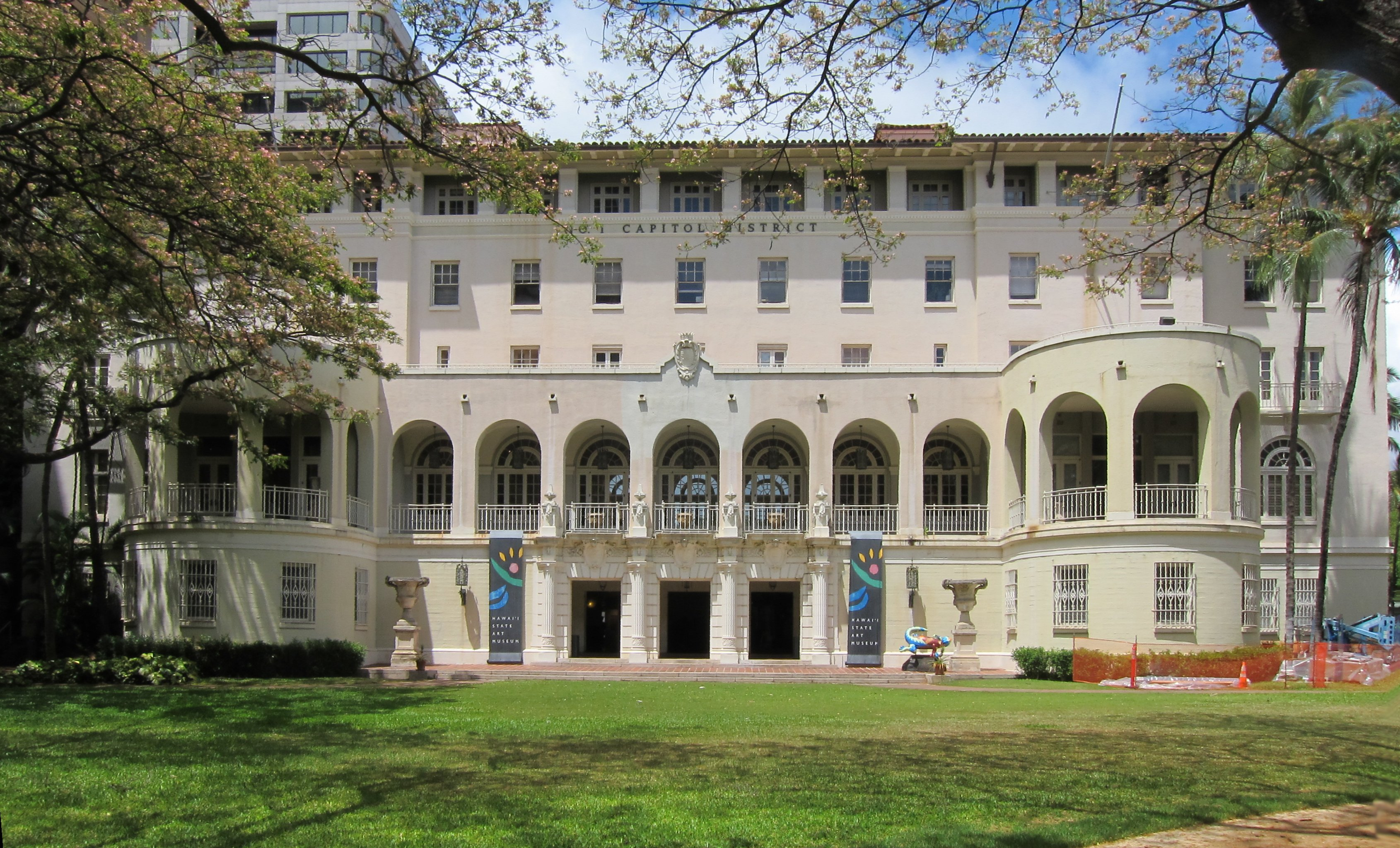
Capitol Modern, No. 1 Capitol District Building (2011)

The Capitol Modern Museum, is a public art museum located on the second floor of the No. 1 Capitol District Building in downtown Honolulu, Hawaii, United States. The museum is operated by the Hawaii State Foundation on Culture and the Arts as a part of their Art in Public Places Program.

The museum rebranded in 2023 to Capitol Modern: the Hawaiʻi State Art Museum and is still formally known as the Hawaiʻi State Art Museum.

== Background ==
The Hawaii State Art Museum first opened on November 1, 2002.

== Current exhibits ==
The museum has temporary exhibitions of artworks from the state's Art in Public Places Collection and annual exhibits of student artworks.

== Critical reception ==
When HiSAM first opened, art critic Amaury Saint-Gilles wrote that the debut collection was "an intriguing melange of island art history weaving a full-colored tapestry".

== Notable artists ==
- Sculptor Satoru Abe (born 1926)
- Sculptor Bumpei Akaji (1921–2002)
- Sculptor Sean K. L. Browne (born 1953)
- Sculptor Edward M. Brownlee (1929–2013)
- Mark Chai (born 1954)
- Jean Charlot (1898–1979)
- Isami Doi (1883–1931)
- Ceramicist Sally Fletcher–Murchison (born 1933)
- Juliette May Fraser (1887–1983)
- Hon Chew Hee (1906–1993)
- Ceramicist Charles Higa (1933-2012)
- Ceramicist Jun Kaneko (born 1942)
- John Melville Kelly (1877–1962)
- Sueko Matsueda Kimura (1912–2001)
- Ceramicist David Kuraoka (born 1946)
- Printmaker Huc-Mazelet Luquiens (1881–1961)
- Ben Norris (1910–2006)
- Louis Pohl (1915–1999)
- Shirley Ximena Hopper Russell (1886–1985)
- Tadashi Sato (1954–2005)
- Sculptor Esther Shimazu (born 1957)
- Ceramicist Toshiko Takaezu (1922–2011)
- Reuben Tam (1916–1991)
- Madge Tennent (1889–1972)
- Masami Teraoka (born 1936)
- Sculptor Michael Tom (1946–1999)
