= Sueko Matsueda Kimura =

American painter (1912–2001)

- Self Portrait of Sueko Matsueda Kimura
- Born: June 10, 1912; Papaikou, Hawaii
- Died: December 25, 2001 (aged 89)
- Known for: Painting
- Spouse: Keichi Kimura (m. 1942–1962)

'Bathers', oil painting by Sueko Kimura, 1954

Sueko Matsueda Kimura (June 10, 1912 – December 25, 2001) was an American artist. She was born in Papaikou, Hawaii in 1912. She received her Bachelor of Arts and Master of Fine Arts degrees from the University of Hawaii at Manoa, where she met fellow art student Keichi Kimura, whom she married in 1942. She also attended the Chouinard Art Institute (Los Angeles), Columbia University (New York City), the Brooklyn Museum Art School (New York City), and with Yasuo Kuniyoshi at the Art Students League of New York. She taught at the University of Hawaii at Manoa from 1952 until her retirement as Professor of Art in 1977.

The Hawaii State Art Museum and the Honolulu Museum of Art hold work by Sueko Matsueda Kimura.
