= Hawaiʻi State Foundation on Culture and the Arts =

Foundation that supports the Culture of Hawaii

- Abbreviation: SFCA
- Formation: 1965
- Type: Governmental organization
- Headquarters: Honolulu, Hawaii, United States
- Executive Director: Karen Ewald

The Hawaiʻi State Foundation on Culture and the Arts was established by the Hawaii State Legislature in 1965 to "promote, perpetuate, preserve, and encourage culture and the arts, history and the humanities as central to the quality of life of the people of Hawaiʻi". It allowed Hawaii to receive federal grants from the National Endowment for the Arts.

In 1967, the Hawaii State Legislature enacted the Art in State Buildings Law, to be administered by the foundation. It mandated that 1% of the construction costs of new state buildings be set aside to purchase art. Hawaii thus became the first state in the United States with a Percent for Art law.

In 1970, the foundation and the state Department of Education jointly established the Artists in the Schools Program, making Hawaii the first state to establish a statewide partnership between schools and professional artists.

In 1989, the Art for State Buildings Law was expanded to establish the Works of Art Special Fund, a permanent fund for the purchase of art, also managed by the foundation.

In the fall of 2002, the Hawaiʻi State Art Museum opened in the No. 1 Capitol District Building, at 250 South Hotel Street in Honolulu, where the Foundation's offices are also located.
