= Craft Alliance =

Art school in St. Louis, Missouri

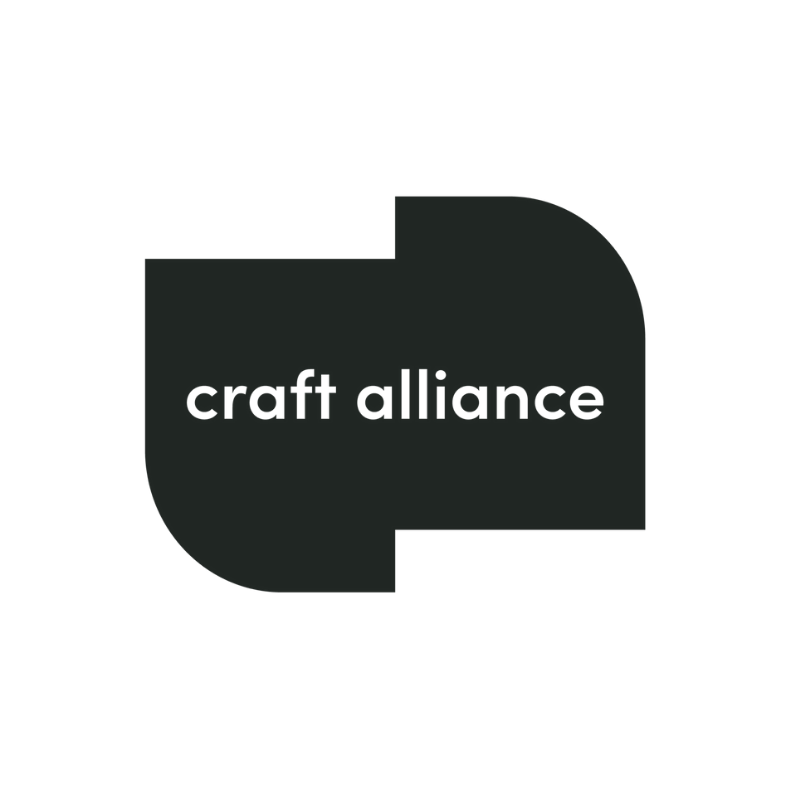

Address
- 5080 Delmar Blvd. St. Louis, Missouri; United States

Information
- School type: 501(c)(3) Arts Education
- Founded: 1964
- President: Jackie Levin
- Director: Bryan Knicely
- Campus type: Urban - City
- Website: https://craftalliance.org
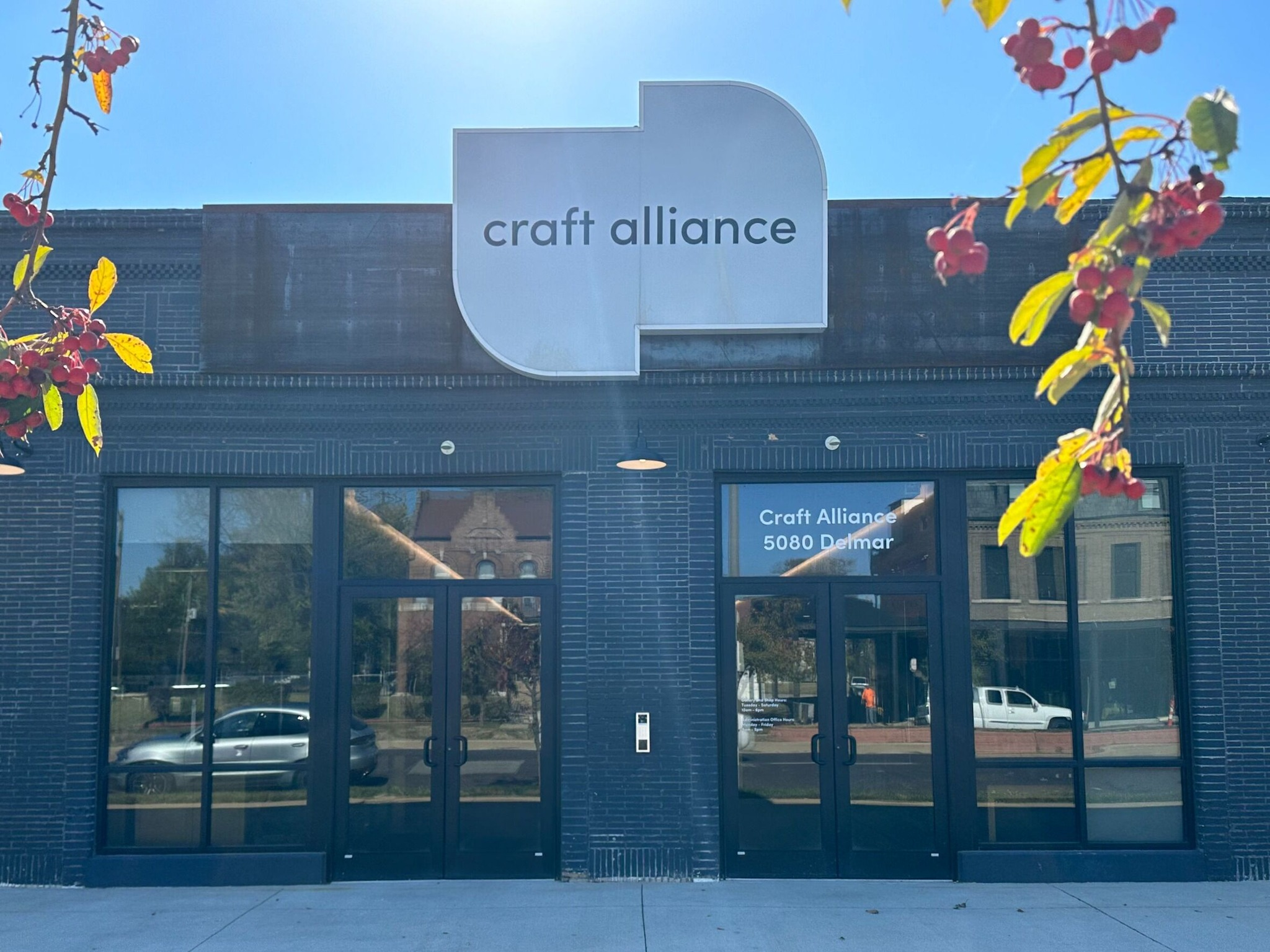
- Craft Alliance on Delmar Blvd

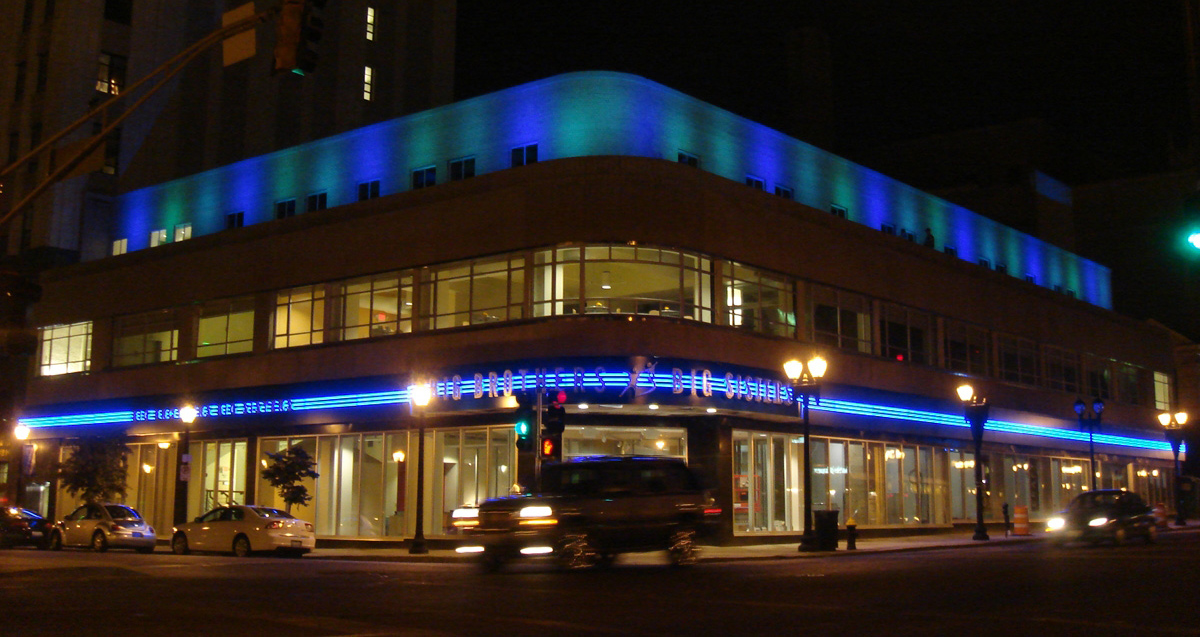
- Craft Alliance in Grand Center

Craft Alliance is an arts education center and 501(c)(3) nonprofit located in St. Louis, Missouri, USA. Founded in 1964, the organization's stated mission is to "enrich and empower communities through craft."

== History ==
Craft Alliance was founded in 1964 as a cooperative gallery, operated by regional craft-based artists in the city of St. Louis. By 1966, Craft Alliance was offering visual arts classes to the community and presenting exhibitions of contemporary craft in the gallery. In 1969 Craft Alliance moved to the western end of the Delmar Loop in University City — at that time an economically depressed street on the border between St. Louis City and St. Louis County. By 2007, The American Planning Association had designated the Delmar Loop as one of "10 Great Streets in America" through its Great Places in America program because of "the sustained efforts of local business, government and the community to achieve successful physical and economic revitalization."

Also in 2007, Craft Alliance's Board of Directors elected to open a satellite facility in Grand Center, the arts and entertainment district of St. Louis city. Located in the Kranzberg Building, Craft Alliance at Grand Center now complements Craft Alliance's University City facility by offering community outreach programs to St. Louis City children and teens, and educational courses for the public in clay, metals, graphics and textiles.

In 2020, Craft Alliance consolidated and moved their location 2 miles east down Delmar Blvd. to 5080 Delmar Blvd. Now part of the Delmar Maker District in conjunction with Third Degree Glass Factory and MADE, Craft Alliance settles into their personalized, retrofitted home. They offer classes, camps, workshops, exhibitions, artist residencies, and house a beautiful gift shop full of handmade art.

In 2024, Craft Alliance dismissed the two 23-24 artists-in-residence and shut down their exhibit, “Planting Seeds, Sprouting Hope,” following opening night. The exhibit featured imagery and slogans used in Palestinian art and the Land Back movement. However, some of these phrases and images were also associated with antisemitic groups and movements that called for extreme violence towards or genocide of Jewish people.

The artists changed the course of their 11-month residency about six weeks before the exhibition. The artists and organization leaders have differing accounts of the approval process leading up to the show. In response, an open letter with over 280 signatories from the community called for a boycott of Craft Alliance, describing the act as "censorship, Anti-Arab racism, Islamophobia, and specifically Anti-Palestinian rhetoric and erasure." The artists expanded and re-opened the exhibit at another St. Louis gallery in collaboration with 20 Palestinian artists. Organization leaders say they were unaware of the full nature of the exhibit prior to the opening night and were not given the time and opportunity to educate the community about such a complex political topic properly. Executive Director Bryan Knicely said, "he wanted the artists to be clearer about their exhibition's message so he could have worked with them on a public education plan to help the community understand the meaning behind the artists' work."

== Overview ==
Nationally recognized as one of the premier craft organizations in the country alongside schools like Penland, Arrowmont and Lillstreet, Craft Alliance is dedicated to the study of traditional craft mediums within contemporary contexts. Craft Alliance offers annual exhibition programming with a focus on contemporary craft; classes and workshops in ceramic art, metal-smithing, fibers (weaving, felting, etc.), glassworking, blacksmithing, and woodturning; artist residencies, free community programs for area families and local schools; and a gallery shop. With an annual operating budget of $1.8 million, Craft Alliance serves more than 50,000 people every year.

== Notable figures ==
A number of notable artists have taught, studied, or exhibited work at Craft Alliance throughout the past 50 years.

=== Past exhibiting artists ===
- Kate Anderson
- Rudy Autio
- Howard Ben Tre
- Wendell Castle
- Sonya Clark
- Cynthia Consentino
- Lia Cook
- Richard DeVore
- Paul Dresang
- Ruth Duckworth
- Chris Gustin
- Michael Lucero
- Ed Moulthrop
- Richard Notkin
- Albert Paley
- Guerra de la Paz
- Ed Rossbach
- Joyce Scott
- Heikki Seppä
- Therman Statom
- Jane Sauer
- Ester Shimazu
- Helen Shirk
- Victor Spinski
- Aiko Takamori
- Patti Warashina
- Beatrice Wood
- Betty Woodman

=== Teaching artists ===
- Tom McCarthy
- Peg Fetter
- Qun Liu
- Melissa Schmidt
- Lisa Colby
