= Canton Museum of Art (Ohio) =

American community arts organization

Coordinates: 40.806761°N 81.371784°W

The Canton Museum of Art, founded in 1935, is a community arts nonprofit organization designed to encourage and promote the fine arts in Canton, Ohio.

The museum’s objective is “to provide a permanent museum for the collecting and preservation of art objects.” Operating under this broad mandate, the museum began to purchase the work of local and regional artists. Much of the museum's collections are dedicated to the work of local and regional artists in the Canton area. Gifts from local patrons and corporate benefactors from their personal art collections are also included in the museum's holdings.

The museum focuses on exposing the public to art and documenting local history. The purchases of works by local artists and the acceptance of donations were the two major influences on the development of the permanent collection until the museum moved into the Cultural Center for the Arts in 1970. At that time, the museum’s board decided that the permanent collection should be focused on a more specific collecting area. The Ralph L. Wilson Collection of American Art, gifted in the 1970s, was a significant step toward the eventual focus on 19th and 20th-century American artists.

== History ==
The Canton Museum of Art began as the Little Civic Art Gallery, which was founded in the Canton Public Library in 1935. A year later, the organization became known as the Canton Art Institute and an active program of exhibits and educational programs flourished throughout the late 1930s. In its early days (1935–1945), the museum served largely as an exhibition and meeting place for local artists; at the time, collecting was not a prime objective. In 1941, the Frank E. Case Mansion was donated and renovated to become the home of the Institute. During the next thirty years, CAI became a focal point for the arts in Canton, supporting affiliate organizations such as Canton Fine Arts Associates. It provided a home for the offices of the Canton Symphony and facilities for the Madrigal Singers, Canton Chamber Music Society and the Players’ Guild.

When the Cultural Center for the Arts was established in 1970, all of the arts in Canton were centralized. The Institute began a program of expanded exhibits and art classes. Educational initiatives, such as the Humanities program with the Canton City Schools, were begun and new affiliate organizations, including the Museum Guild, the Players’ Guild Theatre, and the Potter's Guild were founded.

During the 1980s, the Board of Trustees and CMA Staff began to clarify the goals and direction of the Museum. In 1989, a unique focus for the Permanent Collection was approved by the CMC and Board of Trustees: 19th and 20th Century American works on paper and American ceramics, 1950s and forward.

The 1980s CAI shows include a Goya exhibit, two successful exhibitions of Ohio’s quilts and a commemoration of the Statue of Liberty’s centennial. In the 1990s, the museum presented a broad variety of exhibits, including innovative projects such as Ubu Roi and The Power of If involving students, teachers and area artists. A CMA original exhibit, "Ultra-Realistic Sculpture by Mark Sijan", that was presented in 1992, went on an extended national tour. The museum's educational efforts included Outreach programs and Art Experience Days.

CMA celebrated its 60th anniversary in 1995 and assumed a new identity as The Canton Museum of Art. In 1997-98, the Museum presented "Norman Rockwell’s America," the most successful exhibit in the Museum’s history and hosted a touring exhibition from the United States Holocaust Memorial Museum, "The Nazi Olympics—Berlin 1936." In 2004, the Museum presented the prestigious "Andrew Wyeth: The Helga Pictures" exhibit to over 12,000 patrons in six weeks.

== Museum overview ==
CMA offers 12 to 15 exhibitions throughout the year. In this rotation, the main exhibition is often accompanied by two smaller exhibitions of regional artists and a presentation of works from the permanent collection developed around a theme. Permanent Collection exhibitions might contain works by significant American, European and regional artists.

Once a year gallery space is devoted to art by high school students in Canton and Stark County. The high school shows are juried and financial scholarships are awarded for both college and CMA art classes.

Affiliate groups have two fund-raisers annually that are intended as social events for the community. The “Antiques in Canton” Show & Sale has a nationally known guest curator, and “Christkindl Market” is a juried arts and craft show bringing over 100 craftsmen from around the country.

The Museum’s Education Department provides the public with studio art classes and workshops. Educational Outreach programs take the museum off-site to libraries, parochial schools, area public schools, five inner-city schools and a special school for students with behavioral disorders. Docent-led school tours are available for current exhibitions and art experience days allow students to participate in hands-on projects.

For over 20 years, the Canton City school district has offered special Humanities courses to its students at the Museum. And Kent State University, Stark Campus schedules its ceramic classes in the museum's Pot Shop. The CMA is a regular meeting place for a number of community and civic organizations such as the Rotary, the Canton Garden Club, and Prime Time, a seniors group affiliated with a local hospital.

== Permanent collection ==
The Canton Museum of Art’s Permanent Collection

Foescon is 19th, 20th and 21st-century American works on paper and contemporary ceramics, 1950s and forward. Major categories are American drawings; American watercolors; American prints and American ceramics. This focus is unique among museums in northeast Ohio – an area that included museums like the Akron Art Museum, The Butler Institute of American Art and the Cleveland Museum of Art.

The collection focus was enhanced through the gift of a collection of watercolors and drawings from Ralph L. Wilson in the 1970s. Included in his gift were works by Burchfield, Demuth, Feininger, Henri, Keller, Marin, Maurer, Prendergast, Shinn and Sommer. Augmenting the watercolor collection are the purchased works of Thomas Hart Benton, Oscar Bluemner, Milton Hirschl, Carolyn Brady, Winslow Homer, Edward Hopper, George Luks, Jan Multaka, Joseph Raffael, John Singer Sargent and Andrew Wyeth. The print collection contains work by Romare Bearden, Thomas Hart Benton, Alexander Calder, Mary Cassatt, Roy Lichtenstein, Mary Nimmo Moran, Philip Pearlstein, Robert Rauschenberg, Larry Rivers and Andy Warhol.

Contemporary ceramics 1950s and forward is a focus for the Museum. Ohio’s history of ceramics includes the decorative pottery work of Roseville, Rookwood, Weller and McCoy and the Museum’s focus extends this interest in pottery with contemporary works. The collection contains works by Jack Earl, Maija Grotell, Marilyn Levine, Toshiko Takaezu and Patti Warashina among others. In the past three years, the collection has been expanded through gifts and purchases with works by Ken Ferguson, Karen Karnes, Don Pilcher, Don Reitz and Victor Spinski.

Since 1992, the Museum has purchased watercolors by Thomas Hart Benton, Oscar Bluemner, Carolyn Brady, Winslow Homer, Edward Hopper, George Luks, Jan Multaka, Joseph Raffael and John Singer Sargent. The ceramic collection was supplemented with purchases of works by Brother Thomas Bezanson, Ken Ferguson, Karen Karnes, Roberta Laidman and Victor Spinski. In addition, the Museum accepted gifts of works by Don Pilcher and Don Reitz.

The permanent collection serves as the foundation for the Museum’s exhibition programs. It is used in ongoing exhibits of the Permanent Collection (mindful of the special rotation requirements of watercolors and works on paper), and as the core of special exhibits created with loans from other institutions.
