= Hirschl =

Hirschl is a German surname. Notable people with the surname include:

- Adolf Hirémy-Hirschl, Hungarian artist
- Friedrich Hirschl (born 1888, date of death unknown), Austrian footballer
- Milton Hirschl (1917–1999), American artist
- Nickolaus Hirschl, Austrian sport wrestler
- Ran Hirschl (1963–2026), Israeli-Canadian political scientist
- Tamar Hirschl, Croatian-American artist

== See also ==
- Ivica Hiršl, Croatian communist and Mayor of Koprivnica
- Hirsch (disambiguation)
- Hersch
