= Kosta Kulundzic =

Artist

- Born: 1972 (age 53–54); Belgrade
- Education: École des Beaux-Arts
- Known for: Painting, drawing
- Movement: Under Realism
- Awards: Claude Berthault Prize, 2012
- Website: https://www.kulundzic.com

Kosta Kulundzic (born 1972) is an artist.

== Biography ==
Kulundzic was originally trained as an architect and graduated from the École nationale supérieure des Beaux-Arts de Paris (Paris National Fine Arts School) in 1998. In 2012, he was awarded the Claude Berthault prize.

He has taught at the Ecole Nationale Supérieure d’Architecture of Paris Val-de-Seine, at Paris-Sud University, at Honolulu Museum of Art School and he now teaches classical drawing at the University of Hawai'i. Kosta Kulundzic is the grandson of an orthodox priest. He is of Serbian descent.

== Work ==
In 2012, Kosta Kulundzic founded the Under Realist movement with Serbian artist Vuk Vidor and French artist Stephan Pencréac’h. The movement was created as a reaction against the over-conceptualisation of contemporary painting: for them, the image is more important than the idea. The Under Realism is a grouping of artists who share the same vision of the artist's condition and are trying to free themselves from the diktats of markets and trends.

Kulundzic's grandfather was an orthodox priest, which reflect in his work as he builds parallels between religious texts and the violence of contemporary society. He stages a carnivalesque reversal of values, and depicts a world in which women took power over men and perform the most ghastly of crimes in a playful atmosphere.

Kosta Kulundzic has shown that he was a committed artist on several occasions. For instance he sketched the hearings of the trial between Trump and the State of Hawaii in 2017. He has shown his work in (Germany), Belgium, Bosnia, China; Croatia, United States, Italy, Morocco, Poland, Serbia, Slovenia, Switzerland or Turkey.

In 2018, Kosta Kulundizc was selected for an artistic project and asked to paint two in situ frescoes in the car park of the Royal Hamilius, in Luxembourg, a building designed by the architect Sir Norman Foster. Artists Dorothée Louise Recker, Lise Stoufflet, Gaëtan Henrioux, Axel Sanson and Valentina Canseco also participated in the project.

== Shows ==
=== Solo shows ===
2020:

- Hawaii Epiphany at The Brugier Rigail Gallery, Paris, France
- Hawaii Epiphany at The Gallery at The Hawaii Theatre, Honolulu

2019:

- Tropic iconic Suzanne Zahr Gallery, Seattle USA

2017:

- Kosta Kulundzic by Kosta Kulundzic, Commons Gallery, University of Hawaii

2016:

- Bloody Icons, SZ Gallery, Seattle, United States

2015:

- The Soon Art Fair, Paris, France.

2014:

- Ugly Beast & Vicious Girls, RassonArt Gallery, Tournai, Belgium

2013:

- Hawaii Apocalypse, Gallery SPF Projects, Honolulu, United States

2011:

- Matthieu, Georges et Judith. Des histoires sanglantes, Épinal, France.
- Moja religija, Ozone Art Center, Belgrade, Serbia
- The Bloody Hell, The Studio, Belgrade, Serbia
- Judith & George, Musée des Arts et Métiers, Paris, France.

2010:

- Blood & Faith, Progress Gallery, Belgrade, Serbia.
- Was It Us?, Art Center Duplex, Sarajevo, Bosnia.

2009:

- Judith, Galerie Magda Danysz, Paris, France.

2008:

- La Croix, Centre culturel de Serbie, Paris, France.
- Exposition à la Galerie Raphael 12, Frankfurt, Germany.

2007:

- Ma Religion, Galerie Magda Danysz, Paris, France.
- Marrakech Upside Down, Light Gallery, Marrakesh, Morocco.

2006:

- The Blood Chapelle, Nuit blanche, Paris, France.

2004:

- Idols, Galerie Sparts, Paris, France.

2003:

- Sacred & Profane, Serbia Cultural Center, Paris, France.

2002:

- God today, Galerie Mabel Semmler, Paris, France.

2000:

- Angels & Idiots, Galerie Mabel Semmler, Paris, France.

1998:

- First step, Galerie Mabel Semmler, Paris, France.

1997:

- Espace Furstemberg, Paris, France.

1994:

- Galerie GMBA, Paris, France.

=== Group shows ===
2018:

- Exhibition at Honolulu Museum of Art School, Honolulu, United States
- Action ! La Nouvelle École française: première époque, Bastille Design Center, Paris.

2017:

- Kunst Shore, Projektraum Ventilator, Berlin, Germany.
- Maria Impuls der Zeit, Warendorf, Germany.
- CONTACT 3017, Honolulu Museum of Art School, Honolulu, United States.
- URBAN Underground ArtafterDark, Honolulu Museum of Art School, Honolulu, United States.
- Blanc Blank, The Studio, Belgrade, Serbia.
- Dev9t, Belgrade, Serbia.
- Paris Mai, Galerie Luc Berthier, Paris, France.

2016:

- In Response to War, National Museum of Kielce, Poland.
- Hybride Kunst, Projektraum Ventilator, Berlin, Germany.
- Liot, Kulundzic, Pas, Revisited, Galerie Raphael, Frankfurt, Germany.
- Eros Disorder, Galerie Luc Berthier, Paris, France.
- Kupujemo Domace, Gallery Duplex 100m2, Sarajevo, Bosnia.
- Voyelles, France & Ambre Art Center, Casablanca, Morocco.

2015:

- Bestiary, Rasson Art Gallery, Tournai, Belgium.
- Under realism / Sous réalisme, Galerie Da-End, Paris, France.
- Who's afraid of picture(s), Grenoble et Perpignan, France.
- Cabinet Da-End V, Galerie Da-End, Paris, France.
- ICON, Galerie Luc Berthier, Paris, France.

2014:

- Contemporary Art Exhibition of Central and Eastern Europe, Ningbo, China.
- Under realism / Sous réalisme, Galerie C, Neuchâtel, Switzerland.
- One More Time, Rasson Art Gallery Tournai, Belgium.
- Cabinet Da-End IV, Galerie Da-End, Paris, France.
- In response to War, Château d'Hardelot, France.

2013:

- Under realism / Sous réalisme / Podrealizam, Perpignan, France.
- Exposition internationale de Peinture, Rijeka Modern and Contemporary Art Museum, Croatia.
- Apocalypse Show, Galerie Pierrick Touchefeu, Sceaux, France.
- Several Moments Later, Rouge Cloitre Art Center, Brussels, Belgium.

2012:

- Based on a true story, Aeroplastics Contemporary, Brussels, Belgium.
- Several Moments Later, Couvent des Cordeliers, Paris, France.
- Summer Show, Galerie Samantha Sellem, Paris, France.
- Beautiful painting is behind us, Umetnostna Galleria Contemporary Museum, Maribor, Slovenia.
- Under realism / Sous réalisme / Podrealizam, Galerie Progrès, Belgrade, Serbia.

2011:

- Paris Forever, Galerie Magda Danysz, Paris, France.
- Dessins Exquis, Slick, Paris, France.
- Chase the Dragon, Galerie Magda Danysz, Paris, France.
- Beautiful painting is behind us, Ankara Contemporary museum, Ankara, Turkey.

2010:

- Beautiful painting is behind us, Entrepôt n°5, Istanbul, Turkey.
- If not now when, Bishop Museum, Honolulu, United States.
- Speed Painting, Galerie Magda Danysz, Paris, France.

2009:

- 40 years of figurative painting in France, Périgueux cultural art center, France.
- The Drawing Art, 18Gallery, Shanghai, China.

2006:

- Art 212, Contemporary Art Fair, New York City, United States.

1999:

- Artists against war, San Francisco, United States.

1998:

- Performance, Super Club, Savion Glover Tap Dance Company, New York City, United States.

1995:

- International Art Prize, Monaco.
- Aqualta group, Galerie Campo St Toma, Venice, Italy.
- Performance for Kodak, Disneyland Paris.

1993:

- Exhibition at the Cartier Foundation, Manifestation L'Oréal, Paris, France.
- Exhibition at the National Assembly, Paris, France.
