= Toshiko Takaezu =

American ceramic artist (1922–2011)

- Born: June 17, 1922; Pepeekeo, Hawaii, U.S.
- Died: March 9, 2011 (aged 88); Honolulu, Hawaii, U.S.
- Education: Honolulu Museum of Art School, University of Hawaiʻi, Cranbrook Academy of Art
- Occupations: Ceramist, painter, sculptor, educator
- Known for: Pottery
- Website: toshikotakaezufoundation.org

Toshiko Takaezu (June 17, 1922 – March 9, 2011) was an American ceramic artist, painter, sculptor, textile artist and educator whose body of work spanned a wide range of mediums, including ceramics, weavings, bronzes, and paintings. She was noted for her pioneering work in ceramics and played an important role in the international revival of interest in the ceramic arts. Takaezu is known for her rounded, closed ceramic forms which broke from traditions of clay as a medium for functional objects. Instead she explored clay's potential for aesthetic expression, taking on Abstract Expressionist concepts in a manner that places her work in the realm of postwar abstractionism. She was of Japanese descent and from Pepeʻekeo, Hawaii.

Takaezu is recognized as one of a number of ceramic artists in the 1950s and 1960s who were instrumental in moving the practice of ceramics beyond a commercial trade to become a form of artistic expression. A major retrospective of her work at the Museum of Fine Arts Boston in 2023, and a traveling retrospective organized by The Isamu Noguchi Foundation and Garden Museum to be launched at The Noguchi Museum in 2024 are reflective of the recent revival of interest in her practice and legacy.

== Early life and education ==
Takaezu was born the middle child of eleven to Japanese immigrant parents in Pepeʻekeo, Hawaii, on 17 June 1922. Her parents had immigrated from the Japanese town of Gushikawa on the island of Okinawa. As a child, Takaezu helped her father and uncle farm watercress and raise honey bees. Coming from a family of few means, she left high school to support her family. Her parents maintained a traditional Japanese lifestyle: shoes were removed upon entering the house, breakfast consisted of miso soup and rice, sleeping was on the floor. Takaezu did not learn to speak English until she entered first grade. At the age of nine, her family moved to Maui, where her grade school—under the direction of a progressive principal—encouraged students to read and recite poetry and to draw. It was there that she received her first exposure to the arts.

After graduating from high school in 1940, she went to stay with her older sisters in Honolulu, where she worked at the Hawaii Potter's Guild creating identical pieces from press molds. The Hawaii Potter's Guild was a commercial pottery studio owned by the Gantt family. It was there, during World War II, that Takaezu first worked with clay, producing ashtrays and other functional items in press molds. While she hated creating hundreds of identical pieces, she appreciated that she could practice glazing. At the pottery guild, Takaezu met Carl Massa, a New York sculptor who was with the Special Services Division of the U.S. Army. Massa became an important inspiration for her, teaching and encouraging her to create sculpture and to read books such as Ayn Rand’s The Fountainhead and Irving Stone’s Lust for Life, an interpretation of Van Gogh’s life story. Eager to learn more about the lives and careers of artists, Takaezu enrolled in Saturday painting classes at the Honolulu Museum of Art School (1947-1949) studying with Louis Pohl and Ralston Crawford. She then attended the University of Hawaiʻi (1948-1951) where she studied under Claude Horan beginning in 1947. Horan was impressed by her talent and energy, and pushed Takaezu to study on the mainland. He became an important influence in expanding her vision and helping her develop a strong technical foundation for her work. Although clay was her primary interest, Takaezu also took classes in design, art history, and weaving. In the textile program under the tutelage of Hester Robinson, she experimented with natural dyes and plant materials such as banana stocks. These early flat-weave experiments sparked an enduring interest in textiles.

In 1948, Takaezu began teaching a ceramics class at the YWCA in Honolulu, where she discovered her deep love for teaching and inspiring students. After the second year, she realized that becoming a fine art teacher required further study. Her instinct for self-motivation–fostered by growing up in a large family—told her it was time to leave Hawaii and travel to the mainland. From 1951 to 1954, she continued her studies at Cranbrook Academy of Art in Bloomfield Hills, Michigan (1951), where she studied sculpture with William McVey and weaving with Marianne Strengell, and met Finnish ceramist Maija Grotell, to whom she became an assistant in 1953. A pivotal influence and mentor on her development as an artist, Grotell was, in Takaezu’s view, "an unusual and rare human being who felt it was important for students to become individuals. It was through her criticism that I began to discover who I was." After becoming Grotell's assistant, Takaezu also began her teaching career. She instructed summer courses at the Cranbrook Academy from 1954 to 1956. She also taught art education courses at the University of Wisconsin-Madison in the Fall of 1954 and Spring of 1955. Although working in clay was her main interest, while studying with Marianne Strengell at Cranbrook, Takaezu became interested in the creative potential of fiber. Responding to the texture of yarn and its rich color possibilities, she approached weaving as a different way of thinking and developing ideas. Takaezu earned an award after her first year of study, which acknowledged her as an outstanding student in the clay department. She also taught summer sessions at the Cleveland Institute of Art (1955–64), where she became head of the ceramic department.

A grant from the Louis Comfort Tiffany Foundation in 1964 allowed Takaezu to break from full-time teaching and take a studio in Clinton, New Jersey, where she took on apprentices throughout her career. In a 2003 oral history interview with the Archives of American Art she stated that the spot was ideal for her because it was "far away from New York City but not that far." In 1965 she left her teaching position to move to New Jersey, ultimately establishing a permanent studio and house in Quakertown in 1975, where she set to work designing and building an innovative kiln that would serve the growing scale of her ambitions for clay. Letters, drawings, and notes from the Takaezu papers at the Smithsonian's Archives of American Art, detail the process. Takaezu enlisted the help of Dick Hay from Indiana State University to build the 270-cubic-foot, two-chamber, cross-draft kiln of industrial grade refractory material, much of it donated. The kiln's capacious bisque and glaze firing chambers and its moveable roof allowed Takaezu to work at a scale rarely attempted. From 1967 to 1992 she taught at the Creative Art Program (later named Visual Arts Program) of Princeton University.

== Career ==
Cobalt Blue (c.1990s), Full Moon (1978), Zeus (2000), Sophia (2002), and Anagama (c.1980s) at the Renwick Gallery in Washington, D.C., in 2022

Seeking to understand more about her heritage, Takaezu planned a visit to Japan in the fall of 1955. In October, with her mother and sister Miriam as companions, she embarked upon a month-long journey to Okinawa Prefecture and other parts of Japan. At the month's end, the two sisters decided to extend their stay into the spring. During that eight-month trip in Japan in 1955, Takaezu studied Zen Buddhism, tea ceremony, and the techniques of traditional Japanese pottery, which influenced her work. In Japan, Takaezu was intent on understanding more fully the ceramic tradition of Japan that validated the medium as an art form. While studying there, she worked with Kaneshige Toyo and visited Shoji Hamada, both influential Japanese potters. Each gave her a warm reception, and she developed a special relationship with Kaneshige, who invited her to work in his studio for a few days. Years later, she returned the courtesy by inviting him to Cleveland to do a workshop while she was on the faculty there. Takaezu's observations and experiences during eight months of travel in Japan confirmed her roots in tradition and planted the seeds for a new philosophical base upon which she built her life as an artist and teacher. Through her travels in Japan, including residence in a Zen monastery, she strengthened her original cultural receptivity to the spirit of natural materials. To her, and in a Buddhist animistic fashion, she recounted, "Clay is a sentient being, alive, animate, and responsive," a material entity that "has much to say."

Takaezu's practice, especially following her time in Japan, has been lauded for its reach back to traditional forms and techniques, as well as to the social context of the Japanese mingei, or "arts of the people," movement. The mingei movement, which had developed during the 1920s and 1930s, honored the beauty in everyday and utilitarian objects made by unknown craftsmen. Takaezu and others, such as friend and fellow American artist Peter Voulkos (1924–2002), embraced this aesthetic sensibility and incorporated it into contemporary American ceramics. Takaezu's friendship with the weaver Lenore Tawney was a major influence on both their lives. At one time, they shared a studio at Toshiko's home in New Jersey and often traveled together.

Returning from Japan, Takaezu joined the faculty of the Cleveland Institute of Art, where she taught for ten years until 1965. During this period she experimented with functional ceramics and her transformative closed forms. Having established a studio in Clifton, New Jersey, she began teaching ceramics in 1967 in the Program in Visual Arts at Princeton University until 1992. For her many contributions to the arts as well as her dedication as a teacher, Princeton University awarded Takaezu the Behrman Award for Distinguished Achievement in the Humanities in 1992, and an honorary doctorate of humane letters in 1996. At the time of the exhibition The Poetry of Clay: The Art of Toshiko Takaezu at the Philadelphia Museum of Art in 2004, she returned to Princeton as a Belknap Visitor in the Humanities to speak about her life and career. She taught at several other universities and art schools: Cranbrook Academy of Art, Bloomfield Hills, Michigan; University of Wisconsin, Madison, Wisconsin; Honolulu Academy of Art, Honolulu, Hawaii. She retired in 1992 to become a studio artist, living and working in the Quakertown section of Franklin Township, Hunterdon County, New Jersey, about 30 miles northwest of Princeton. In addition to her studio in New Jersey, she made many of her larger sculptures at Skidmore College in Saratoga Springs, New York.

== Work ==
Takaezu treated life with a sense of wholeness and oneness with nature; everything she did was to improve and discover herself. She believed that ceramics involved self-revelation, once commenting, "In my life I see no difference between making pots, cooking and growing vegetables. They are all so related. However, there is a need for me to work in clay. It is so gratifying and I get so much joy from it, and it gives me many answers in my life." Indeed, she often used her kilns to bake chicken in clay, and to dry mushrooms, apples and zucchinis. As such, Takaezu largely regarded her work with clay as a collaboration between artist and nature.

Takaezu's early works from around the mid-1950s center upon semi-utilitarian teapots, plates, bottle shapes, and double-spouted vases in conventional sand and earth colors. In the late 1950s, she began to develop rich blue, pink, and yellow glazes, colors she continued to employ throughout her career. To achieve the intense colors and rich surfaces, Toshiko embraced the fire as a partner in the creative process, often speaking about the kiln and the firing cycle with reverence. She referred to the firing as something spiritual that adds an unpredictable element and outcome to each work. Influenced by Japanese and Scandinavian designs, her early works are frequently brushed with calligraphic markings and stylized floral motifs. Takaezu's multi-spouted vessels, produced largely in 1953, brought her early awards and attention. In January 1955, one of her two-necked freeform bottles was first noted in the then-two-year-old Ceramics Monthly magazine. Then in the late 1950s, strongly influenced by the Finnish ceramist Maija Grotell, she embraced the notion of ceramic pieces as artworks meant to be seen rather than used. Takaezu's signature clay forms are carefully thrown on a wheel, built by joining coils or slabs, or shaped by hand modeling, and decorated by brushing, spraying, or dripping glazes onto the surface. When she developed her signature "closed form" after sealing her pots, she found her identity as an artist. The ceramic forms resembled human hearts and torsos, closed cylindrical forms, and huge spheres she called "moons." By engaging a strategy of containment in her closed columns and ovoid forms, she harnessed negative space in an encompassing manner. Before closing her forms, and leaving only a pinhole to allow heated gas to escape during firing, she would insert a piece of clay wrapped in paper into the vessel's interior. During the firing process, the paper burns away and the clay nugget hardens, becoming a rattle inside each form. Researcher and writer Ruiko Kato remarked that the "Zen concepts to simplify to absolute minimum and perceive intuitively" are realized in her closed forms and that their non-functionality renders them as "spiritual forms… arrived at after removing unnecessary parts one by one." Strongly influenced by her study of Zen Buddhism, she regarded her ceramic work as an outgrowth of nature and seamlessly interconnected with the rest of her life.

In the early 1970s, when Takaezu didn't have access to a kiln, she painted on canvas. She was once asked by Chōbyō Yara what the most important part of her ceramic pieces is. She replied that, it is the hollow space of air within, because it cannot be seen but is still part of the pot. She relates this to the idea that what's inside a person is the most important. Takaezu also became known for the squat balls she called moon pots, and the vertical ''closed forms,'' which grew sharply in height in the 1990s. At times, Takaezu exhibited the moon pots in hammocks, an allusion to her method of drying the pots in nets. She also cast bronze bells and wove rugs. That Takaezu also works in bronze is not surprising, as bronze casting is essentially a ceramic art form, and both depend on the element of fire. A positive form is first modeled in clay, sometimes with high-relief ribs and dripped glazes to create a richly textured surface. Molds are then made in which to cast the bronze. Many of Takaezu's bronzes are related in form to her ceramics, but there are departures—she explores structural characteristics that could not be fabricated in clay. In some ways, the open-bottomed bells, with their useful sound-generating emptiness, can be likened to her closed-form ceramics with interior rattles. The bronze bells resonate in a rich sonorous tone suitable for remembrance and commemoration. Whereas her hidden rattles anticipate private discovery, the open bells are meant to be sounded with public participation. In 2003 a bronze bell cast, dated, and inscribed in 2000 by Takaezu was erected in a memorial garden on the west side of Princeton University's East Pyne Hall. The bell, garden, and thirteen metal stars set in a circular formation on the ground memorialize the thirteen Princeton University alumni who lost their lives in the terrorist attacks of September 11, 2001.

In the 1970s, Takaezu began a series of tall forms that she called "Tree Forms," thin ceramic trunks inspired by the scorched trees she had seen throughout her career along the Devastation Trail in Hawaii's Volcanoes National Park. Making yearly visits to the islands as an adult, the tropical landscape played a significant role in her work throughout her life. A group of extended cylinders, called Growth (1973), reflects her strong relationship with nature. Inspired by a surrealistic landscape of burned trees silhouetted against the volcanic surface of her homeland, she created Lava Forest (Homage to the Devastation Forest). In the late 1970s she made Homage to Tetragonoloblus, a tribute to the tropical legume plant that is being promoted as a reliable food source in areas of the world challenged by regular food shortages. Originally produced in clay, the forms were later developed as a series in bronze.

Takaezu was known to not date her work, often noting only the decade in which they were made, as a practice that intended that the pieces were experienced in terms of the artist's evolution rather than in a carefully laid out chronology. Certain writers have also linked her abstracted forms and expressive technical skills to the likes of Jackson Pollock or Franz Kline, arguing for her recognition as an Abstract Expressionist.

Shiro Momo (White Peach), porcelain, Toshiko Takaezu (1992) Hawaii State Art Museum

Garden Piece, stoneware, Toshiko Takaezu, (1973) Hawaii State Art Museum

Moon, stoneware, Toshiko Takaezu (1980s), Honolulu Museum of Art

Ceramic Forest - Three Trees, stoneware, Toshiko Takaezu (1975–1980), Honolulu Museum of Art

== Death and legacy ==
Having had a long relationship with the state of New Jersey, in 2007 Takaezu donated 29 significant pieces to the State Museum of New Jersey. Much of this gift was shown in a major 2008 exhibition, Transcendent: Toshiko Takaezu in the State Museum Collection. Featuring 40 of her works, a number of which were from her donation to the state, the show represented a significant portion of the more than 50 works by Takaezu in the museum's collection.

Takaezu died on March 9, 2011, in Honolulu, following a stroke she suffered in May 2010. Since then, several major exhibitions have memorialized her legacy, including the University of Florida's Samuel P. Harn Museum of Art with its 2011 exhibition Toshiko Takaezu: Expressions in Clay. The Toshiko Takaezu Foundation was established in 2015 to support and promote her legacy, and with the foundation's support, major retrospectives organized by the Museum of Fine Arts Boston and The Noguchi Museum are being held in 2023-24 and 2024-26 respectively.

== Exhibitions ==
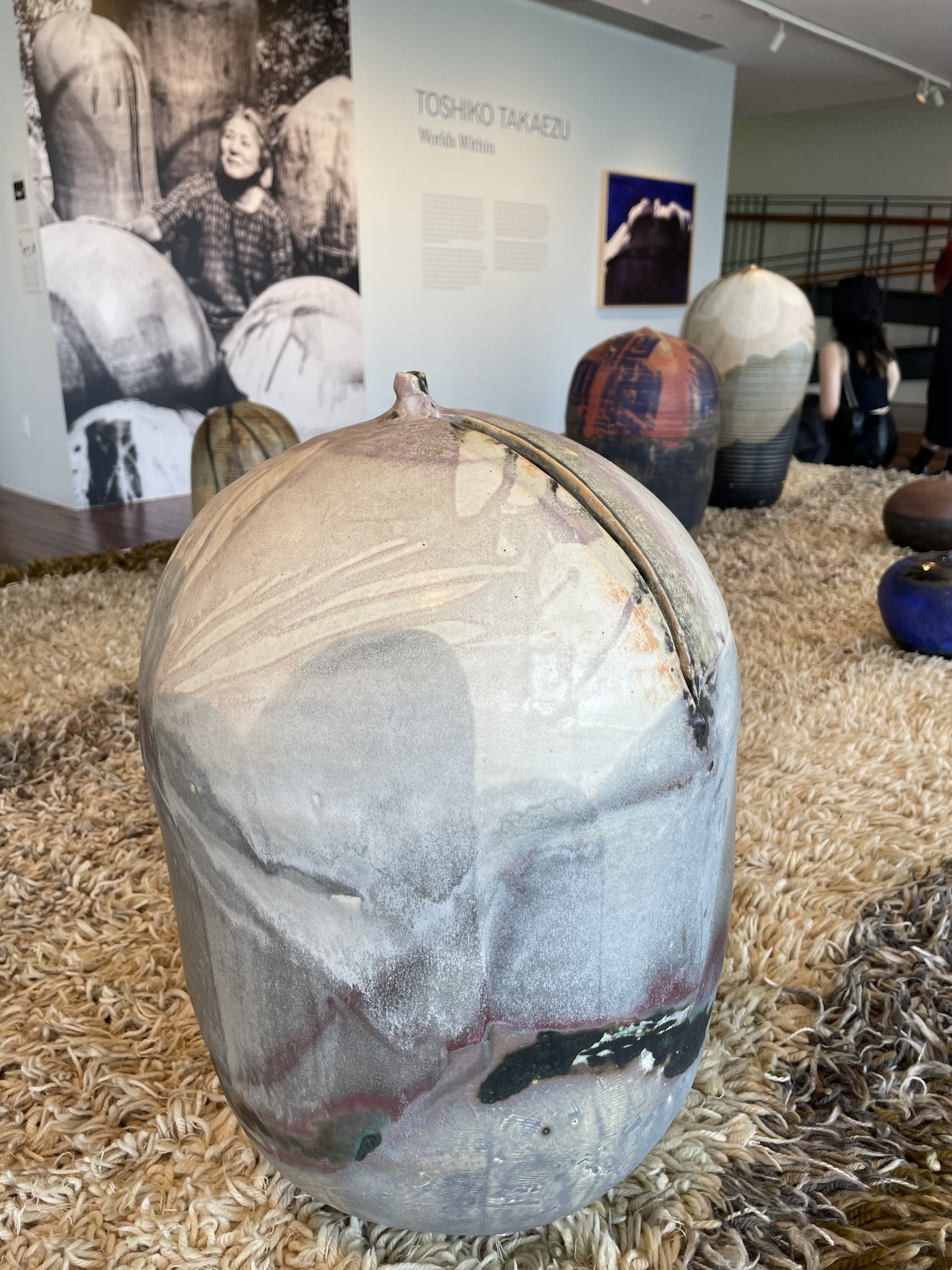
Takaezu solo exhibition at the Noguchi Museum in Spring 2024

- 1995: National Museum of Modern Art, Kyoto, Japan
- 2006: Hunterdon Art Museum, Clinton, New Jersey
- 2020: ASU Ceramics Museum, Brickyard, Tempe Arizona
- 2022: Venice Biennale
- 2023: Museum of Fine Arts, Boston
- 2024: The Noguchi Museum (and other venues)
- 2025-26: Princeton University Art Museum

She has also been in several group exhibitions throughout the United States and internationally in countries including Belgium, Czechoslovakia, Japan, and Switzerland. Her work was included in the 2024 exhibition Making Their Mark: Works from the Shah Garg Collection at the Berkeley Art Museum and Pacific Film Archive (BAMPFA).

== Honors and awards ==
Takaezu won many honors and awards for her work:

- 1964: Tiffany Foundation grant
- 1980: National Endowment for the Arts fellowship
- 1983: Dickinson College Arts Award
- 1987: Living Treasure Award (Honolulu, HI)
- 2010: Konjuhosho Award, conferred by the Emperor of Japan to individuals who have made significant contributions to Japanese society (Naha City, Okinawa, Japan)

== Collections ==
Takaezu's work may be found in private and corporate permanent collections, as well as several public collections across the United States:

- Allentown Art Museum, Allentown, Pennsylvania
- Arizona State University, Tempe, Arizona
- Canton Museum of Art, Canton, Ohio
- Cantor Arts Center, Stanford, California
- Carnegie Museum of Art, Pittsburgh, Pennsylvania
- Cleveland Museum of Art, Cleveland, Ohio
- Currier Museum of Art, Manchester, New Hampshire
- Detroit Institute of Arts, Detroit, Michigan
- Everson Museum of Art, Syracuse, New York
- Fine Arts Museums of San Francisco, San Francisco, California
- Frances Young Tang Teaching Museum and Art Gallery, Skidmore College, Saratoga Springs, New York
- Harn Museum of Art, Gainesville, Florida
- Hunter Museum of American Art, Chattanooga, Tennessee
- Hunterdon Art Museum, Clinton, New Jersey
- Grounds for Sculpture, Hamilton, New Jersey
- High Museum of Art, Atlanta, Georgia
- Los Angeles County Museum of Art, Los Angeles, California
- Metropolitan Museum of Art, New York, New York
- Milwaukee Art Museum, Milwaukee, Wisconsin
- Museum of Arts and Design, New York, New York
- Museum of Fine Arts, Boston, Massachusetts
- Philadelphia Museum of Art, Philadelphia, Pennsylvania
- Princeton University Art Museum, Princeton, New Jersey
- Racine Art Museum, Racine, Wisconsin
- Seattle Art Museum, Seattle, Washington
- Smithsonian American Art Museum, Washington, D.C.
- Toledo Museum of Art, Toledo, Ohio
- University of Michigan Museum of Art, Ann Arbor, Michigan
