= Maija Grotell =

American ceramic artist (1899–1973)

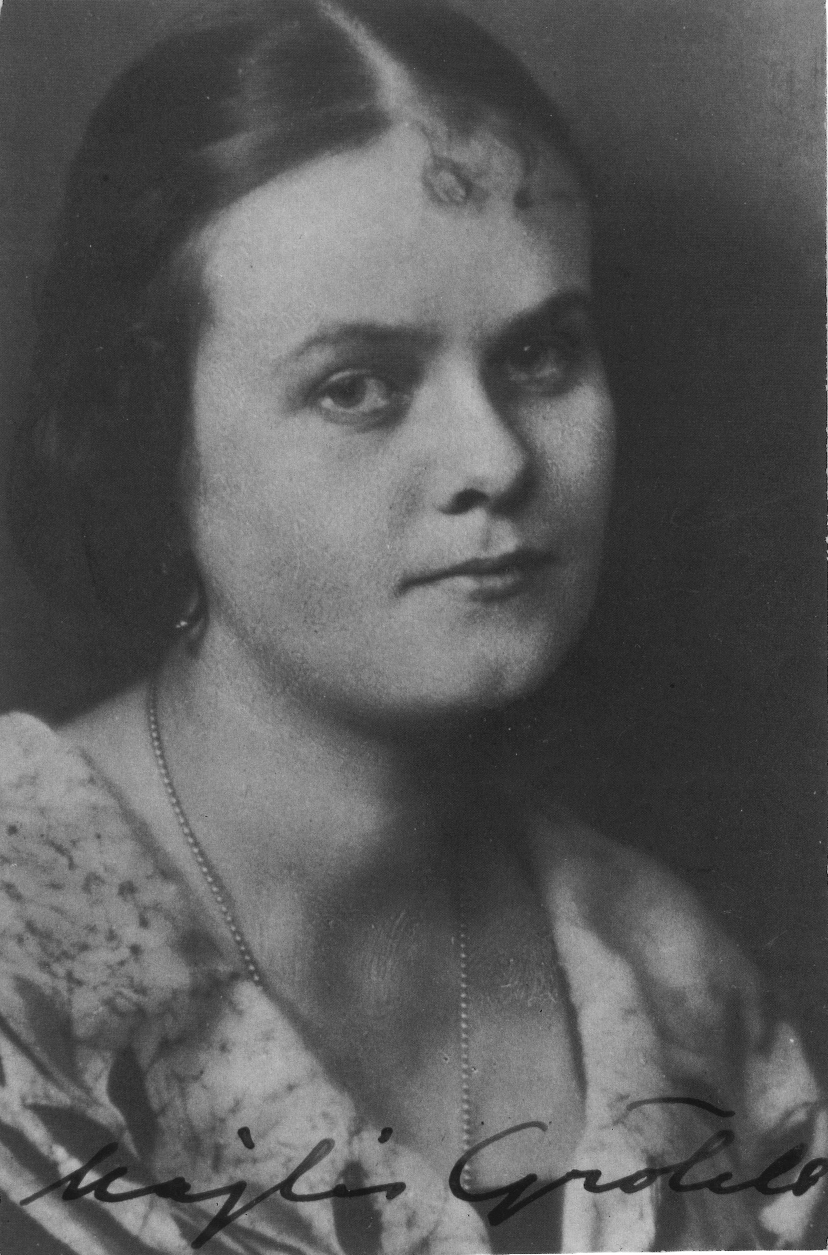
- Born: August 19, 1899; Helsinki, Finland
- Died: December 6, 1973 (aged 74); Pontiac, Michigan, United States
- Citizenship: Finland; United States
- Education: University of Art and Design Helsinki
- Known for: Ceramics
- Awards: Diploma di Colabrador, Barcelona International Exhibition (1929); Silver Medal, Paris International Exhibition (1937); Excellence in Teaching Award, the National Council on Education for the Ceramic Arts (1999 posthumously)

Maija (Majlis) Grotell (August 19, 1899 – December 6, 1973) was an influential Finnish-American ceramic artist and educator. She is often described as the "Mother of American Ceramics."

== Early life and education ==
=== Finland ===
Maija Grotell was born in Helsinki, Finland. She completed six years of graduate work at the University of Art and Design Helsinki housed in the Ateneum. Grotell supported herself during her graduate career by working as a textile designer and working for the Finnish National Museum. Unable to find work after graduation, Grotell left Finland for New York in 1927. She choose the United States because it was less regulated and offered more opportunities for ceramists and women. Grotell later recalled that "after three days in New York, just with the phone, I had a job."

=== United States ===
During her first summer in the United States, Maija Grotell travelled to Alfred University to work with Charles Fergus Binns. She clashed with Binns on his teaching methodology, preferring the potter's wheel to Binns's constructive method. Wheel thrown ceramics were not common in the United States at the time; American potters commonly used coiling, slip casting, or slab building. Grotell, and other European émigrés like Gertrude and Otto Natzler and Marguerite Wildenhain, were largely responsible for bringing European wheel thrown techniques to the United States. Her skill with the potter's wheel proved beneficial for Grotell; she was often asked to demonstrate the technique and could easily find work teaching throughout New York City. In 1934, she received U.S. citizenship. In 1938, Grotell took a position as the head of the ceramics program at Cranbrook Academy of Art in Bloomfield Hills, Michigan. Grotell was hesitant to take the position at Cranbrook. She had initially been declined for the post because the school preferred a male instructor. When the position was offered to her the following year, Grotell feared she could lose her independence as a single woman and credit for her success would be attributed to her male colleagues.

==== Cranbrook Academy of Art ====
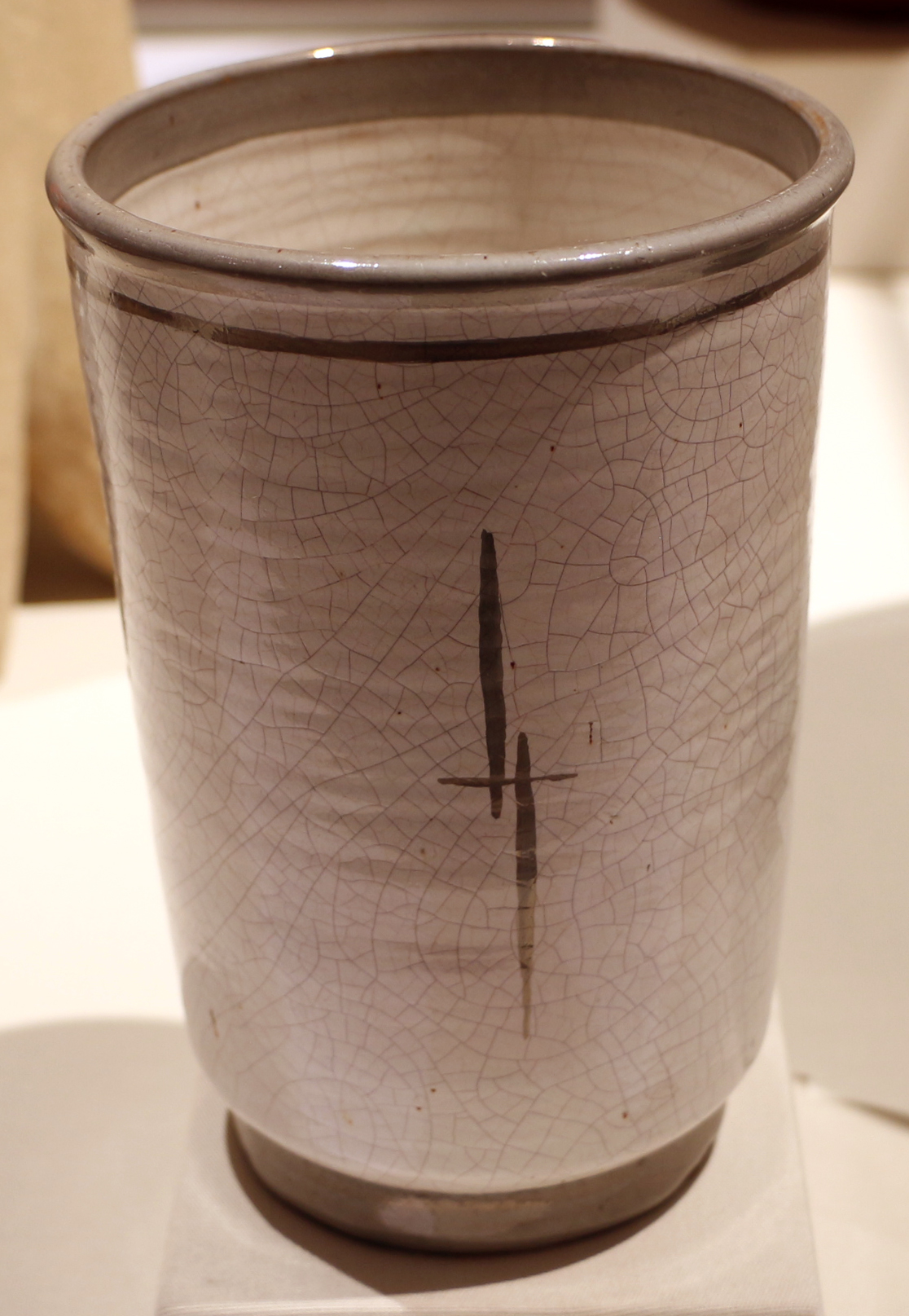
Vase, 1935.

At Cranbrook, Grotell worked primarily with high-fire glazes and stoneware clay bodies. Over her three-decade career, she was an avid experimenter; investigating a variety of glaze chemistries, kilns, and clay bodies. Her glaze formulas remain an important part of her legacy—influencing generations of students and paving the way for the use of ceramics in architecture after her colleague Eero Saarinen used her glazes for the exterior of the General Motors Technical Center.

As an educator, Grotell was an innovative and dedicated instructor. She discouraged imitation and promoted her students to develop their individual aesthetic. Grotell was known to work all night at the studio on her own ceramics after teaching, quickly returning home to change cloths and then return to the studio before anyone arrived. Her dedicated work ethic eventually took its toll; in the early 1960s she developed a muscle condition that limited her ability to throw, which impacted her creative production. By the time she retired from Cranbrook in 1966, she had developed the ceramics department into one of the most prominent in the United States. She was responsible for training many leading ceramists, including Marie Woo, Jan Sultz, Richard De Vore, John Parker Glick, Howard Kottler, Suzanne Stephenson and John Stephenson, Toshiko Takaezu, and Jeff Schlanger.

==== Awards and creative work ====
Though Maija Grotell faced significant barriers due to being a single woman, she proved to be very successful. In 1929 she received the Diploma di Colabrador at the Barcelona International Exhibition. In 1936 she was the first woman to win a prize in the Ceramic National and in 1938 was named a master craftsman by the Boston Society of the Arts and Crafts. In 1937, she received the silver medal at the Paris International Exhibition. Her work was shown nationally at a time when ceramics were not often exhibited. She continued to participate in the Ceramic National every year between 1933 and 1960. Today her work can be found in many prominent museums' collections, including the Metropolitan Museum of Art, the Smart Museum of Art, the Museum of Art and Design, the Canton Museum of Art, the Brooklyn Museum, the David Owsley Museum of Art, the Los Angeles County Museum of Art, the Detroit Institute of Arts, the Carnegie Museum of Art, the Museum of Fine Arts, Boston, the Cranbrook Art Museum, the University of Michigan Museum of Art, the Yale University Art Gallery, and the Art Institute of Chicago.
