= Victor Spinski =

Polish-American artist (1940–2013)

- Born: October 10, 1940; Poland
- Died: January 21, 2013 (aged 72); Newark, Delaware, United States
- Education: Kansas State Teachers College (B.S.E.) Indiana University Bloomington (MFA)
- Occupations: Sculptor; Ceramacist

Victor Spinski (October 10, 1940 – January 21, 2013) was an American artist and professor best known for his ceramic works in the trompe l'oeil (French for "fool the eye") style.

== Education and career ==
Spinski earned a B.S.E. in Art and Foreign Languages from Kansas State Teachers College in Emporia, Kansas in 1963. After graduation, Spinski enlisted in the United States Marine Corps and served in Vietnam as an ordinance expert. In Vietnam, Spinski sustained a serious combat injury that led to months of rehabilitation. Following his discharge from the Marines, Spinski enrolled in graduate school at Indiana University Bloomington, where he studied ceramics under well-known functional potter Karl Martz and received an M.F.A. degree with minors in Jewelry and Photography in 1967. He subsequently taught as Professor of Ceramics at the University of Delaware in Newark for 38 years before retiring in 2006.

Spinski first came to national prominence when he was featured in the landmark 1971 exhibition Clayworks: 20 Americans at the Museum of Contemporary Crafts (now the Museum of Arts and Design) in New York City. Clayworks established Spinski as a peer of other ceramic innovators featured in the exhibition, which included Robert Arneson, Patti Warashina, Jack Earl, David Gilhooly, Marilyn Levine, Richard Shaw, and Clayton Bailey. Bailey, in particular, became a lifelong friend and collaborator. Initially, Spinski's work centered around the creation of imagined machines and technical equipment that were created in sections on the potter's wheel, then assembled into sculptures that could measure in excess of four feet in height.

Along with ceramic artists like Marilyn Levine, Raymon Elozua, Sylvia Hyman, David Furman, and Richard Shaw, Spinski helped to shape a trompe l'oeil (French for "fool the eye") movement in ceramics. In painting, efforts to fool the audience into thinking they were viewing three-dimensional objects date back to the ancient Greeks, where an oft-told story involving a contest between painters Zeuxis and Parrhasius was won when Parrhasius painted a curtain on his canvas so realistic that it fooled his rival into thinking it was real. Spinski began creating sculptural still life compositions out of slip cast ceramic. Like most of his contemporaries, Spinski eschewed the use of paint, and chose instead to use only ceramic glazes, lusters, and china paint, which are more durable, but much more difficult to control.

From the beginning, Spinski chose objects that reflected his blue collar upbringing. His early trompe l'oiel sculptures contain lipstick-imprinted diner mugs and other common household objects. Spinski was pleased with the juxtaposition of his everyday subjects and the amount of attention and care that it took to bring them to life. This dichotomy became even more pronounced in the early 1980s when Spinski began to create sculptures of actual garbage. A 1981 piece, now in the collection of the MFA Houston entitled Still Life with Banana shows an utterly convincing half-peeled banana on a cutting board complete with a silver lustered knife. Another 1981 piece in the MFA Houston's collection shows a cardboard Jack Daniel's box. In contrast to Andy Warhol's vibrant Brillo Boxes, Spinski's weathered cardboard box appears creased and stained.

Starting in the late 1970s, Spinski made a series of fountains that became more elaborate over time. The series culminated in a life-sized depiction of a Volkswagen Beetle crashing through a brick wall. The VW Fountain was exhibited and sold in 1982 at the Theo Portnoy Gallery in New York City. Spinski also exhibited extensively with the Elaine Horwitch Galleries and Loved Fine Art. Spinski's work also traveled extensively from 1978 through 1982 in the exhibition A Century of Ceramics in the United States, curated by Garth Clark and Margie Hughto for the Everson Museum of Art. In 1980, Spinski's series of trompe l'oeil ceramic garbage cans were singled out by critic Edward Lucie-Smith in his book Art in the Seventies. Lucie-Smith wrote that

Here the illusionist paradox acquires a cutting edge. Here are dustbins which do not smell, and which do not soil the hand one plunges into them. The sense of sight is irreconcilably at war with the sense of smell and that of touch.

— Edward Lucie-Smith, Art in the Seventies, Art in the Seventies

Throughout the rest of his career, Spinski focused on his Trompe l'oeil work. He continued to mix wry visual humor—such as a 1995 sculpture entitled Misdirected Forward Pass in the Museum of Fine Arts, Houston that depicts a wayward football that has landed in a bowl of roasted peanuts, with more subtle compositions made up of trompe l'oeil rusted tools and cardboard.

== Death ==
Spinski died on January 21, 2013, after suffering a stroke.

== Museum collections ==
American Museum of Ceramic Art, Pomona, California

Canton Museum of Art, Canton, Ohio

Cooper-Hewitt Smithsonian Design Museum, New York, New York

Crocker Art Museum, Sacramento, California

Delaware Art Museum, Wilmington, Delaware

Detroit Institute of Arts, Detroit, Michigan

Everson Museum of Art, Syracuse, New York

Fuller Craft Museum, Brockton, Massachusetts

Gardiner Museum, Toronto, California

Mint Museum, Charlotte, North Carolina

Museum of Arts and Design, New York, New York

Racine Art Museum, Racine, Wisconsin

Museum of Fine Arts, Houston, Texas

Victoria and Albert Museum, London, UK

== Selected solo exhibitions ==
1969: Victor Spinski, The Parrish Art Museum, Southampton, New York

1972: Victor Spinski, Tyler School of Art Gallery at Temple University, Philadelphia, Pennsylvania

== Selected group exhibitions ==
1968: 25th Ceramic National Exhibition, Everson Museum of Art, Syracuse, New York

1971: Clayworks: 20 Americans, The Museum of Contemporary Crafts, New York, New York

1973: The Plastic Earth, John Michael Kohler Arts Center, Sheboygan, Wisconsin

1976: Soup Tureens, The Campbell Museum, Camden, New Jersey

1979: A Century of Ceramics in the United States, Everson Museum of Art, Syracuse, New York
