= Axel Sanson =

French artist

- Born: 1975 (age 50–51)
- Known for: Painting

Axel Sanson is a French artist.

== Biography ==
Axel Sanson was born in Paris in 1975. He graduated university in 1998 with a degree in social law. He moved on to study history of art and in 2002 he wrote a thesis about French orientalist painter Henri Regnault. He taught himself how to paint, and decided in 2004, when nearing thirty, to dedicate himself fully to image creation.

Axel Sanson is known mostly for his paintings. His works are generally sizable square formats conceived as variations on a theme. The images are often borrowed from photographs or cinema stills, and the way he reinterprets them shows an acute sense of storytelling. In his works, scales collide, space and temporality are fluctuating and sometimes contradictory. The poetry of his works comes from such contrasts.

Drawn to historical subjects, Axel Sanson worked with Art historian Jerôme Delaplanche - now director of the History of Art department at the Villa Medicis - on the book Peindre la guerre (Painting the War). His passion for history makes his practice as a painter essentially reflexive.

In his works he has paid tribute to actresses Bulle Ogier, Silvana Mangano and Dorothy Stratten among others.

In 2018, he is selected for an art project and paints two in-situ frescoes in the car park of the Royal Hamilius, in Luxembourg city, a building designed by renowned architect Sir Norman Foster. Other artists participated in the project, namely : Dorothée Louise Recker, Kosta Kulundzic, Valentina Canseco, Gaëtan Henrioux and Lise Stoufflet.

== Exhibitions ==
=== Solo shows ===
- 2018 : Eden, Thomas Punzmann contemporary, Frankfurt.
- 2017 :
  - Ghosts, Thomas Punzmann contemporary, Frankfurt
  - La Résurrection de la chair, etc., House 17, Luxembourg.
- 2016 : Bikini drone test, Thomas Punzmann contemporary, Frankfurt
- 2015 :
  - Una persistente fortuna, Espace Léon, Paris.
  - Le soleil est aveugle, parcours Nuit Blanche, Valérie Delaunay gallery, Paris.
- 2014 : Mad Minute, Thomas Punzmann fine arts, Frankfurt.
- 2013 : Raspoutitsa, Thomas Punzmann fine arts, Frankfurt.
- 2012 : So feucking french, Thomas Punzmann fine arts, Frankfurt.
- 2011 : Narrenschiff (La Nef des fous), Thomas Punzmann fine arts, Frankfurt.
- 2010 :
  - Storytelling, Françoise Besson gallery, Lyon.
  - Un homme est mort, Anne Perré gallery, Rouen.
- 2009 :
  - Coup de grâce, Issue gallery, Paris.
  - Fire and forget, Art room 03, Françoise Besson gallery, Thônes.
- 2008 :
  - Use of a fake I.D. is a crime, Issue gallery, Paris.
- 2007 :
  - Human decision required, end of residence show, Montrouge.
  - Arrêt au stand, Frédéric Ozier gallery, Saint-Ouen.

=== Group shows ===
- 2018 : Action ! La Nouvelle Ecole française, Bastille Design Center, Paris.
- 2017 : I stare at you, you stare at me, So french, Paris.
- 2015 : Rémanence, Bertrand Gillig gallery, Strasbourg.
- 2014 : Pas si love, Bertrand Gillig gallery, Strasbourg.
- 2013 : Zwischenzeit, Filser & Gräf gallery, Munich.
- 2012 :
  - Songe d’une nuit d’été, galerie Bertrand Gillig, Strasbourg.
  - Songe d’une nuit d’été II, Forum, Saint-Louis.
- 2011 :
  - Art Format Berlin, Thomas Punzmann fine arts.
  - Art Fair Cologne, Thomas Punzmann fine arts.
  - Drawing Now Art Fair, Françoise Besson, Carrousel du Louvre, Paris.
- 2010 :
  - Opening, Thomas Punzmann fine arts, Frankfurt.
  - Regarding painting, Galerie Kevin Kavanagh, Dublin.
  - Portraits, Galerie Jeune Création, Paris.
  - Scope Basel, galerie Françoise Besson, Bâle.
  - Salon du dessin contemporain, galerie Françoise Besson, Carrousel du Louvre, Paris.
  - Chic dessin, Atelier Richelieu, Paris.
- 2009 :
  - Slick 09 art fair, Centquatre, Paris.
  - Slick dessin 09 art fair, Atelier Richelieu, Paris.
- 2008 :
  - SOFF, So feucking french, The Village underground, London.
  - Les gars d’Alain, galerie Catherine et André Hug, Paris.
  - Imageries, galerie Pierrick Touchefeu, Sceaux.
  - Salon d’art contemporain de Montrouge.
- 2007 :
  - Jeune Création Européenne, biennale contemporaine itinérante de Montrouge.
  - Salon d’art contemporain de Montrouge.
