= Marie Woo =

American ceramicist (1928–2026)

- Born: April 3, 1928; Seattle, Washington, U.S.
- Died: February 4, 2026 (aged 97)
- Education: University of Washington (BFA); Cranbrook Academy of Art
- Occupation: Ceramicist
- Spouse: Harvey Levine
- Children: 2

Marie Woo (April 3, 1928 – February 4, 2026) was a Chinese-American ceramicist and educator.

== Career ==
=== Early years ===
Woo was born in Seattle, Washington to Southern Chinese parents. She obtained her Bachelor's degree in fine art from the University of Washington in 1954, and in 1956, her Master's from Cranbrook Academy of Art. It was there that she became proficient in the clay medium, in part by studying under Maija Grotell, a Finnish ceramicist considered the "Mother of American Ceramics."

=== Research in Asia ===
Following what she called a "transformative" graduate program, Woo spent part of the 1960s in Southeast Asia; this would mark the beginning of a lifetime commitment to the traditions of Asian ceramics. Her postgraduate tenure was spent primarily in and around Bizen, Japan. Here she studied ancient methods of working in clay, including the local tradition of unglazed pottery.

Woo's interests in folk pottery were reignited in 1995 after a visit to Beijing, China. According to Woo, she was alarmed by how rapidly modernization was eclipsing interest in traditional ceramic practices. After receiving a grant from the Rockefeller Foundation in 1998, Woo was given license to explore the endangered ceramic traditions of China. She spent this time exploring kiln sites in remote villages, amassing a collection of folk pieces based in the tradition of unfired clay.

=== Later career ===
Woo's extensive research in China culminated in her 2013 exhibition, "Chinese Folk Pottery: Art of the Everyday." Hosted by the University of Michigan Museum of Art, the collection continued to be shown for six years after it left the museum in Ann Arbor.

In early 2020, Woo was awarded the Kresge Eminent Artist prize, an honor worth $50,000. In doing so, she was the first ceramicist to win since the award was established in 2008.

== Themes ==
Considered a "potter's potter," Woo's work is notable for its technical imperfection and its interplay between form and function. In deference to Woo's 2016 retrospective, Clay Odyssey, art critic Sarah Rose Sharp stated, "There is great intentionality in the way that Woo has slashed and broken her forms – even those resembling traditional vessels have scarred-over cuts along their exterior surfaces, strategic tears and gouges, or oddly pinched handles on the lids of pots.” Speaking on her work, Woo says, "There is a permanence of ideas and forms when clay is frozen by fire. But unfired clay forms, when exposed to the natural elements, become slowly transformed, reclaimed and absorbed back to the earth, a metaphor for life. Ideas and built forms are erased and no longer recognizable."

Two glazes the artist worked with and refined throughout her career, her signature "Woo Yellow" and "Woo Blue," are replicated by ceramicists internationally.

== Personal life and death ==
Woo was married to architect Harvey Levine, whom she met while at Cranbrook. Together they have a son, Ian, a corporate pilot, and a daughter, Leslie Raymond, who is the director of the Ann Arbor Film Festival.

Woo died in February 2026, at the age of 97.

== Awards ==
- Kresge Eminent Artist Award, 2020
- Lifetime Artist Achievement Award, Michigan Ceramic Arts Association, 2019
- Gold Medal Award, Detroit Scarab Club, 2017
- Asian Cultural Council Research Grant, Asian Cultural Council, Rockefeller Fund, 1998
- Syracuse National Ceramic Exhibition Purchase Award, 1956

== Exhibitions ==
- Marie Woo: Clay Quest, The Scarab Club, Detroit, MI, 2020
- Clay Odyssey: A Retrospective, Birmingham Bloomfield Art Center, Birmingham, MI, 2016
- Michigan Masters Invitational, Kresge Art Museum, Michigan State University, East Lansing, MI, 2009

== Collections ==
- Detroit Institute of Arts, Detroit, MI
- Everson Museum of Art, Syracuse, NY
- Mills College Art Museum, Oakland, CA
