= John Glick =

American ceramicist (1938–2017)

- John Glick in 2014
- Born: John Parker Glick; July 1, 1938; Detroit, Michigan, U.S.
- Died: April 6, 2017 (aged 78); Walnut Creek, California, U.S.
- Education: Wayne State University, Cranbrook Academy of Art
- Movement: abstract expressionism
- Spouse: Susie Symons

John Parker Glick (1 July 1938 – 6 April 2017) was an American ceramicist. Though open to artistic experimentation, Glick was most influenced by the styles and aesthetics of Asian pottery—an inspiration that shows in his use of decorative patterns and glaze choices. His experience working with ceramics led him to publish several articles about the craft. In addition to producing pottery, Glick began making "landscape oriented" wall panels during the latter part of his career. Known as "the people's potter," he is primarily remembered for his contributions to art and the field of ceramics.

Glick operated his studio, Plum Tree Pottery, in Farmington Hills, Michigan, from 1964 to 2016.

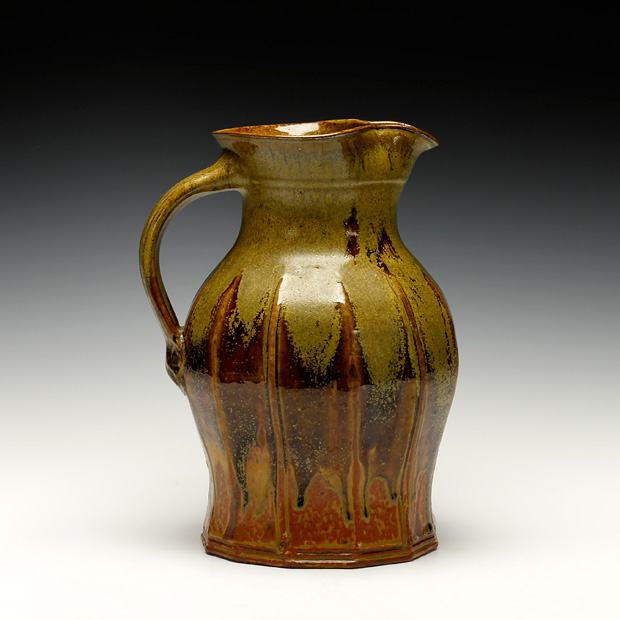
Pouring Pitcher by John Glick at the Schaller Gallery

== Education and career ==
John Glick was born on 1 July 1938 in Detroit, Michigan. The child of two parents with an affinity for art, Glick began his life surrounded by creativity. His father, a grocery store manager, had an interest in gardening and painting; his mother, a homemaker, enjoyed cooking, sewing, and crafts. From a young age, Glick was included in his parents' projects, and he began formally studying art himself in high school.

As a student at Wayne State University, Glick studied geology for one semester, but quickly decided to major in both ceramics and metalwork instead. He earned his BFA degree in 1960. Studying under ceramicist Maija Grotell at Cranbrook Academy of Art, he received his MFA in 1962. After graduation, Glick was drafted and served in the United States Army until 1964. During that time, he was stationed in West Germany, in a town home to many salt-glazing potteries. Inspired by conversations with these potters, Glick strengthened his resolve to one day work full-time as a potter in his own studio.

Upon returning home to Michigan from the military in 1964, Glick founded his studio, Plum Tree Pottery. Over the course of his career, Glick, encouraged by an art collector he had met, decided to begin a personal collection of his own work. Over 50 years, he saved approximately 1,000 pieces—a large number, but a small fraction of the estimated 300,000 pieces he created in total. Though Glick admitted that saving those works was difficult "because they should have been out in the world," he was then able to use that personal collection as an aid for the 33 apprentices and residents with whom he worked at Plum Tree Pottery. He operated the studio until 2016, when he and his wife, Susie Symons, moved to California to be closer to their family.

One of the most crucial parts of a career so extensive, one that spanned five decades and yielded 300,000 pieces of pottery, was open-mindedness. Glick cited his "love of process" and "the ability to ask questions of [himself]" as two factors which shaped his career. The former led him to personally develop new tools and machinery in order to expand his physical means of creation. For example, he recalled "outgrow[ing]" his manual extruders and consequently designing his own hydraulic extruders to use instead. Similarly, the latter influenced how he conceived of his work in the first place, shaping how he decided what to create and how to create it.

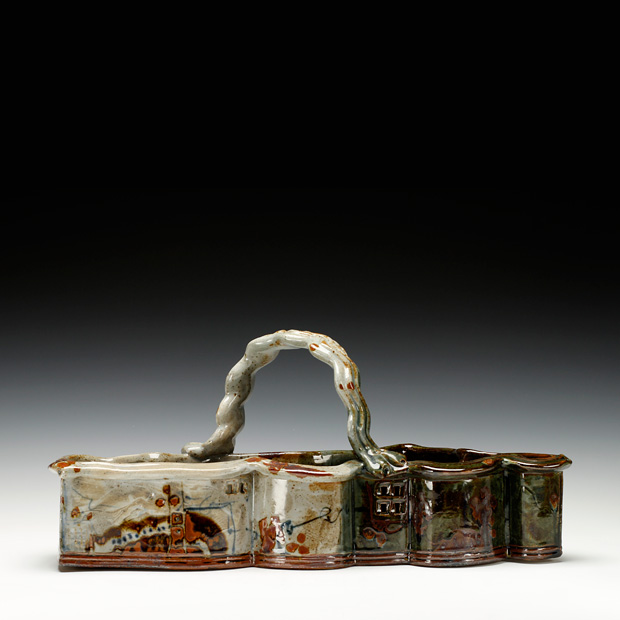
Ceramic Basket by John Glick at the Schaller Gallery

== Awards ==
Glick has received the following awards:

- 2016: Nancy Coumoundouros Distinguished Service to the Arts Award, City of Farmington Hills, Michigan
- 2009: Invited Guest, International Ceramics Studio, Kecskemét, Hungary
- 2001: Governor's Michigan Artist Award, ArtServe Michigan (now Creative Many Michigan)
- 1990: Individual Artist's Grant, Michigan Council for the Arts
- 1988: Fellowship, National Endowment for the Arts
- 1977: Fellowship, National Endowment for the Arts
- 1977: Governor's Award, Michigan Foundation for the Arts
- 1972: Louis Comfort Tiffany Award, Louis Comfort Tiffany Foundation
- 1961: Louis Comfort Tiffany Award, Louis Comfort Tiffany Foundation

== Museum collections ==
Glick is represented in the following museum collections:

- Canton Museum of Art, Canton, Ohio
- Craft and Folk Art Museum, Los Angeles, California
- Cranbrook Art Museum, Bloomfield Hills, Michigan
- The Crocker Art Museum, Sacramento, California
- Delaware Art Museum, Wilmington, Delaware
- The Detroit Institute of Arts, Detroit, Michigan
- Dinnerware Museum, Ann Arbor, Michigan
- The Everson Museum of Art, Syracuse, New York
- The Flint Institute of Arts, Flint, Michigan
- Gardiner Museum, Toronto, Ontario, Canada
- Hunter Museum of American Art, Chattanooga, TN
- Kansas City Art Institute, Kansas City, Missouri
- Krannert Art Museum, Champaign, IL
- Los Angeles County Museum of Art, Los Angeles, California
- The Mint Museum, Charlotte, North Carolina
- Museums of Art and Design, New York, New York
- The Museum of Fine Arts, Houston, Texas
- The Newark Museum, Newark, New Jersey
- Racine Art Museum, Racine, Wisconsin
- Smithsonian American Art Museum, Washington, D.C.
- University of Michigan Museum of Art, Ann Arbor, Michigan
- Yixing Art Museum, Yixing, China

== Selected solo exhibitions ==
Glick's solo exhibitions include:

- 2016-2017: John Glick: A Legacy in Clay, Cranbrook Art Museum, Bloomfield Hills, MI
- 2006: John Glick: Looking Back - Making Now, 42 Years in Clay, Birmingham Bloomfield Art Center, Birmingham, MI
- 1990: A Retrospective Selection Plus Recent Works, Fosdick-Nelson Gallery, School of Art & Design, Alfred University, Alfred, NY
- 1975: Ten Year Retrospective Exhibition: John Glick, Pewabic Pottery, Detroit, MI

== Selected group exhibitions ==
Glick's work has been included in the following group exhibitions:

- 2017: Major Mud 3, The Morean Arts Center, St. Petersburg, Florida
- 2015: Standing on Ceremony: Functional Ware from RAM's Collection, Racine Art Museum, Racine, Wisconsin
- 2014: Magic Mud: Masterworks in Clay from RAM's Collection, Racine Art Museum, Racine, Wisconsin
- 2014: White Gold: The Appeal of Lustre, Racine Art Museum, Racine, Wisconsin
- 2013: Plates & Platters: Salon Style, The Clay Studio, Philadelphia, Pennsylvania
- 2011: Big Creek Pottery: A Social History of a Visual Idea 1967-1983, Santa Cruz Museum of Art and History, Santa Cruz, California
- 2007: Cityscape/Landscape, A Group Exhibition, The Clay Studio, Philadelphia, Pennsylvania
- 2006: 20th Anniversary of Watershed Center for Ceramic Arts: Invitational Exhibition, The Society of Arts and Crafts, Boston, Massachusetts
- 2005: National Teapot Show VI, Cedar Creek Gallery, Creedmoor, North Carolina
- 2004: When Form Meets Function, Ella Sharp Museum, Jackson, Michigan
- 2002: Great Pots: Contemporary Ceramics from Function to Fantasy, Newark Museum of Art, Newark, New Jersey
- 2000: Color and Fire: Defining Moments in Studio Ceramics, 1950-2000, Los Angeles County Museum of Art, Los Angeles, California (and tour)
- 1999: Pacific Tides: The Influence of the Pacific Rim on Contemporary American Ceramics, Lancaster Art Museum, Lancaster, Pennsylvania
- 1995: In Praise of Craft, Renwick Gallery, within Smithsonian American Art Museum, Washington, D.C.
- 1989: Surface and Form, National Museum of Ceramic Art, Baltimore, Maryland
