= Carolyn Brady =

American painter

- Born: May 22, 1937; Chickasha, Oklahoma
- Died: May 5, 2005 (aged 67); Rochester, Minnesota
- Education: University of Oklahoma
- Known for: Painting, Watercolor
- Movement: Photorealism

Carolyn Brady (May 22, 1937 – May 5, 2005) was an American photorealist painter and artist. Her work often consists of hyper-realistic watercolors of flowers and table settings.

== Early works ==
Carolyn Brady studied art at the University of Oklahoma in Norman from 1958 to 1961 before moving to New York where she lived until the end of her life. Her early professional works consisted of large fabric panels of linen appliqué often with a literal component, probably inspired by her first job in New York as a textile designer. Most had vibrant, saturated colors with little or no shading, and used furniture or interior scenes for their subject matter.

== Watercolors ==
Early on, Brady became acquainted with the photorealist Joseph Raffael (she sub-let his apartment in 1962) and later identified him as her largest influence.

In 1972, amply fulfilling a desire to do something more "real", Brady switched from fabric panels to watercolor and was soon producing photo-realistic works of complex color, texture, and intricacy. In her obituary, The New York Times stated, "With their sharp focus, luminous colors and dimensions as great as 60 by 90 inches, her paintings have a hyper-realistic visual impact rarely encountered in the medium of watercolor."

Her works gradually increased in complexity and size. Her largest works (5 feet by 7.5 feet) were meticulously rendered fields of blooming flowers painted to the very edge of the paper. In the 1980s, table place settings, sometimes clean, sometimes with food partly consumed, became a favorite and frequent subject. "Her sensual and psychological appreciation for the elements of her meals takes them out of the category of reportage and into poetry, "

== Exhibitions and collections ==
Brady's works have been exhibited in museums around the world, including the Baltimore Museum of Art (Maryland), the National Museum of American Art (Washington, DC), the Miyagi Museum of Art (Miyagi, Japan), the Orlando Museum of Art (Florida), the Museum of Modern Art (San Francisco), and the National Academy of Design (New York).

Her works are currently in the collections of the Metropolitan Museum of Art (New York), the National Museum of American Art, (Smithsonian Institution, Washington, DC), the Art Institute of Chicago (Illinois), the Saint Louis Art Museum (Missouri), and many others.

In 1991, Brady was elected into the National Academy of Design as an Associate member, and became a full member in 1994.
