= Vuk Vidor =

French-Serbian artist

- Вук Видор
- Born: Vuk Veličković; 1965 (age 60–61); Belgrade, SR Serbia, SFR Yugoslavia
- Education: École des Beaux-Arts
- Known for: Painting, drawing, sculpture, installation
- Notable work: Art History, Serbia Remix, Evils, The Newton Initiative, SuperEgo
- Movement: sub-realism
- Children: 2
- Father: Vladimir Veličković
- Awards: Ito Ham Prize, International Painting Prize of Vitry-sur-Seine
- Website: vukvidor.com/works/

Vuk Vidor (née Veličković; Serbian Cyrillic: Вук Видор, née Величковић; born 1965) is a French-Serbian artist.

== Life ==
Vuk Vidor is the son of the painter, illustrator and engraver Vladimir Veličković and the older brother of artist Marko Velk. Born in Belgrade, Serbia in 1965, he studied architecture at the Ecole Nationale des Beaux Arts de Paris-Tolbiac (Paris-Tolbiac National School of Fine Arts) and graduated in 1990. He shows several of his utopian and conceptual architectural projects alongside pioneers such as Zaha Hadid, Morphosis, Coop Himmelblau, Eric Moss... In 1992, Vuk Vidor decides to turn to painting. A series of drawing he started in 1989 and entitled " King Ink " often serves as the basis for his works.

== Work ==
=== Artistic practice ===
Vidor's work is characterized by its eclecticism. His reflexion about life and death is prominent in a series of paintings entitled " Ascendance " that depicts interconnected skulls. It is a way to represent emotional, historical or even cosmic connexions between beings. His works are full of irony. The " Everlast " series is about the 4 ages of life : childhood, Adulthood, old age and death. He works with several mediums, mostly painting and drawing, but sometimes sculpture or installation as well. In 2000 he contributed to an exhibition about the color red, symbolizing eros, blood and violence.

In 2015, Vuk Vidor created an exhibition around a fictitious industrial and scientist, Thomas Jerome Newton, a character from the 1976 movie The Man Who Fell to Earth. He built a story around the character, pretending that he was about to give an interview to Time Magazine. He feigned to have had access to the character's archives and exhibited documents about him. David Bowie, who impersonates Thomas Jerome Newton in the movie, is omnipresent in the exhibition. Vuk Vidor had previously focused on another icon, the singer and musician Elvis Presley, whose name he had changed to ‘Evils’.

Vuk Vidor has worked with musicians Goran Bregović and Marc Cerrone, and English rock band Duran Duran. He directed numerous music clips in Serbia in the 90s. In 2006, he directed a vido clip about greed for the launch of the Chrysler 300.

=== Committed art ===
Vuk Vidor is a committed and political artist. In 2003 he takes side for the Refugees in an installation called Serbia Remix Project. The subject of the installation is a blue, white, and red striped plastic bag. This bag is according to him, a common feature of every victim of modern conflicts. His work is fraught with historical references and frequently deals with the idea of war. He has built a gold statue of himself in an attempt to reflect both on his ego as an artist. and on Serbian nationalism.

In a 2009 series entitled " American Quartet ", he delivers his own vision of the United States. Through figures of weary Superheroes, he denounces the myth of the Frontier and the omnipotence of the US. Captain American becomes an Atlas-like figure, bearing on his shoulder not the world but the American Dream. Jesus is also part of the exhibition, but is shown crucified to Shareholders. The inspiration of his post 9/11 world comes from pop art and American comics – a genre he likes to parody. He twists American symbols and turns heroes into useless villains. He exhibits his works in the United States to force Americans to face their contradictions. He intends to show that today " even super-heroes cannot save us ". Generally speaking, his work constantly interrogates the place of humanity in the universe.

=== Conception of art ===
Vuk Vidor's vision of art is sometimes controversial. " Vuillard was better than Bonnard, same for Tapiès, Rauschenberg used to be better, Twombly has always painted crap, Bacon was better when he was alive. ", he said in a 1999 manifesto-like work entitled " Art history ". In 2007 he co-signed an editorial in the French newspaper L’Humanité, criticizing how the French Ministry for Culture was contributing to create a normalized and monopolistic " official art ". He spoke against the " masked puppeteers " who are imposing diktats of fashion and trends in the art world. He asked for a fair repartition of temporary exhibition spaces. His work is transgressive : he even directed erotic videos.

In 2012, Vuk Vidor created the under-realist movement with Kosta Kulundzic, a Franco-American artist of Serbian origin, and the French artist Stéphane Pencréac’h. The movement is a reaction against the over-conceptualisation of contemporary painting. For them, the image is more important than the idea. The under-realism is a grouping of artists who share the same vision of the artist's condition and are trying to free themselves from the diktats of market and trends.

== Recognition ==
Vuk Vidor was awarded the Ito Ham Prize in 1986.

He was awarded the International Painting Prize of Vitry-sur-Seine in 1996.

== Exhibitions ==
=== Solo shows ===
- 2013
  - Newton, Poulsen Gallery, Copenhagen
  - Les 7 péchés capitaux, Mazel Gallery, Brussels
- 2009 : Superheroe, Magda Danysz Gallery, Paris
- 2007 : Even Super Heroes Can't Save Us Now, Cueto Project, New York City
- 2006 :
  - If you’re looking for trouble you came to the right place, Valérie Cueto Gallery, Paris
  - The Blood Value of the Banana, Palais de Tokyo, Paris
- 2005
  - If you’re looking for trouble you came to the right place, Art Basel Miami Beach, United States
  - If you’re looking for trouble you came to the right place, ARCO 05, Madrid
- 2004
  - Eldorado, Valérie Cueto Gallery, Paris
  - If you are looking for trouble you came to the right place, CZKD, Belgrade
  - Art history, mural installation, Palais de Tokyo, Paris
- 2003
  - Flesh for Fantasy, Valérie Cueto Gallery, Paris
  - Flesh for Fantasy, Emmanuel Javogue Fine Art, Miami
- 2001 : Serbia Remix, Belgrade
- 1999 :
  - (L)overs, Valérie Cueto Gallery, Paris
  - Last Painting of the Century, Valérie Cueto Gallery, Paris
  - Last Painting of the Century, Picture Show Gallery, Berlin
- 1995
  - Give me back my flag, CZKD, Belgrade
  - Museum of Modern Art, Kragujevac, Yugoslavia
  - Galerie 12 +, Belgrade

=== Group shows ===
- 2018 : Action ! La Nouvelle École française : première époque, Bastille Design Center, Paris
- 2015 : Blackout, Mazel Gallery, Brussels
- 2014
  - St’Art Art Fair, Mazel Gallery, Strasbourg
  - Sur le papier, Mazel Gallery, Brussels
- 2013
  - Drawing Now, Carrousel du Louvre, Paris
  - Under Realism 3, La Lune en parachute, Epinal, France
  - Under Realism v. 4.0, Acentmètresducentredumonde, Perpignan, France
  - SOON, Mazel Galerie, Brussels
- 2012
  - Louise Alexander Gallery, Porto Cervo, Italy
  - Art Paris, Louise Alexander Gallery, Paris
  - Quelques instants plus tard… Art & Bande dessinée, Réfectoire des Cordeliers, Paris
  - The Gallery Poulsen Late Summer Show 2012, Poulsen Gallery, Copenhagen
  - Une histoire vraie. Leopold Rabus & Guests, Aeroplastics Gallery, Brussels
  - Happy Birthday Marilyn… 50 ans déjà, Mazel Gallery, Brussels
  - Under Realism 1, Serbia Cultural Center, Paris
  - Under Realism 2, Progres Gallery, Belgrade
  - Tensions, Mazel Gallery, Brussels
- 2011 : Words and dreams. Where technology meets dreams and vice versa, 18Gallery Shanghai – Bund 18, Shanghai
- 2010
  - Vuk Vidor and Friends, Poulsen Gallery, Copenhagen
  - The Poulsen X-Mas Show 2010, Poulsen Gallery, Copenhagen
  - Speed Painting, Magda Danysz Gallery, Paris
- 2009
  - Vraoum !, Maison Rouge, Paris
  - That's all Folks!, Stadshallen, Bruges, Belgium
  - Elusive Dreams 2, Irish Museum of Contemporary Art, Dublin
- 2008 : Micro-Narratives: Temptation of Small Realities, Saint-Étienne Metropolis Museum of Modern Art, Saint-Étienne, France
- 2007
  - Micro Narratives, 45th October Salon, Belgrade
  - The Theatre of Cruelty, White Box, New York
  - Zeitgeist, Cueto Project, New York
  - Superego, CZKD, Belgrade
  - French Touche, Villa Tamaris, La Seyne-sur-Mer, France
- 2006 : Faites de beaux rêves, Nuit Blanche, Paris
- 2005
  - Artists & Arms, Maars Gallery, Moscow
  - Exposition inaugurale, Marta Herford, Herford, Germany
  - Art Cologne, Cologne, Germany
  - Foire internationale d'art contemporain, Paris
  - Art Brussels, Brussels
  - Cosmopolis, Muséum of Contemporary Art of Thessaloniki, Thessaloniki, Greece
  - My Favorite Things: Peinture en France, Contemporary Art Museum, Lyon
- 2004
  - Comic Release: Negotiating Identity for a New Generation, Regina Gouger Miller Gallery, Carnegie Mellon University, Pittsburgh, United States
  - Comic Release: Negotiating Identity for a New Generation, University of Arizona Museum of Art, Tucson, United States
  - Comic Release: Negotiating Identity for a New Generation, Armory Center for the Arts, Pasadena, United States
  - Comic Release: Negotiating Identity for a New Generation, Art House, Austin, United States
  - Comic Release: Negotiating Identity for a New Generation, Western Washington University, Bellingham, United States
  - Comic Release: Negotiating Identity for a New Generation, Art Brussels, Brussels
  - Comic Release: Negotiating Identity for a New Generation, Foire internationale d'art contemporain, Paris
- 2003
  - Central, Galerie Ernst Hilger, Belgrade
  - Comic Release: Negotiating Identity for a New Generation, The Contemporary Museum, Honolulu, Hawaii, United States
  - Comic Release: Negotiating Identity for a New Generation, The Naples Museum of Art, Naples (Florida), United States
  - Comic Release: Negotiating Identity for a New Generation, Real Area Ways, Hartford, United States
  - Comic Release: Negotiating Identity for a New Generation, Austin Museum of Art, Austin, United States
  - Comic Release: Negotiating Identity for a New Generation, Université Carnegie-Mellon, Pittsburgh, United States
  - Comic Release: Negotiating Identity for a New Generation, Contemporary Arts Center, New Orleans, United States
  - Comic Release: Negotiating Identity for a New Generation, North Texas University, United States
  - Black Box, Palais de Tokyo, Paris
  - Scope Art Fair, New York
- 2002 : Supercellular ! De la Particule dans les Arts Plastiques au début du XXIème siècle, Valérie Cueto Gallery, Paris – Chicago – Madrid – Miami – Turin
- 2000 : L'Autre Europe n°2, Jeu de Paume Gallery, Paris
- 1997
  - Vitry-sur-Seine City Gallery, Vitry-sur-Seine, France
  - Transformers, CZKD, Belgrade
- 1996
  - Nova Gallery, Ibiza, Spain
  - Un cadeau unique, Lucien Durand Gallery, Paris
  - November in Vitry, Vitry-sur-Seine, France
- 1995 : Image pour Sarajevo, Le Sous-Sol Gallery, Paris
- 1994
  - Salon de Montrouge
  - L’art au marché, Paris
- 1993
  - Découverte, Philippe Uzan Gallery, Paris
  - Salon de Mai, Grand Palais, Paris
  - Falling astronauts, Louvain-la-Neuve and Antwerp, Belgium
