= Harold Snyder =

American businessperson (1922–2008)

- Born: April 25, 1922; Manhattan
- Died: December 18, 2008 (age 86)
- Education: B.A. New York University; M.A. Columbia University
- Occupation: Businessman
- Known for: founder of Biocraft Laboratories
- Spouses: Beatrice Snyder; Tamar Snyder
- Children: Beryl Snyder; Brian Snyder; Jay Snyder

Harold Snyder (April 25, 1922 – December 18, 2008) was an American businessperson who started Biocraft Laboratories, one of the earliest manufacturers of generic drugs.

== Early life and education ==
Snyder was born to a Jewish family in Manhattan and attended Erasmus Hall High School in Brooklyn. He attended New York University for his undergraduate studies and was awarded a master's degree from Columbia University in 1950, majoring in natural science.

== Biocraft Laboratories ==
He founded Biocraft Laboratories in Fair Lawn, New Jersey, in 1964 together with his wife Beatrice, who headed the company's financial operations and developed its inventory system. The firm produced antibiotics, such as penicillin and tetracycline, waiting for the expiration of patents on brand-name medications and then producing generic equivalents at lower prices. Biocraft was listed on the New York Stock Exchange in 1985, with Snyder stating that it was the first generic drug manufacturer to be listed on the Big Board.

The Snyders played a major role in establishing the standards and approval process with the U.S. Food and Drug Administration for generic pharmaceuticals. In 1991, Snyder expressed his concerns regarding FDA approval processes that had multiple chemists raising issues regarding generic versions of brand-name drugs.

The firm was able to produce generic versions in 1981 of Co-trimoxazole, which had been manufactured and sold under the brand names Bactrim and Septra in 1981, with the generics sold for half the price of the brand-name equivalents. Biocraft was able to use documentation previously prepared by Hoffmann–La Roche and Burroughs Wellcome, the original makers of the two drugs, to cut the cost of creating the processes needed to manufacture generic versions and obtain FDA approval. Burroughs Wellcome filed an appeal of the decision to allow approval of the Biocraft generic versions, with Snyder arguing that "Every day they can keep the generics off the market means more money in their pockets".

The firm opened a plant in Missouri in the 1980s that produced the active ingredients for the company's medications, and shipped those products to the Biocraft facilities in New Jersey for assembly and distribution.

=== Bioremediation ===
After a pipe burst at the company's Waldwick, New Jersey facilities, 33,000 gallons of chemicals contaminated the soil and groundwater at the site. Together with his employees, Snyder developed a technique to pump magnesium, nitrogen and other nutrients into the soil to help bacteria naturally present underground to digest the pollutants – which included benzene, methylene chloride, toluene and xylene – with carbon dioxide and water as the main byproducts, using a small pump house, two tanks and a network of pipes under the ground to implement the process. In the early 1980s, Snyder reported that the process had been used to successfully treat a soil sample from the Lipari landfill in Bridgeport, New Jersey, one of the state's most contaminated sites, and had been unofficially approved by the New Jersey Department of Environmental Protection for use at the Biocraft spill. Snyder estimated that the new method had purified five million gallons of contaminated water in three years at a cost of $80,000 compared to more than $2 million for traditional methods which would have taken years more to complete. Snyder patented the process in 1983, but did not develop the method on a commercial basis. Other bioremediation systems that use plants and microorganisms to clean up contaminants have been widely used since.

=== Teva Pharmaceutical ===
With annual sales of $150 million at the time, Biocraft was taken over by Teva Pharmaceutical Industries in 1996 in exchange for stock. Snyder was named a director at Teva. In 1997, he established HBJ Investments to invest in medical technology and pharmaceutical companies.

== Death ==
A resident of Manhattan and Westhampton, New York, Snyder died at age 86 on December 18, 2008, in Manhattan due to respiratory failure. His first wife, Beatrice, died in 1998, when they had been living in Cliffside Park, New Jersey. Snyder was survived by his second wife, Tamar Hirschl, three children, Beryl, Brian and Jay and six grandchildren.
