= Richard DeVore =

American sculptor (1933–2006)

Richard E. DeVore
- Born: April 27, 1933; Toledo, Ohio, U.S.
- Died: June 25, 2006 (aged 73); Fort Collins, Colorado, U.S.
- Other name: Richard De Vore
- Education: University of Toledo, Cranbrook Academy of Art
- Occupations: cermacist, professor

Richard E. DeVore, also written as Richard De Vore (1933 – 2006) was an American ceramicist, professor. He was known for stoneware. He was faculty at Cranbrook Academy of Art’s Ceramics Department, from 1966 to 1978.

== Background and education ==
Untitled (#403), multi-glazed stoneware by Richard DeVore, 1983, Smithsonian American Art Museum

Richard E. DeVore was born in Toledo, Ohio on April 27, 1933. He earned a bachelor of education degree with an art major from the University of Toledo in 1955, and received a master of fine arts degree from the Cranbrook Academy of Art in 1957. While in Michigan, he studied ceramics under Maija Grotell, an influential Finnish-born American ceramist.

== Career ==
In 1966, DeVore became head of the ceramics department at Cranbrook Academy of Art. He joined the Colorado State University art faculty in 1978 where he continued teaching until 2004.

In 1987, DeVore was installed as a fellow of the American Craft Council. Based in Fort Collins, Colorado, he was known for simple, organic forms finished in dull glazes that suggest polished stones, sun-bleached bones, or even translucent skin.

== Death ==
DeVore died from lung cancer in Fort Collins, Colorado on June 25, 2006.

== Collections ==
DeVore's ceramic works are represented at the following museum collections:

- American Craft Museum, New York
- Arizona State University Art Museum
- Arkansas Art Center, Little Rock, Arkansas
- Museum Boijmans Van Beuningen, Rotterdam, Holland
- Butler Institute of American Art, Youngstown, Ohio
- Cleveland Museum of Art, Cleveland, Ohio
- Honolulu Museum of Art Spalding House, Honolulu, Hawaii
- Cranbrook Academy of Art Museum, Bloomfield Hills, Michigan
- Daum Museum of Contemporary Art, Sedalia, Missouri
- Delaware Art Museum, Wilmington, Delaware
- Denver Art Museum, Denver, Colorado
- Detroit Institute of Art, Detroit, Michigan
- Eastern Michigan University, Art Gallery, Ypsilanti, Michigan
- Everson Museum of Art, Syracuse, New York
- Flint Institute of Arts, Flint, Michigan
- Nora Eccles Harrison Museum of Art, Utah State University at Logan, Utah
- High Museum of Art, Atlanta, Georgia
- John Michael Kohler Arts Center, Sheboygan, Wisconsin
- Joslyn Art Museum, Omaha, Nebraska
- Kestner-Museum, Hanover, Germany
- Krannert Art Museum, University of Illinois at Champaign, Illinois
- Kruithuis Museum, The Netherlands
- Los Angeles County Museum of Art, Los Angeles, California
- Metropolitan Museum of Art, New York City, New York
- M. H. de Young Memorial Museum, San Francisco, California
- Milwaukee Art Museum, Milwaukee, Wisconsin
- Minneapolis Institute of Arts, Minneapolis, Minnesota
- Mint Museum, Charlotte, North Carolina
- Museum of Art, University of Iowa, Iowa City
- Museum of Fine Arts, Houston, Houston, Texas
- National Collection of Contemporary Art, Paris, France
- Nelson-Atkins Museum of Art, Kansas City, Missouri
- Newark Museum, Newark, New Jersey
- Philadelphia Museum of Art, Philadelphia, Pennsylvania
- Philbrook Museum of Art, Tulsa, Oklahoma
- Sheldon Memorial Art Gallery, University of Nebraska at Lincoln, Lincoln, Nebraska
- Smithsonian American Art Museum, Washington, DC
- St. Louis Art Museum, St. Louis, Missouri
- University of Colorado Museum of Natural History, Boulder, Colorado
- University of Michigan Gallery, Ann Arbor, Michigan
- Utah Museum of Fine Arts, Salt Lake City, Utah
- Victoria and Albert Museum, London, England
- Yale University Art Gallery, New Haven, Connecticut
