= Milton Hirschl =

American painter

- Born: Čakovec, Općina Čakovec, Međimurje County, Croatia

Milton Hirschl (1917–1999) was a Los Angeles based artist with paintings which had been exhibited throughout the US, including the Museum of Modern Art, the Brooklyn Museum, the Skirball Cultural Center, the Smithsonian, the Canton Museum of Art and the Hammer Museum. One of his paintings is listed on Etsy.

Hirschl also wrote a textbook about creative figure drawing. His book received at least one 5 star rating from an Amazon reviewer.

Hirschl taught for almost 40 years at the Pierce College, served in the military during World War II, was educated at Ohio State University, and Paris' Ecole des Beaux Arts and the Atelier de la Grande Chaumière. He was married to Sylvie Fihman, they had a child Private. While at Pierce, Hirschl received a grant as part of a project to evaluate instructional development. Milton has an entry in the Design Encyclopedia.
