= Paul Dresang =

American ceramic artist

Paul Dresang (born 1948 in Appleton, Wisconsin) is an American ceramic artist and professor at Southern Illinois University Edwardsville. Working mainly with glass, porcelain, and clay, Dresang’s “highly individual, sensuous, salt-fired porcelain forms are decorated with an obsessive amount of detail.” He defines his work primarily as “post-modern fertility pieces".” Dresang aims to create surreal images with ceramics by often focusing on everyday items in his work and by exploring “opposing ideas of constraint and breaking free.”. After receiving his MFA, Dresang has gone on to become a highly sought-after potter. He has presented his work in countless group exhibitions, and is featured in many permanent collections nationally. He is currently located in Edwardsville, Illinois.

== Education and career ==
After growing up in Appleton, Wisconsin, Dresang attended the University of Minnesota, where he earned a MFA in Ceramics in 1974. In January 1975, Dresang began his first teaching position in Advanced Ceramics at the Wisconsin State University at Oshkosh. After leaving this post in May 1975, he became an Instructor at The Cleveland Institute of Art, where he remained until 1977. From 1977 to the present day, Dresang has been teaching at Southern Illinois University Edwardsville as a Professor of Ceramics and Glassblowing. He attained the rank of Distinguished Research Professor in 2008.

== Artist's statements ==
"My greatest hope is that when people approach my work, they will be challenged to decide what they see in it. In a way they have to risk themselves, especially if they share their observations. Anyone who views my work and cares about it cannot avoid investing something of themselves in the process." –Paul Dresang

== Awards ==
- 2008 SIUE Distinguished Research Professor (one semester release time for research)
- 2000 SIUE Graduate School, Summer Research Fellowship (2001), $6000
- 1999 Illinois Arts Council Fellowship Award, $500: League of Maryland Craftsmen, "Fine Art of Craft" Exhibition – Award Summer Research Fellowship, SIUE Graduate School, $3,000
- 1997-98 Faculty Development Grant, $2,000
- 1995 Senior Assignment, Travel and Study in Mexico Grants, With Associate Professor Laura Strand, 1995, 1996, 1998, 2001, 2006
- 1994 The St. Louis Art Show, 1st Place, $1,000, St. Louis, MO, Awards '95, 96, 98
- 1990-91 Illinois Arts Council Fellowship Grant, $10,000
- 1990 "Blown, Fused and Cast Glass", $5,000, Fourth Quarter Research Grant, Office of Research and Projects, SIUE
- 1988 National Endowment for the Visual Arts Fellowship Grant
- 1985 International Ceramic Symposium USA '85 Invitational, One Month, Appalachian Center for Crafts, Cookeville, TN

== Museum collections ==
Dresang’s work is part of the following public collections:

- Racine Art Museum, Racine WI
- The Renwick Gallery, National Museum of Art, Smithsonian Institution, Washington, D.C.
- The Mint Museum of Craft and Design, Charlotte, NC
- Los Angeles County Museum of Art, Wilshire Blvd., Los Angeles, CA
- Southern Illinois University, Permanent Collection, Edwardsville, IL
- The Tai Pei County Ceramics Museum, Tai Pei, Taiwan

== Selected group exhibitions ==
Dresang has exhibited at museums and galleries of note in the United States and Taiwan, including the following:

- 2010 "Hot Tea: 13th Biennial Teapot Exhibition", National Group Invitational Exhibition, Craft Alliance Gallery, St. Louis, MO
- 2009 "Warren MacKenzie: Legacy of an American Potter", (students of Warren MacKenzie) The Museum of Craft and Folk Art, San Francisco, CA
- 2009 “Homegrown," St. Louis Area Artists, Duane Reed Gallery, St. Louis, MO
- 2007 "Ceramics Today", Group Invitational Exhibition, Flaten Art Museum, St. Olaf College, Northfield, MN
- 2007 "Trompe L' Oeil: The Art of Illusion" Group Invitational Exhibition, Lakeview Museum of Art and Sciences Peoria, IL
- 2006 Ceramic Invitational, Group Exhibition, University of Miami, Coral Gables, FL
- 2006 “Yixing Effect” Traveling Exhibit, Holter Museum of Art, Helena, MT
- 2006 “Vitamin C: It’s Good For You”, Cinema Gallery, Urbana, IL
- 2005 “National Ceramic Invitational”, Bedford Gallery, Walnut Creek, CA
- 2004 “Art to Use: Functional Clay”, Thirteen Moons Gallery, Santa Fe, NM
