= Guerra de la Paz =

Guerra de la Paz is a group of Cuban born artists Alain Guerra and Neraldo de la Paz who live and work in Miami, and have been collaborating since 1996.

Their work has been exhibited in several countries, with their most recent solo projects at the Aichi Triennale, Okazaki, Japan, Augeo Art Space, Rimini, Italy, Biennale Internationale du lin de Portneuf, Quebec, Canada, Kurumaya Museum, Oyama, Japan and at the Zacheta National Gallery of Art, Warsaw, Poland.

In 2014, the group was commissioned by Wooyoungmi Paris to create a body of new sculptural works, beginning with a solo exhibition at their MANMADE - Wooyoungmi Lifestyle Headquarters in Seoul, Korea.
