= Tamar Hirschl =

Croatian-American artist

- Born: Tamar Hirschl; Zagreb, Croatia
- Occupation: Artist
- Years active: Since 1999
- Notable work: The Testimony of the Deer

Tamar Hirschl is a Croatian–American artist. Her work relates to disturbances caused by political conflicts, man-made problems and urbanization affecting the environment. She has held several solo exhibitions in Israel, Europe, New York City and Zagreb. "Cultural Alarm" is one of her fine art works which vividly shows human and environmental damage. She has adopted many techniques and different types of materials.

== Biography ==
Hirschl was born in Zagreb, Croatia, and moved to Tel Aviv following the Holocaust that she witnessed from a Nazi detention camp in Hungary. She has a master's degree (MA) from Lesley College and also from Cambridge, Massachusetts. She studied in Israel at the State College of Art, the Kalisher School of Art, and the Bezalel School of Art.

Hirschl started painting from a young age while in Croatia. In Israel, she pursued a career in painting and held several solo exhibitions in Israel, Europe, and the United States. She migrated to New York City in 1999. In the United States she started painting murals using acrylic paints, which were akin to billboard painting. In these paintings her personal sufferings of disaster and global wars formed the main theme. From 2004, she adopted to the technique of collage paintings.

Hirschl's refrain is: "I focus on raising awareness of women’s rights and speaking out for those who cannot speak out for or protect themselves, including animals and nature. I hope that my work will help end the cycle of abuse that has gone on for so long, and support the autonomy of all living creatures."

One of Hirschl's most notable paintings is the Cultural Alarm which attempts to highlight human interference with nature. Laura Kruger succinctly comments on her painting as: "The unimaginable scope and horror of the events that invest these works, the Holocaust, the World Trade Center attack, the Columbia Space Shuttle disaster, demand absolute attention on a grand scale." Apart from Cultural Alarm, her other notable paintings include: Mementos III, Protest, Deer Watch, and Trauma set on vinyl and paper. She has sculpted Civilization in a series made from acrylic resin and built within Plexiglass aquariums. Her collage series made on paper are Flight I and Flight II.

Hirschl's recent solo exhibitions were held at: the Philadelphia Art Alliance, the 51st Venice Biennale, and the 9th International Istanbul Biennial. Examples of her work are in the permanent collection of the Queens Museum of Art.

Jerusalem Films and the Government of Croatia jointly produced a documentary on her artistic achievements under the title Bridges of Memories; it was narrated by Martin Sheen, and JakovSedlar directed and produced the film.

The Film Society of the Lincoln Center chose her painting The Window as the official poster for its 38th Film Festival; it was supplemented by an illustrated catalog with a writeup by Tom Finkelpearl, executive director of the Queens Museum of Art.

== Personal life ==
Hirschl was married to Harold Snyder, an American businessperson of Biocraft Laboratorie who died in 2009 at the age of 87. She was his second wife.
