= Honolulu Museum of Art School =

- Linekona School
- U.S. National Register of Historic Places
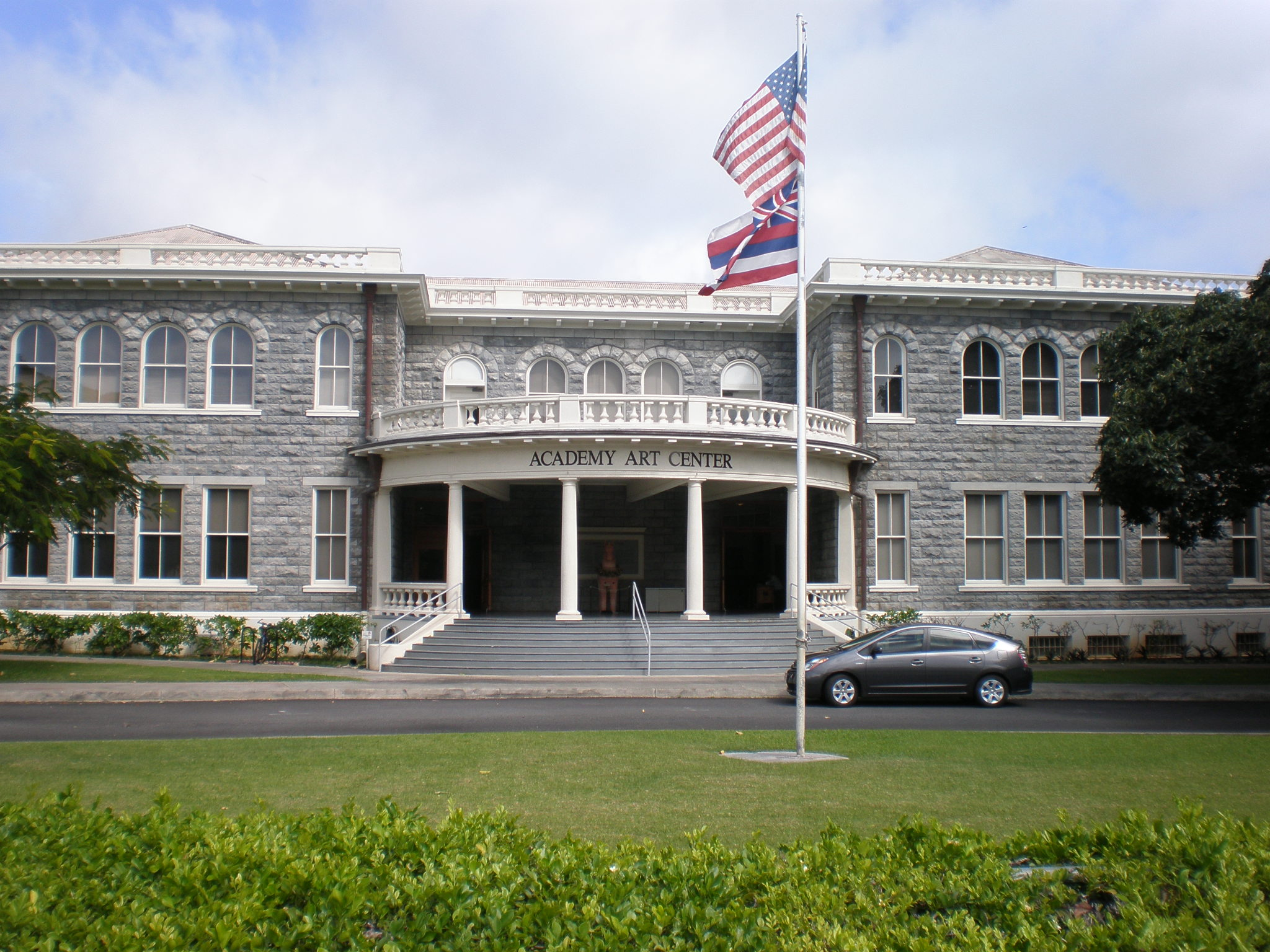
- The Honolulu Museum of Art School in April 2009

- Location within Honolulu Location within Oahu Location within Hawaii
- Location: Victoria and S. Beretania Streets, Honolulu, Hawaii
- Coordinates: 21°18′10″N 157°50′52″W
- Area: 2 acres (0.81 ha)
- Built: 1908
- Architect: Henry Livingston Kerr
- Architectural style: Colonial Revival, Romanesque Revival
- NRHP reference No.: 80001279
- Added to NRHP: May 28, 1980

The Honolulu Museum of Art School (HoMA School), formerly known as Linekona School, is a historic school building in Honolulu, Hawaiʻi, that now serves as a center for arts education for the Honolulu Museum of Art.

== History ==
As an educational institution, the school's legacy traces back to Oahu Charity School in 1831, which was for a few years the only English-language school in Hawaiʻi, and one of only six west of the Rockies. Weakened by competition from other private schools founded in the 1840s, it began to receive public funds in 1851 and changed its name to Town Free School, but only came under control of the public superintendent of schools in 1859. In 1865, the public board of education separated boys and girls, renaming Town Free School into Mililani School for Girls while sending most of the boys to Royal School. However, a few of the boys transferred to the new, privately run Fort Street English Day School, which became public in 1873, and became Honolulu High School in 1895, while the lower grades formed the new Kaiulani Elementary School. Classes met in the former palace of Princess Ruth Keelikolani on Queen Emma Street, where Central Intermediate School now stands.

In 1907, Honolulu High School was renamed President William McKinley High School and moved into the new school building completed in 1908 on the former Maertens property facing Thomas Square. After McKinley High moved into a new, larger campus on S. King Street in 1923, its former site became Linekona (or Lincoln) Elementary School.

In its current function, the Honolulu Museum of Art School (formerly the Academy Art Center at Linekona) offers studio art classes and workshops, and hosts exhibitions showcasing the island's folk and contemporary artists. The school offers arts education programs for children with special needs and public school students and maintains a lending collection for educators, students, and community groups.

In October 2021, construction started to create a courtyard and to expand the kiln house by 2,000 square feet (190 m^{2}).

== Architecture ==
The eclectic architecture of the building combines two principal styles. Colonial Revival styles were very popular for both residential and public buildings when the school was built in 1908. The building's symmetry, proportions, large columned portico, and balustraded roofline are typical of the style. At the same time, the round arches on the upper-story windows and the stone block facade are typical of the Romanesque Revival style that was often employed for substantial public buildings in that period. However, the imitation stone facade is actually formed from carefully rendered concrete blocks—the best example of such craftsmanship in Hawaiʻi.

== See also ==
- Honolulu Printmakers
