= Joseph Raffael =

American contemporary realist painter (1933–2021)

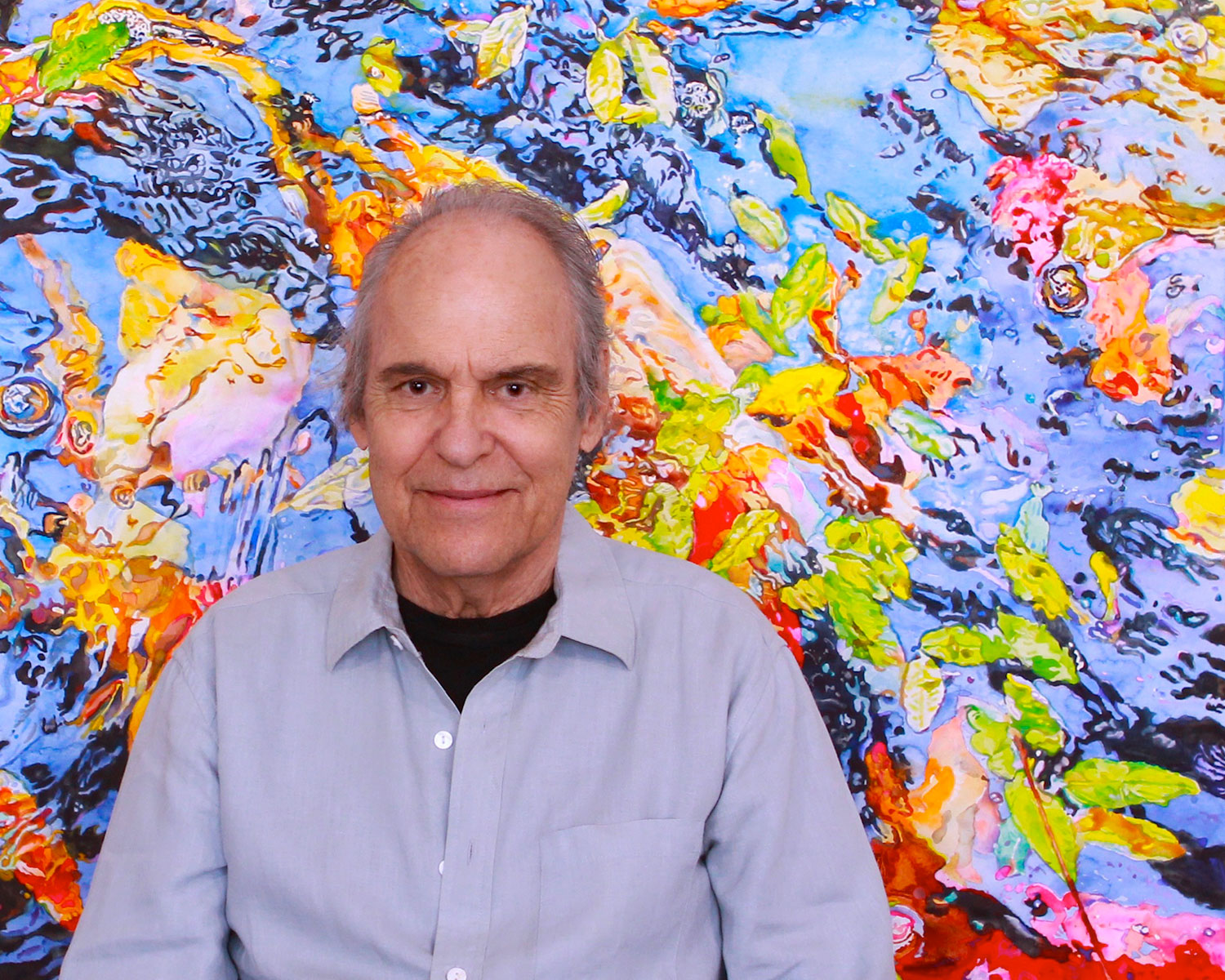
- Joseph Raffael - 2013
- Born: Joe Raffaele; 22 February 1933; Brooklyn, NY, United States
- Died: 12 July 2021 (aged 88); Cagnes-sur-Mer
- Education: Cooper Union for the Advancement of Science and Art Yale School of Art
- Known for: Painting Watercolor
- Notable work: Moving Toward the Light II (2016); Blossoms and Sky (2008); Renewal (1995); Blue Pond, Winter Shore (1977); Hilo (1975)
- Spouse(s): Lannis Raffael, Judy North
- Awards: 1974: First Prize, Tokyo International Biennial, Japan
- Website: josephraffael.com

Joseph Raffael (born February 22, 1933 – July 12, 2021) was an American contemporary realist painter known for his large-scale watercolors.

== Early life ==
Raffael was born on February 22, 1933 in Brooklyn, New York. He was the youngest of three children and the only son of Sicilian and Swiss-Irish parents, Joseph Marino Raffaele and Cora Kaelin Raffaele. He became interested in drawing at age 7, and during high school years took classes at the Brooklyn Museum. From 1953–54, he attended Cooper Union for the Advancement of Science and Art. In the summer of 1954 he studied with Josef Albers at the Yale Summer School, then attended Yale University where he received his BFA in 1956.

== Career ==
In 1958, he won a Fulbright fellowship to study for two years in Florence and Rome, and began painting complexly colored watercolors of flower forms. He mounted his first New York City exhibition of his Umbrian watercolors in 1963, at the d’Arcy Galleries, while at the same time battling hepatitis from which he almost died; when he recovered, he shifted to "real life" images based on photographs.

Raffael’s work received critical praise beginning in the mid-1960s. In 1965, Eleanor Ward’s Stable Gallery held a one-person show of his work. In 1972, using photographs of rivers taken by the artist William Allan, he began to produce his "water painting".

In 1973 Time Magazine published an article by Robert Hughes A Slice of the River, describing his water paintings. Hughes stated that the artist’s color-drenched canvases display “a tender virtuosity without parallel in other American figurative painting today.”

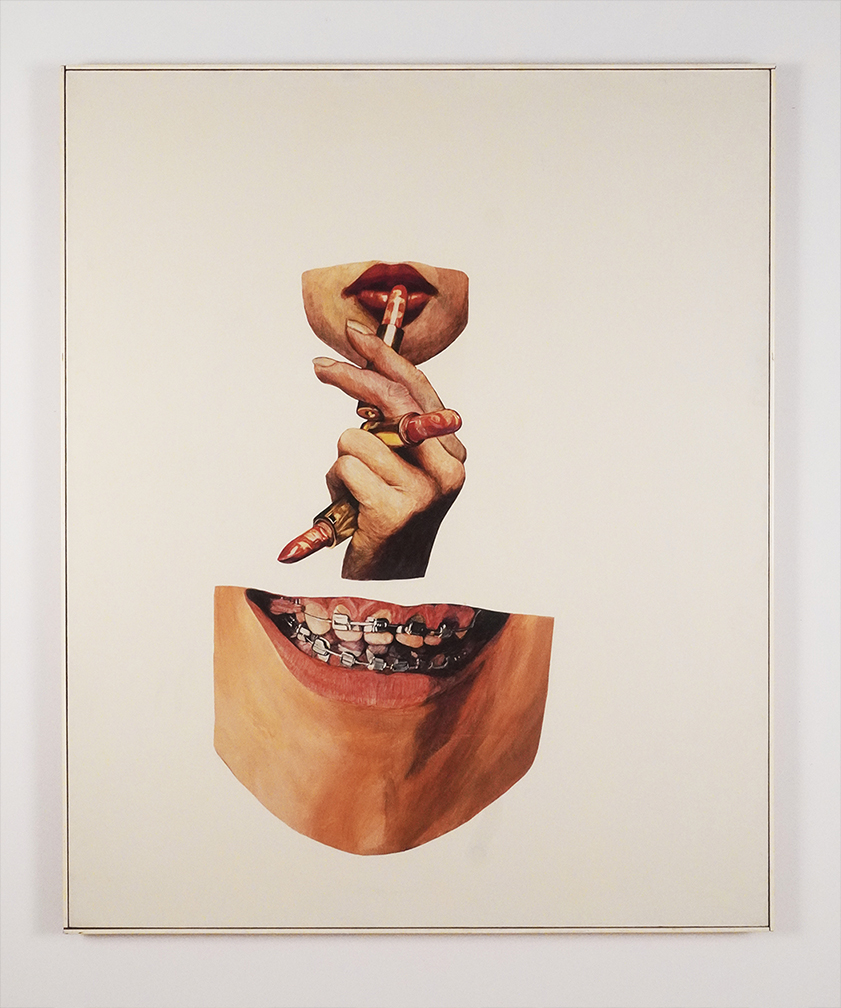
Lipstick, Braces, 1955, Oil on Canvas, 55" x 40"

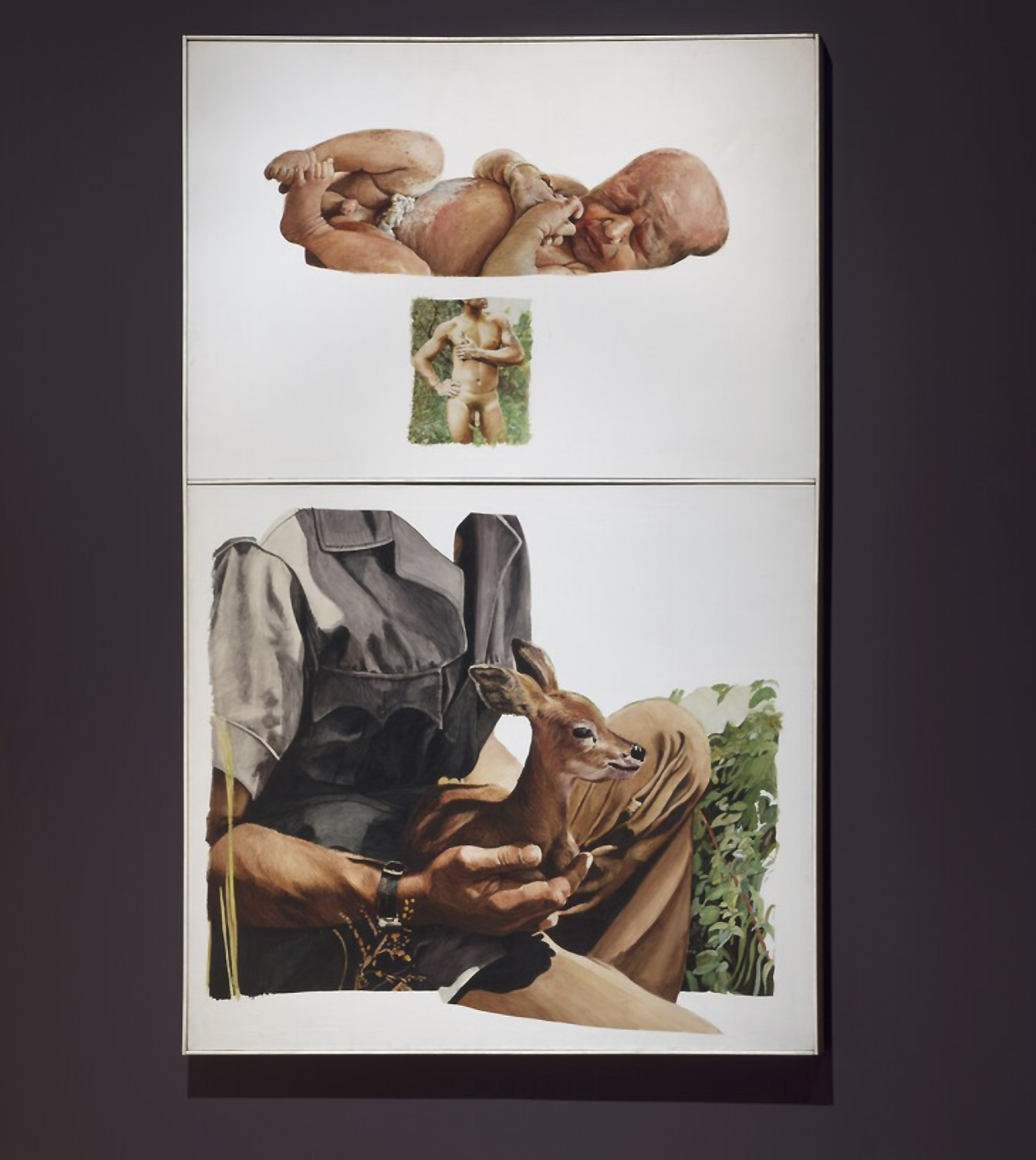
Man, Boy, Doe, 1965, Whitney Museum

In 2018, Raffael collaborated with David Pagel to produce Talking Beauty: A Conversation Between Joseph Raffael and David Pagel about Art, Love, Death, and Creativity. In a review of the book in the San Francisco Review of Books, it was written that, "...the joy of this book is slowly reading the interchange of ideas form the exchanged emails between these two men – comments on life, death, art and artists, writing, creativity, children, pets – all blended into a wondrous tapestry of the essence of being truly alive.""

== Critical reception and legacy ==
In 2026, Nancy Hoffman Gallery presented White Ground Paintings, an exhibition devoted to Raffael's early paintings from the mid-1960s. The exhibition reunited works originally shown at the Stable Gallery in New York in 1965, bringing renewed attention to a formative period in the artist's career before his transition to the large-scale watercolor paintings for which he later became known. Reviewing the exhibition for Whitehot Magazine, art critic Riad Miah described the paintings as "strikingly prescient", writing that their fragmented imagery, expansive white grounds, and open pictorial structure anticipated concerns associated with later postmodern painting while continuing to resonate with contemporary visual culture. In an article from 1982, artist Wayne Theibaub reflected on Raffael as typifying "what it meant to be a serious artist. He continues to pursue serious problems in art while staying on the mark, producing substantive work week after week, year after year. He's a good example...of a man who remains true to his aesthetic preoccupations."

== Collections ==
Joseph Raffael's paintings are in the collections of nearly 50 museums and public institutions, including the Oakland Museum of California, the Art Institute of Chicago, and the Whitney Museum of American Art, among others. The Whitney's holdings span multiple periods of Raffael's career, including the early oil painting Man, Boy, Doe (c. 1967), Water Painting No. 5 (1973) and Pink Lily with Dragonfly (1981). Man, Boy, Doe was recently acquired by the. museum and featured in its 2025-2026 exhibition Sixties Surreal, examining the influence of Surrealism on American art of the 1960's.

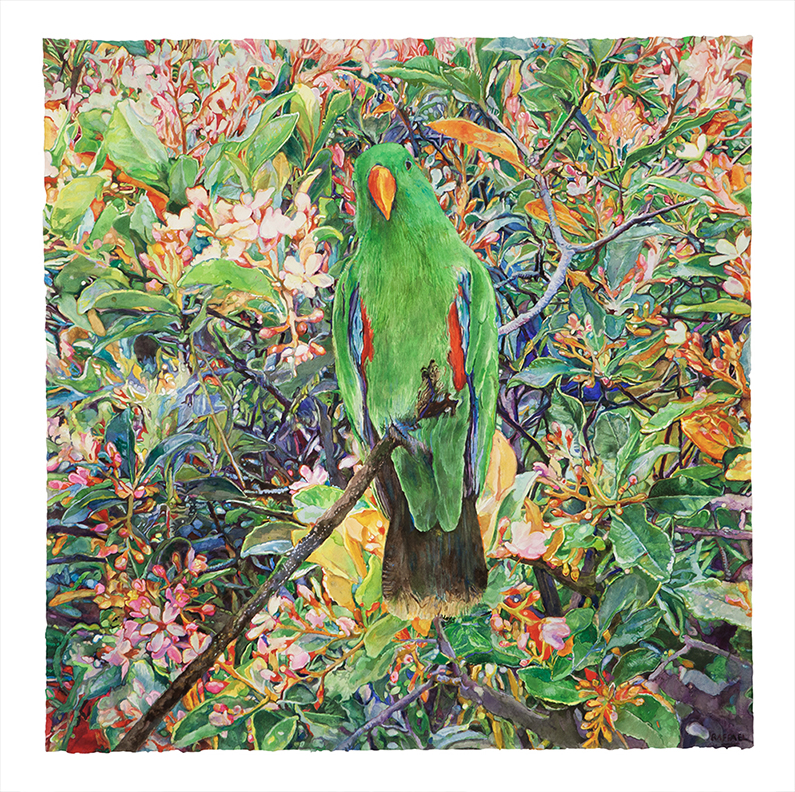
Parrot Moving Towards the Light, 2020

== Personal life ==
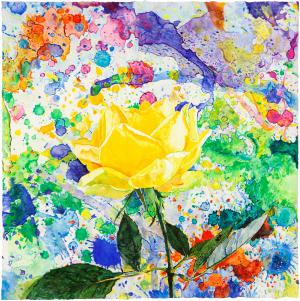
For Lannis 1944-2019, watercolor on paper, 91.4 x 91.4 cm - 36 x 36 in. | 2019

On May 19, 2019 his wife Lannis Wood Raffael died after a long period of health crises. Before her death, Raffael completed his painting "For Lannis: 1944–2019".

Raffael died in Cagnes-sur-Mer at the age of 88 on July 12, 2021.

== Awards ==
- 1974 First Prize, Tokyo International Biennial, Japan
- 1960 Louis Comfort Tiffany Fellowship
- 1958 Fulbright Fellowship

== Selected publications ==
=== Books ===
Raffael, Joseph; Pagel, David; Erlanson, Amanda (ed.). Talking Beauty: A Conversation Between Joseph Raffael and David Pagel About Art, Love, Death, and Creativity (Zero+ Publishing, 2018); ISBN 978-1937222512

Goodman, Lanie; Dillard Stroud, Betsy; Pagel, David. Moving Toward the Light: Joseph Raffael (ACC Editions, 2015); ISBN 978-1851498055

Wallach, Amei; Kuspit, Donald. Reflections of Nature, Paintings by Joseph Raffael (Abbeyville Press, 1998); ISBN 978-0789202802

Arthur, John. Realists at Work: Studio Interviews and Working Methods of Ten Leading Contemporary Painters (Watson-Guptill Publications, 1983); ISBN 978-0823045105
