= List of artists who made prints of Hawaii and its people =

- Charles W. Bartlett
- Marguerite Louis Blasingame
- Amelia R. Coats
- Isami Doi
- Robert Lee Eskridge
- Cornelia MacIntyre Foley
- Juliette May Fraser
- John Melville Kelly
- Kate Kelly
- Paul Landacre
- Huc-Mazelet Luquiens
- Alexander Samuel MacLeod
- Ambrose Patterson
- Louis Pohl
- Robert Riggs
- Shirley Ximena Hopper Russell

== See also ==
- Category:Printmakers from Hawaii
- List of artists who painted Hawaii and its people
- List of artists who sculpted Hawaii and its people
