= Amelia R. Coats =

American printmaker (1872–1949)

- Born: Amelia Ruth Coats; 1872; Minnesota
- Died: 1949 (aged 76–77); Honolulu
- Known for: Printmaking

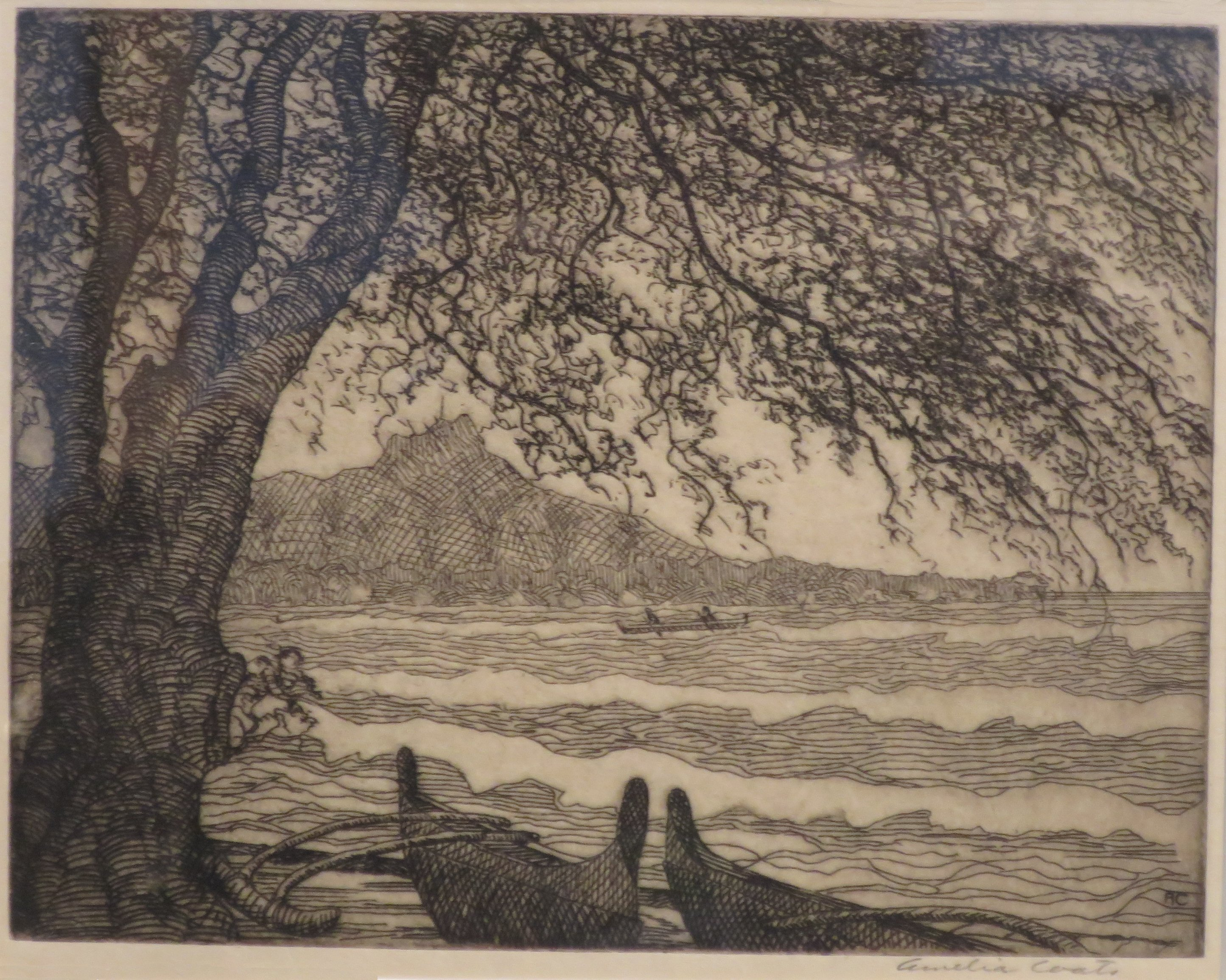
Kiawe and Canoes by Amelia R. Coats, etching, Honolulu Museum of Art

Amelia Ruth Coats (1872–1949) was an American printmaker known for her small, detailed etchings, mostly from the first quarter of the twentieth century. They consist primarily of Hawaiian landscapes featuring idyllic settings. They are typically undated and without information about the size of the edition. Kiawe and Canoes, in the collection of the Honolulu Museum of Art is typical of her oeuvre.

== Biography ==
Coats migrated to Hawaii in the early 20th century, appearing in arriving passenger rolls in August 1903, when she was aboard the SS Aorangi from Vancouver to Honolulu. She lived for the rest of her life in Hawaii, dying in 1949 and having her ashes scattered at sea from a traditional Outrigger. She worked as a stenographer and learnt the art of printmaking while in Hawaii. She specialised in etching and wood blocking and taught printmaking classes.

She purchased land in the Palolo Valley in 1905. In 1915, she was part of a large party from Honolulu's Trail and Mountain Club that traveled to Maui to hike up Haleakala, led by Alexander Hume Ford.

Her artwork was part of a group show of Honolulu Printmakers at the Honolulu Academy of Arts in November 1930, along with works by Alexander Samuel MacLeod, Huc-Mazelet Luquiens, John Melville Kelly, and Kate Kelly. "Miss Amelia Coats" donated two prints to the Honolulu Academy of Arts in 1933. In a 1934 Hawaii directory, Amelia R. Coats is listed as a clerk for the United States Geological Survey at Spreckelsville on Maui.

Her prints are in the Miriam and Ira D. Wallach Division of Art, Prints and Photographs collection of the New York Public Library and the Honolulu Museum of Art.
