= Charles W. Bartlett =

English painter and printmaker (1860–1940)

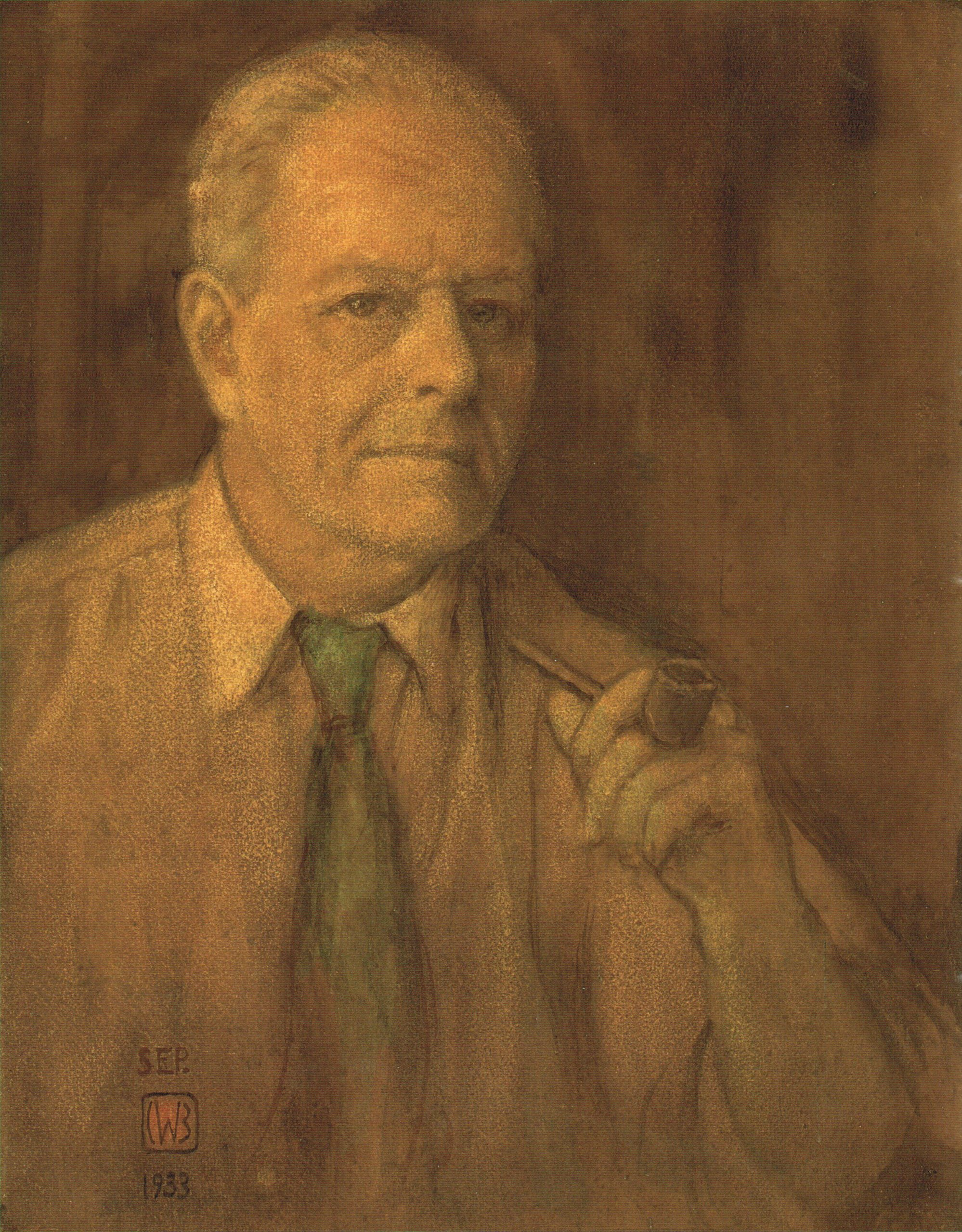
- Watercolour self-portrait, 1933
- Born: 1 June 1860; Bridport, Dorset, England
- Died: 16 April 1940 (aged 79); Hawaii
- Education: London, Paris
- Known for: Painting, printmaking
- Patrons: Anna Rice Cooke

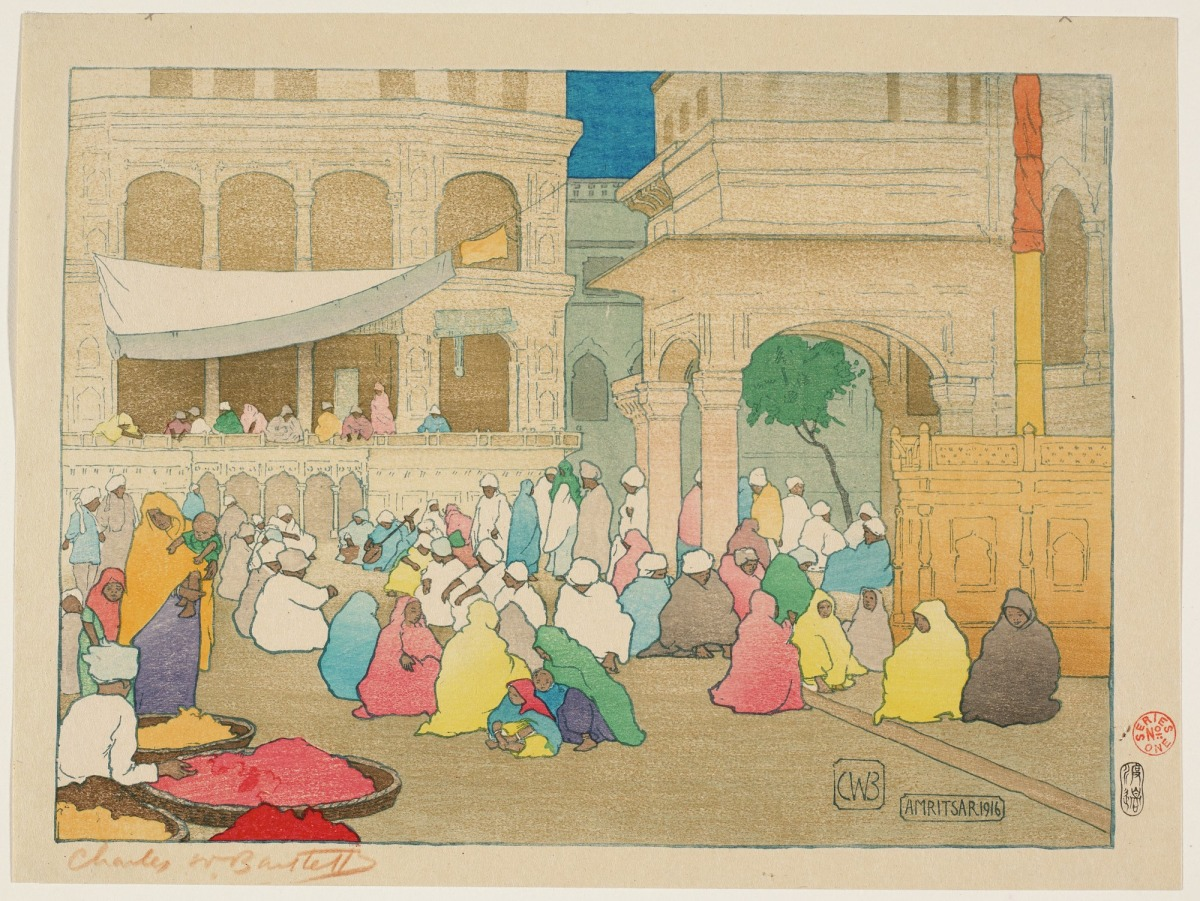
Amritsar, 1916, woodblock print

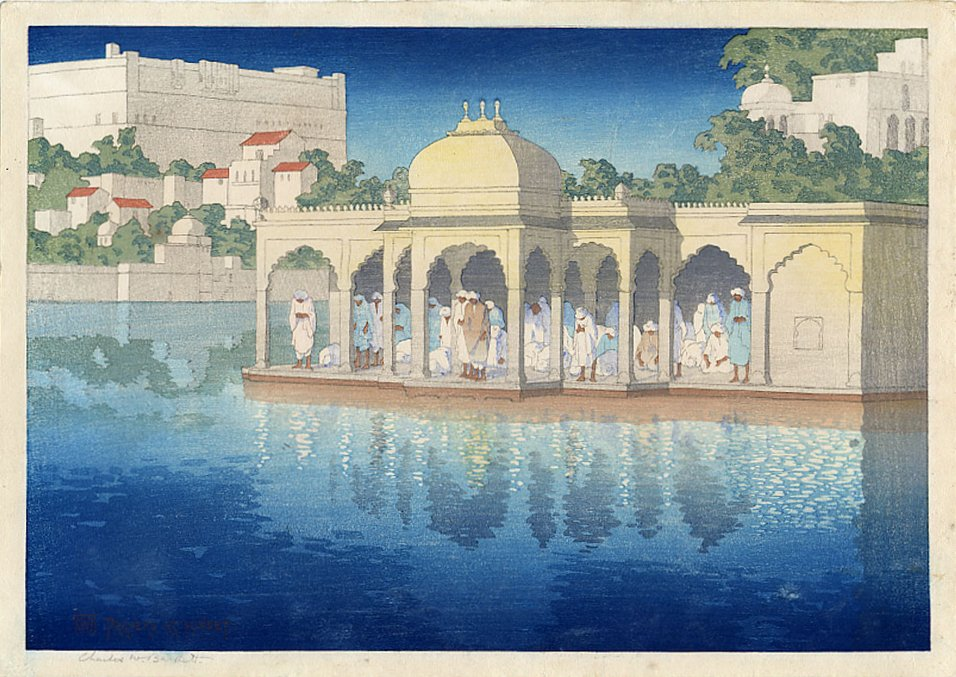
Prayers at Sunset (Udaipur, India), c. 1919, woodblock print

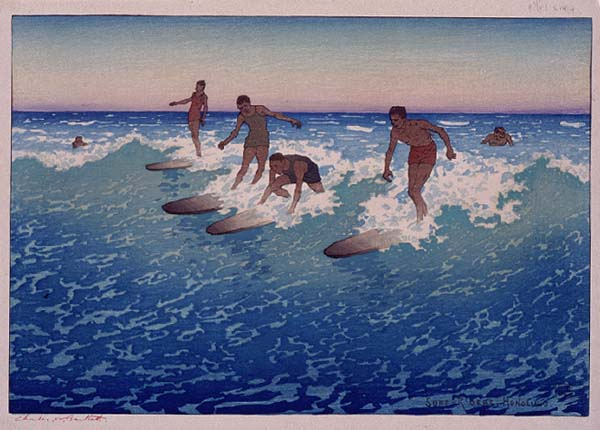
Surf-Riders, Honolulu, 1919, colour woodcut

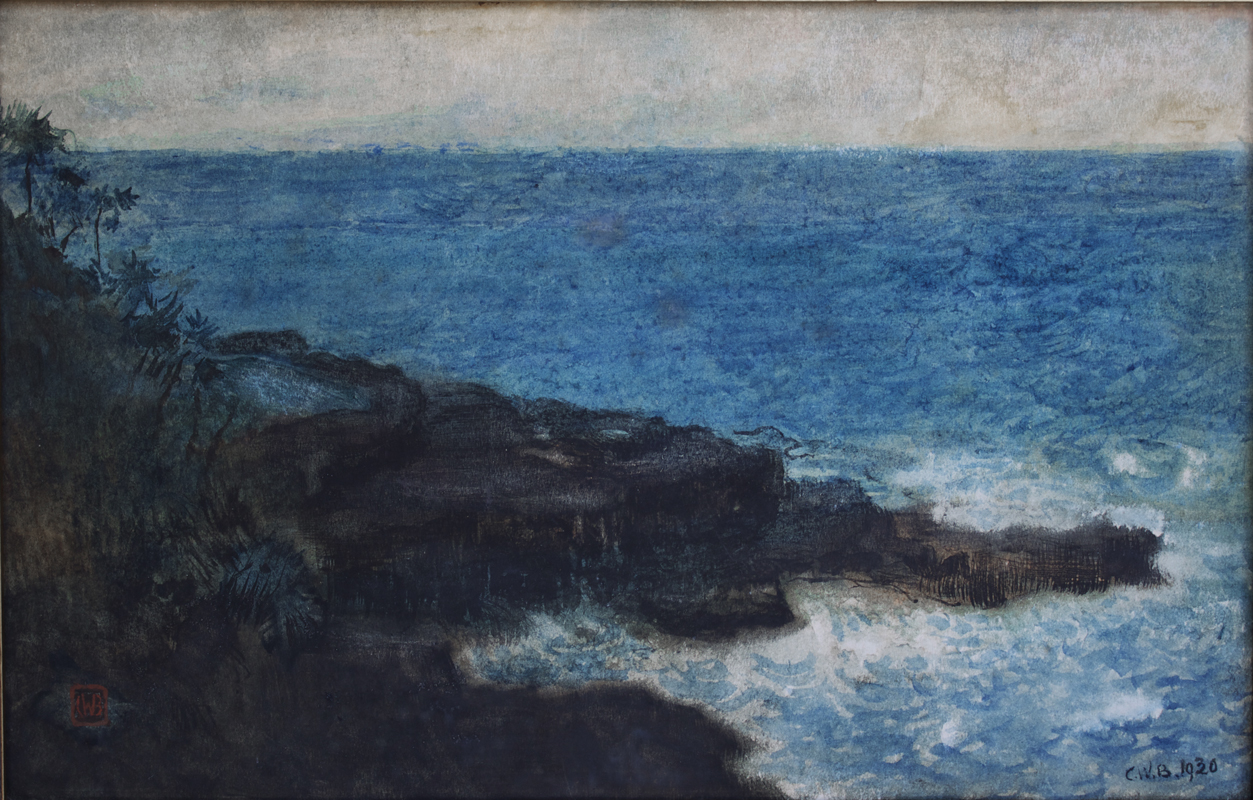
Hana Maui Coast, 1920, watercolour and ink

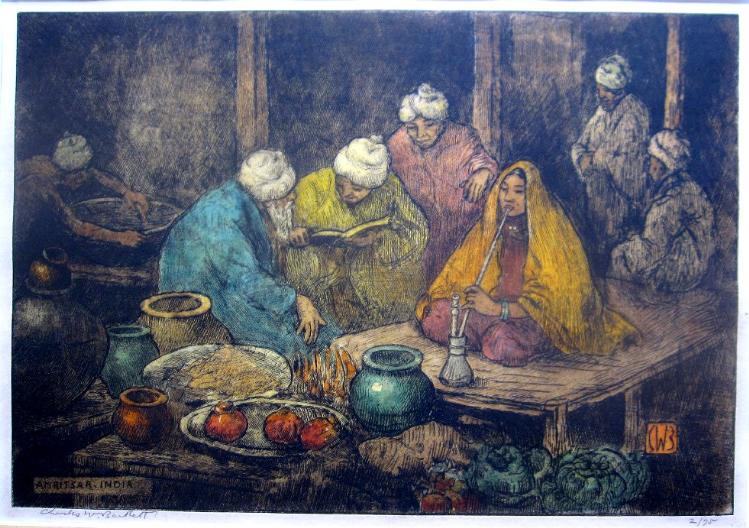
Amritsar, India, 1923–27, hand-colored etching

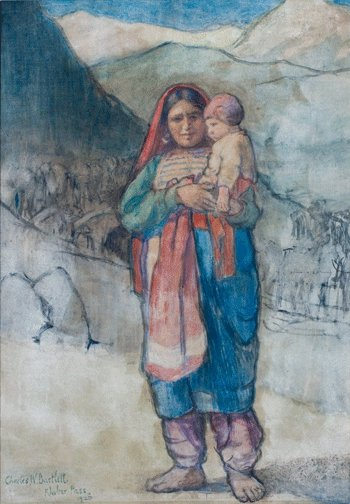
Afghani Mother and Child (Khyber Pass), 1920

Charles William Bartlett (1 June 1860 – 16 April 1940) was an English painter and printmaker who settled in Hawaii.

== Biography ==
Bartlett studied metallurgy and worked in that field for several years. At age 23, he enrolled in the Royal Academy in London, where he studied painting and etching. After three years of study in London, he entered the private studio school Académie Julian in Paris, where he studied under Jules Joseph Lefebvre (1836–1911) and Gustave Boulanger (1824–1888).

In 1889, he returned to England and married Emily Tate, but shortly thereafter, his wife and infant son died in childbirth. Bartlett then traveled to Europe, spending several productive years in the Netherlands, Brittany and Venice with his friend and fellow artist Frank Brangwyn (1867–1956). Brangwyn is believed to have introduced Bartlett to Japanese prints. Bartlett produced some of his most important early works on the Continent, especially studies of peasants painted in broad areas of colour. He was invited to join the Société Nationale des Beaux-Arts in France in 1897. In 1898, he returned to England and married Catherine "Kate" Main. Bartlett returned to the Continent with his second wife, and in 1908, he helped found the Société de la Peinture a l'Eau in Paris. Several Continental museums acquired his paintings at the Paris exhibitions of the Société de la Peinture a l'Eau.

Bartlett made several trips to Brittany and the Netherlands with the Dutch painter Nico Wilhelm Jungmann (1872–1935), which provided the former with material for future paintings of peasants, whose dignity derived from the simple placement of shapes.

In 1913, with financial backing from his wife's well-to-do family, the Bartletts traveled to India, Ceylon, Indonesia, China, and Japan. He arrived in Japan in 1915, where he met woodblock print publisher Watanabe Shōzaburō (1885–1962), who was a major force in early 20th-century Japanese art (shin-hanga). It was the Austrian artist Fritz Capelari who introduced Bartlett to Watanabe's shop, taking him to show the watercolours he had produced during his long journey; Watanabe was struck by their broad, flat areas of colour, which matched his own idea of what a modern Japanese print should look like. In 1916 Watanabe published 21 woodblocks from Bartlett's designs, including six prints of Japanese landscapes. To ease the block-carving process, Watanabe had Bartlett convert his pencil designs into Japanese-style ink-and-brush paintings before production began. The first series comprised six Indian scenes plus the cover print Taj Mahal at Sunset, in which light and dark values are used to notable effect, the famous mausoleum relegated to a partial, sun-drenched view in the background rather than dominating the composition; the second series of six prints depicted Japanese landscapes and townscapes in a style recalling Hiroshige, updated for a modern sensibility. In 1917, Bartlett and his second wife left Japan for England; however, they stopped off in Hawaii, where they remained—never returning to England. He did visit Japan in 1919, where he created sixteen shin-hanga prints for Watanabe.

During that 1919 visit Bartlett also met Elizabeth Keith, with whom he formed an immediate friendship. He remained in contact with Watanabe throughout the following years, designing sixteen further shin-hanga prints, some depicting Hawaiian subjects such as Honolulu and Surf-Riders, the latter said to portray the Olympic swimming champion Duke Kahanamoku, which were exhibited alongside work by fellow shin-hanga artists Elizabeth Keith, Charles Bartlett's contemporary Shinsui Itō and Hiroshi Yoshida; his last shin-hanga design was Hour of Prayer, India (1925). A second state of Surf-Riders, made around 1920–21, darkens the solitary figure into shadow and adds a halo of mist and splashes of water at the feet that are absent from the earlier, sunlit version.

Anna Rice Cooke (1853–1934), who founded the Honolulu Museum of Art, became Bartlett's advocate and patron. In 1928, Bartlett helped to found the Honolulu Printmakers along with local artists Alexander Samuel MacLeod, John Melville Kelly, and Huc-Mazelet Luquiens. During his twenty-three years in Hawaii, Bartlett produced more than ninety woodblocks and etchings, though only three of these were Hawaiian-themed woodblock designs, alongside about ten hand-coloured etchings.Charles Bartlett died in Hawaii at the age of 79 on 16 April 1940. Most of the blocks Watanabe had used for Bartlett's prints were destroyed in the 1923 Great Kantō earthquake; on his wife's instructions, the surviving blocks were defaced after his death to prevent further printing.

== Collections and exhibitions ==
The Bradford Museums and Galleries (West Yorkshire, UK), the Bristol City Museum and Art Gallery (Bristol, England), the Cleveland Museum of Art, the Honolulu Museum of Art, the Library of Congress (Washington, D. C.), and the Jordan Schnitzer Museum of Art (University of Oregon) are among the public collections holding work by Charles W. Bartlett.

The Honolulu Museum of Art holds a large collection of Charles Bartlett's paintings and prints, and has held eight solo exhibitions of his work:

- Charles W. Bartlett: Watercolors, Oils and Prints, 30 May 1939 – 11 June 1939
- Retrospective Exhibition of Paintings and Sketches by Charles W. Bartlett (1860–1940), 5 February 1946 – 3 March 1946
- A Printmaker in Paradise: The Art and Life of Charles W. Bartlett, 15 November 2001 – 6 January 2002
- Charles Bartlett's Visions of India, 30 April 2009 – 31 January 2010
- Bartlett in Hawaiʻi, 7 May 2009 – 13 September 2009
- Bartlett in China, 16 July 2009 – 1 November 2009
- Bartlett in Europe, 17 September 2009 – 17 January 2010
- Bartlett in Java and Ceylon, 28 January 2010 – 6 June 2010
