= Madge Tennent =

British-born American artist (1889–1972)

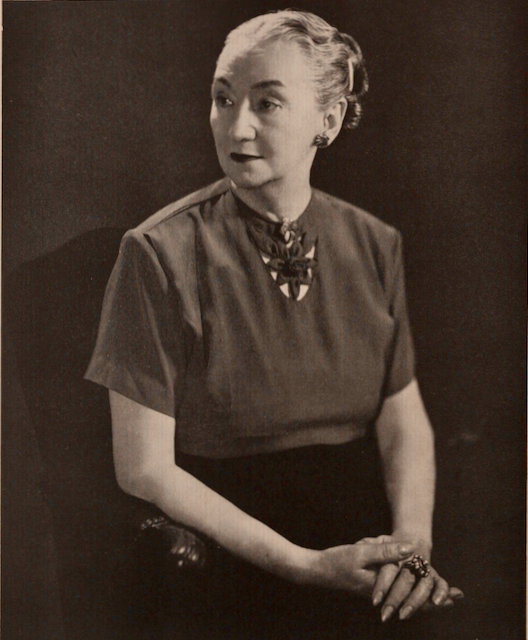
- Madge Tennent, 1948
- Born: Madeline Grace Cook; June 22, 1889; Dulwich, London, England
- Died: February 5, 1972 (aged 82); Honolulu, Hawaiʻi
- Education: Cape Town School of Art, Académie Julian, William-Adolphe Bouguereau
- Known for: Painting, drawing, printmaking, sculpture
- Movement: Hawaiian Modernism
- Spouses: Bertie Phillips Denham (m. 1909; div. 1914) Hugh Cowper Tennent OBE (m. 1915; died 1967)
- Children: 2

Madge Tennent (née Madeline Grace Cook; June 22, 1889 – February 5, 1972) was a British-born American artist known for her monumental oil paintings of Native Hawaiian women. Born in Dulwich, London, raised in Cape Town, and trained at the Académie Julian in Paris under William-Adolphe Bouguereau, she settled in Honolulu in 1923 and devoted the remaining five decades of her career to Hawaiian subjects.

Tennent's signature works are large-scale canvases depicting Hawaiian women in sweeping, architectonic compositions suffused with vibrant color. Drawing on her academic training and the formal innovations of Post-Impressionism, she developed a distinctive style that synthesized European modernist techniques with a deep engagement with Hawaiian culture and people. Her output evolved continuously, from early portraits indebted to Renoir and Cézanne, through the monumental polychromatic oils of the mid-1930s, to the restrained, near-monochrome canvases of the 1940s.

During the 1930s, Tennent exhibited to critical acclaim in London, New York, San Francisco, and Paris, including exhibitions at the Wertheim Gallery in London (1935, 1937) and representation at the 1939 New York World's Fair. At the time of her death, many critics considered her the most important individual contributor to Hawaiian art in the 20th century. Her works are held by the Honolulu Museum of Art, the Fine Arts Museums of San Francisco, the Victoria and Albert Museum, and the National Museum of Women in the Arts, among other institutions.

== Biography ==
=== Early life ===
Madge Tennent was born Madeline Grace Cook in Dulwich, London, the first of two daughters of Arthur and Agnes Cook. Her father was an architect, seascape painter, and fine craftsman in woodcarving, while her mother owned, edited, and wrote for a weekly magazine titled South African Women in Council. By 1894, the family had settled in Cape Town, where the Cooks took a lively interest in comparative religion and matters of psychic and astrological inquiry. Madge and her sister Violet were raised in this stimulating environment, learning to read and write at an early age. Agnes was an accomplished pianist who taught Madge to play. Her parents' efforts to promote tolerance among various races and creeds left a lasting impression on their elder daughter.

=== Paris (1902–1906) ===
Although she had attended an English boarding school and, later, a French convent school in Paris, Madge had little formal general education. Her aptitude for drawing prompted her parents to enroll her at the age of twelve in the Cape Town School of Art, where classes were limited to drawing from casts, still life, and portraiture; within a year, she had mastered and surpassed the curriculum. The family relocated to Paris so that she could pursue more advanced training.

At the Académie Julian, she attracted early attention for her skill and was invited to study under William-Adolphe Bouguereau, a prominent artist-educator closely identified with Academic art. In a competition among students from five academies, the thirteen-year-old placed fifth with a full-length charcoal drawing of a nude model. She worked long hours each day, and with her family she frequently visited the Louvre, where she measured her progress against the old masters.

=== Return to Cape Town and early career (1907–1915) ===
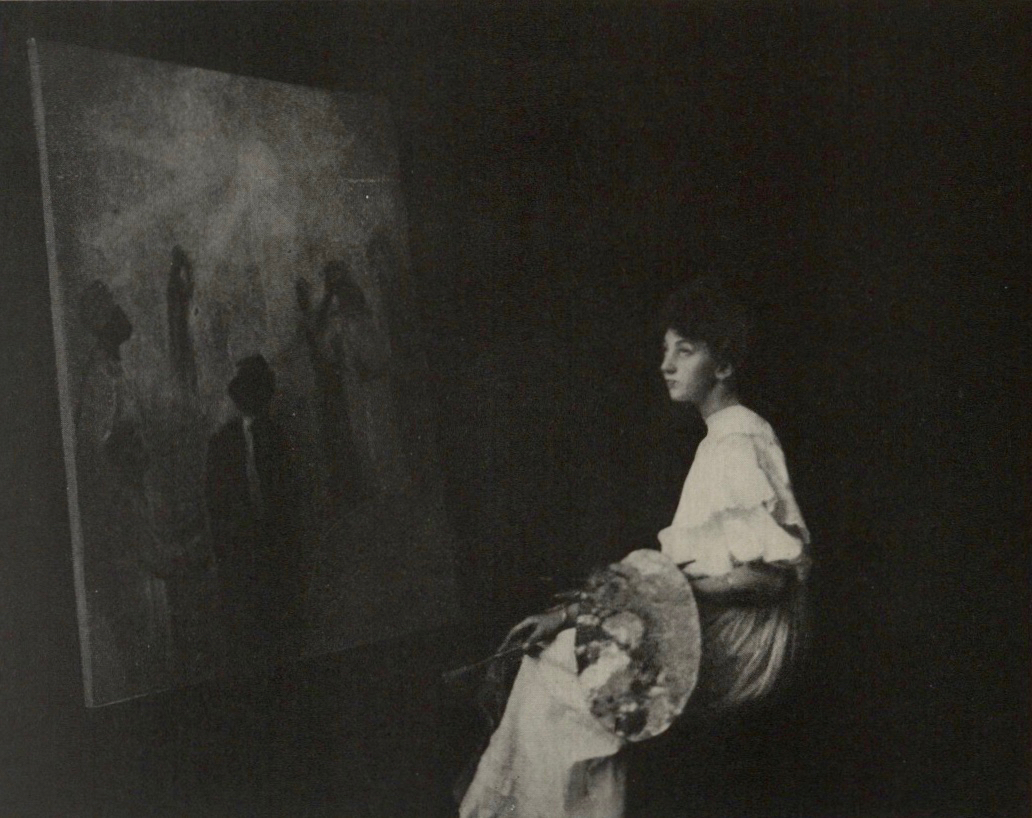
Tennent in her Cape Town studio, c. 1914

The Cooks had been immersed in the cultural life of Paris, but financial reverses forced their return to Cape Town in 1907. Madge was soon appointed headmistress in art for several girls' schools in different cities of South Africa and director of a government art school in Cape Town. At eighteen, she began exhibiting her work widely. In response to one such exhibition, a critic observed, "One must be a mystic to recognize the meaning with which the pictures are invested."

In 1909, Madge married Bertie Phillips Denham; the marriage ended in divorce by 1914. By 1913, she had established her own art school and resumed her piano recitals. Attending one was Hugh Cowper Tennent, a chartered accountant from New Zealand who was stationed in Cape Town with the Natal Light Horse regiment. One of eleven children of Robert and Emily Tennent, Hugh courted the 26-year-old Madge for three months following their introduction. The two were married on July 25, 1915, and shortly thereafter embarked for New Zealand.

=== New Zealand and British Samoa (1915–1923) ===
In New Zealand, Tennent was appointed head instructor at the Government School of Art in Woodville, where the couple lived while Hugh awaited further military orders. On June 11, 1916, she gave birth to Arthur Hugh Cowper Tennent, the first of two sons. When orders came, Hugh was posted to France in support of the Allied effort in World War I. Tennent relocated with her infant to the home of Hugh's parents in Invercargill for the duration of his service abroad.

Hugh returned from France in 1917 with a badly wounded arm. An accountant by trade, he was offered a position as treasurer to the government of British Samoa, which he accepted. The Tennents lived in Samoa for six years, during which time Tennent was drawn to the Polynesian people and devoted much of her time to drawing charcoal portraits of Samoans. The experience planted the seeds of what would become her life's artistic preoccupation. Midway through the family's six years in Samoa, an extended holiday in Australia allowed her to study for a few months under the painter Julian Ashton, who directed his own school of art in Sydney.

=== Honolulu (1923–1972) ===
In 1923, en route to England to enroll their sons in school, the Tennents stopped over in Honolulu. (Note: The Tennents arrived in Honolulu on November 14, 1923.) What was intended as a brief visit became permanent: the couple were persuaded by members of the local cultural elite, including the poet Don Blanding, to stay. Tennent was immediately captivated by the Hawaiian people, and she would devote the remainder of her life to rendering them in her art. Hugh established a chartered accountancy practice in the city.

During her first years in Honolulu, Tennent supported her family as a portrait painter, producing commissioned likenesses of children and adults, mainly from Caucasian families. This commercial work gave way in the late 1920s to the paintings of Native Hawaiian and multiracial subjects for which she became known. She became closely associated with the Honolulu Academy of Arts (now the Honolulu Museum of Art), where she was a frequent lecturer and participant in group exhibitions from the institution's early years.

By the mid-1930s, Tennent had established an international exhibition career, sending paintings to major shows in London, Paris, New York, San Francisco, and Los Angeles. Her 1935 and 1937 exhibitions at the Wertheim Gallery in London brought her critical attention in Europe, and Local Color (1934) was selected to represent Hawaiʻi at the 1939 New York World's Fair.

During the mid-1950s, Tennent suffered the first of several heart attacks, prompting her to shift from large-scale work on canvas to smaller pieces on paper. She was diagnosed with a permanent heart ailment in 1958, and by 1965 she had largely discontinued working and moved into Maunalani Hospital near Mānoa. Her husband Hugh died in 1967. She died in Honolulu on February 5, 1972, at the age of eighty-two. Her funeral was held at St. Andrew's Cathedral.

== Art and style ==
Stimulated by the pure colour flourishes of van Gogh, the ice and fire of Cézanne, and the opalescent, jewelled, flower-tinted harmonies of Renoir, this experience of experimentation in colour was a joyous one for me, though it was often the reverse for onlookers, many of whom prophesied a dire aesthetic end for me as an artist.

— Madge Tennent, Autobiography

Olympia of Hawaii (with Apologies to Manet), c. 1927, Honolulu Museum of Art

Three Hawaiian Women, 1941, Honolulu Museum of Art

During her early years in Honolulu, Tennent worked primarily as a portrait painter for the city's Caucasian families. Although this commercial work was financially successful, her imagination was already engaged with the Native Hawaiian and multiracial people she longed to portray. Influences of European antecedents — Manet, Renoir, Cézanne — permeated her transitional paintings of the late 1920s and early 1930s: Bathers (1926), Hawaiian Girl (1926), Girl with Apples (1926), Makuahine (1927), and Olympia of Hawaii (with Apologies to Manet) (1927). Olympia of Hawaii, in the collection of the Honolulu Museum of Art, exemplifies Tennent's early engagement with vivid color and her adaptation of line and form to the bright, warm hues of Hawaiʻi.

The majestic, explicitly Polynesian women of Tennent's mature style surfaced in works such as Reclining Girl (1929) and Three Filipino Ladies (1930), which synthesized European modernism's languid, architectonic femininity with her own sustained commitment to Polynesian subjects. Applying paint generously with a palette knife, she avoided sensuousness in the representation of skin texture, instead imbuing her figures with a trademark sense of strength and grandeur, as in Holoku Ball and Hawaiian Singer (early 1930s). As Tennent's canvases grew in ambition, they grew in physical scale; when standard-issue canvas could no longer accommodate her vision, she sewed pieces of canvas together to attain the desired size.

Hawaiians Hanging Holoku, 1934, Isaacs Art Center

By the mid-1930s, Tennent's works had evolved into the large-scale oils of Hawaiian women that remain her hallmark. She tapped a brilliant, decidedly tropical color palette for Hawaiians Hanging Holoku, Lei Queen Fantasia, and Local Color (all 1934), depicting women engaged in lei-making, dancing, and other island traditions. Hawaiian Bride (1935), one of the few paintings with which Tennent was "almost satisfied," marked a turning point in her style; there, as in the concurrent Girl in Red Dress (1935) and Two Lei Sellers (1936), she achieved an ethereal intensity with softer hues and blurred, iridescent forms. In these works, whirling wisps of complementary oils fuse the figures to their floral surroundings, visualizing the bonds that Tennent perceived between the body and spirit of Hawaiʻi. In the summer of 1935, several of these canvases traveled from Honolulu to Europe for a series of exhibitions that established her presence on the international art circuit.

Even the enveloping holoku cannot hide the small wrists, the curled back slender fingers and the columnar arm of even the largest lei woman. Her lifted arms, her wistful smile, the ember-like glow of her sunny flesh, are a perpetual and queenly benediction from one in an honored profession in the Islands possessing the most beautiful people of the world.

— Madge Tennent

Tennent's refusal to feel entirely satisfied with her output, even in the face of widespread acclaim, reflected her conviction that the artist evolves through conscious effort. This conscious evolution became strikingly apparent in the early 1940s, when Tennent's vibrant, swirling colors and thick, granular strokes gave way to a subdued monochrome, as in Three Musicians Subdued in Harmony (1940). Thereafter followed paintings in shades of ocean blues and earthy island sepias on linen, such as Hawaiian Three Graces (1941), Three Hawaiian Women (1941), and Three Hawaiians in a Library (1943). Three Hawaiian Women, in the collection of the Honolulu Museum of Art, demonstrates this stark contrast to the polychromatic blaze of her earlier works and reflects her belief that "every true artist knows that his work must evolve or die. Therefore the moment that he has perfected some type or style of expression peculiar to himself, he must move on or become academic."

Working on a smaller scale in the 1950s, Tennent executed a series of portraits featuring Hawaiian aliʻi in oils, prints, and watercolors; she depicted Hawaiian royalty as figures of heroic proportions and serene countenance, conveying what she called "a gentleness that tends to make a predominance of convex lines, only seen in the great art of the world." Until her death in 1972, Tennent continued to diversify across media and scale, but she never strayed from her Hawaiian subjects.

=== Artistic creed ===
In her 1949 autobiography, Tennent articulated a twelve-point artistic creed summarizing her aims and working principles:

- To make heavy forms lyric.
- To discover fourth-dimensional interest and to make it animate, bringing it down from its imaginative dimensions to a three-dimensional technique in color, form, and rhythm.
- To attempt something profound and universal in a usual and typical Hawaiian subject.
- To organize and paint a big subject as one would conduct a symphony. The two in a last analysis being very much akin.
- To make color perform, where possible, the work of tone.
- To give vibration and coloural movement, as it is in nature.
- To build up color shapes in a three-dimensional painting much as one builds with bricks in a three-dimensional world.
- To make an aesthetic, not a static, expression in paint, and to keep a large organization in paint, lyric.
- To paint each picture in its most suitable rhythm, these rhythms to be a personal expression, used to give a sense of perpetual vibration or motion.
- To compose with light, apart from color, making light as important as color.
- To achieve through a fundamental and traditional procedure and a personal technique, in an abstract way (so called), the story of the Hawaiian people.
- To paint without thought of pleasing, to keep faith with my furthest discrimination in art, and to make no compromise aesthetically.

== Exhibitions ==
Local Color (1934) represented Hawaiʻi at the 1939 New York World's Fair

Tennent was a frequent exhibitor with the Honolulu Academy of Arts from its early years, participating in many of the institution's group exhibitions and serving as a regular lecturer. She also sent paintings to the mainland United States and to Europe for solo and group exhibitions throughout the 1930s. Selected exhibitions beyond Hawaiʻi include:

- Ferargil Galleries, New York – 1930
- California Palace of the Legion of Honor, San Francisco – 1932
- 12th International Watercolor Exhibition, Art Institute of Chicago – 1932
- Northwest Annual Exhibition, Seattle Art Museum – 1933
- Bernheim-Jeune, Paris – 1935
- Wertheim Gallery, London – 1935 and 1937
- Eighteenth Annual Exhibition Painting & Sculpture, Los Angeles Museum, Exposition Park – 1937
- Second National Exhibition of American Art, American Fine Arts Society Galleries, New York – 1937
- Civic Center, San Francisco – 1938
- Oakland Museum of California Annual – 1938
- Drake Hotel, Chicago – 1939
- Contemporary Art of the United States, New York World's Fair – 1939–1940

== Critical reception ==
Tennent's first London exhibition — Polynesian Mural Paintings and Drawings of Hawaiian Racial Types, shown at the Wertheim Gallery from September 10 to 30, 1935, jointly with paintings by the Swedish artist Inga Courtauld — attracted notices across the British press. The Times described her artistic aim as "colour in movement" and judged that, if she had looked at Renoir, "she has looked at him intelligently and adopted only what could be fused with her exotic subject matter", adding that her studies of Hawaiian racial types "remove any suspicion that the style adopted by Mrs. Tennent in her paintings is due to a shirking of drawing". The Daily Mail saw in her work a blend of "the massive feminine forms of the late Renoir, the palette of Gauguin, and the spottily-thick paint of Monticelli". Other reviewers were less persuaded: the Morning Post found her talents "swamped in the lava-like rush of gaudy pigment" while granting her "considerable skill in draughtsmanship", and Apollo, admiring the shimmering quality of her Monet-inflected impasto, regretted occasional lapses in draftsmanship "the more" because "her drawings show that she can draw". Interviewed during the exhibition, Tennent addressed the comparison that would follow her for the rest of her career: "Please don't think I ape Gauguin—there is only one Gauguin!"

Her 1937 return to the Wertheim Gallery prompted a widely cited review by Eric Newton in the London Evening Standard:

One can see from the exhibition of Miss [sic] Tennent's work at the Wertheim Gallery in Burlington Gardens that it would be the easiest thing in the world for her to draw and paint with careful and literal accuracy and leave it at that. She has the equipment of an exceptionally gifted student, and to prove it she includes one or two drawings of heads done with an academic though masterly touch which gives one no more than the physical features of her sitters. But, luckily, she feels that art has other things to do than hold mirrors up to Nature. It is plain that Honolulu, where she has been working, has set her imagination on fire, and her later paintings are symbolic rather than representational. Vivid prismatic colour and a gargantuan sense of form are the dominant features of her later style. These paintings of native women, not so much massive as fantastically rotund, clad in voluminous draperies of almost painfully intense colour, give one a sense of tropical exuberance. Her exuberance is not confined to paint. In the drawings of this later phase she still seeks to express volume rather than outline. Her art could be described as an experiment in amplitude.

The wider press response was divided, with several reviewers praising Tennent's draftsmanship while balking at the color and scale of the large oils. Jan Gordon, writing in The Observer, described her as painting "Hawaiian scenes with immense gusto" and singled out her pencil drawings as evidence of a "deliberately selective" attitude toward paint. The critic for Apollo conceded that "she can draw" but judged that her "overwhelming love for passionate colour" was carried "too far", and a reviewer for Artist found in her drawings "draughtsmanship of a very high order indeed" while complaining that in the oils she seemed "to go artistically berserk". The most hostile notice came from Gillian Burke in the Dublin Saturday Herald, who pronounced the earlier, more naturalistic Hawaiian work "far superior" to the recent monumental canvases, whose massive figures she dismissed as "crude, gross monsters".

== Legacy ==
Three days after Tennent's death, the Hawaiʻi State Senate adopted Senate Resolution No. 67, commemorating the artist's vision, accomplishments, and influence:

IN HONOR OF THE LATE MADGE TENNENT

WHEREAS, Madge Tennent, one of Hawaii's most important artists, died on February 5, 1972 in the 82nd year of her long and eventful life; and WHEREAS, better than any other artist to date, Madge Tennent was able to capture and honestly express in her many paintings and drawings the subtle charm and quiet grace and dignity of the Hawaiian people; and WHEREAS, Madge Tennent was also a warm and generous person, who gave often and generously of her works to friends and to charity; and WHEREAS, Madge Tennent, having spent a half century in Hawaii, leaves behind a rich legacy of art, which shall forever belong to Hawaii; now, therefore,

BE IT RESOLVED by the Senate of the Sixth Legislature of the State of Hawaii, Regular Session of 1972, that this body solemnly notes the passing of a great artist and person, Madge Tennent, and expresses its deepest sympathy and condolences to her family.

In the visual arts Madge Tennent has no equal among the underappreciated artists of Hawaii. Those of us who salute John Kelley [sic], for instance, as a most graphic delineator of Hawaiian types, cannot compare him to Tennent as an artist, anymore than an aficionado of either, links Gershwin to Wagner.

— Patricia Hartwell, The Cultural Climate

Fellow island artist Isami Doi wrote that Tennent died "still, twenty years ahead of all of us." "Even if the Hawaiians were to vanish as a race, they would live forever in the paintings of Madge Tennent," remarked the Native Hawaiian scholar and author John Dominis Holt. In an extended appreciation, Holt wrote: "No other artist in Hawaiʻi has so consistently and eloquently painted, sketched, and drawn the Hawaiian Woman as has Tennent. In the physical form of a larger Hawaiian woman, she established the basis upon which to build a lasting, universal aesthetic statement. She gave her life effort and her great talent to the elaboration of this vision."

In 2005, Tennent was named one of the 100 most influential contributors to the city of Honolulu. Her large-scale oils on canvas and board have reportedly sold for over $1 million at auction.

=== Posthumous exhibitions ===
Tennent's Hawaiian Pattern (1927) was featured in Encounters with Paradise, a seminal survey of Hawaiʻi art mounted at the Honolulu Museum of Art in 1992. From July 2014 until January 2015, this early work appeared alongside two other Tennent canvases in the museum's Art Deco Hawaiʻi exhibition. In September 2016, the Isaacs Art Center mounted a sweeping retrospective spanning over 40 works from five decades of the artist's career. Titled Rhythm in the Round: The Modernism of Madge Tennent, it was the largest public exhibition of her work since 1976.

=== Collections ===
The Fine Arts Museums of San Francisco, the Hawaii State Art Museum, the Honolulu Museum of Art, the National Museum of Women in the Arts (Washington, D.C.), and the Victoria and Albert Museum (London) are among the public institutions holding works by Tennent. Two Sisters of Old Hawaiʻi, in the collection of the Hawaii State Art Museum, is a characteristic example of her monumental paintings of Hawaiian women. The single largest intact collection of her works resides at the Isaacs Art Center, which in 2005 became caretaker of the Tennent Art Foundation collection.
