= Isaacs Art Center =

Art museum in Waimea, Hawaii, United States

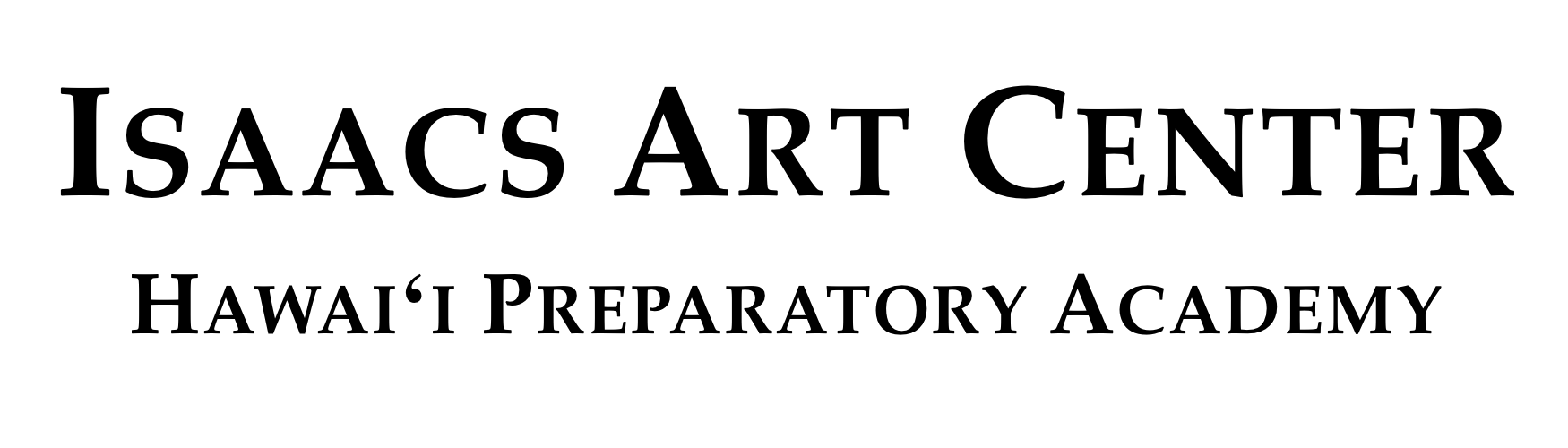

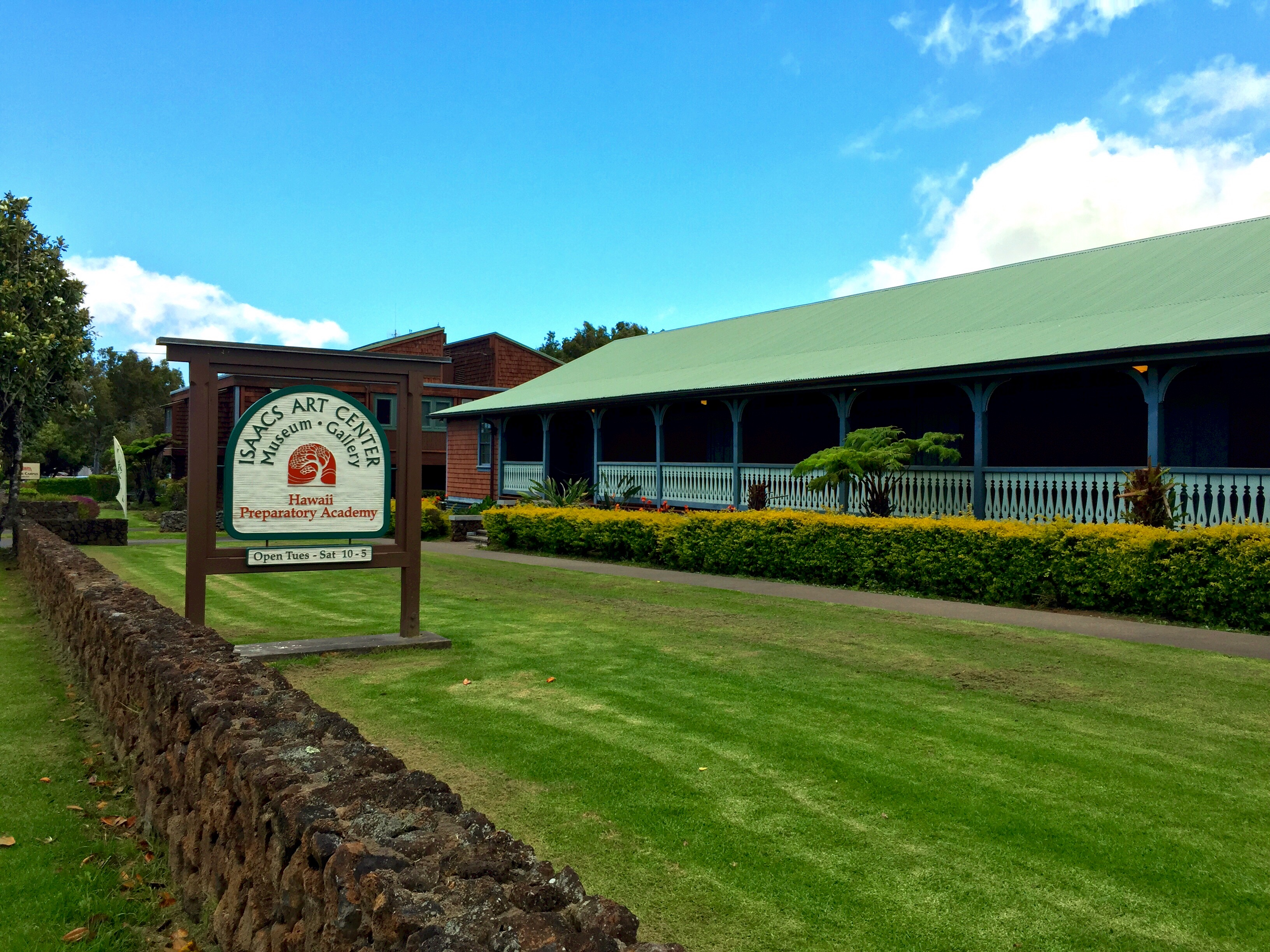
- Exterior view of the Isaacs Art Center
- Established: 2004
- Location: 65-1268 Kawaihae Road Kamuela, HI 96743
- Director: Mollie M. Hustace
- Website: isaacsartcenter.hpa.edu
- Waimea Elementary School
- U.S. National Register of Historic Places
- Location within Hawaii
- Coordinates: 20.0223981°N 155.6732488°W
- Built: 1915
- Architectural style: Hawaiian plantation
- Restored: June 2002 - March 2004
- NRHP reference No.: 05000541
- Added to NRHP: June 8, 2005
- Hawaii Preparatory Academy

The Isaacs Art Center is an art museum and retail gallery in Waimea on the Island of Hawaii. It is operated by and for the benefit of the Hawaii Preparatory Academy; all proceeds benefit the school's scholarship fund.

In addition to its retail holdings, the center houses an expansive permanent collection of Hawaiian, Pan-Pacific, and Asian art, including the world's largest intact collection of works by Madge Tennent. Among the many major artists represented are Jean Charlot, D. Howard Hitchcock, Herb Kawainui Kane, Huc-Mazelet Luquiens, Ben Norris, Louis Pohl, Horatio Nelson Poole, Lloyd Sexton, Jr., Jules Tavernier, and Lionel Walden.

== Building history ==
=== Schoolhouse ===
The 5,580-square-foot (518 m^{2}) building was constructed in 1915 as the Waimea Elementary School. At its completion, the structure was the first public school in the historic ranching community of Waimea and among the earliest schoolhouses built in the Hawaiian plantation style. Locally, its size reflects the gradual increase in population that Waimea experienced in the early 20th century; nationally, a civic trend toward standardized American education.

The original architect and contractor responsible for the schoolhouse remain unknown. In 1916, it welcomed its first students, most of them the children of Parker Ranch employees.

=== Military hospital ===
Between 1942 and 1946, the Waimea Elementary School served as a makeshift field hospital for United States Marine Corps troops stationed in or around Waimea. At the war's peak, the region was host to approximately 30,000 G.I.s operating out of Camp Tarawa; many would later contribute to major campaigns on Iwo Jima and Okinawa, two decisive installments in the Pacific theatre.

=== Restoration and conversion ===
It was restored between 2002 and 2004, with George Isaacs being the major donor. In 2003, the Historic Hawaii Foundation accorded a Historic Preservation Honor Award to the completed restoration; the building itself was placed on the National Register of Historic Places in 2005. The museum opened in 2004.

== Collection ==
The Isaacs Art Center's installations intermix its own permanent art collection with loans from private collectors and works for sale. The art on display consists primarily of paintings by early and mid-twentieth century Hawaii artists.

With the 2005 bestowal of the Tennent Art Foundation's assets, the center became one of the finest public collections of Hawaiian art in the state. This addition to the center's permanent holdings includes approximately 30 oil paintings and 40 works on paper by Madge Tennent. Other Hawaii artists represented in the center's collection include Jean Charlot, D. Howard Hitchcock, Herb Kawainui Kane, Huc-Mazelet Luquiens, Ben Norris, Louis Pohl, Horatio Nelson Poole, Lloyd Sexton, Jules Tavernier, and Lionel Walden.

== Selections from the permanent collection of paintings ==
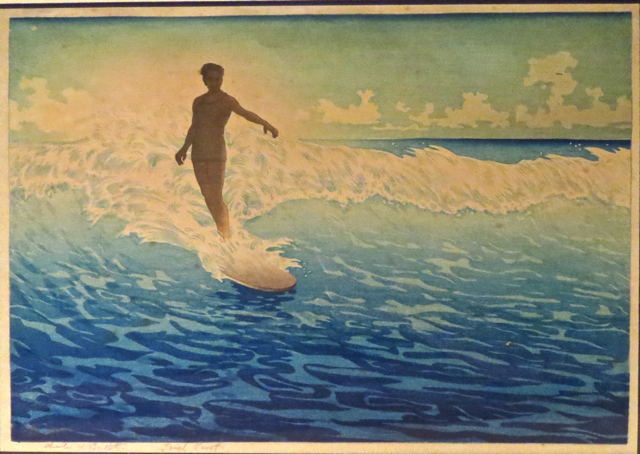
Charles W. Bartlett, Duke Kahanamoku, ca. 1918

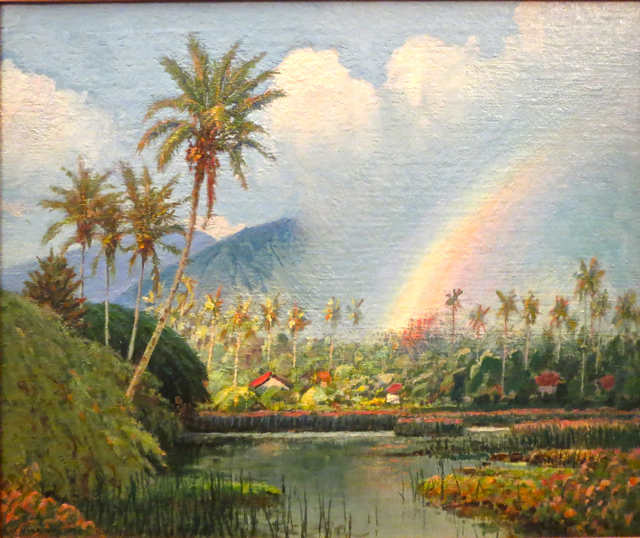
D. Howard Hitchcock, Cottages Amongst the Palms, 1932

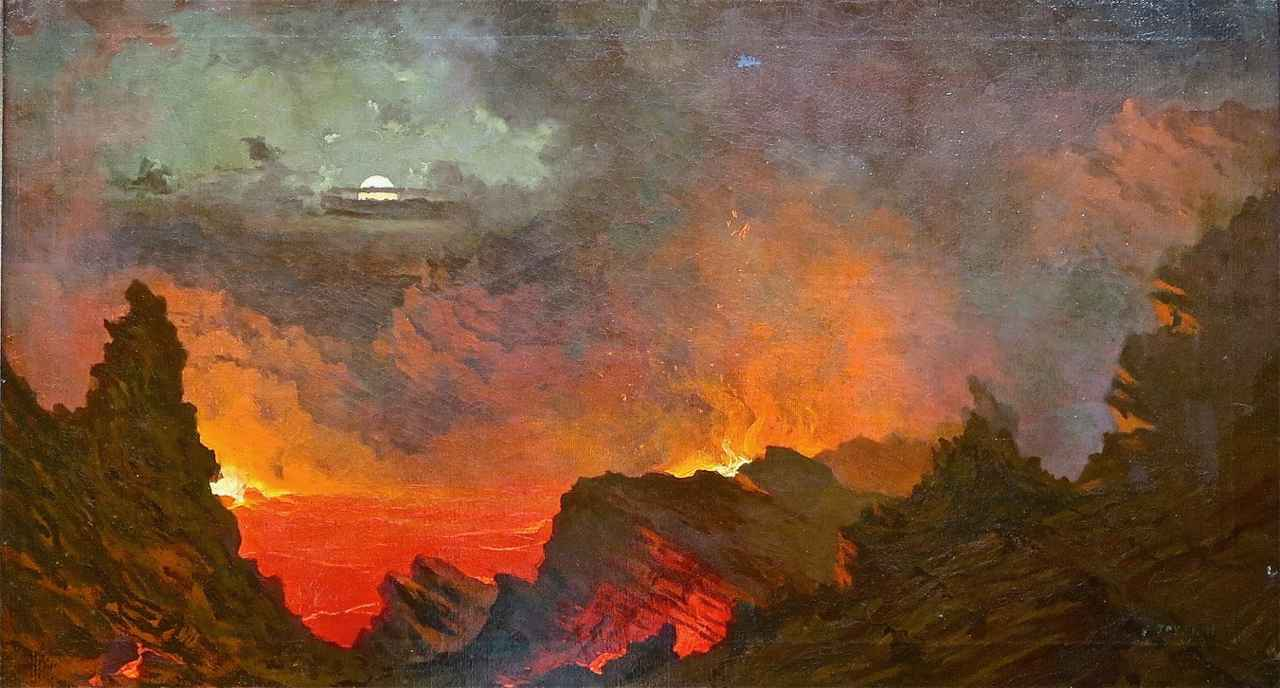
Jules Tavernier, Kilauea by Moonlight, 1889

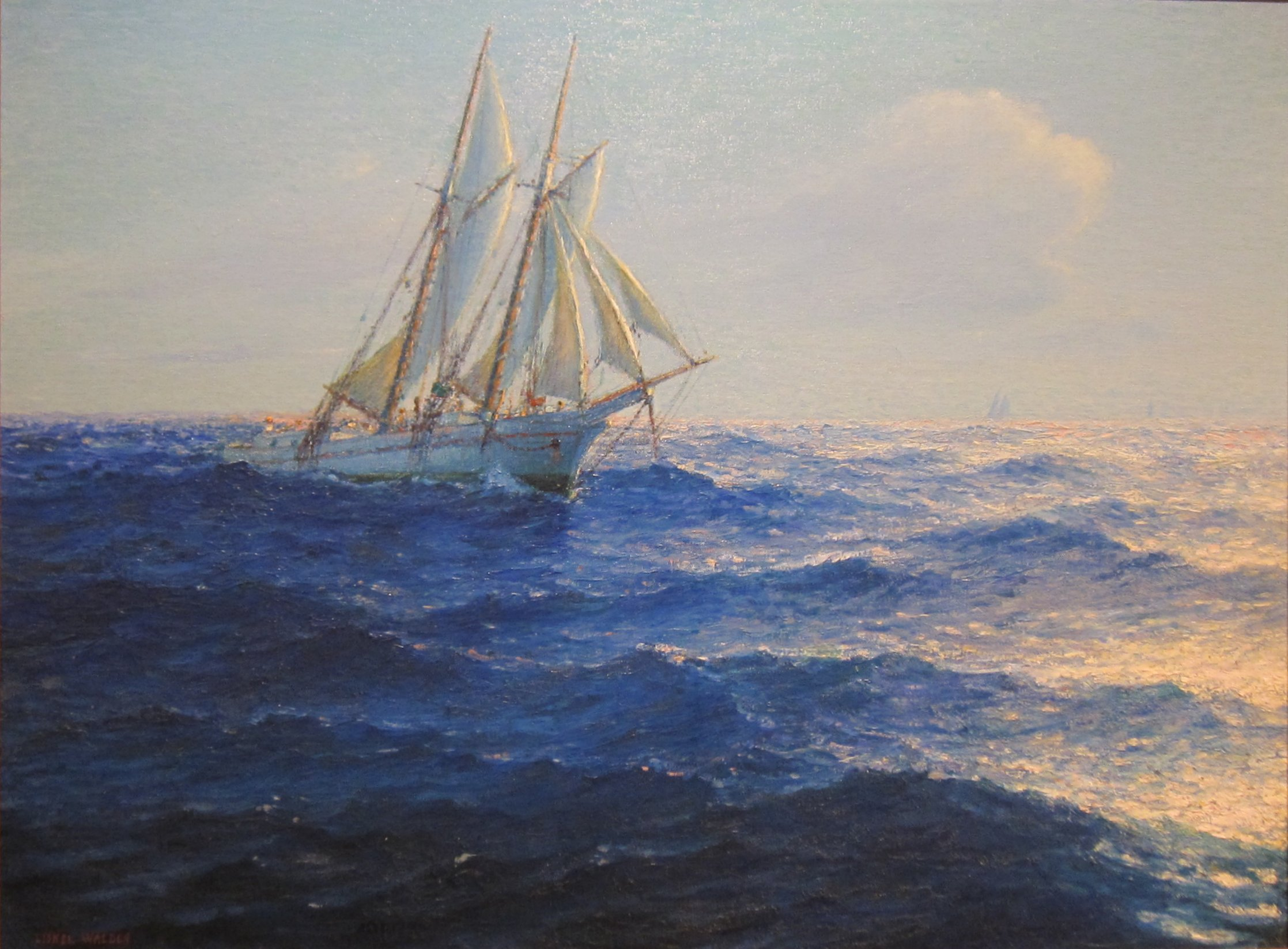
Lionel Walden, Racing Yachts, ca. 1900

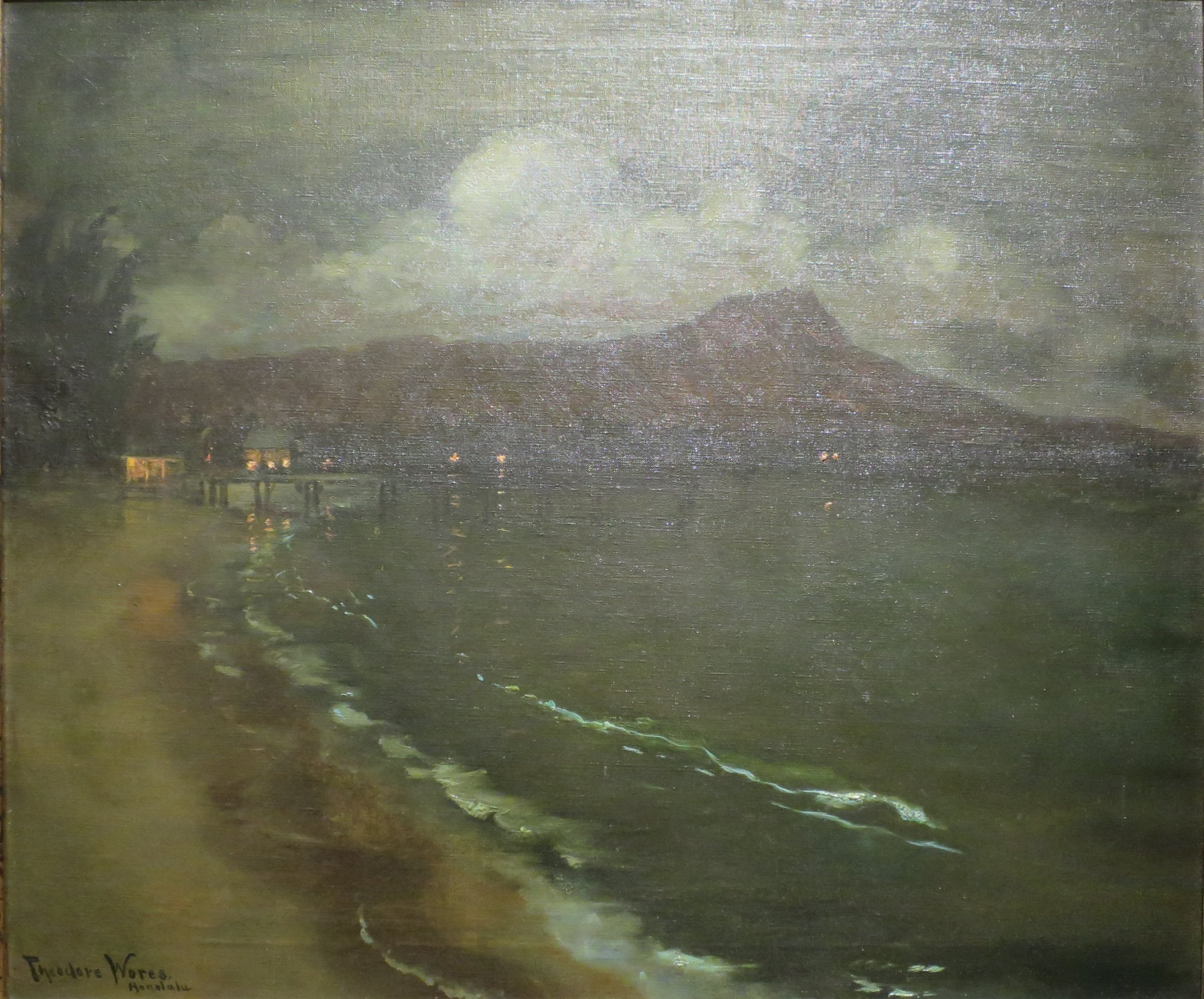
Theodore Wores, Diamond Head by Moonlight, 1902
