= List of artists who sculpted Hawaii and its people =

- Fritz Abplanalp
- Marguerite Louis Blasingame
- Kaili Chun
- Arthur Eriksson
- Marisol Escobar
- Thomas Ridgeway Gould
- Malvina Cornell Hoffman
- Kate Kelly
- Roy King
- Isamu Noguchi
- Marianna Pineda
- Alice Louise Judd Simpich

== See also ==
- Category:Sculptors from Hawaii
- List of artists who made prints of Hawaii and its people
- List of artists who painted Hawaii and its people
