= Herb Kawainui Kāne =

Hawaiian-American artist and historian (1928–2011)

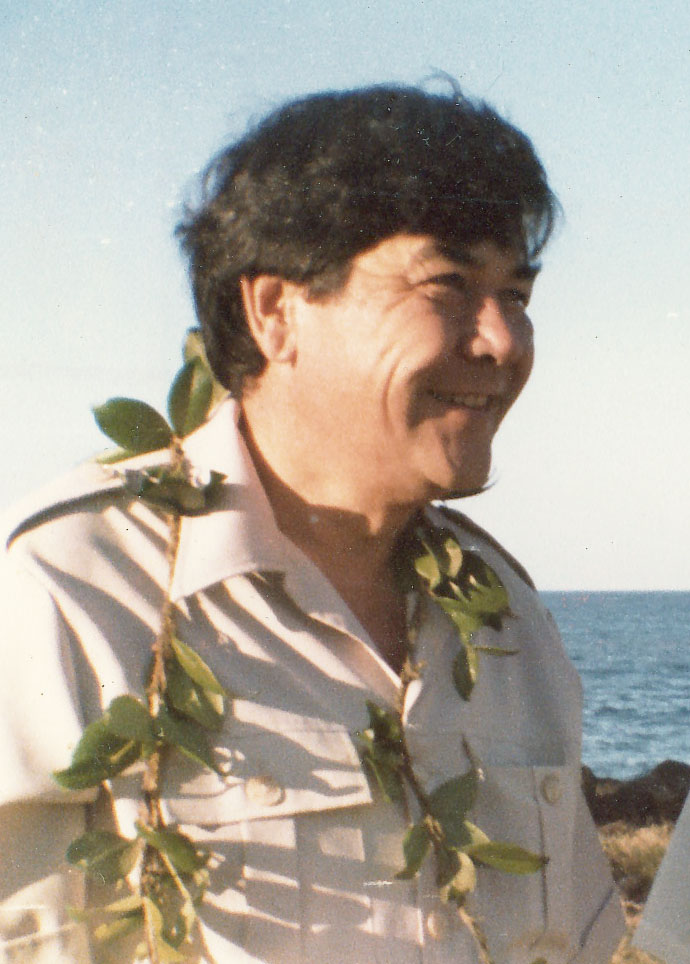
- Born: Herbert Kawainui Kāne; June 21, 1928; Marshfield, Minnesota, U.S.
- Died: March 8, 2011 (aged 82); South Kona, Hawaii, U.S.
- Education: School of the Art Institute of Chicago (BA, MA)
- Occupations: Artist; historian; author; architect
- Known for: Writings about Hawaiian history; paintings; Polynesian Voyaging Society (co-founder); Hōkūleʻa (designer)
- Television: The Wayfinders: A Pacific Odyssey (advisor)
- Board member of: Native Hawaiian Culture & Arts Program, Bishop Museum (founding trustee)
- Awards: Charles Reed Bishop Medal (1998), Living Treasures of Hawai'i (1984)

Herbert Kawainui Kāne (June 21, 1928 – March 8, 2011) was a Hawaiian-American artist and historian. His work was focused largely on the seafaring traditions of the Native Hawaiian people.

Kāne produced artworks depicting Hawaiian culture before European contact and immediately after. The themes of his paintings include war, such as in the painting Battle of Nuʻuanu, and everyday scenes of ceremonial and spiritual life.

== Early life and education ==
Kāne was born in Marshfield, Minnesota. His father worked in the family poi business, became a paniolo, and later traveled across the United States with a Hawaiian band. He also served in the Army, Navy, and eventually worked as an optometrist. Kāne's grandfather immigrated to Waipiʻo Valley from China and built the first poi factory in the Hawaiian Islands, where he cultivated taro and produced poi. Kāne's mother's family were farmers of Danish ancestry in Wisconsin. Kāne spent his childhood moving between Wisconsin and Hawaiʻi.

In his book, Voyagers, Kāne describes an early interest in art. In 1935, as a child in Hilo, Hawaii, his mother took him to an art gallery, which was exhibiting the work of D. Howard Hitchcock. In Hawaiʻi, his father and family passed down the traditional folk tales of the islands.

Kāne later served in the United States Navy, qualifying for veterans' educational benefits under the G.I. Bill. After his discharge, he used these benefits to attend the School of the Art Institute of Chicago, where he earned a bachelor's degree and, in 1953, a master's degree. Under an arrangement between the University of Chicago and the School of the Art Institute of Chicago, his master's degree was awarded by the University of Chicago.

== Early career ==
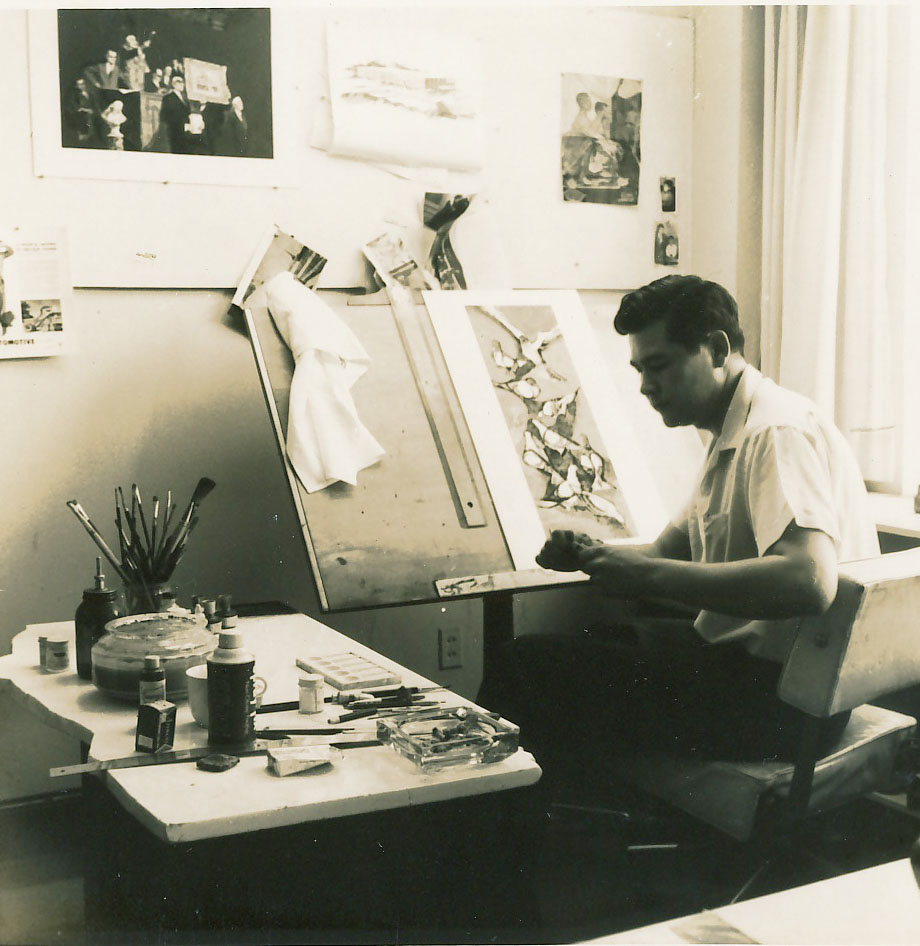
Kāne at work in his Chicago studio

Herb Kāne operated his own advertising studio on Michigan Avenue in Chicago. As a designer, illustrator, and author, he created advertisements for books, magazines, and television. However, Kāne found advertising work unsatisfying, noting that he grew tired of drawing the Jolly Green Giant, even after winning a campaign featuring the character.

While sailing his racing catamaran on Lake Michigan, Kāne began researching Hawaiian canoes at the University of Chicago library and the Field Museum of Natural History. In the 1960s, Kāne created a series of fourteen paintings depicting Polynesian canoes. In 1969, these paintings were purchased by the Hawaiʻi State Foundation on Culture and the Arts. Kāne later stated that this purchase had enabled him to move to Hawaiʻi, where he lived in Honolulu and continued his study of Polynesian voyaging canoes.

== The Hōkūleʻa ==
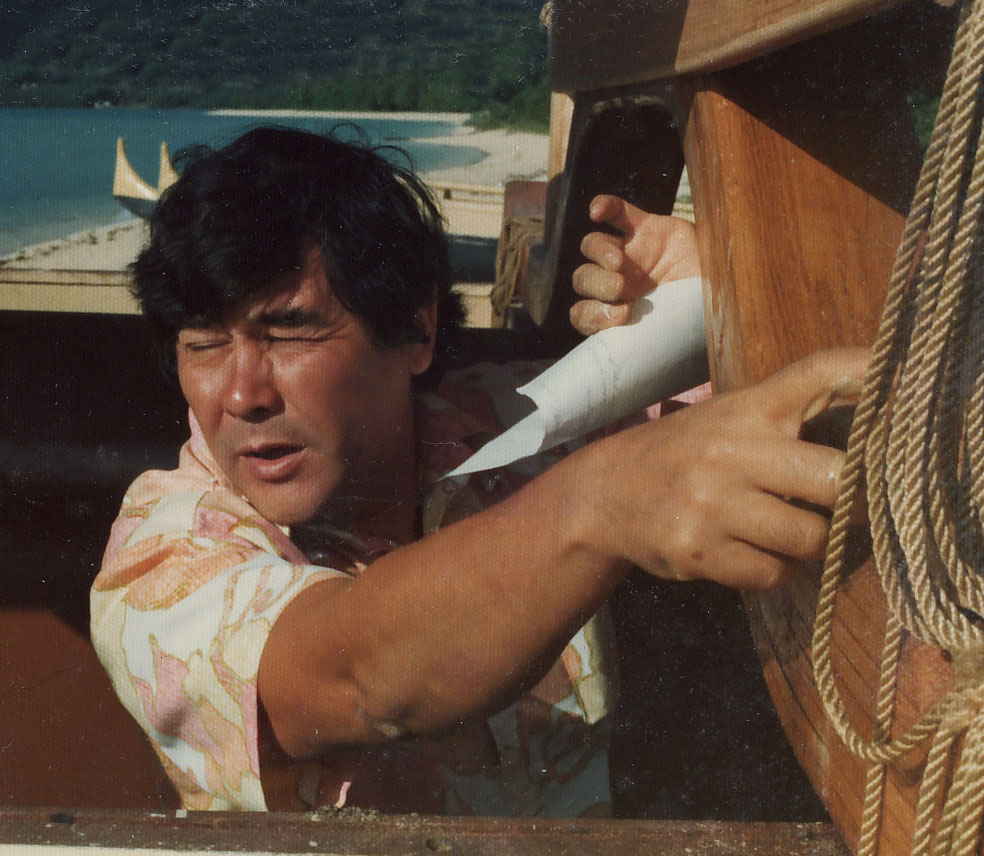
Kāne working on Hōkūleʻa

In Honolulu, Kāne founded the Polynesian Voyaging Society with University of Hawaiʻi anthropologist Ben Finney and author of The Hawaiian Canoe Tommy Holmes. They began working on the Hōkūleʻa, a voyaging canoe that was based on historical Polynesian design, capable of sailing between Hawaiʻi and Tahiti. Their purpose was to demonstrate that ancestral Polynesian voyagers could have navigated in vessels of a similar type to settle Hawaiʻi. Kāne said his goal was also to spur a revival of cultural identity among Hawaiians and Pacific Islanders.

Kāne designed and named the Hōkūleʻa (the Hawaiian term for the star Arcturus). The ship was launched on March 8, 1975. Kāne served as the skipper for two years as the canoe sailed trial cruises among the Hawaiian Islands to attract crew and support for its maiden international voyage.

== Artwork ==
Cook Entering Kealakekua Bay, January 1779, oil on canvas painting by Herb Kawainui Kane, 1994, Isaacs Art Center

Daniel Inouye, United States Senator from Hawaiʻi, stated that Kāne's artwork "captured both ancient and modern-day Hawaiʻi and helped preserve Hawaiʻi's unique culture for future generations." Kāne's work was shown at the Bishop Museum, Hawaiʻi Volcanoes National Park, Puʻukoholā Heiau National Historic Site, and the Hawaiʻi State Capitol. His paintings of Polynesian navigation have been widely reproduced, appearing as illustrations in books and articles. Among the first of these was a series of seven paintings commissioned by National Geographic and published in the December 1974 issue.

Kāne's art depicts historical scenes including voyaging canoes, battles, everyday domestic life, and ceremonial occasions. Kāne also sometimes portrayed Hawaiian legends, spirituality, and mythology, as seen for example in his painting Pele, Goddess of the Volcano. Standing on display at the Jaggar Museum at Kīlauea, it depicts Pele with fire in her eyes and flowing lava as her hair. Kāne's art was often heavily researched to ensure historical accuracy.

=== Site-specific works ===
Kāne's paintings include several large canvases and murals for hotel lobbies and similar public and commercial spaces. His 1973 mural, made of wool, titled Opening of the Pacific to Man, was designed for a space above the entrance to the Pacific Trade Center in central Honolulu. It measures 11-foot (3.4 m) high and 43-foot (13 m) wide, and depicts voyaging canoes and a central male figure holding a paddle. As a design consultant, Kāne worked on resorts and visitor centers in Hawaiʻi and the South Pacific, as well as a cultural center in Fiji. Kāne was commissioned by the National Park Service in 1976 to paint "Keoua's Arrival", which is on permanent display in the Visitor Center at Puʻukoholā Heiau National Historic Site. Several of his large canvases are on permanent view at the Outrigger Hotel in Waikīkī, Honolulu.

One 1973 site-specific mural was painted on a custom-designed wall as part of a history center under construction (and never completed) at Punaluʻu Beach. The historical mural, titled Ancient Punaluu, Hawaiʻi Island, measured 24-foot (7.3 m) wide by 10-foot (3.0 m) high. The mural shows aliʻi, warriors, and commoners on a black sandbar separating Punaluʻu Bay from a pond, with a thatched ceiling evoking an old Hawaiian shelter. Pebbles and sand at the base of the painting led to real pebbles and sand on the floor of the center."

Installation photo of Ancient Punaluu, Hawaiʻi Island by Herb Kāne

In 1975, the mural survived a tsunami that destroyed the interior of the building. According to Kāne's account on his personal blog, quoting eyewitnesses, the wave left a mud line on the wall except on the mural, which was dry and undamaged. Then, in 2005, the mural was stolen from the site, which was vacant and unfinished. Thieves are believed to have cut out the wall in five sections using a circular saw powered by a portable generator, and in this way, stole the painting, which has never been recovered. Kāne responded by recreating a version of the mural in oil paint on canvas, saying, "Now all the thieves have is a preliminary sketch."

Kāne's last commissioned work was for the Royal Hawaiian Hotel, a wall-sized painting of Kamehameha I's landing in Oʻahu. Though he died before the work was completed, he left instructions stating that Brook Kapūkuniahi Parker should finish the commission. However, the hotel displayed the work as unfinished.

=== Stamps ===
Kāne designed seven postage stamps for the United States Postal Service. His 1984 stamp for the 25th anniversary of the Hawaii Admission Act depicts a double-hulled voyaging canoe, a Pacific golden plover (a migratory bird which winters in Hawaiʻi), and a volcano erupting on the flank of Mauna Loa.

Kāne's 2009 stamp for the state's 50th anniversary depicts a person surfing and people paddling a traditional outrigger canoe, all riding the same wave. Kāne was critical of the typography in the final design, which he felt mistakenly substituted an apostrophe for the ʻokina in the word Hawaiʻi. He also designed stamps for several Pacific island nations, including French Polynesia, the Federated States of Micronesia, and the Marshall Islands.

=== Three-dimensional art ===
In addition to his paintings, Kāne also produced a limited-edition bronze sculpture and other three-dimensional works besides the Hōkūleʻa. His bronze sculpture, The Young Kamehameha, stands in Wailea, Maui.

== Death and legacy ==
Kāne died on March 8, 2011.

Tony Jones, the president of the School of the Art Institute of Chicago, stated that Kāne had "rewritten the history of the Pacific." Nainoa Thompson, navigator of the Hōkūleʻa, said Kāne "brought pride and culture and inspiration back [to Hawaiian society] through the canoe [...] He is the father of the Hawaiian Renaissance."

== Publications ==
=== As author ===
- Canoes of Polynesia: A Portfolio of Fine Prints from the Original Paintings. Island Heritage. 1974.
- Voyage: The Discovery of Hawaiʻi. Edited by William Knowlton. Island Heritage. 1976.
- Pele: Goddess of Hawaii's Volcanoes. Kawainui Press. 1987. ISBN 9780943357003.
- Voyagers. Edited by Paul Berry. WhaleSong. 1993. ISBN 9780962709517.
- Ancient Hawaiʻi. Kawainui Press. 1997. ISBN 978-0-943357-03-4.

=== As illustrator ===
- Cahill, Emmett (1999). Wageman, Virginia (ed.). The Life and Times of John Young: Confidant and Advisor to Kamehameha the Great. Honolulu: Island Heritage. ISBN 978-0-89610-449-5.
- Nunes, Shiho S. (2001). The Power of the Stone: A Hawaiian Ghost Story. Honolulu: Island Heritage. ISBN 978-0-89610-283-5.
- Christmas Time with Eddie Kamae and the Sons of Hawaiʻi (1977 album cover). Hawaii Sons. HS-4004.
- Voyagers, The First Hawaiians (2009 film by Paul Csige, based on the Kane's book Voyage: The Discovery of Hawaii)

== Honors ==
- 1984—Living Treasure of Hawaiʻi from the Honpa Hongwanji Mission of Hawaii
- 1987—Poʻokela (Champion) for the Year of the Hawaiian celebration
- 1988—Founding trustee of the Bishop Museum Native Hawaiian Culture & Arts Program
- 1998—Charles Reed Bishop Medal from the Bishop Museum
- 2002—Award for excellence from the Hawaiʻi Book Publishers Association
- 2008—Honorary Doctor of Fine Arts from the School of the Art Institute of Chicago
