= Horatio Nelson Poole =

American painter

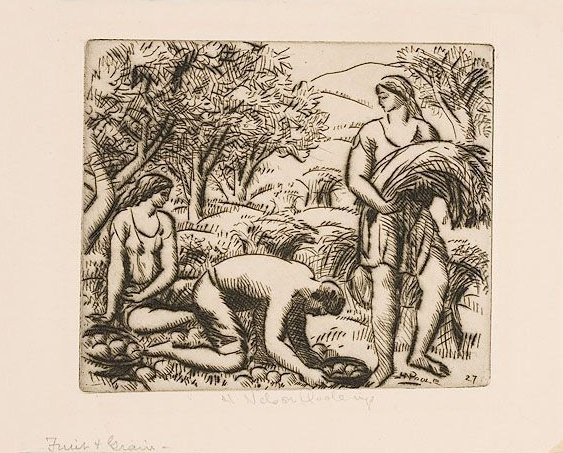
Fruit and Grain, drypoint by Horatio Nelson Poole, 1927

A View of Honolulu near Old Plantation, oil on art board painting by Horatio Nelson Poole, 1916

Horatio Nelson Poole (1884–1949) was an American painter, printmaker, muralist and teacher.

Poole is known for both his intaglio prints (such as Fruit and Grain) and paintings (such as A View of Honolulu near Old Plantation). The Fine Arts Museums of San Francisco, the Honolulu Museum of Art, the Isaacs Art Center (Waimea, Hawaii), Mills College, and the Oakland Museum of California are among the public collections holding work by Horatio Nelson Poole.

== Life ==
Poole was born in Haddonfield, New Jersey on January 16, 1884, but his family moved to Philadelphia when Horatio was ten years old. He studied at the M Street High School, Philadelphia's School of Industrial Design, and then with Thomas Pollock Anshutz at the Pennsylvania Academy of the Fine Arts.

Poole moved to Hawaii in 1914, where he worked as an illustrator for the Pacific Commercial Advertiser and the Honolulu Star-Bulletin. In 1921, he left Hawaii for San Francisco, where he taught at the California School of Fine Arts and at the University of California, Berkeley. He painted a 20-foot mural in San Francisco’s Roosevelt Jr. High School for the Public Works Administration during the 1930s. Poole died in San Francisco July 4, 1949. Horatio's brothers John C. Poole (1887-1926)and Earl L. Poole (1891-1972) were also artists.

== Works ==
- 1916 - A View of Honolulu near Old Plantation, oil on art board
- 1927 - Fruit & Grain, drypoint
- 1929 - Monterey Oak, oil on canvas, Shasta State Historic Park, Shasta County, California
- Various bookplates

Examples of Bookplates by Horatio Nelson Poole

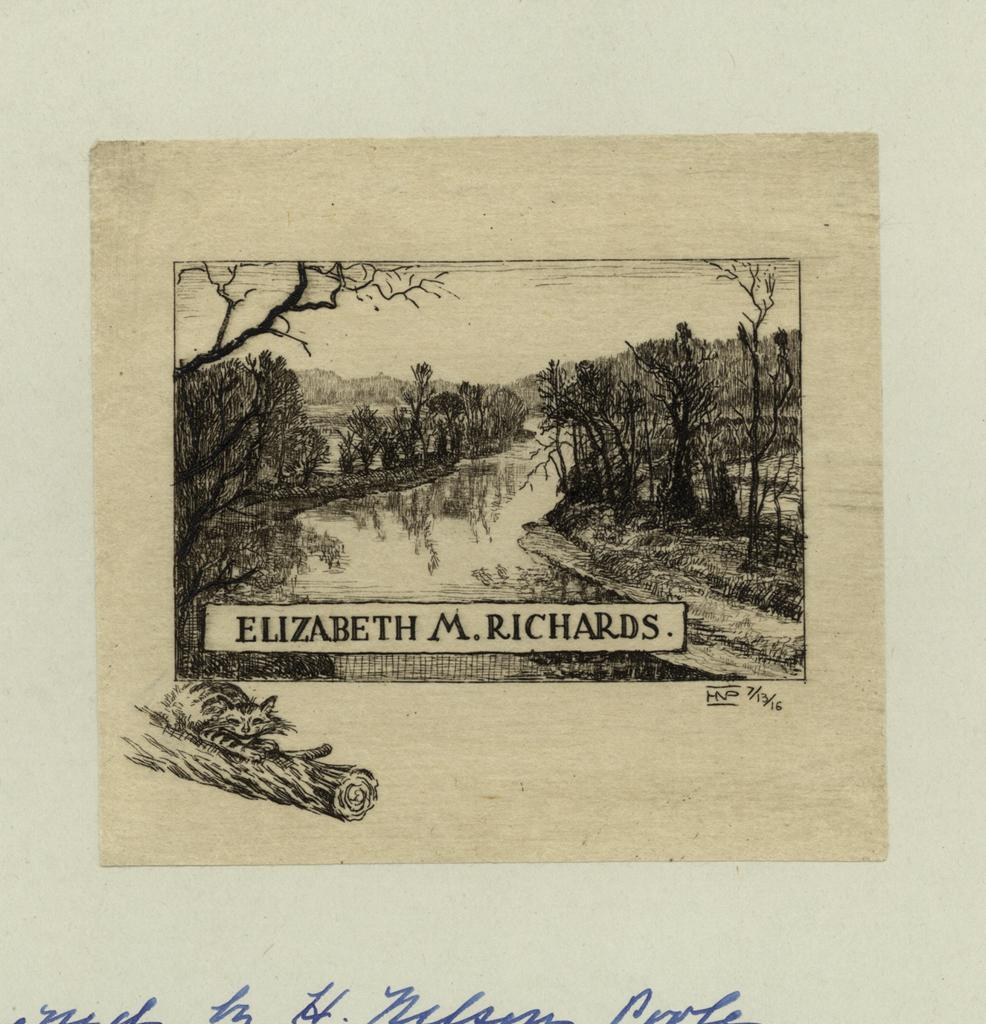

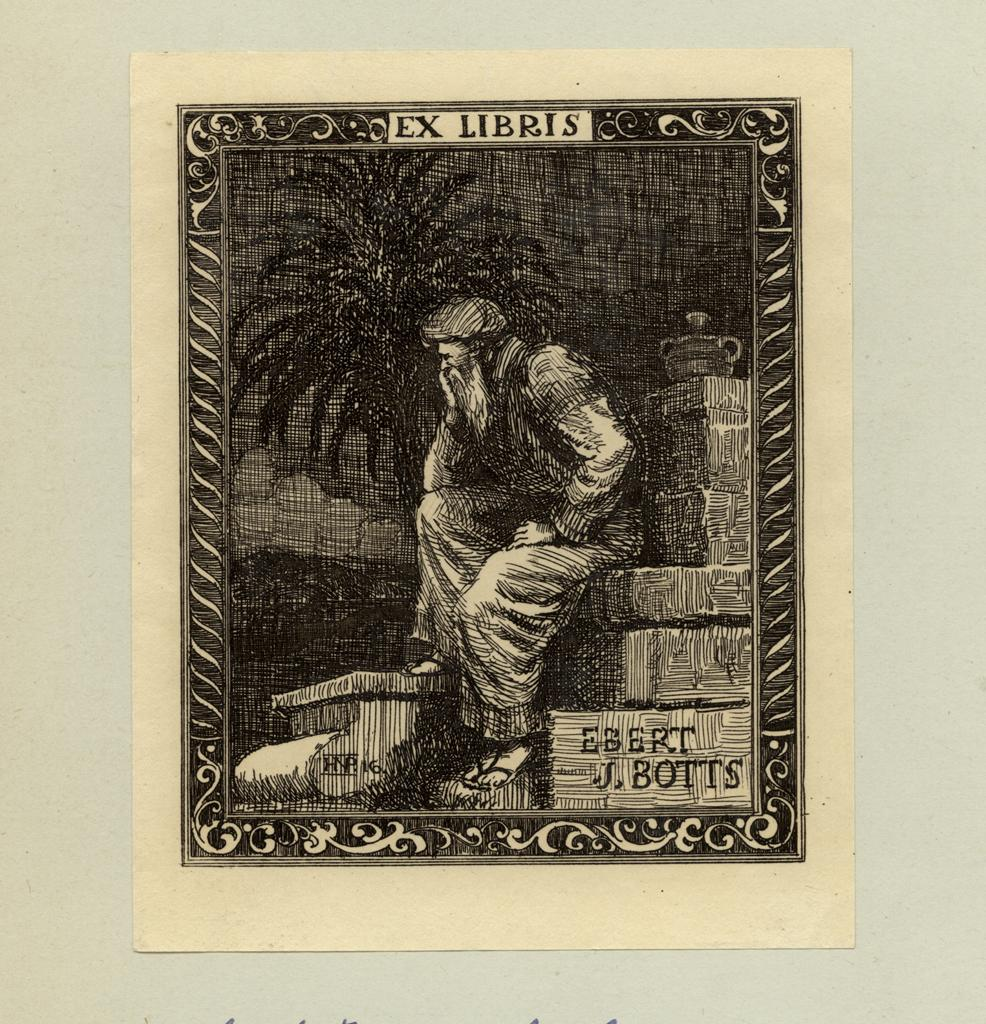

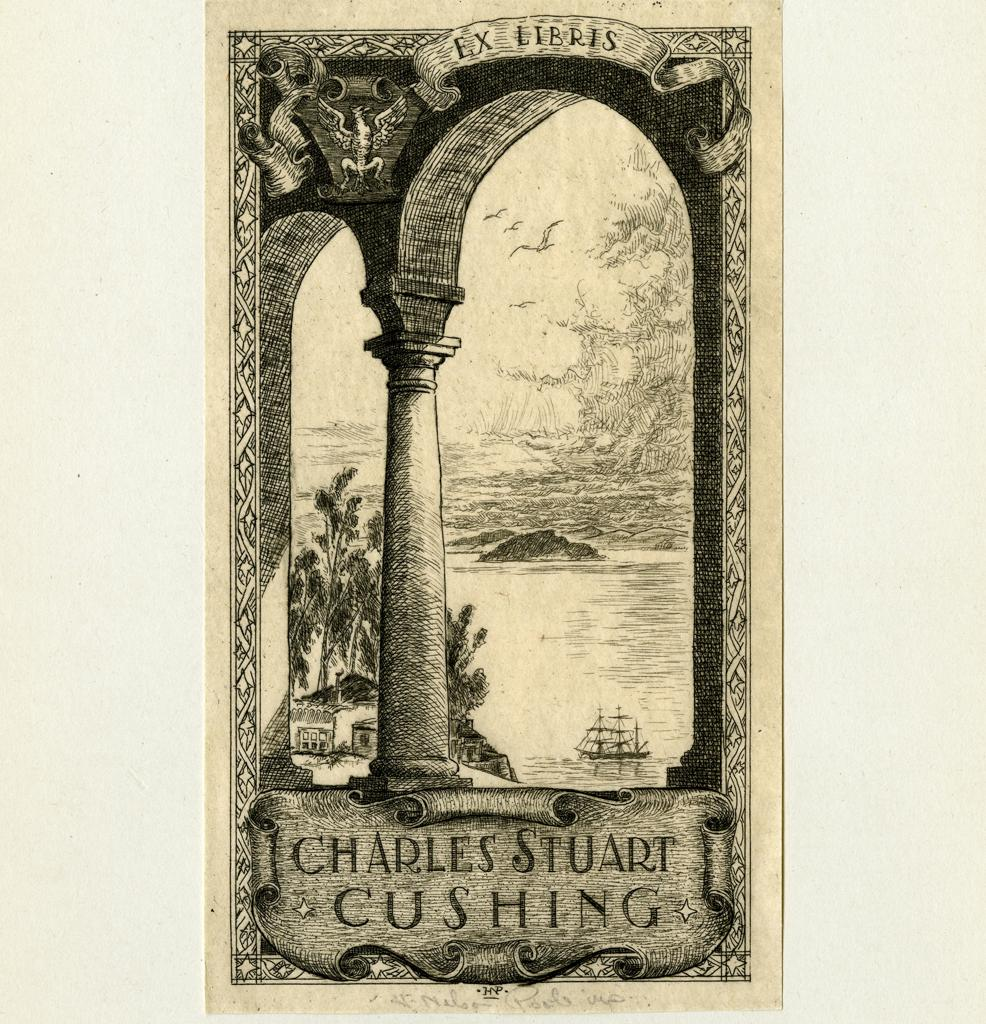
