= Brook Kapūkuniahi Parker =

Brook Kapūkuniahi Parker (born July 31, 1961) is an American kānaka maoli/ʻōiwi (Native Hawaiian) visual artist.

== Early life and family ==
Brook was born in Hawaii, one of six brothers to his father, artist and historian David Parker. He grew up in Kahalu‘u, O‘ahu surrounded by his father's library of books that included Samuel Mānaiakalani Kamakau's; "Ruling Chiefs of Hawaii", David Malo's; "Hawaiian Antiquities" as well as publications from the Church of Jesus Christ of Latter-day Saints. Brook is the great, great-grandson of John Palmer Parker (rancher), founder of the Parker Ranch on the Island of Hawaii and Rachael Keli‘ikipikanekaolohaka Ohiaku, a great-granddaughter of Kamehameha I and Kānekapōlei. From an early age Brook would draw his favorite Hawaiian warriors and cartoon and fantasy characters such as Speed Racer and Conan the Barbarian by artist Frank Frazetta.

In 2010 Brook met Herb Kawainui Kāne and began an e-mail correspondence and critique of his work that has been a significant influence to the artist.
