= Lloyd Sexton Jr. =

American painter

Mokulua, oil on canvas painting by Lloyd Sexton Jr.

Still Life of Magnolias and Mangos, oil on canvas painting by Lloyd Sexton Jr., 1973

Lloyd Sexton Jr. (1912–1990), who is also known as Leo Lloyd Sexton Jr. was an American painter born in Hilo, Hawaii on March 24, 1912. In 1931 he entered the School of the Museum of Fine Arts, Boston. In 1933 he had a show of flower paintings at the Vose Galleries in Boston, followed by exhibitions at the Honolulu Museum of Art and at Gump's in San Francisco. He spent several years in Europe, painting and traveling during the summers and studying at the Slade School of Art in London during the winters. In his third and final year of instruction there, one of his figure paintings won first prize, and in 1936 a flower painting was exhibited the Royal Academy in London. Sexton returned to Hilo in 1937 and concentrated on figure painting and portraiture. That same year his painting "Nanea" was accepted and exhibited at the Royal Academy. Sexton executed a large number of portraits and, beginning in 1934, before he left for Europe, did two commissions for the Hawaiian Pineapple Company. He was a frequent and popular exhibitor in group shows in Honolulu. He also had one-person shows at Honolulu's Grossman-Moody Gallery in 1957 and at the Hilton Hawaiian Village Hotel Gallery in 1961. A retrospective of his work was held at the Contemporary Arts Center, Honolulu Advertiser Gallery, in 1966. He died in Honolulu on March 23, 1990,

Sexton is best known for his depictions of Hawaii's landscapes (such as Mokulua), and Hawaii's flora and fauna (such as Still Life of Magnolias and Mangos). The Honolulu Museum of Art, the Mauna Kea Beach Hotel (Kohala Coast, Hawai'i) and the Isaacs Art Center (Waimea, Hawaii) are among the public collections holding works of Lloyd Sexton Jr.
