= John C. Poole =

John C. Poole (1887-1926) was an American etcher and wood engraver. He was born in Haddonfield, New Jersey in 1887. In addition to creating prints, he worked for the Honolulu Star-Bulletinwhere he became Art Director.

Poole died of cancer in Honolulu on July 29, 1926. John's brother Horatio Nelson Poole (1884–1949) was a painter, printmaker, and muralist who worked primerally in California and Hawaii.

The Honolulu Museum of Art is among the public collections holding works by Poole.

John's wife Alice F. Poole was keeper of the Prints at the Honolulu Academy of Art and a founder of the Honolulu Printmakers.
