= Honolulu Printmakers =

Non-profit organization in Hawaii, US

- Formation: 1928; 98 years ago
- Type: 501(c)(3) Nonprofit
- Headquarters: Honolulu, Oahu, Hawaii, U.S.

Honolulu Printmakers is a 501(c)(3) non-profit organization of Hawaii-based printmaking artists, that operates a printing studio open to the community. It conducts public exhibitions, lectures, demonstration, workshops, and an outreach program in local intermediate and high schools. The organization holds an annual juried print exhibition.

The Honolulu Printmakers was established in 1928 by Charles W. Bartlett, John Melville Kelly, Huc-Mazelet Luquiens and Alexander Samuel MacLeod. It has developed the tradition of the “gift print”, a print commissioned for sale as a fundraiser at the organization’s exhibitions. The 75th anniversary of the organization was celebrated with a retrospective exhibition at the Honolulu Museum of Art and an accompanying catalogue, A Tradition of Gift Prints.

== See also ==
- Honolulu Museum of Art School
