= Lionel Walden =

American painter

Lionel Walden (May 22, 1862–1933) was an American painter active in Hawaii, Cornwall, and France.

== Biography ==
He was born in Norwich, Connecticut, in 1862. He first became interested in art in Minnesota, where the family moved when his father Treadwell became rector of an Episcopal Church there. As a young man, Walden moved to Paris, where he studied painting with Carolus-Duran. In around 1893–97, Walden was in England, living in Falmouth. Paintings of Cardiff in Wales are in museums in Cardiff, Paris, and Abu Dhabi. Walden received medals from the Paris Salon and was made a Knight of the French Legion of Honor. He visited Hawaii in 1911 and several times thereafter. Walden died in Chantilly, France in 1933.

According to David H. Forbes, author of Encounters with Paradise: Views of Hawaii and its People, 1778–1941, Lionel Walden "was the finest seascape painter to work in Hawaii". The Brooklyn Museum, the Henry Art Gallery (University of Washington, Seattle), the Honolulu Museum of Art, the Isaacs Art Center (Waimea, Hawaii), the Musée des Beaux-Arts de Quimper and the Musée d'Orsay are among the public collections holding works by Lionel Walden.

== Notable works ==
The auction record for a painting by Lionel Walden is $73,440. This record was set by Breaking Waves, a 24 by 51.5 inch oil painting on canvas sold March 2, 2007, at Skinner Inc. (Marlborough, Massachusetts).

A painting by Walden, "The Wave" (1908) is since 2015 in the collection of the Musée des Beaux-Arts of Quimper (France), (don d'Elisabeth Willmott et Jean-David Jumeau-Lafond en mémoire de Jean et Jacqueline Jumeau-Lafond).

== Relatives ==
Walden was the brother of Arthur Treadwell Walden.

== Gallery ==
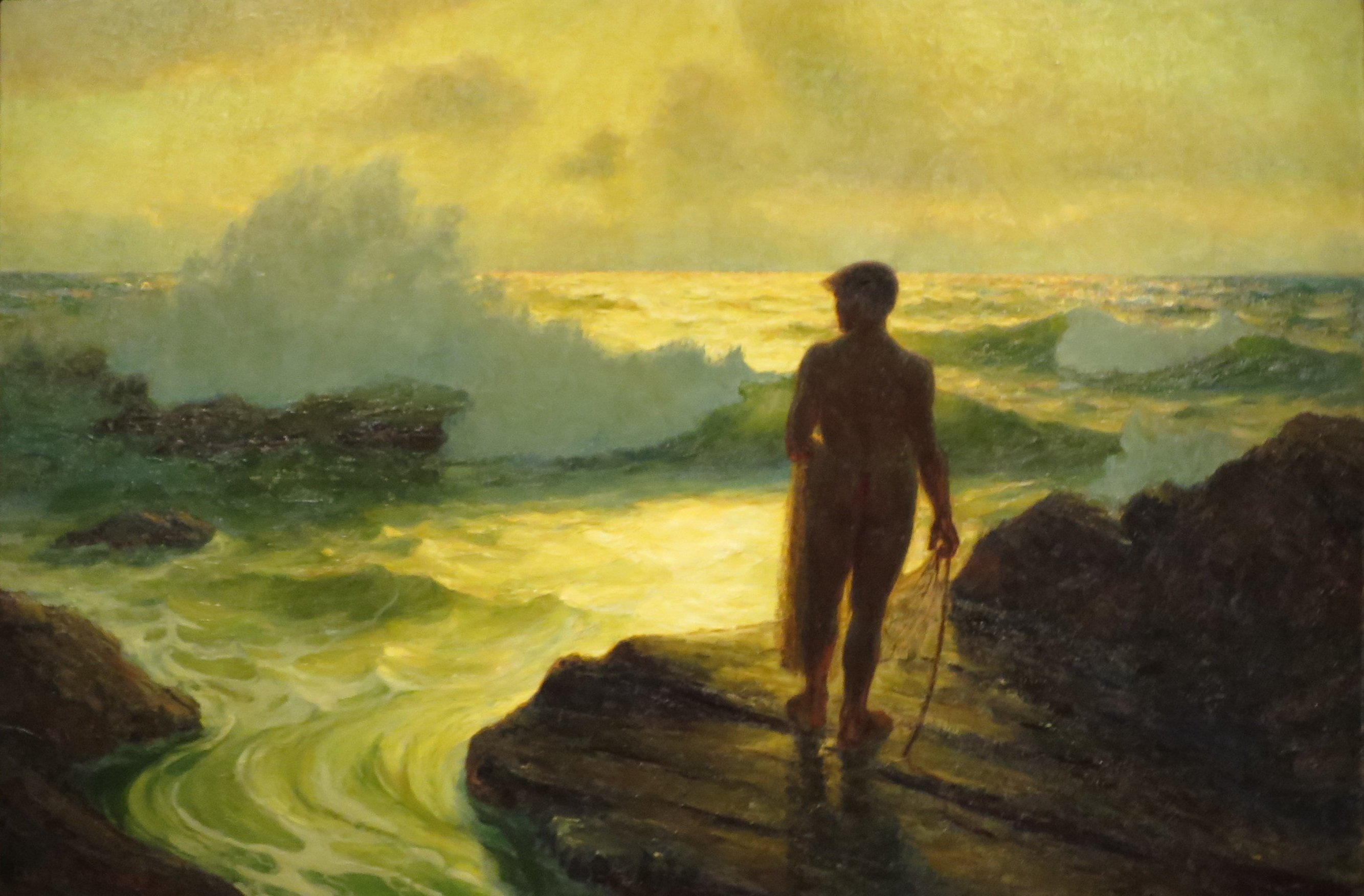
Hawaiian Fisherman, oil on canvas painting by Lionel Walden, 1924, Honolulu Museum of Art

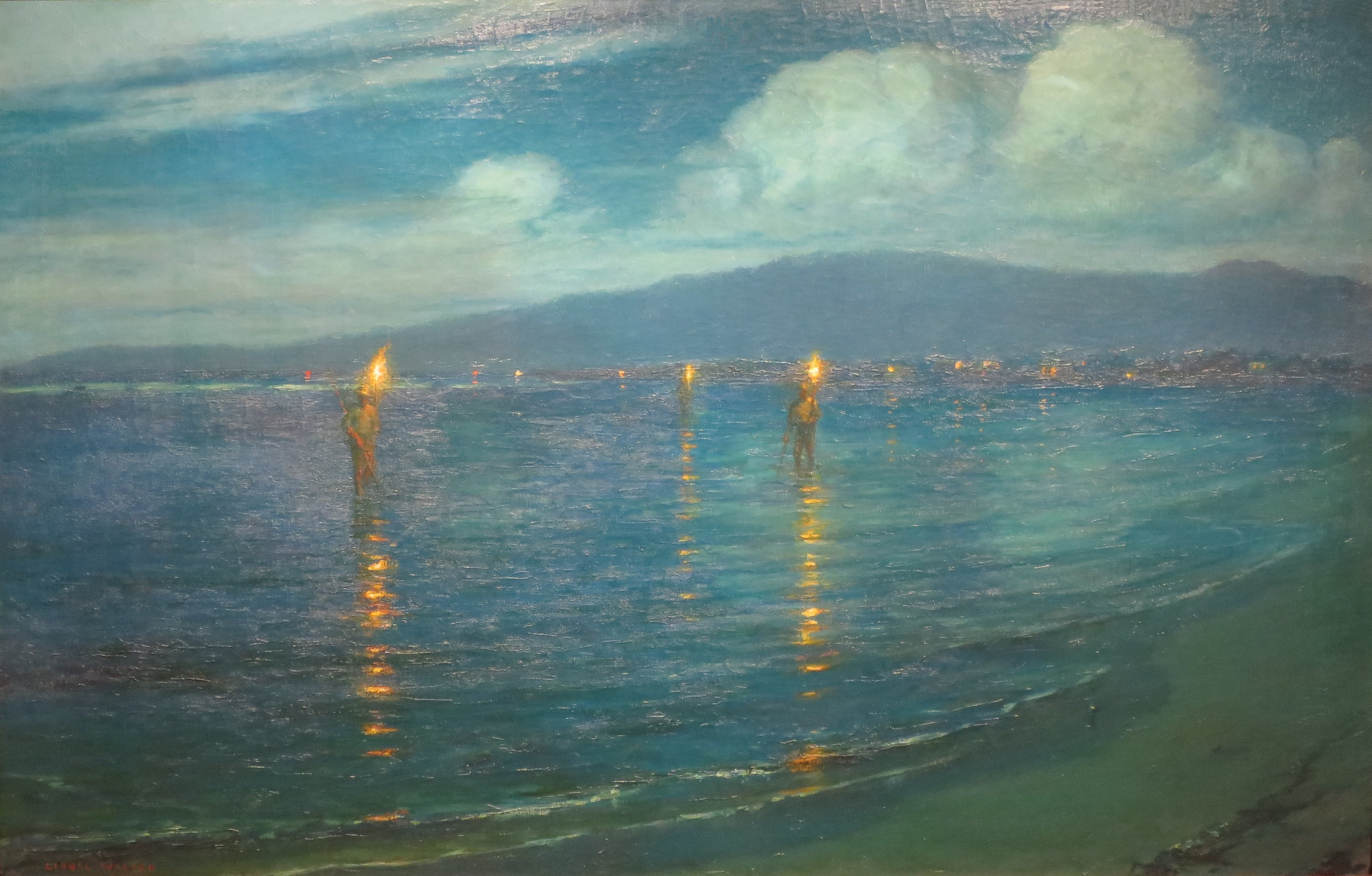
The Torchlight Fishermen, Waikiki, oil on canvas painting by Lionel Walden, c. 1920, Honolulu Museum of Art

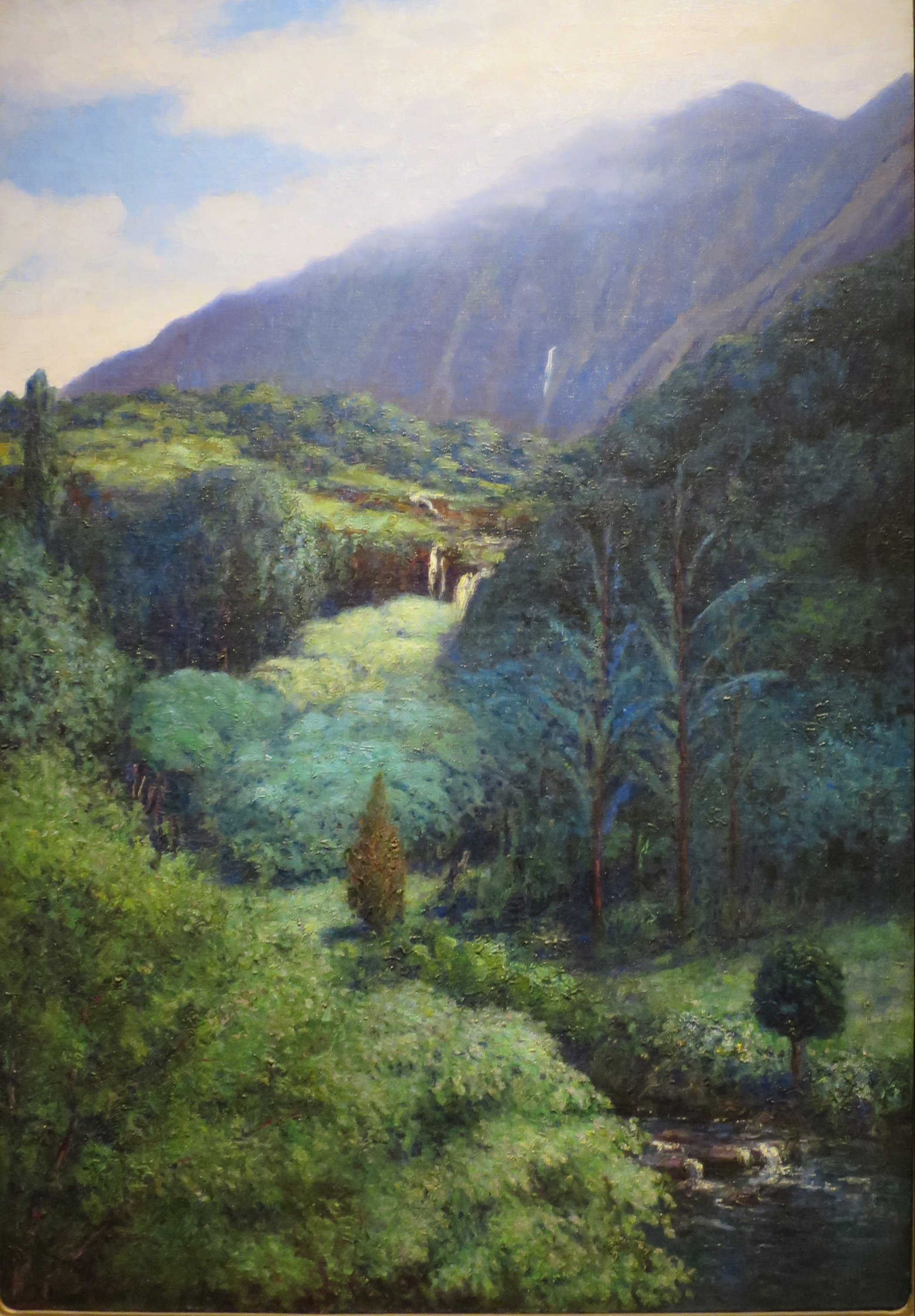
Luakaha, oil on canvas painting by Lionel Walden, c. 1916, Honolulu Museum of Art

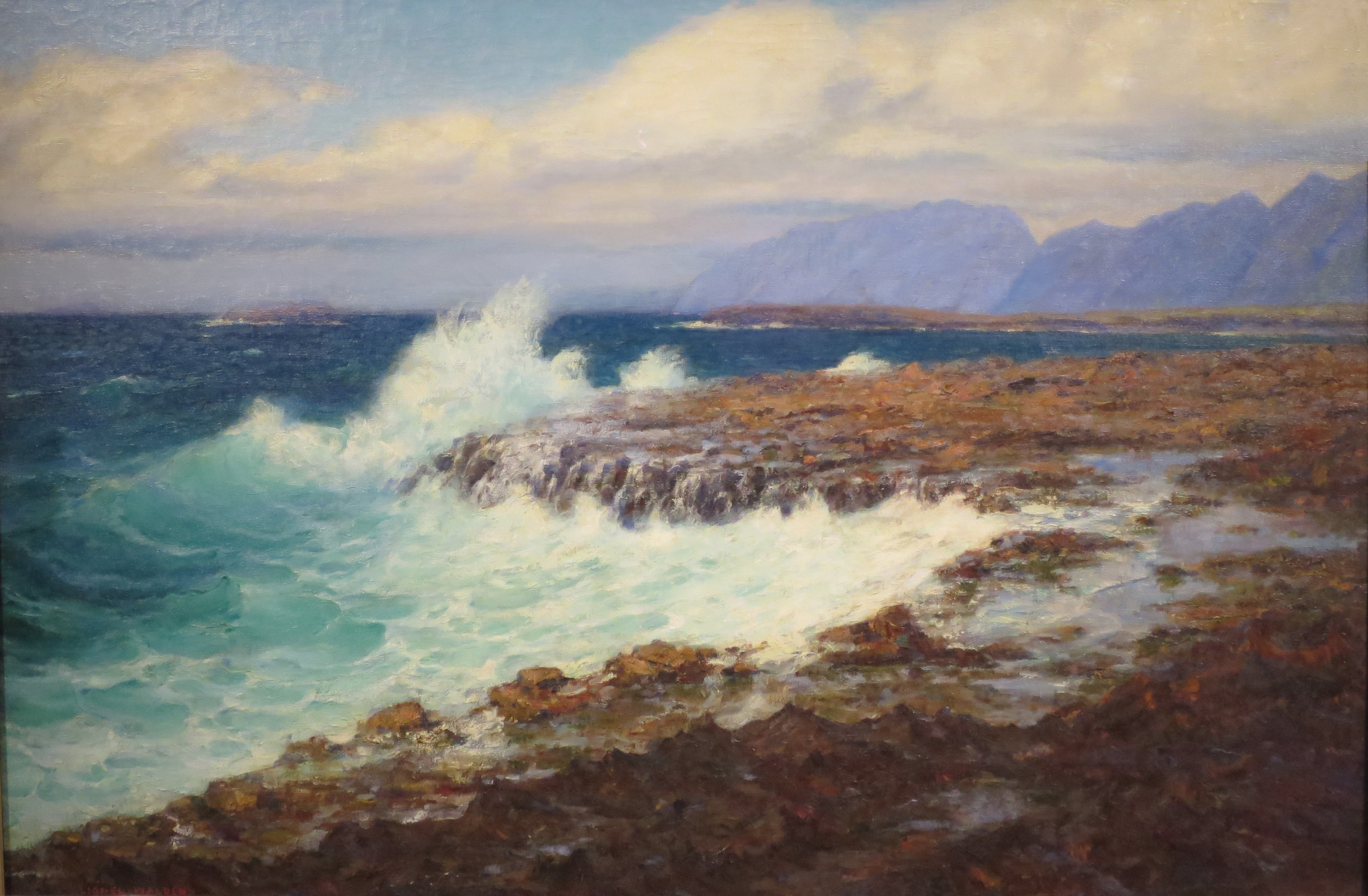
Marine View—Windward Hawaii, ca. 1920, oil on canvas painting by Lionel Walden, 78 x 117 cm., Honolulu Museum of Art

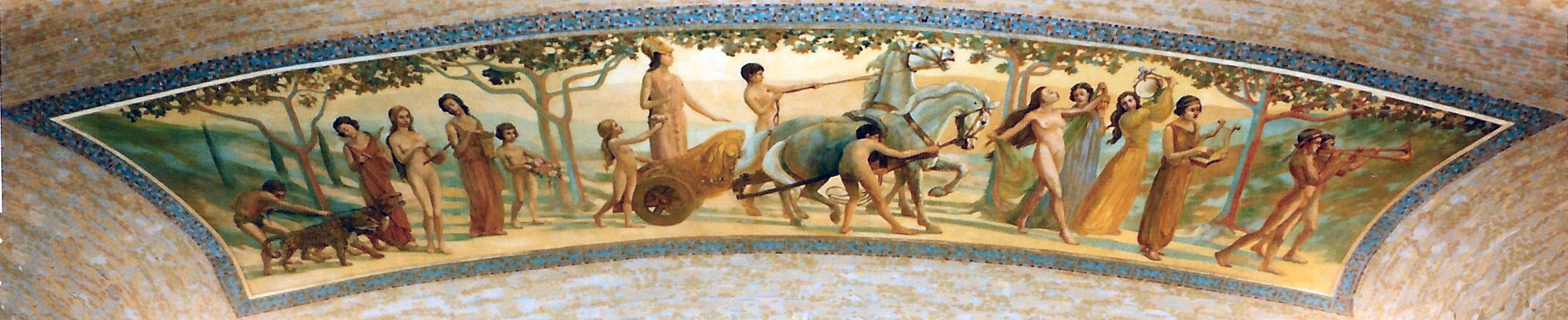
Mural by Lionel Walden, c. 1922, Hawaii Theatre, Honolulu, Hawaii

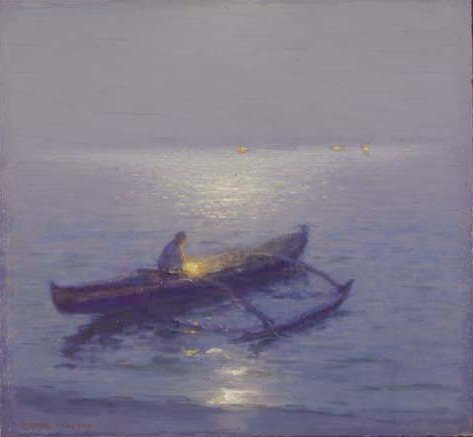
Night Fisherman, oil on board painting by Lionel Walden

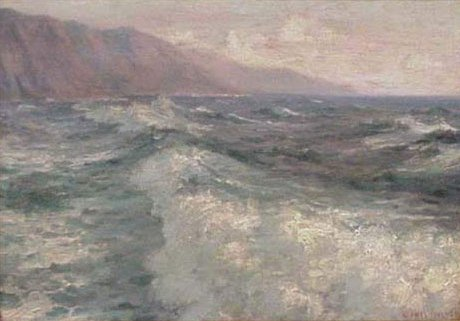
North Shore, Oahu, oil on panel painting by Lionel Walden, c. 1915, 10 x 14 in.
