= Kate Kelly (sculptor) =

American sculptor (1882–1964)

Kate Kelly or Katherine Kelly (1882–1964) was an American sculptor, photographer, and printmaker. She was born in California, the daughter of suffragette Hester Lambert Harland. Kate first visited Hawaii with her mother in 1898, at age 16. She studied at the Partington Art School in San Francisco (later San Francisco Art Institute), where she met the painter and printmaker John Melville Kelly, whom she married in 1908. After living in San Francisco, the couple went to Hawaii in 1923. Their plan was to stay a year, while John worked for an advertising agency creating material to promote housing developments and tourism, however, they fell in love with the islands and the people and stayed permanently. The Kellys immediately identified with the native Hawaiians and became their champions in images and in print.

The family built a home on Black Point which Kate helped to design with architect and friend Louis E. Davis in 1931. The home and her art is still owned by their heirs, John & Kate Kelly Estate Collection.

== Art ==
An award-winning sculptress, Kate sold popular miniature sculptures and was the first to popularize miniatures of hula dancers and lei sellers. She often exhibited with the Honolulu Printmakers Association at the Honolulu Academy of Art (now Honolulu Museum of Art).

Much of her husband's printmaking work and her own sculptures are based on Kate's photography which she practiced diligently documenting her family's life and the lives of Hawaiians at a critical turning point in their history.

Hawaiian Head (Joseph "Red" Kaua), bronze sculpture by Kate Kelly, 1933–4, Honolulu Museum of Art

Kate took a class in printmaking at the University of Hawaii with Huc-Mazelet Luquiens (1881–1961) while continuing her sculpting seen in monuments across the islands and the busts of dear friends like Joseph "Red" Kaua. Because of failing vision and other health issues Kate slowly made less art and devoted her time to promoting the art of her husband.

Kelly's sculptures in public places include:

- Hawaiian Head, Joseph “Red” Kaua , bronze bust, ca. 1930s, John Dominis and Patches Damon Holt Gallery, Honolulu Museum of Art
- Kaipo, Sketch of a Hawaiian Chinese Boy , bronze bust, 1933, John Dominis and Patches Damon Holt Gallery, Honolulu Museum of Art
- Bas-relief of King Kalākaua, old Bethel Street Police Station, Honolulu
- Aloha Oe Tribute to Queen Lili'uokalani at Washington Place, Honolulu
- Amelia Earhart plaque, Diamond Head Lookout, Honolulu
