= Alexander Samuel MacLeod =

American painter (1888–1956)

Surfing Waikiki, oil on art board painting by Alexander Samuel MacLeod, c. 1940

Fishpond, Kahaluu, lithograph by Alexander Samuel MacLeod, c. 1940

Alexander Samuel MacLeod (1888–1956), also known as Sam MacLeod, was a Canadian-born American painter and printmaker. He was best known for his depictions of Hawaii landscapes, and portraits of Native Hawaiians.

== Early life and education ==
He was born on April 12, 1888, on Prince Edward Island, Canada.

MacLeod studied at McGill University. After moving to San Francisco, he continued his artistic training at the Mark Hopkins Institute of Art (now San Francisco Art Institute) under Frank Van Sloun.

== Career ==
He maintained an art studio in San Francisco in the Montgomery Block, and commuted to San Francisco from San Mateo, California.

In 1921, MacLeod arrived in Hawaii, where he worked in the art departments of the magazine Paradise of the Pacific, and the local papers, The Honolulu Advertiser and the Honolulu Star-Bulletin.

By 1929, he had returned to Canada and resided there for ten years. Again in Hawaii, MacLeod became the director of the graphic art department for the United States Army in the Pacific. In 1943, he published a book of his Hawaiian prints, The Spirit of Hawaii, Before and After Pearl Harbor. MacLeod is best known for his Hawaiian landscapes (such as Fishpond, Kahaluu) and sympathetic representations of rural Hawaii's native population (such as Surfing Waikiki).

MacLeod retired to Palo Alto, California after the end of World War II, where he died in 1956.

== Collections ==
The California State Library, Sacramento, California; the Fine Arts Museums of San Francisco; the Honolulu Museum of Art; the Iris & B. Gerald Cantor Center for Visual Arts at Stanford University, Palo Alto, California; the Nelson-Atkins Museum of Art, Kansas City, Missouri; the New York Public Library; the Seattle Art Museum; the Smithsonian American Art Museum in Washington, D.C.; and the University of Hawaii at Manoa, are among the public collections holding works by MacLeod.
