= John Melville Kelly =

American painter (1879–1962)

John Melville Kelly (1879–1962) was an American painter and printmaker.

== Biography ==
John Melville Kelly was born in Oakland, California in 1879 and raised on a cattle ranch in Phoenix, Arizona. He studied art at the Mark Hopkins Institute of Art (now the San Francisco Art Institute), with Eric Spencer Macky. There he met his wife and fellow artist, Kate Kelly.

Kelly worked for fourteen years as an illustrator for the San Francisco Examiner, and had even been a prizefighter. He married Kate in 1908 and their son, John Kelly Jr. (founder of Save Our Surf) was born in 1919. The family moved to Hawaii in 1923 after Kelly signed on with the H.K. McCann Advertising Agency who was advertising the Lanikai Beach housing development.

The family stayed in Hawaii and John took on several advertising jobs with the Hawaii Tourism Bureau, Standard Oil, and Kalakaua Acrees before taking a job with the Honolulu Star Bulletin as Head of the Art Department in 1926. He became known as the "Sunday etcher".

== Art ==
John Melville Kelly's oil on board painting 'Lei Makers on the Greensward', c. 1930

John's ravishing depictions of Polynesians was, in fact, what distinguished him from other artists in Hawaii at the time. The Kelly's immediately identified with the native Hawaiians and became their champions in print. John produced etchings and aquatints, primarily of human figures, though he occasionally did landscapes as well. His work preserves a pivotal point of Hawaiian history.

John was a graphic artist who evolved into a nationally recognized master printmaker. He developed techniques that cannot be replicated today. John helped found the Honolulu Printmakers Association in 1926, one of the oldest in the country. He was also a member of the California, Chicago, and Prairie Printmakers Associations. All held juried shows where his etchings won numerous awards at printmaking shows throughout the United States bringing Hawaii to the world stage.

The Honolulu Academy of Art (now Honolulu Museum of Art) featured his work in numerous solo and group exhibits throughout the decades, the last been a major exhibit of his work in 2005, which produced the beautiful catalogue of the exhibit, "Hawaiian Idyll: John Melville Kelly". He authored and illustrated "Etchings and Drawings of Hawaiians" in 1943, and "The Hula as Seen in Hawaii" in 1955. John Melville Kelly died in Honolulu in 1962.

The Hawaii State Art Museum, the Honolulu Museum of Art, and the Nelson-Atkins Museum of Art (Kansas City, Missouri), Saint Joseph College Art Gallery (West Hartford, Connecticut) and the San Diego Museum of Art (San Diego, California) are among the public collections holding work by John Melville Kelly.

The Kelly Estate Collection preserves both John and Kate's legacy and makes it available to the public through exhibitions and other programming.
