= Huc-Mazelet Luquiens =

American painter (1881–1961)

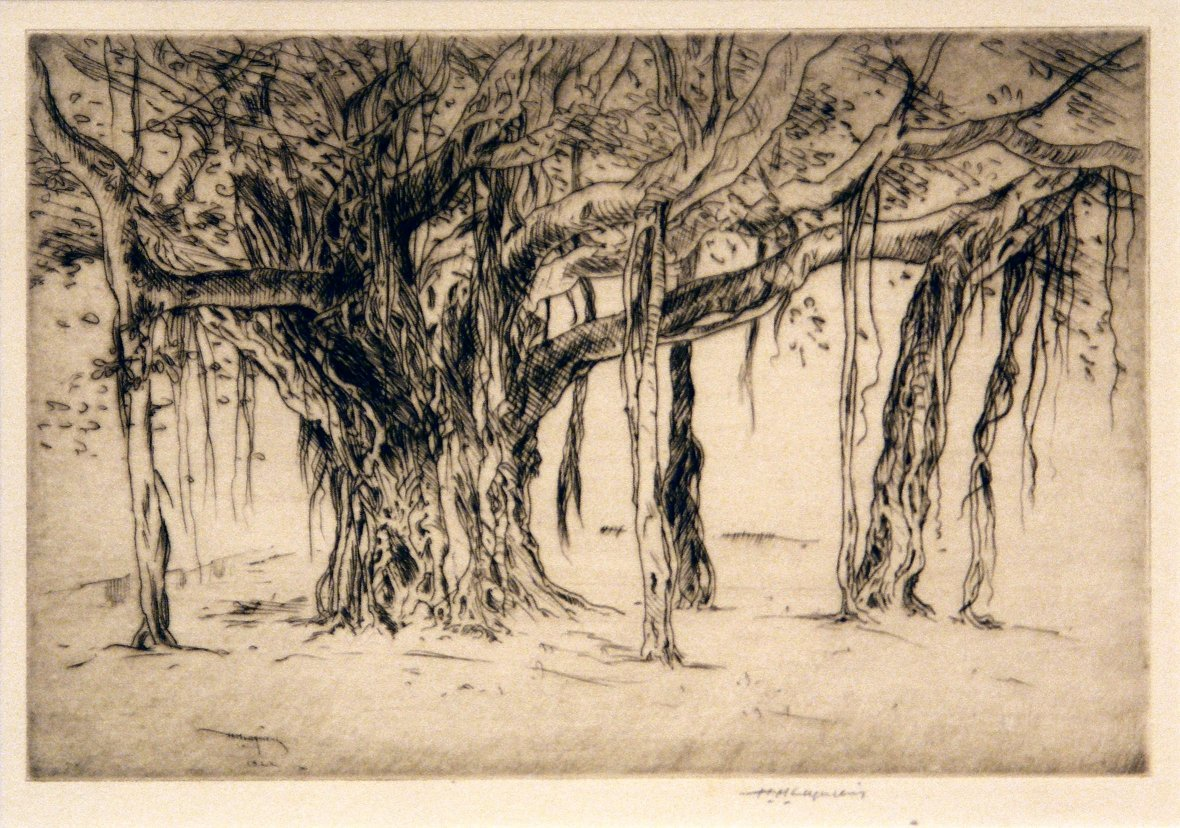
Huc-Mazelet Luquiens, Banyan - Study, etching, 1922, Hawaii State Art Museum

Manoa Valley from Round Top, oil on canvas painting by Huc-Mazelet Luquiens, c. late 1930s

Huc-Mazelet Luquiens (1881–1961) was an American printmaker, painter and art educator who was born June 30, 1881, in Massachusetts to Jules Luquiens a French-speaking Swiss and Emma Clark who was born in Ohio.

== Life ==
He graduated from Yale University where he received training in art, earning both a bachelor of arts and master of fine arts degrees. At Yale, he served on the editorial board of and contributed illustrations to campus humor magazine The Yale Record. After Yale, he continued his studies in Paris at the École Nationale Supérieure des Beaux-Arts and at the Académie Julian.

In New England, Luquiens focused his etchings on portraiture and architectural. In search of portrait commissions, he came to Hawaii in 1917 to visit his sister, who had married into the Judd family. The island landscapes proved irresistible, and Luquiens produced numerous studies. He is known for naming the Volcano School of Hawaiian painting the 'Little Hawaiian Renaissance'. After teaching at the Punahou School for some years, he was hired as the first teacher of art at the University of Hawaii where he is credited with the formation of the department and served as its chair from 1936 to 1945. Among the instructors who joined him were Ben Norris, Henry H. Rempel, Millard Sheets and Frederik Taubes. Norris calls Luquiens “the dean of Hawaiian artists of his generation and its professional leader in a very real way.” During his life, Luquiens was extremely active in community affairs concerning nature and art. He co-founded the organization, Honolulu Printmakers, which continues today. Huc-Mazelet Luquiens died in Honolulu in 1961.

Although best known for his small intaglio prints (such as Banyan - Study), he also painted in oils (such as Manoa Valley from Round Top). The Bishop Museum (Honolulu, Hawaii), the Butler Institute of American Art (Youngstown, Ohio), the Fine Arts Museums of San Francisco, the Hawaii State Art Museum, the Honolulu Museum of Art, the Isaacs Art Center (Waimea, Hawaii), the Nelson-Atkins Museum of Art (Kansas City, Missouri), the Hilo Art Museum (Hilo, Hawaii), the Isaacs Art Center (Waimea, Hawaii), and the Yale University Art Gallery are among the public collections holding prints by Huc-Mazelet Luquiens.
