= Eskridge =

Eskridge may refer to:

== People ==
- Charles Eskridge (disambiguation), multiple people
- Chauncey Eskridge (1917–1988), American lawyer and judge
- Durell Eskridge (born 1991), American football player
- D'Wayne Eskridge (born 1997), American football player
- George Eskridge (born 1943), American politician
- Jack Eskridge (1924–2013), American basketball player
- James C. Eskridge (1873–1949), American politician from Mississippi
- Kelley Eskridge (born 1960), American writer
- Robert Lee Eskridge (1891–1975), American genre painter
- William Eskridge (born 1951), American academic
- Zack Eskridge (born 1988), American football player
- Preston Eskridge, trans rights activist

== Places ==
- Eskridge, Kansas
- Eskridge, Mississippi
