= George Floyd protests in Hawaii =

Protests in Hawaii caused by the murder of George Floyd

- Part of George Floyd protests
- Date: May 28 – June 7, 2020 (1 week and 3 days)
- Location: Hawaii, United States
- Caused by: Police brutality; Institutional racism against African Americans; Reaction to the murder of George Floyd; Economic, racial and social inequality

This is a list of George Floyd protests in Hawaii. Following the murder of George Floyd, protests spread from Minneapolis to other parts of the United States, including Hawaii. Protests broke out in Honolulu on the night of May 30 and spread to over four other cities over the following days.

== Locations ==
=== Hanalei ===
On June 6, around 400 people held a "paddle out" around Hanalei Pier at Black Pot Beach Park to support Black Lives Matter and protest the murder of Floyd and other deaths from police violence.

=== Hilo ===
On June 3, at least 200 protesters gathered in Hilo, in memory of Floyd.

=== Honolulu ===
On May 30, hundreds of protesters marched from Waikiki to Ala Moana Beach Park and back to protest systemic racism and the murder of George Floyd. Although the protest remained peaceful, the Target store in Ala Moana closed early at 2:00 p.m. as a precaution. On May 31, additional peaceful protests were held in Kapolei and on Magic Island. Honolulu mayor Kirk Caldwell spoke in support of the protests and emphasized the importance of protesting peacefully.

On June 3, at least 200 people gathered outside of the Hawaii State Capitol in Urban Honolulu to protest Floyd's murder. Protesters, many of whom were Native Hawaiians, Pacific Islanders, and Asian Americans expressed solidarity with Floyd given the racial injustices they had felt also being minorities in the United States.

On June 5, a student-led protest in Waikiki was held, with some protesters calling to defund the Honolulu Police Department.

On June 6, around 2,000 protesters gathered in Ala Moana Beach Park. The crowd, which eventually grew to between 5,000 and 20,000 people, marched to the state capitol to show solidarity with Black Lives Matter. Dozens of state sheriffs and police officers also gathered at the capitol, but the event remained peaceful.

=== Kaanapali ===
On May 31, a peaceful paddle out and vigil was held for George Floyd off the beaches of West Maui.

=== Kahului ===
On May 30, about 150 protesters gathered at the intersection of Hāna Highway and Haleakalā Highway near downtown Kahului protesting Floyd's murder.

=== Kailua-Kona ===
On June 2 and June 3, protests occurred in and around Kailua-Kona.

=== Launiupoko ===
On May 31, over 300 people took part in a "paddle out" on Launiupoko Beach to honor George Floyd.

=== Lihue ===
On June 3, over 100 people gathered at the Lihue Civic Center to protest Floyd's murder. They walked through the streets and posed with police officers at the Historic County Building.

=== Nanakuli ===
On June 7, around 200 people protested on the streets to demand justice for George Floyd.
