= National Register of Historic Places listings in Montgomery County, Mississippi =

Location of Montgomery County in Mississippi

This is a list of the National Register of Historic Places listings in Montgomery County, Mississippi.

This is intended to be a complete list of the properties and districts on the National Register of Historic Places in Montgomery County, Mississippi, United States. Latitude and longitude coordinates are provided for many National Register properties and districts; these locations may be seen together in a map.

There are 8 properties and districts listed on the National Register in the county.

This National Park Service list is complete through NPS recent listings posted October 30, 2026.

== Current listings ==
	Name on the Register	Image	Date listed	Location	City or town	Description
1	Immanuel Episcopal Church	Immanuel Episcopal Church	July 27, 2005 (#05000740)	416 Summit St. 33°28′57″N 89°44′02″W	Winona	
2	James C. Purnell House		July 12, 1990 (#90001077)	504 Summit St. 33°28′59″N 89°44′04″W	Winona	
3	Stafford's Wells Hotel	Stafford's Wells Hotel	September 8, 2000 (#00001059)	38 Stafford Wells Rd; 33°26′27″N 89°43′43″W	Winona	
4	U.S. Post Office	U.S. Post Office	April 7, 1981 (#81000330)	306 Summit St. 33°28′57″N 89°43′48″W	Winona	
5	Winona Commercial Historic District		July 1, 1994 (#94000659)	Roughly bounded by Magnolia St., Central Ave., Carrollton St., and Sterling Ave. 33°28′56″N 89°43′41″W	Winona	
6	Winona Community House		March 10, 2009 (#09000113)	113 Sterling St. 33°28′57″N 89°43′46″W	Winona	
7	Winona Historic District	Winona Historic District	June 1, 2015 (#15000303)	Roughly bounded by Oakwood Cemetery, N. Applegate, Raper, Railroad, Branch & Mortimer Sts., Speedway & S. Union Aves. 33°28′56″N 89°43′42″W	Winona	
8	Wisteria Hotel	Wisteria Hotel	December 18, 1979 (#79001332)	Central Ave. 33°28′56″N 89°43′36″W	Winona	

== See also ==
- List of National Historic Landmarks in Mississippi
- National Register of Historic Places listings in Mississippi
