= Jesse A. Adams =

Former American politician

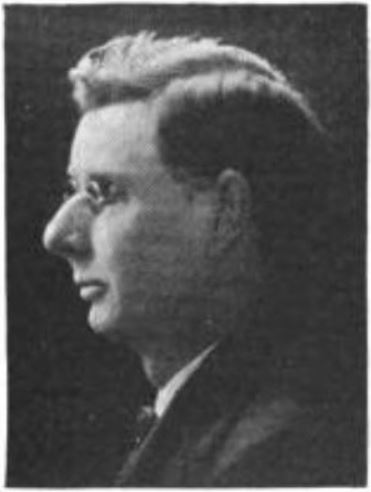
- c. 1924

Member of the Mississippi State Senate from the 26th district
- In office January 1928 – January 1932
- Preceded by: S. E. Turner
- Succeeded by: J. M. Grantham

Member of the Mississippi House of Representatives from the Montgomery County district
- In office January 1920 – January 1928

Personal details
- Born: December 10, 1876 near Coffeeville, Mississippi, U.S.
- Died: January 21, 1940 (aged 63) Sweatman, Mississippi, U.S.
- Party: Democratic

Jesse Austin Adams (December 10, 1876 – January 21, 1940) was an American piano tuner, teacher and Democratic politician. He served in the Mississippi State Senate from 1928 to 1932 and in the Mississippi House of Representatives from 1920 to 1922 and from 1924 to 1926. He was blind.

== Early life and career ==
Jesse Austin Adams was born on December 10, 1876, near Coffeeville, Mississippi. He was the son of James Allison Adams and Kate Beulah (Gore) Adams. Through his mother, Jesse Adams was a cousin of Oklahoma senator Thomas Gore. At the age of ten months, Adams lost his sight from spinal meningitis; he remained blind for the rest of his life. Adams attended public schools until the age of twelve. He then attended the Institute for the Blind in Jackson, Mississippi. Finally, Adams attended a high school in Walthall, Mississippi. In 1905, Adams began teaching music in McCarley, Mississippi. In November 1912, Adams started teaching all subjects at a school four miles north of McCarley. By 1920, Adams lived in the unincorporated community of Sweatman, Montgomery County Mississippi. By 1928, Adams was a farmer and piano tuner by occupation.

== Political career ==
In 1919, Adams was elected to represent Montgomery County, Mississippi, as a Democrat in the Mississippi House of Representatives from 1920 to 1924. In 1923, Adams was re-elected, and served from 1924 to 1928. In 1927, Adams was then elected to represent the 26th District in the Mississippi State Senate and served from 1928 to 1932. During his Senate term, Adams served on several committees including: Banks & Banking; Humane & Benevolent; Local & Private Legislation; Municipalities; and Railroads & Finances. From 1928 to 1938, Adams was the executive secretary of the Mississippi Commission for the Blind. By the time of his death, he then became a field worker for the Mississippi department of public welfare.

== Personal life and death ==
Adams was a member of the Christian Church. He married Appie Ray in Bellefontaine, Mississippi, on August 2, 1908. They had two daughters. Adams died of a heart attack on the morning of January 21, 1940, at his home in Sweatman, Mississippi.
