= Stafford Springs =

Stafford Springs may refer to:

- Stafford Springs, Connecticut, a community in Stafford, Connecticut
- Stafford Springs, Mississippi
- Stafford Mineral Springs
