= Marguerite Blasingame =

Hawaiian American sculptor, painter (1906–1947)

- Born: Marguerite Louis; 1906; Honolulu, Territory of Hawaii, US
- Died: March 11, 1947; Mexico
- Education: University of Hawaiʻi (BA), Stanford University (MFA)
- Known for: Mural, painting, sculpture
- Movement: Art Deco, Hawaiian Modernism
- Spouses: Frank Blasingame (m. 1929; div. 1936) Pierre Forrest Charles (m. 1943)

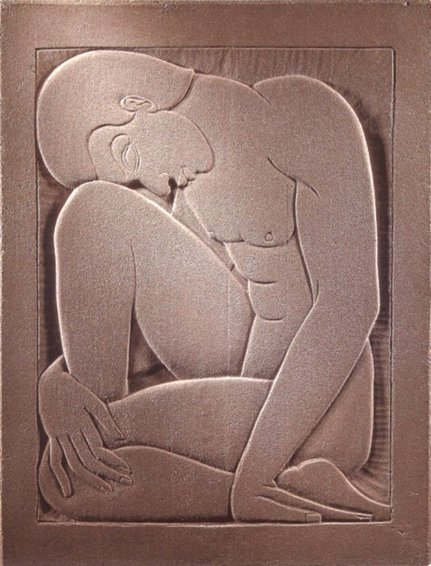
Stone bas-relief of fallen male nude by Marguerite Louis Blasingame

Marguerite Louis Blasingame Charles (1906 – March 11, 1947) was an American sculptor and painter. She co-founded the Hawaiian Mural Arts Guild in 1934.

== Early life and education ==
Marguerite Blasingame was born as Marguerite Louis in 1906, in Honolulu, Territory of Hawaii (now Hawaii, U.S.).

She graduated from the University of Hawaii and went on to earn an M.A. degree in fine art from Stanford University in 1928.

== Career ==
The artist then returned to Hawaii, where she became an established sculptor of figural works, many of them bas-reliefs in wood and stone. Her depictions were usually sinuous in contour with simplified anatomy. During the Great Depression, Blasingame was a Works Progress Administration artist and filled many commissions for architectural panels.

Blasingame co-founded the Hawaiian Mural Arts Guild in 1934, along with Isami Doi, Madge Tennent, and others. She authored A Course in Art Appreciation for the Adult Layman, which was published by Stanford University Press. Blasingame died in 1947 while traveling in Mexico.

On Saturday 15 March 1947, fellow island artist Madge Tennent published the following tribute to Blasingame in The Honolulu Advertiser:

To her many artist friends she represented a youthful and indomitable vitality in art, which was supported by a capacity for grueling hard work in her chosen field of true fresco and sculptured bas-relief in Hawaiian wood and stone. She was, by almost any way of thinking, too young to die. But the strangely wonderful thing is this, that she has in her sadly short young life, left more important works of art which have been placed where everybody may enjoy them, than any other island artist.

One of her wooden sculptures is installed in the John Dominis and Patches Damon Holt Gallery of the Honolulu Museum of Art. She made four wood carvings flanking the lectern and pulpit of Church of the Crossroads in 1935, symbolizing four great religious faiths: Zoroastrianism, Judaism, Hinduism and Buddhism. Other sculptures in public places includes an untitled 1935 marble sculpture in Ala Moana Park, Honolulu, Hawaii and Hawaiian Decagonal Fountain (1934–1935) at Kawananakoa School, Honolulu, Hawaii.

== List of works ==
- Hawaiian Decagonal Fountain (1934–1935), Kawananakoa School, Honolulu, Hawaii
- Frescos (1935), four wood carvings, Church of the Crossroads, Honolulu, Hawaii
- Hawaiian Couple (1935), two marble bas relief, Lester McCoy Pavilion in Ala Moana Beach Park, Honolulu, Hawaii
- Ka Wai Ake Akua (1939), green slate bas relief, Board of Water Supply administration building, Honolulu, Hawaii
