= Alva, Mississippi =

- Unincorporated community
- Location within Mississippi Location within the United States
- Coordinates: 33°38′16″N 89°30′26″W
- Country: United States
- State: Mississippi
- County: Montgomery
- Elevation: 338 ft (103 m)
- Time zone: UTC-6 (Central (CST))
  - Summer (DST): UTC-5 (CDT)
- ZIP code: 38925
- Area code: 662
- GNIS feature ID: 666240

Alva is an unincorporated community in Montgomery County, Mississippi, United States. Alva is 6 miles (9.7 km) east of Sweatman and 14.1 miles (22.7 km) east of Duck Hill on Mississippi Highway 404. In 1900, Alva had a school, several stores, a cotton gin, and a church.
