= Stewart, Mississippi =

- Census-designated place
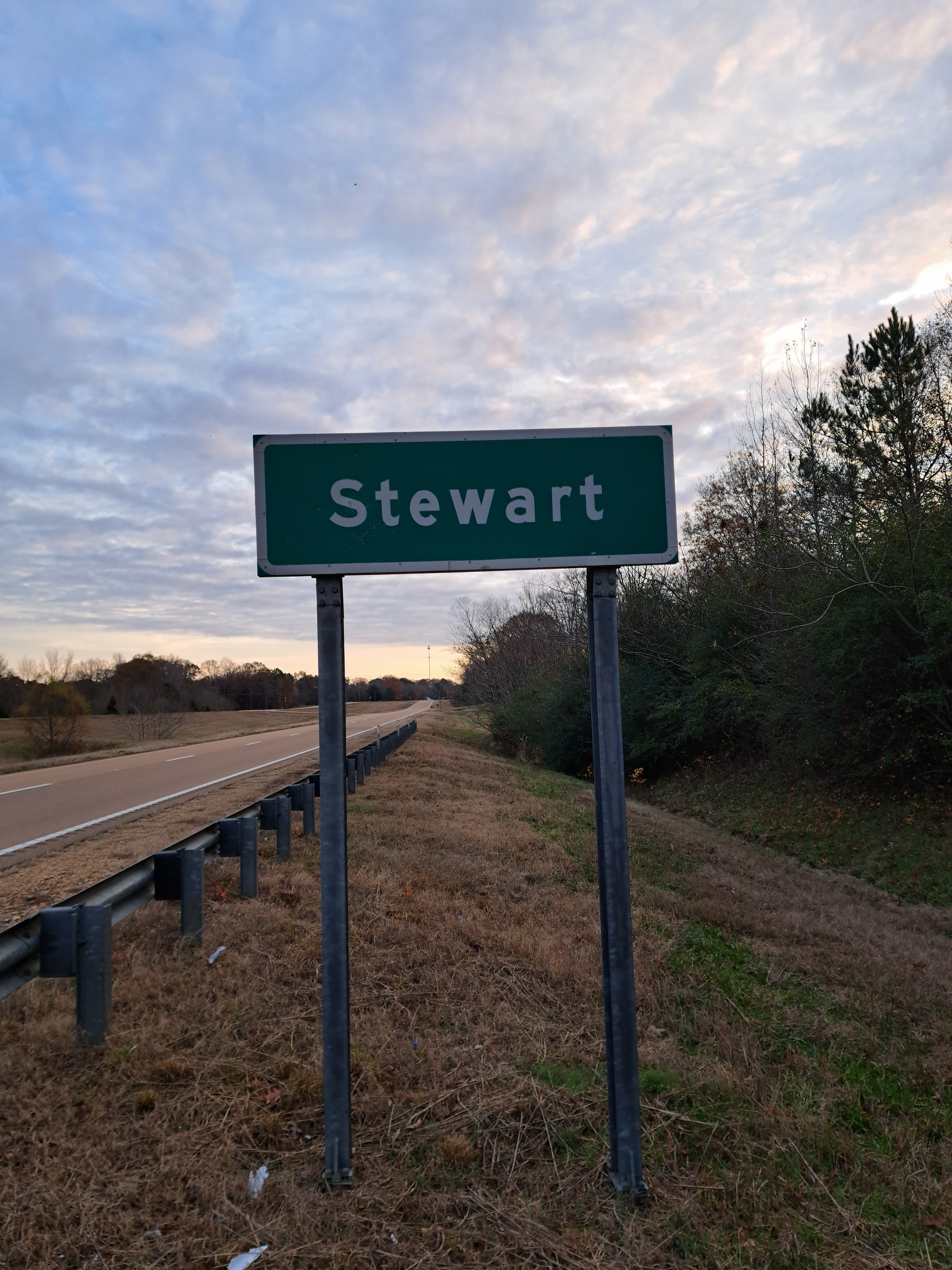
- Highway sign when entering Stewart

- Location within Mississippi Location within the United States
- Coordinates: 33°27′02″N 89°26′10″W
- Country: United States
- State: Mississippi
- County: Montgomery

Area
  - Total: 1.13 sq mi (2.92 km^{2})
  - Land: 1.13 sq mi (2.92 km^{2})
  - Water: 0 sq mi (0.00 km^{2})
- Elevation: 351 ft (107 m)

Population (2020)
  - Total: 99
  - Density: 88/sq mi (33.9/km^{2})
- Time zone: UTC-6 (Central (CST))
  - Summer (DST): UTC-5 (CDT)
- ZIP code: 39767
- Area code: 662
- GNIS feature ID: 678280
- FIPS Code: 28-70640

Stewart is a census-designated place (CDP) and unincorporated community in Montgomery County, Mississippi, United States. As of the 2020 census, it had a population of 99.

The Stewart Volunteer Fire Department is located in Stewart.

== History ==
The Georgia Pacific Railway completed a line through Stewart in late 1880s.

By 1906, Stewart had a post office and a population of 200.

A bed of iron ore located 3 mi (4.8 km) north of Stewart was mined during the 1950s, and shipped by railway to Birmingham, Alabama for processing.

It was first listed as a census-designated place for the 2020 census.

== Geography ==
Stewart is in eastern Montgomery County and is bordered to the north by Webster County. U.S. Route 82 passes through the community, leading west 8 miles (13 km) to Kilmichael and northeast 12 miles (19 km) to Eupora. Winona, the Montgomery county seat, is 19 miles (31 km) to the west via US 82.

According to the U.S. Census Bureau, the Stewart CDP has an area of 1.13 square miles (2.93 km^{2}), all land. The Big Black River passes to the south of the community.

== Demographics ==
Historical population
Census	Pop.	Note	%±
2020	99		—
U.S. Decennial Census; 2020

Stewart was first listed as a census designated place in the 2020 U.S. census.

=== 2020 census ===
Stewart CDP, Mississippi – Racial and ethnic composition Note: the US Census treats Hispanic/Latino as an ethnic category. This table excludes Latinos from the racial categories and assigns them to a separate category. Hispanics/Latinos may be of any race.
Race / Ethnicity (NH = Non-Hispanic)	Pop 2020	% 2020
White alone (NH)	91	91.92%
Black or African American alone (NH)	4	4.04%
Native American or Alaska Native alone (NH)	1	1.01%
Asian alone (NH)	0	0.00%
Pacific Islander alone (NH)	0	0.00%
Some Other Race alone (NH)	0	0.00%
Mixed Race or Multi-Racial (NH)	3	3.03%
Hispanic or Latino (any race)	0	0.00%
Total	99	100.00%
