= Huntsville, Mississippi =

- Unincorporated community
- Location within Mississippi Location within the United States
- Coordinates: 33°20′53″N 89°27′40″W
- Country: United States
- State: Mississippi
- County: Montgomery
- Elevation: 404 ft (123 m)
- Time zone: UTC-6 (Central (CST))
  - Summer (DST): UTC-5 (CDT)
- Area code: 662
- GNIS feature ID: 671596

Huntsville is an unincorporated community in Montgomery County, Mississippi, United States. In 1900, Huntsville had a population of 76 and a church. A post office operated under the name Huntsville from 1872 to 1907.
