= Sweatman, Mississippi =

- Unincorporated community
- Location within Mississippi Location within the United States
- Coordinates: 33°38′03″N 89°34′47″W
- Country: United States
- State: Mississippi
- County: Montgomery
- Elevation: 295 ft (90 m)
- Time zone: UTC-6 (Central (CST))
  - Summer (DST): UTC-5 (CDT)
- ZIP code: 38925
- Area code: 662
- GNIS feature ID: 678459

Sweatman is an unincorporated community in Montgomery County, Mississippi, United States. Sweatman is 6 miles (9.7 km) west of Alva and 8.5 miles (13.7 km) east of Duck Hill south of Mississippi Highway 404.

In 1900, Sweatman had a population of 22. A post office operated under the name Sweatman from 1880 to 1959.

The Sweatman soil series is named for the community.

== Notable people ==
- Jesse A. Adams (1876–1940), American politician and member of both houses of the Mississippi Legislature
- Frank Purnell (1933–2007), former NFL player and head football coach of Alcorn State University from 1960 to 1963
