= Sibleyton, Mississippi =

- Unincorporated community
- Location within Mississippi Location within the United States
- Coordinates: 33°26′17″N 89°31′30″W
- Country: United States
- State: Mississippi
- County: Montgomery
- Elevation: 344 ft (105 m)
- Time zone: UTC-6 (Central (CST))
  - Summer (DST): UTC-5 (CDT)
- Area code: 662
- GNIS feature ID: 677768

Sibleyton is an unincorporated community in Montgomery County, Mississippi, United States. Sibleyton is located on the Columbus and Greenville Railway. A post office operated under the name Sibleyton from 1903 to 1932.A post office operated under the name Poplar Creek from 1848 to 1958.
