= Frank Purnell =

American football player and coach (1933–2007)

No. 33
- Position: Fullback

Personal information
- Born: April 5, 1933; Sweatman, Mississippi, U.S.
- Died: April 19, 2007 (aged 74); Winona, Mississippi, U.S.
- Listed height: 5 ft 11 in (1.80 m)
- Listed weight: 230 lb (104 kg)

Career information
- High school: Spring Hill (Sweatman, Mississippi)
- College: Alcorn A&M

Career history

Playing
- Green Bay Packers (1957)

Coaching
- Alcorn A&M (1960–1963) (head coach)

Career statistics
- Rushing attempts: 5
- Rushing yards: 22
- Receptions: 2
- Receiving yards: 16
- Stats at Pro Football Reference

Franklin Deland Purnell (April 5, 1933 – April 19, 2007) was an American football player and coach. He played professionally as a fullback in the National Football League (NFL) with the Green Bay Packers during the 1957 NFL season. Purnell served as the head football coach at his alma mater, Alcorn Agricultural and Mechanical College—now known as Alcorn State University—from 1960 to 1963, compiling a record of 14–20.

== Head coaching record ==
Year	Team	Overall	Conference	Standing	Bowl/playoffs
Alcorn A&M Braves (South Central Athletic Conference) (1960–1961)
1960	Alcorn A&M	4–4		1st	
1961	Alcorn A&M	3–4		1st	
Alcorn A&M Braves (Southwest Athletic Conference) (1962–1963)
1962	Alcorn A&M	4–5	2–5	7th	
1963	Alcorn A&M	3–7	0–7	8th	
Alcorn A&M:		14–20			
Total:		14–20			
National championship Conference title Conference division title or championship game berth
