= Magic Island (Hawaii) =

Small man-made peninsula in Honolulu, Hawaii

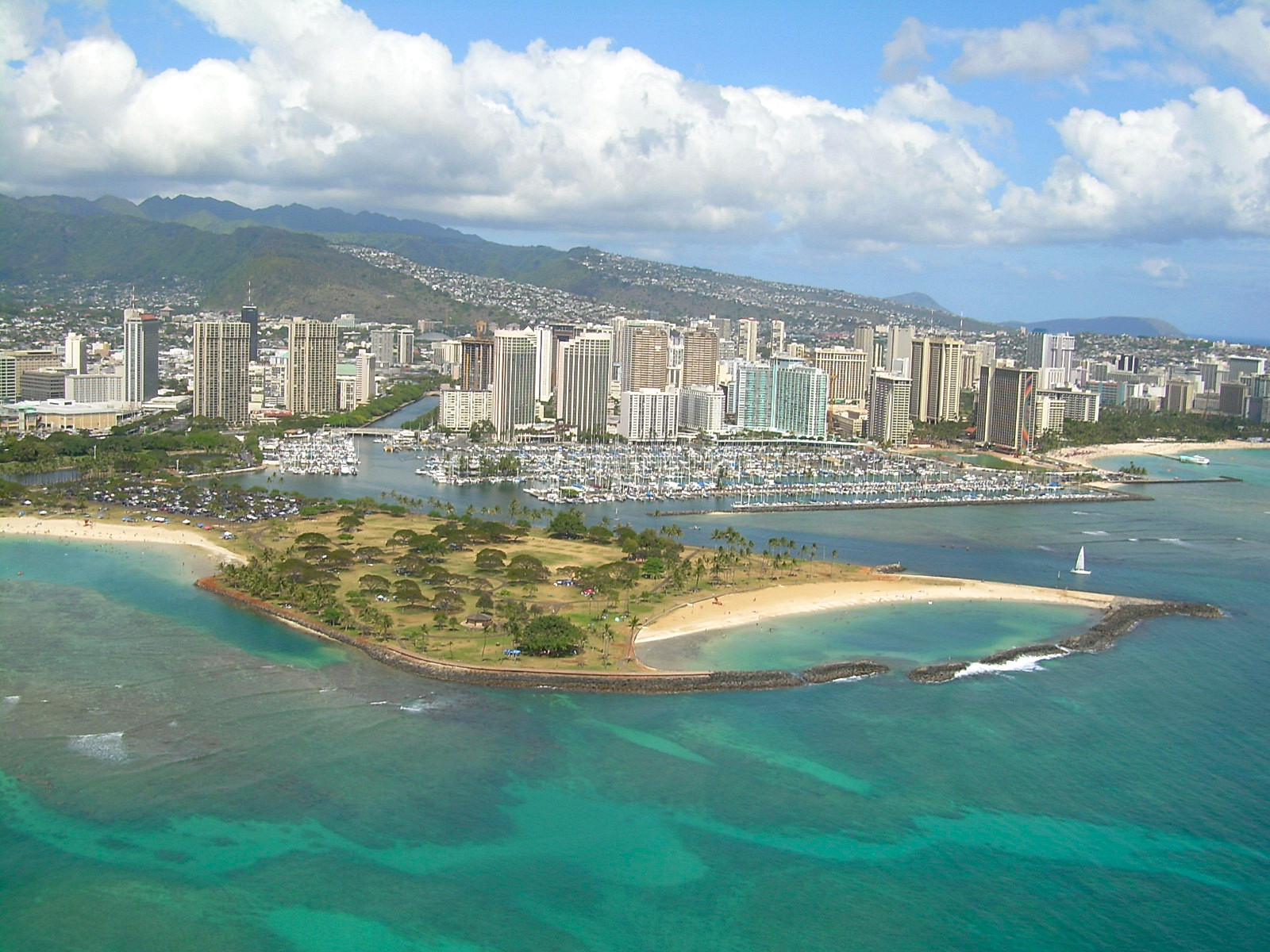
- Aerial view of Magic Island, featuring Ala Wai Yacht Harbor
- Interactive map of Magic Island
- Location: Honolulu, Hawaii
- Coordinates: 21°17′05″N 157°50′48″W

Magic Island is a small man-made peninsula in Honolulu, Hawaii, adjacent to Ala Moana Beach Park and the Ala Wai Yacht Harbor. It was created in 1964 as the site of a resort complex, but was subsequently converted to a park. The name was changed to "Aina Moana," but the new name is used infrequently.

The park on Magic Island is a popular spot where people gather for picnics, frisbee, socializing, and occasional festival or drama performances. Because it was a preferred location among homeless squatters, overnight camping was recently banned in the park.

Each year, the Ala Moana Center puts on a fireworks show over Magic Island for the Fourth of July that draws numerous spectators to the surrounding parks. In conjunction with the show, the Ala Moana Center ropes off a portion of its parking lot for a Fourth of July concert featuring many local bands.

The park's hours are from sunrise to sunset daily.

== Gallery ==
Magic Island during the day

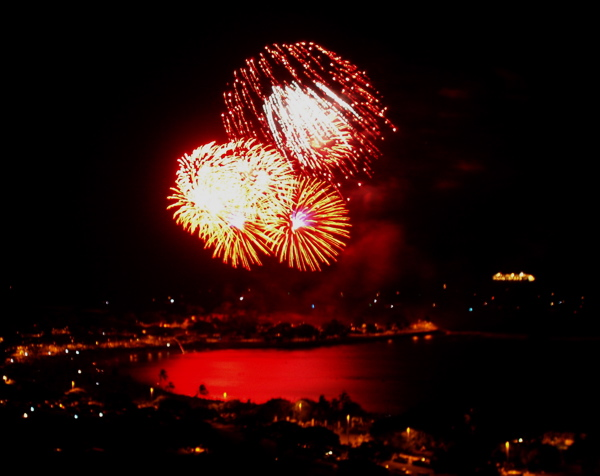
Fireworks over Magic Island

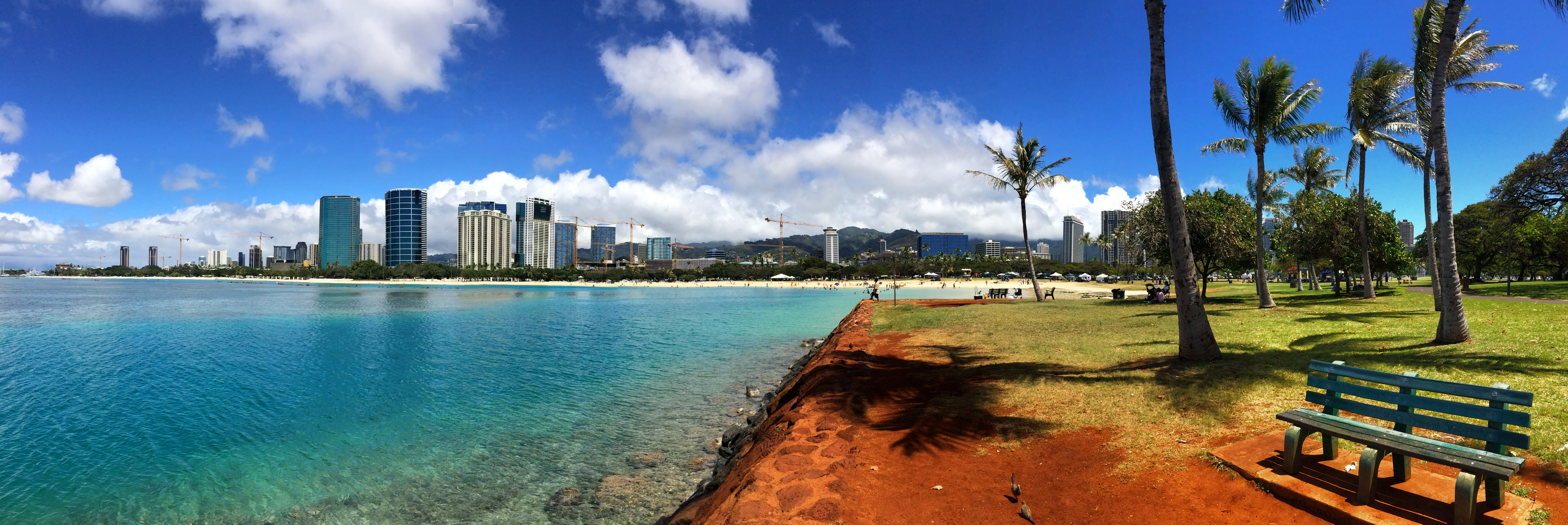
Panorama from Magic Island
