= Church of the Crossroads =

Historic church in Hawaii, United States

- U.S. National Register of Historic Places
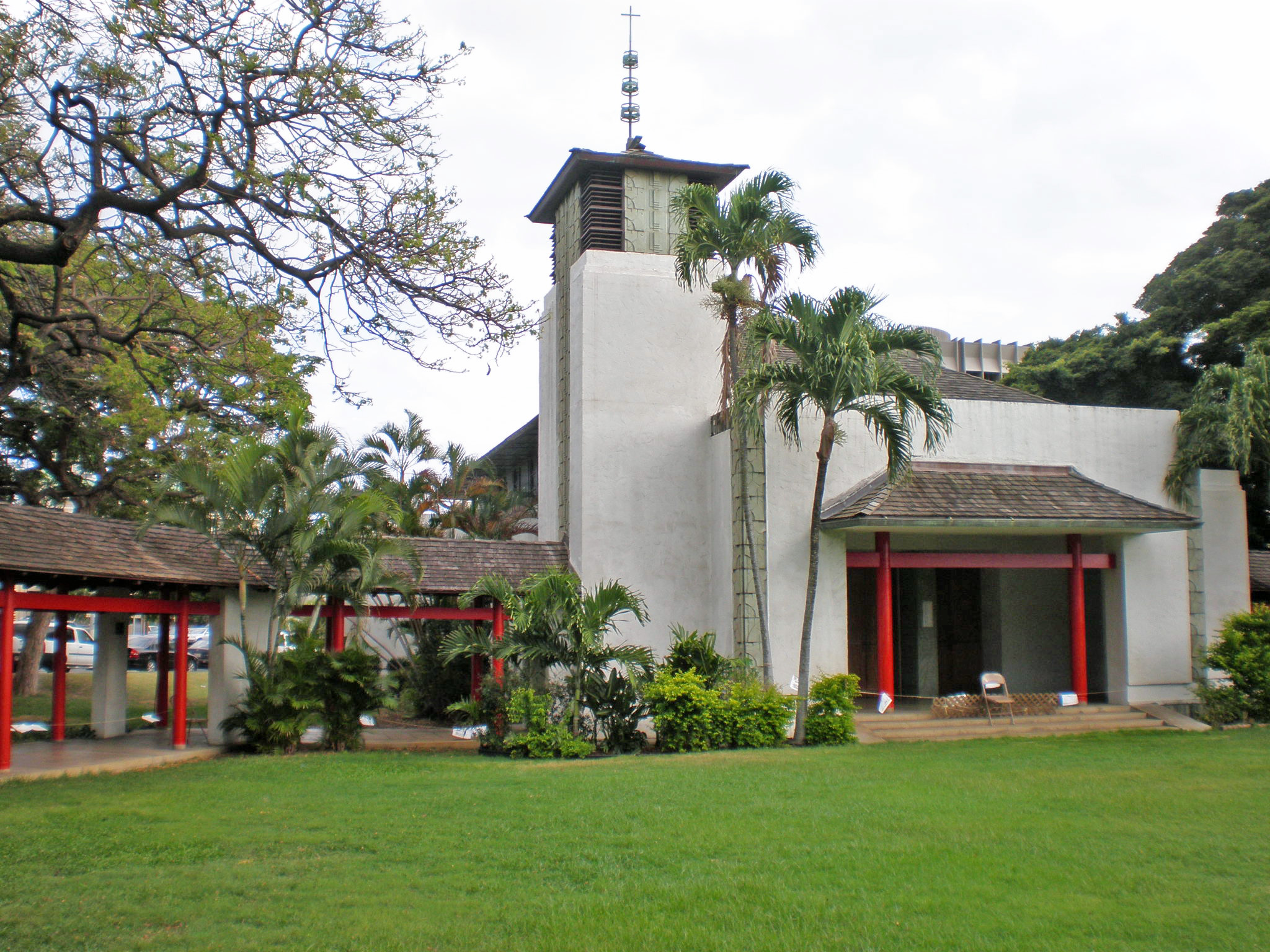
- Church of the Crossroads

- Location within Hawaii
- Nearest city: Honolulu, Hawaii
- Coordinates: 21°17′56″N 157°49′28″W
- Area: less than one acre
- Built: 1935
- Architect: Claude A. Stiehl
- Architectural style: Hawaiian style
- NRHP reference No.: 92001551
- Added to NRHP: November 20, 1992

The Church of the Crossroads building at 1212 University Avenue in Honolulu, Hawaii was designed in 1935 by architect Claude A. Stiehl, who combined features of Asian, European, and Hawaiian architecture. It was listed on the National Register of Historic Places in 1992.

== History ==
The buildings on the attractively landscaped 2.25-acre (9,100 m^{2}) lot are built of wood, stucco, and stone with decorative elements. The interior courtyard is surrounded by covered walkways that connect the main sanctuary with offices, meeting halls, and a small seminar room. The red columns throughout the complex were inspired by the Summer Palace and Temple of Heaven in Beijing, China. At the raised front end of the classic, cross-shaped nave are an altar of Philippine mahogany and four wood carvings with symbols of Buddhism, Hinduism, Judaism, and Zoroastrianism.

The eclectic architecture of the church buildings well reflect the varied ethnicity of the congregation, whose founders in 1923 formed the first racially mixed Protestant congregation in the Territory of Hawaii. Its charter members were students from a parochial school, Mid-Pacific Institute, which was founded to Americanize and evangelize local-born children, and from a public school, President William McKinley High School, where two-thirds of the students in 1930 were Japanese Americans. Among its first leaders were a handful of White American educational evangelists with strong ties to Asia and Hawaii. Its first pastor (1923–1946) was Galen R. Weaver, a graduate of Ohio State University and Union Theological Seminary in New York who had originally planned to become a missionary in China.

After meeting during its early years at Mission Memorial Hall, across the street from the Kawaiahao Church and Mission Houses (but later taken over by the City), the congregation began raising funds and looking for its own site. By 1929, the membership of 174 included 64 of Japanese descent, 63 of Chinese, and 47 of other local ethnicities. Few were over 30 years old, but they managed to buy and improve a parcel of land on University Avenue, within walking distance of Mid-Pacific Institute, for $20,000. By the time the building was finished, the project cost almost $50,000, $40,000 of which came from major local benefactors. It was dedicated in December 1935.

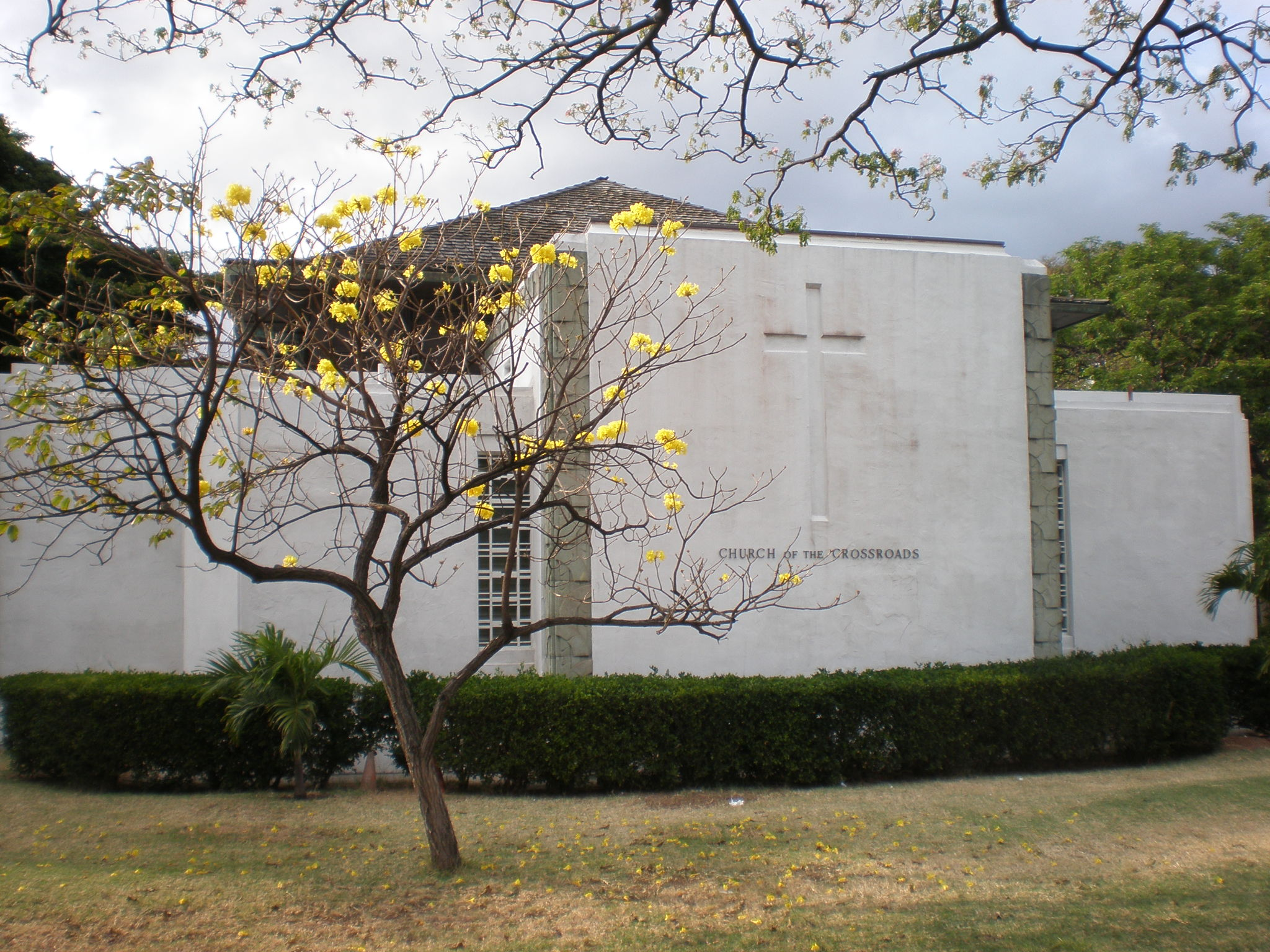
Back end of nave

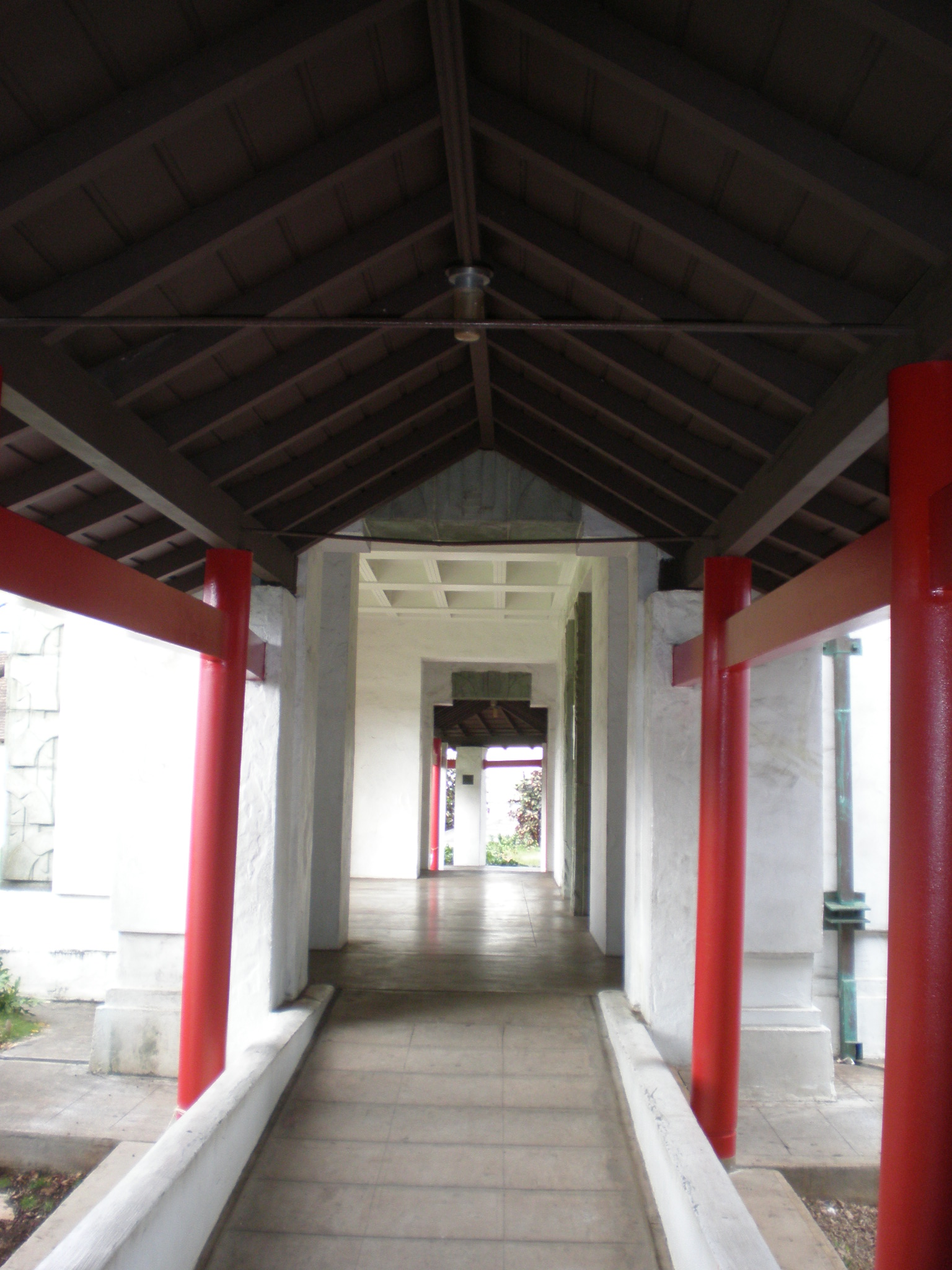
Loggia leading to front entrance

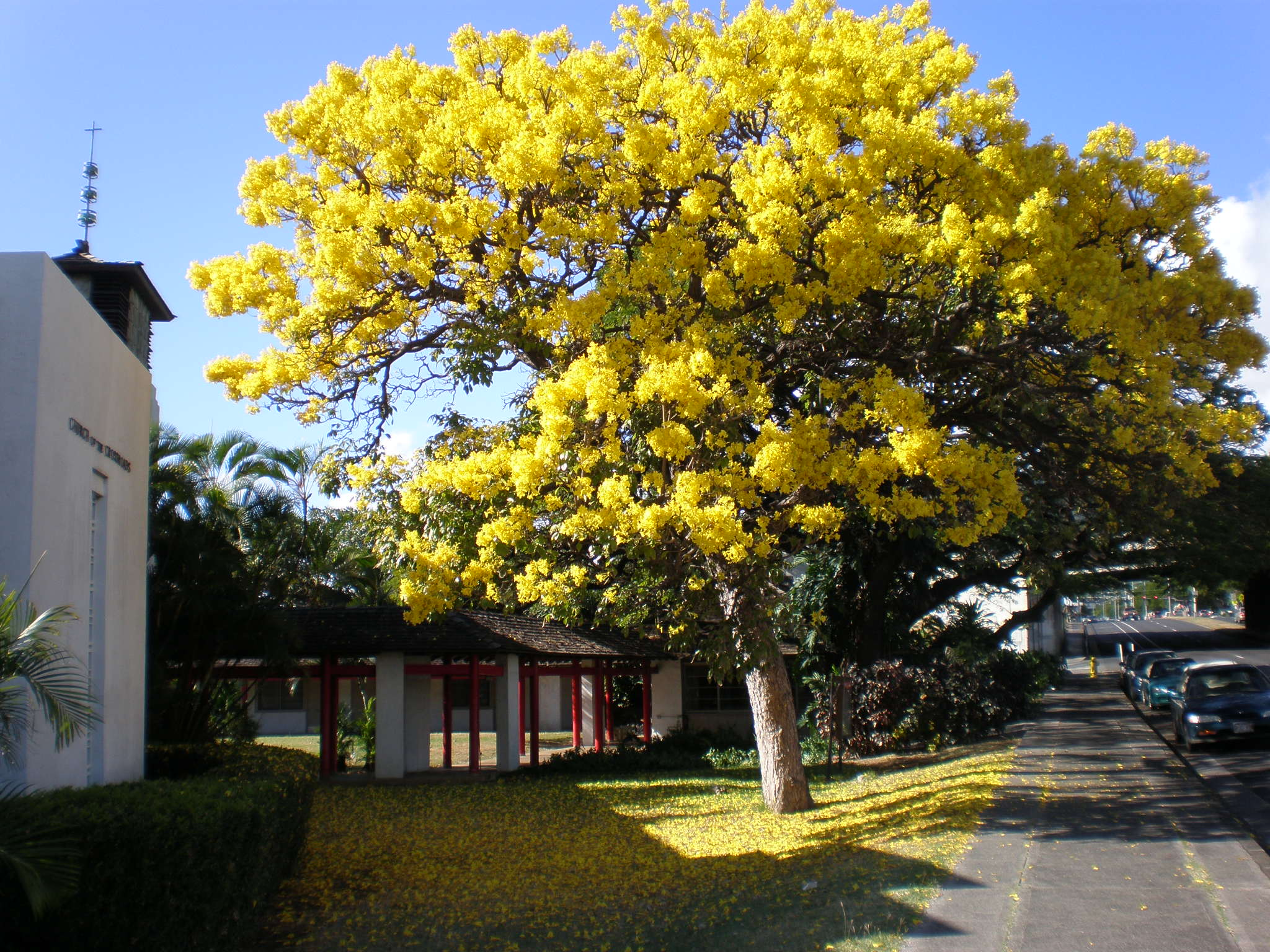
University Avenue side of church lot

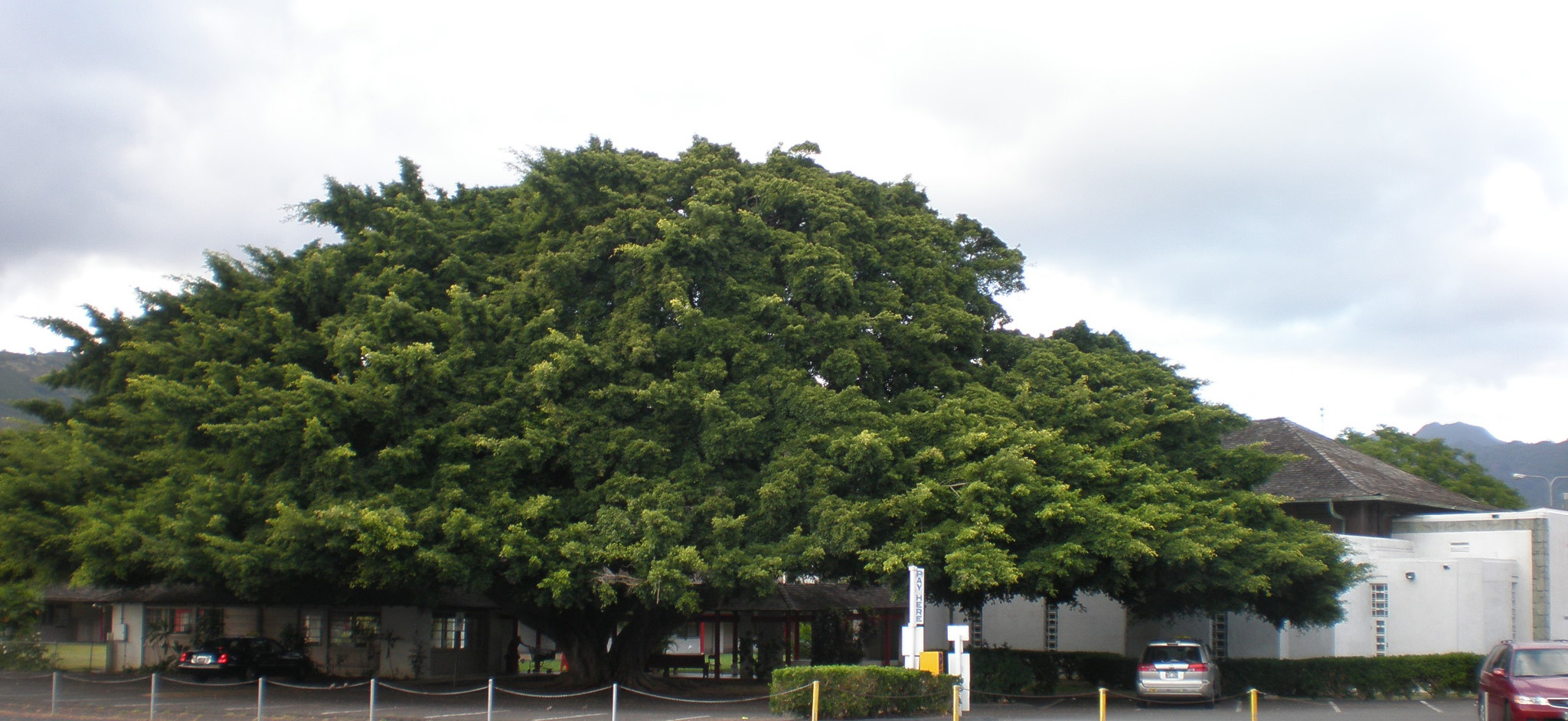
Banyan planted in 1935 by Wo Sing Ho
