= James C. Purnell House =

Historic house in Mississippi, United States

- U.S. National Register of Historic Places
- Location within Mississippi Location within the United States
- Location: 504 Summit St., Winona, Mississippi
- Coordinates: 33°28′59″N 89°44′4″W
- Area: 3.1 acres (1.3 ha)
- Built: 1873
- Built by: Frank Hawkins
- Architectural style: Greek Revival, Italianate
- NRHP reference No.: 90001077
- Added to NRHP: July 12, 1990

The James C Purnell House is at 504 Summit Street in Winona, Mississippi.

The house was built in 1873 by Major Frank Hawkins, a prominent business man and builder. The architecture is a combination of Greek Revival and Italianate. Upon his death in 1896 the home fell to his daughter Mamie and her husband James C Purnell. Mr Purnell was an important figure in early Winona. He was a businessman, philanthropist, city official and builder of Winona's first public school. The home was placed on the National Register of Historic Places in 1990.
