= Charles Eskridge =

Charles Eskridge may refer to:

- Charles Vernon Eskridge (1833–1900), American politician, lieutenant governor of Kansas
- Charles R. Eskridge III (born 1963), American judge
