= Robert Lee Eskridge =

American artist (1891–1975)

Hukilau, oil on canvas painting by Robert Lee Eskridge, c. 1940

Robert Lee Eskridge (November 22, 1891 – April 14, 1975) was an American genre painter, muralist and illustrator.

== Biography ==
He was born in Philipsburg, Pennsylvania, to Ella May Moore and Joshua Hargus Eskridge. Eskridge moved with his family to Pasadena, California as a child. He studied at the University of Southern California, the Los Angeles College of Fine Arts, the Art Institute of Chicago, the Chicago Academy of Fine Arts and with George Senseney and André Lhote in Paris. After traveling extensively in Spain and the South Seas, he lived in Chicago, New York, and Coronado Beach, California (1917–32). He moved to Honolulu in 1932 and taught at the University of Hawaii. During the Great Depression he was a Works Progress Administration muralist. His murals are in the Ala Moana Park Sports Pavilion in Honolulu and at the Palmer House Hilton in Chicago.

The Honolulu Museum of Art and Smithsonian American Art Museum are among the public collections holding works of Eskridge.

== Books ==
=== As author and illustrator ===
- Manga Reva. The Forgotten Islands (1931). Bobbs Merrill. Adult non-fiction.
- South Sea Playmates (1933). Bobbs Merrill. Children's non-fiction.
- Umi: The Hawaiian Boy Who Became a King (1936). John C. Winston Company.

=== As illustrator ===
- No-Wa-Na: An Indian Tale Told in Verse by John Fremont Kyger. (1919). Fremont Publishing, Chicago.
- When Tytie Came by Alfred Machard. (1920). The Reilly & Lee Co., Chicago.
- The Boy King of the Cannibal Islands by C.A.F. Ducorron. (1932). Bobbs Merrill.
- Pikoi and Other Legends of the Island of Hawaii as retold by Caroline Curtis; Mary Kawena Pukui, editor. (1949). Kamehameha Schools Press.
