= Ala Moana Beach Park =

Park in Honolulu, Hawaii

Coordinates: 21.28873°N 157.84826°W

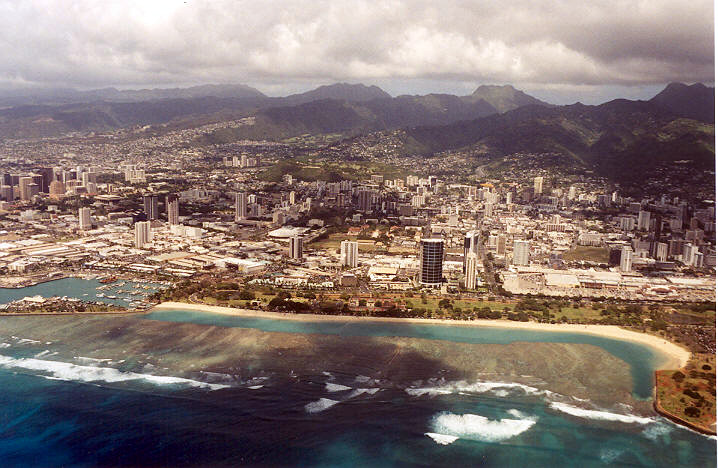
Aerial view of Ala Moana Beach Park and its beach. Magic Island is on the right.

Ala Moana Beach Park is a free public park on the island of Oahu in the U.S. state of Hawaii, located between Waikiki and downtown Honolulu. This 100-acre (0.40 km^{2}) park has a wide gold-sand beach that is over a half-mile (800 m) long.

Protected by a shallow reef offshore, it is one of the most popular open ocean swimming sites in Hawai’i, with an estimated 4 million visitors annually. However, there are sharp corals, so most people prefer the east end of the beach (the one that's closer to Diamond Head) where the ocean bottom is sandy and has no reef or rocks. The middle section and west end of the beach has rocks on the nearshore ocean bottom, which makes entering the ocean trickier. Lifeguards are stationed on the beach daily.

Ala Moana's ocean bottom drops quickly, so novice swimmers should use caution. Big grassy areas, banyans and palm trees make the park a good place to picnic, barbecue, play various ball games or go running. There are lifeguards, showers, restrooms, phones, tennis courts, picnic tables, food concessions and a music pavilion. Ala Moana Beach Park is a favorite among Honolulu residents. It is right next to "Magic Island" where many cultural events are held.

The park is closed from 10:00 p.m. to 4:00 a.m. Police enforce the closure with citations and arrests.

Like almost all of Honolulu's city parks, Ala Moana Beach Park had many homeless people during the day and night, until the city started closing the park for the night in 2006. Fodors travel guide rated it a "high crime area" at night after dark partly on this basis.

== History ==
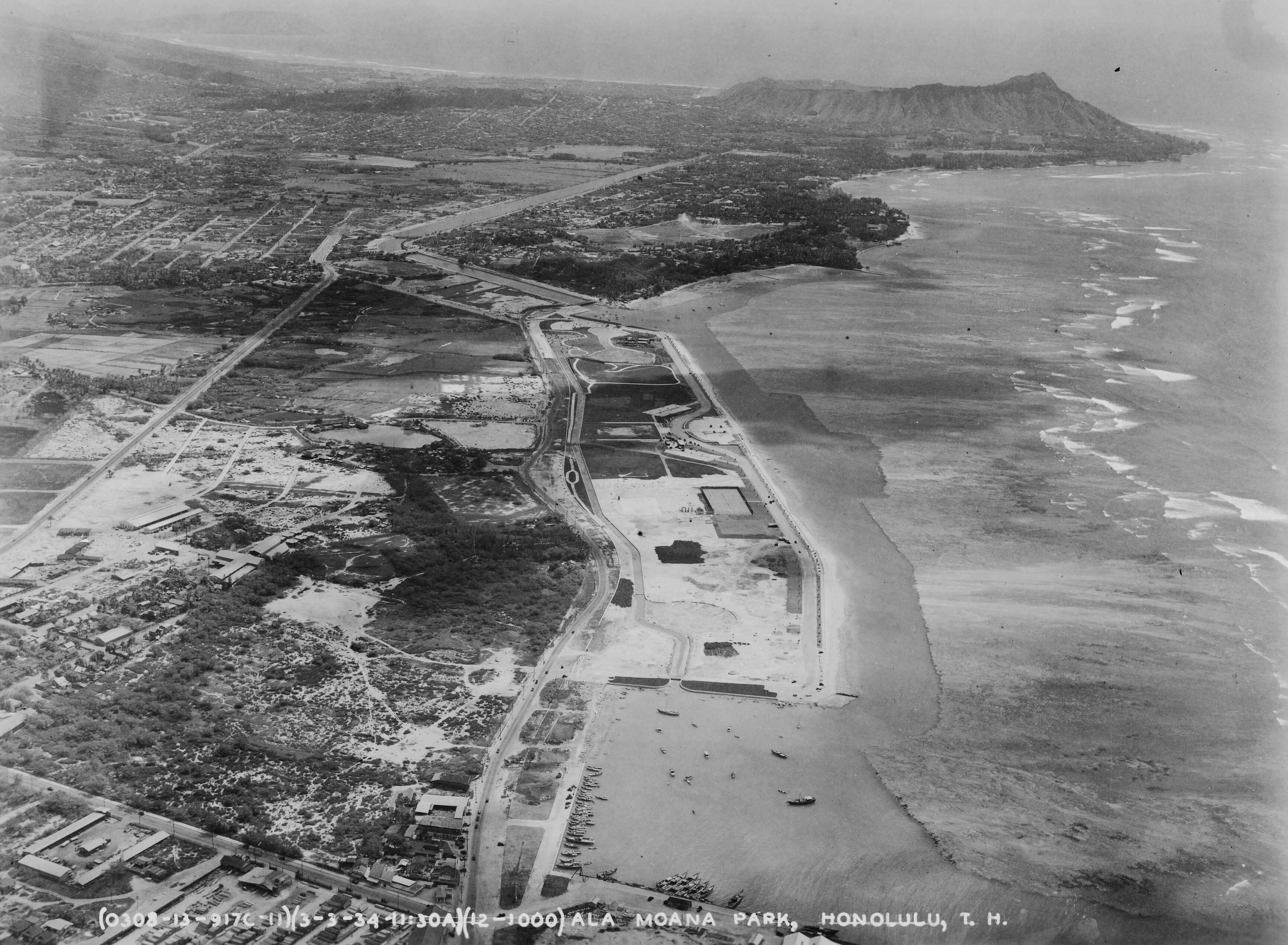
Ala Moana Park, 1934 with Diamond Head in background

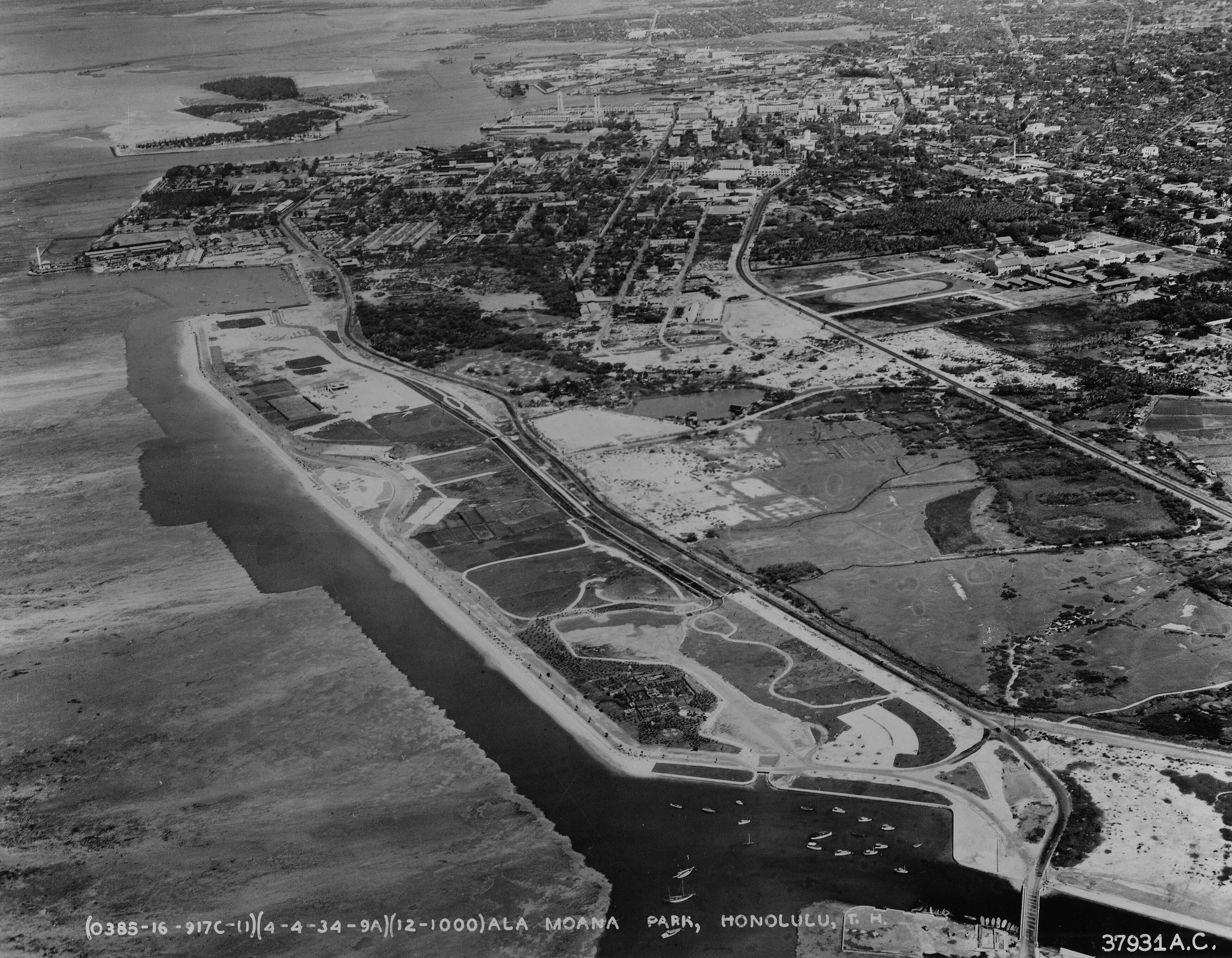
Ala Moana Park 1934

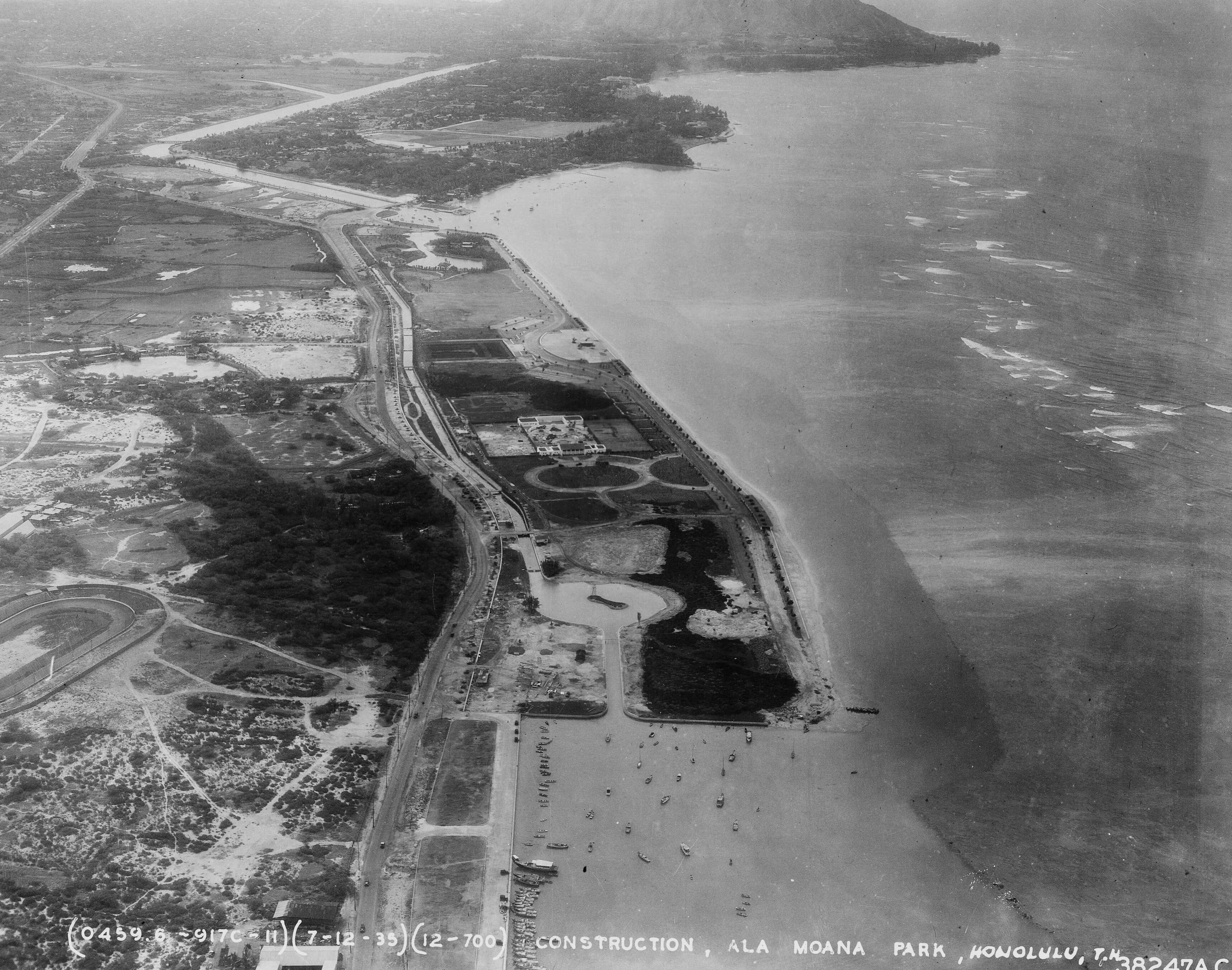
Construction in 1935

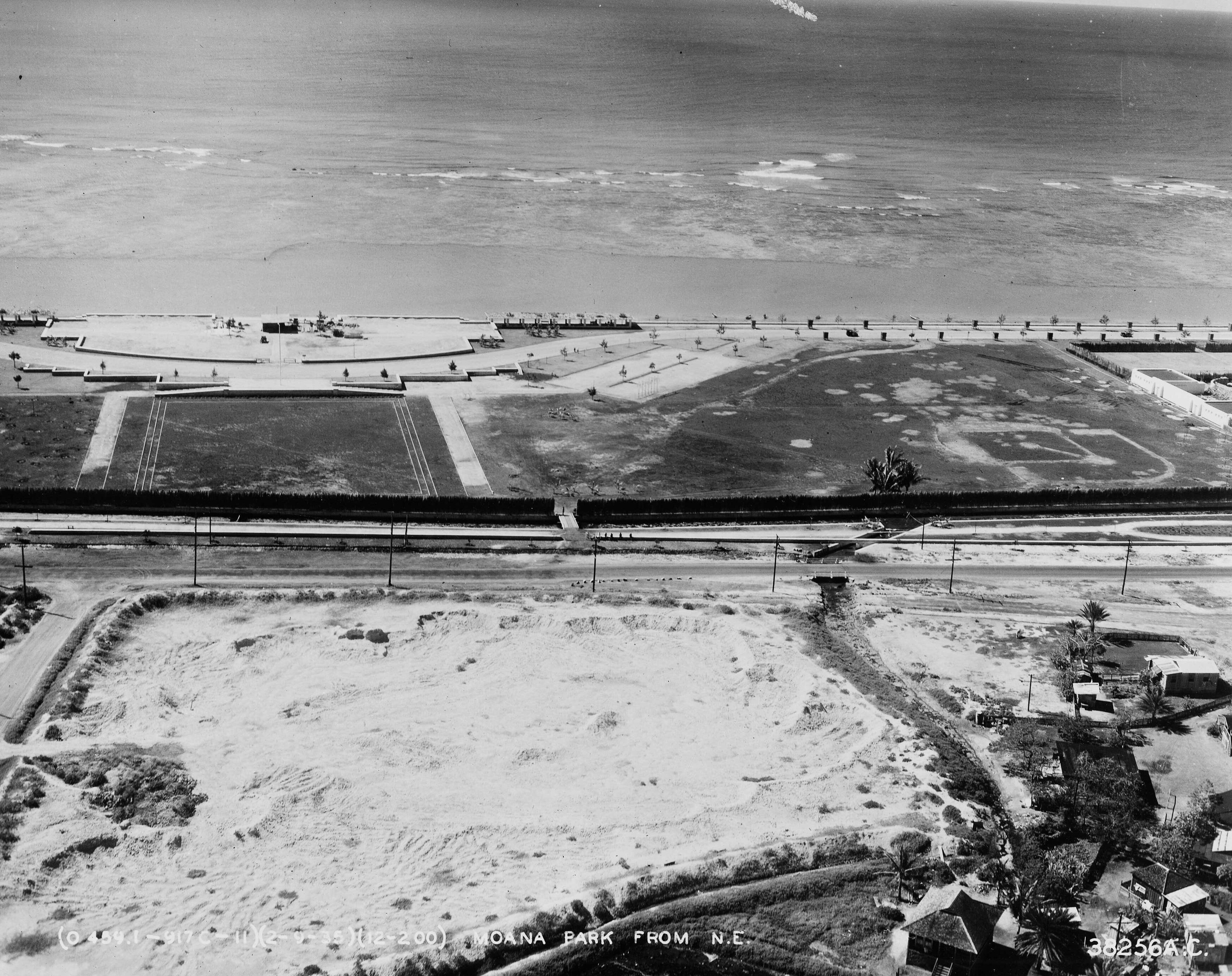
Construction, 1935

Ala Moana Regional Park as we know it today rests on reclaimed land that was once swampy marshland. In the 1920s Ala Moana Beach Park was a wetland with bulrushes, kiawe trees, and coconut palms that the city used as a garbage dump. The land appears to have been included in land transferred to the US government following annexation. The federal government then deeded the land back to the Territory of Hawaii and then the city of Honolulu in 1927, with the condition that the property be used wholly as a public park.

In 1931, the Parks Board designated the land as Moana Park and initiated development. The Hawaiian Dredging Company deposited their dredgings much of which was coral reef to fill in the marsh. The park added a sport pavilion, lawn bowling green, Banyan court, and bridal path bridge. The pavilion includes murals painted by and bas relief sculptures made by Marguerite Louis Blasingame. The bowling green was designed by Henry Sims Bent.

Dredging created two ponds and drainage canals, which allowed runoff of natural water. The bridges and entry portals were also designed by Henry Sims Bent.

The Sports Pavilion, Banyan Garden, tennis courts, and murals by Robert Lee Eskridge were completed in 1937 as part of the New Deal efforts by the Civil Works Administration and the Federal Emergency Relief Administration. While the Federal government provided the labor, local resources were required for construction materials. Construction of the walls and terraces used a technique called concrete boulder construction. This allowed use of inexpensive materials and tools and local workers with limited construction experience.

During World War II (1941-1946), the park was used as a staging area and military battery. The military constructed barracks, an armory, and temporary fortification to support a heavier presence of personnel and weapons .

Originally named Moana Park, the Parks Board changed the park’s name to Ala Moana, “path [to the] sea” in 1947. The beach was created in 1954. The deep swimming area fronting the beach is a former boat channel that was dredged through the coral reef in the late 1920s to join Kewalo Basin with the Ala Wai Harbor. In 1955, Hawaiian Dredging Company closed the west end of the channel with a landfill, now Kewalo Basin Park. Originally dredged for boat traffic, the channel is 20 to 30 feet deep and 1,000 yards long. From 1957 to 1961, concession stands and bathrooms were added. Henry Kaiser suggested the creation of a “magic island” of hotels, theaters, and swimming pools. The existing park would have been made into a parking lot.

The land was constructed in 1962 through the reclamation of thirty acres of shallow reef. Named Magic Island by the developers, the peninsula was the first phase of a resort hotel complex that called for two more islands to be constructed on the reef off Ala Moana Beach Park. After public outcry, the project stopped after the development of Magic Island, leaving the State with a man-made peninsula, which they converted into a public park. In 1972 the State officially renamed Magic Island ‘Aina Moana, or “land [from the] sea,” to recognize that the park is made from dredged coral fill, but residents still call it Magic Island.

McCoy Pavilion was added to the Diamond Head side of the courtyard in 1975 and is named after Charles Lester McCoy, who presided over the creation of the park in the 1930s. McCoy’s widow donated $1.2 million for construction after her death. McCoy Pavilion is currently used for special events such as the annual Greek Festival and the Hawaiian Scottish Festival and Highland games.

The park was added to the Hawaii State Register of Historic Places in 1988.

In May 2025, a footbridge across Ala Moana Boulevard opened, connecting Ala Moana Beach Park with the neighborhood of Kakaʻako.

== Improvement plans ==
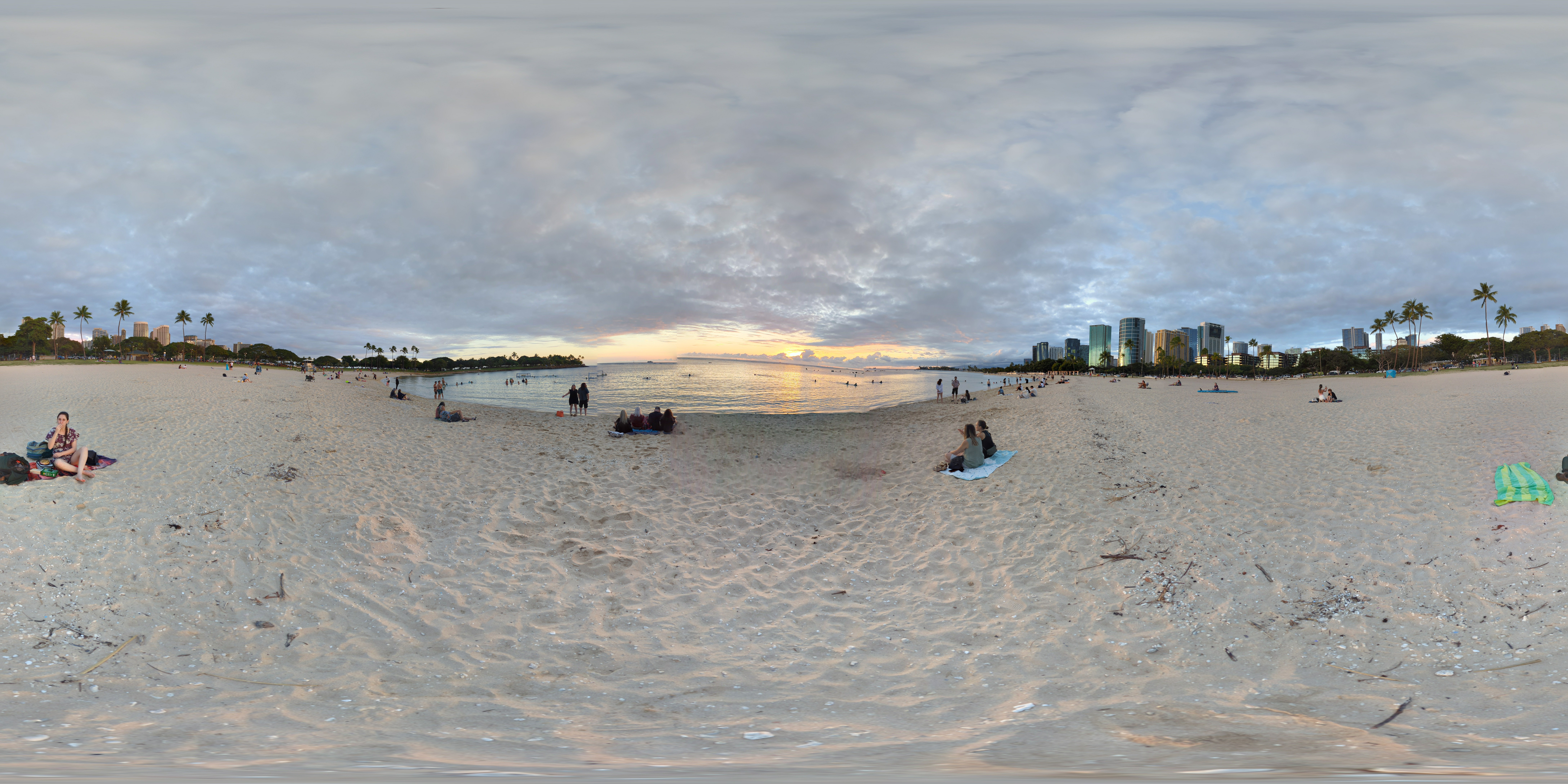
The beach at sunset (view as a 360° interactive panorama)

The city of Honolulu has proposed an improvement plan for Ala Moana Beach Park and Magic Island. The proposal includes changes to parking, replenishment of the beach sand, renovations to canals, ponds, McCoy Pavilion, the lawn bowling and canoe halau areas, repairs to the canal bridge and park entrances, improved pedestrian access near Piikoi and Queen streets, and the addition of a dog park and playground. The proposed changes to parking and the dog park have been controversial, so the city has amended the proposals and sought additional public comment.

Of note, changes to parking have been controversial in the past; the 1975 park plan called for cars to be prohibited from the park roadways and three multistory garages for cars to be built.

== See also ==
- List of beaches in Oahu
