= Eskridge, Mississippi =

- Unincorporated community
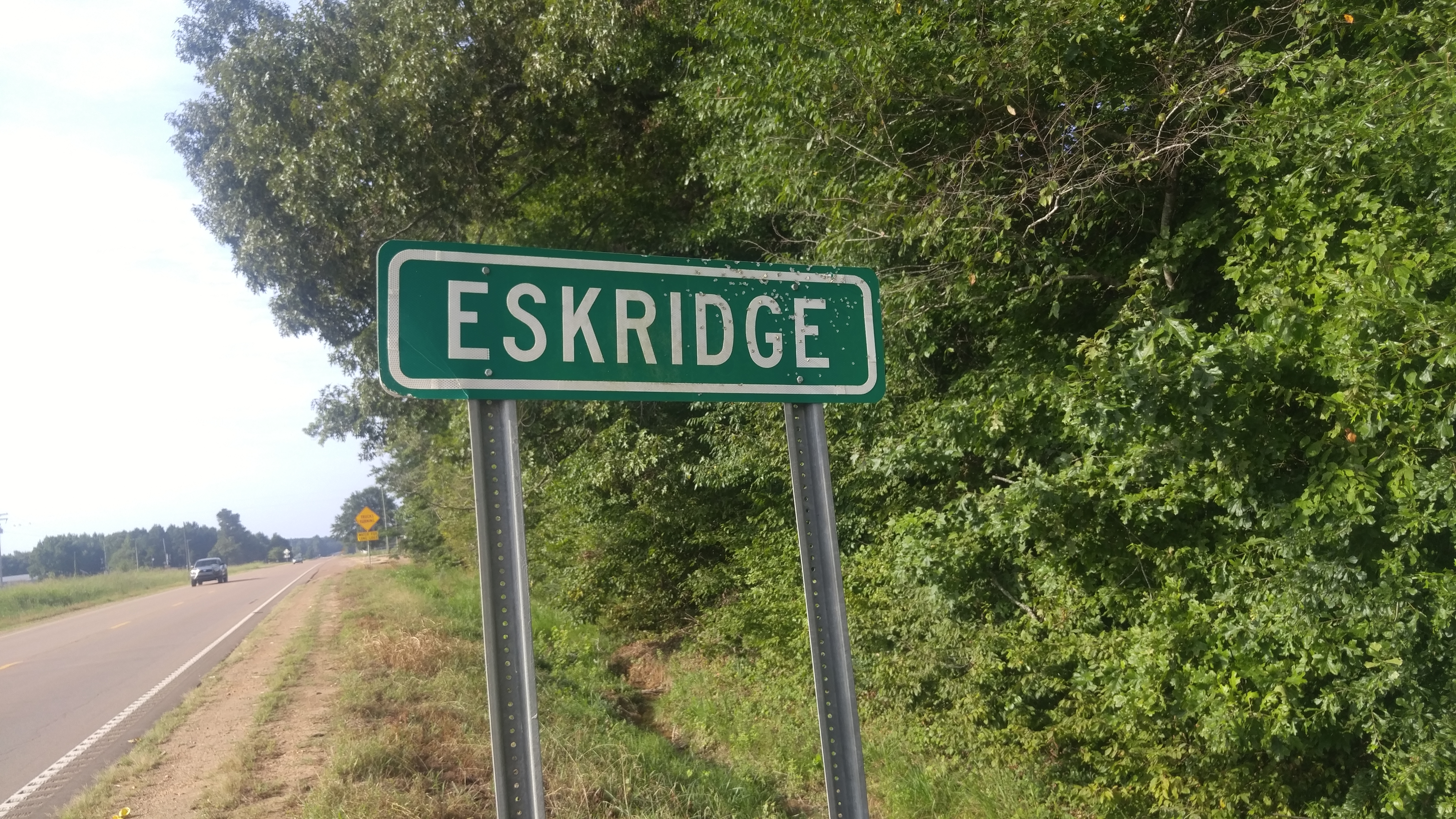
- Highway sign in Eskridge located on US Route 51

- Location within Mississippi Location within the United States
- Coordinates: 33°34′31″N 89°42′03″W
- Country: United States
- State: Mississippi
- County: Montgomery
- Elevation: 300 ft (90 m)
- Time zone: UTC-6 (Central (CST))
  - Summer (DST): UTC-5 (CDT)
- ZIP code: 38925
- Area code: 662
- GNIS feature ID: 669808

Eskridge is an unincorporated community located in Montgomery County, Mississippi, United States, located approximately 4 miles (6.4 km) south of Duck Hill and 6.7 miles (10.8 km) northeast of Winona. Eskridge is located on U.S. Route 51 and the Grenada Railway. A post office operated under the name Eskridge from 1897 to 1927.
