= Stafford Mineral Springs =

- Stafford's Wells Hotel
- U.S. National Register of Historic Places
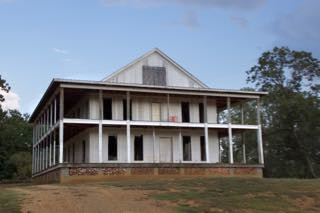

- Location within Mississippi
- Location: MS 1, Winona, Mississippi
- Coordinates: 33°26′27″N 89°43′43″W
- Area: 6 acres (2.4 ha)
- Built: 1890
- Architectural style: Stick/eastlake
- NRHP reference No.: 00001059
- Added to NRHP: September 8, 2000

The Stafford Mineral Springs and Stafford's Wells Hotel are the site of a historic mineral springs hotel resort property in Montgomery County, Mississippi. The property was built in 1890 by Dr. Thomas Washborn and was visited for its supposed curative properties. Prior to 1916 it had well houses, bath houses, guest cottages, a dance pavilion, and gambling hall. The springs were listed on the National Register of Historic Places on September 8, 2000.

== See also ==
- National Register of Historic Places listings in Mississippi
