= Montgomery County, Mississippi =

County in Mississippi, United States

- County
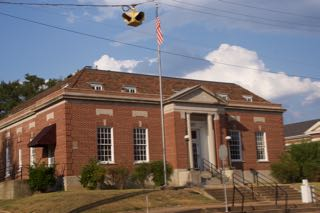
- U.S. Post Office in Winona.

- Location within the U.S. state of Mississippi
- Coordinates: 33°30′N 89°37′W
- Country: United States
- State: Mississippi
- Founded: 1871
- Seat: Winona
- Largest city: Winona

Area
  - Total: 408 sq mi (1,060 km^{2})
  - Land: 407 sq mi (1,050 km^{2})
  - Water: 0.9 sq mi (2.3 km^{2}) 0.2%

Population (2020)
  - Total: 9,822
  - Estimate (2025): 9,354 ▼
  - Density: 24.1/sq mi (9.32/km^{2})
- Time zone: UTC−6 (Central)
  - Summer (DST): UTC−5 (CDT)
- Congressional district: 2nd
- Website: www.montgomerycountyms.com

Montgomery County is a county located in the U.S. state of Mississippi. As of the 2020 United States census, the population was 9,822. Its county seat is Winona.

The county is said to be named in honor either of Richard Montgomery, an American Revolutionary War general killed in 1775 while attempting to capture Quebec City, Canada, or for Montgomery County, Tennessee, from which an early settler came. In the latter case, it would have been indirectly named after John Montgomery, a settler in Montgomery County, Tennessee, who founded the city of Clarksville, Tennessee, in the same county.

The Big Black River passes through the southern part of the county, flowing southwest to its confluence with the Mississippi River south of Vicksburg.

== Geography ==
According to the U.S. Census Bureau, the county has a total area of 408 square miles (1,060 km^{2}), of which 407 square miles (1,050 km^{2}) is land and 0.9 square miles (2.3 km^{2}) (0.2%) is water. It is the fourth-smallest county in Mississippi by total area.

=== Major highways ===
- Interstate 55
- U.S. Route 51
- U.S. Route 82

=== Adjacent counties ===
- Grenada County (north)
- Webster County (northeast)
- Choctaw County (east)
- Attala County (south)
- Carroll County (west)

== History ==
This area was occupied in historic times by the Choctaw people. Their ancestors had inhabited the area for thousands of years. Under the Indian Removal Act of 1830, the United States forced most of the Native Americans west of the Mississippi River in order to open their lands to settlement by European Americans.

Much of the area of present-day Montgomery County was developed for cotton plantations before and after the Civil War, when it was still part of Choctaw County. Most of the labor was supplied by African Americans, enslaved before the war and freed afterward. The county was organized by the legislature in 1871, during the Reconstruction era. The eastern hilly areas became a center of timber industry.

From 1877 to 1950, there were 10 known lynchings of blacks in the county, fewer than in many other counties of the state. It was a form of racial terrorism that was at its height at the turn of the 20th century. Some studies have shown that the rate of lynchings related to economic stresses among whites. Beginning in 1890, Mississippi and other southern states largely excluded blacks from the formal political system by disenfranchisement, creating barriers to voter registration through constitutional amendments and other laws.

On April 13, 1937, two African-American men, Roosevelt Townes and "Bootjack" McDaniels, were arraigned at the county courthouse in Winona, after being charged in the December 1936 murder of a white merchant in Duck Hill, after Townes purportedly confessed to police. They were abducted from the courthouse and lynched. A white crowd estimated at 100 had gathered on April 13. A group of 12 white men took the two blacks by school bus to a site in Duck Hill, where they were tortured to confess before being shot and burned to death. A crowd estimated at 300 to 500 whites gathered to watch. By 1 pm, the wire services and other national media had learned of the event and were trying to gain more information.

The lynchings were reported nationally in the United States and widely condemned. Representative Hatton W. Sumners (D-Texas), chairman of the House Judiciary Committee, sent a telegram to Governor Hugh L. White decrying the lynching. He said, "It is the sort of thing which makes it hard for those of us who are here trying to protect the governmental sovereignty of the state..." At the time a federal anti-lynching bill was under consideration by Congress. It passed the House, but it was defeated in the Senate by the Solid South, conservative white Democrats. As was typical of lynchings, no one was ever prosecuted for the murders. Nazi Germany reported the lynching, comparing it to the "humanism" of its anti-Semitic laws.

As in much of rural Mississippi, population in this county declined markedly from 1910 to 1920, and from 1940 to 1970. The peak of population in the county was in 1910. In addition to labor changes because of mechanization of agriculture, blacks left in two waves of the Great Migration out of the rural and small town South seeking jobs, education, relief from Jim Crow and violence, and better opportunities in other regions. As a result, Mississippi changed from majority black (56%) in population in 1910 to majority white (63%) by 1970.

== Demographics ==
Historical population
Census	Pop.	Note	%±
1880	13,348		—
1890	14,459		8.3%
1900	16,536		14.4%
1910	17,706		7.1%
1920	13,805		−22.0%
1930	15,009		8.7%
1940	15,703		4.6%
1950	14,470		−7.9%
1960	13,320		−7.9%
1970	12,918		−3.0%
1980	13,366		3.5%
1990	12,388		−7.3%
2000	12,189		−1.6%
2010	10,925		−10.4%
2020	9,822		−10.1%
2025 (est.)	9,354	▼	−4.8%
U.S. Decennial Census; 1790-1960 1900-1990; 1990-2000 2010-2013

=== Racial and ethnic composition ===
Montgomery County, Mississippi – Racial and ethnic composition Note: the US Census treats Hispanic/Latino as an ethnic category. This table excludes Latinos from the racial categories and assigns them to a separate category. Hispanics/Latinos may be of any race.
Race / Ethnicity (NH = Non-Hispanic)	Pop 1980	Pop 1990	Pop 2000	Pop 2010	Pop 2020	% 1980	% 1990	% 2000	% 2010	% 2020
White alone (NH)	7,837	6,903	6,570	5,769	5,094	58.63%	55.72%	53.90%	52.81%	51.86%
Black or African American alone (NH)	5,390	5,408	5,437	4,948	4,364	40.33%	43.66%	44.61%	45.29%	44.43%
Native American or Alaska Native alone (NH)	2	11	9	16	9	0.01%	0.09%	0.07%	0.15%	0.09%
Asian alone (NH)	3	16	27	39	24	0.02%	0.13%	0.22%	0.36%	0.24%
Native Hawaiian or Pacific Islander alone (NH)	x	x	3	1	0	x	x	0.02%	0.01%	0.00%
Other race alone (NH)	1	0	1	5	8	0.01%	0.00%	0.01%	0.05%	0.08%
Mixed race or Multiracial (NH)	x	x	39	50	217	x	x	0.32%	0.46%	2.21%
Hispanic or Latino (any race)	133	50	103	97	106	1.00%	0.40%	0.85%	0.89%	1.08%
Total	13,366	12,388	12,189	10,925	9,822	100.00%	100.00%	100.00%	100.00%	100.00%

=== 2020 census ===
As of the 2020 census, the county had a population of 9,822. The median age was 46.4 years. 21.2% of residents were under the age of 18 and 23.2% of residents were 65 years of age or older. For every 100 females there were 89.1 males, and for every 100 females age 18 and over there were 87.1 males age 18 and over.

The racial makeup of the county was 52.1% White, 44.5% Black or African American, 0.1% American Indian and Alaska Native, 0.3% Asian, <0.1% Native Hawaiian and Pacific Islander, 0.6% from some other race, and 2.4% from two or more races. Hispanic or Latino residents of any race comprised 1.1% of the population.

<0.1% of residents lived in urban areas, while 100.0% lived in rural areas.

There were 4,283 households in the county, of which 26.7% had children under the age of 18 living in them. Of all households, 38.5% were married-couple households, 20.2% were households with a male householder and no spouse or partner present, and 37.1% were households with a female householder and no spouse or partner present. About 34.4% of all households were made up of individuals and 18.3% had someone living alone who was 65 years of age or older.

There were 5,193 housing units, of which 17.5% were vacant. Among occupied housing units, 72.3% were owner-occupied and 27.7% were renter-occupied. The homeowner vacancy rate was 1.3% and the rental vacancy rate was 10.8%.

=== 2010 census ===
As of the 2010 United States census, there were 10,925 people living in the county. 53.0% were White, 45.5% Black or African American, 0.4% Asian, 0.1% Native American, 0.5% of some other race and 0.5% of two or more races. 0.9% were Hispanic or Latino (of any race).

=== 2000 census ===
As of the census of 2000, there were 12,189 people, 4,690 households, and 3,367 families living in the county. The population density was 30 people per square mile (12 people/km^{2}). There were 5,402 housing units at an average density of 13 per square mile (5.0/km^{2}). The racial makeup of the county was 54.25% White, 44.95% Black or African American, 0.08% Native American, 0.25% Asian, 0.02% Pacific Islander, 0.07% from other races, and 0.37% from two or more races. 0.85% of the population were Hispanic or Latino of any race.

According to the census of 2000, the largest ancestry groups in Montgomery County were African 44.95%, English 42.1%, and Scots-Irish 1%.

There were 4,690 households, out of which 32.60% had children under the age of 18 living with them, 48.50% were married couples living together, 18.80% had a female householder with no husband present, and 28.20% were non-families. 26.10% of all households were made up of individuals, and 13.60% had someone living alone who was 65 years of age or older. The average household size was 2.57 and the average family size was 3.10.

In the county, the population was spread out, with 26.80% under the age of 18, 8.90% from 18 to 24, 25.30% from 25 to 44, 22.40% from 45 to 64, and 16.70% who were 65 years of age or older. The median age was 37 years. For every 100 females there were 86.40 males. For every 100 females age 18 and over, there were 81.10 males.

The median income for a household in the county was $25,270, and the median income for a family was $31,602. Males had a median income of $26,590 versus $17,639 for females. The per capita income for the county was $14,040. About 21.90% of families and 24.30% of the population were below the poverty line, including 34.80% of those under age 18 and 25.40% of those age 65 or over.

== Education ==
- Public School Districts
  - Winona-Montgomery Consolidated School District - Consolidation of the Winona district and the Montgomery County School District, effective 2018.
- Private Schools
  - Winona Christian School

== Communities ==
=== Cities ===
- Winona (county seat)

=== Towns ===
- Duck Hill
- Kilmichael

=== Census-designated place ===
- Stewart

=== Unincorporated communities ===
- Alva
- Eskridge
- Huntsville
- Lodi
- Poplar Creek
- Silbeyton
- Sweatman

=== Ghost town ===
- Middleton

== Notable residents ==
- Fannie Lou Hamer - Civil rights activist, with the Mississippi Freedom Democratic Party in 1964; born in Montgomery County in 1917, moved to Sunflower County in 1919.

== Politics ==
United States presidential election results for Montgomery County, Mississippi
Year	Republican		Democratic		Third party(ies)	
Year	No.	%	No.	%	No.	%
1912	4	0.54%	697	93.94%	41	5.53%
1916	35	3.31%	997	94.41%	24	2.27%
1920	57	6.22%	846	92.26%	14	1.53%
1924	60	5.13%	1,015	86.75%	95	8.12%
1928	98	5.75%	1,607	94.25%	0	0.00%
1932	17	1.23%	1,366	98.70%	1	0.07%
1936	5	0.36%	1,383	99.64%	0	0.00%
1940	44	2.83%	1,509	97.10%	1	0.06%
1944	74	5.12%	1,371	94.88%	0	0.00%
1948	35	2.04%	105	6.13%	1,574	91.83%
1952	840	38.25%	1,356	61.75%	0	0.00%
1956	278	15.63%	1,134	63.74%	367	20.63%
1960	585	29.71%	623	31.64%	761	38.65%
1964	3,181	95.53%	149	4.47%	0	0.00%
1968	475	10.90%	896	20.56%	2,988	68.55%
1972	3,210	76.32%	925	21.99%	71	1.69%
1976	2,278	47.19%	2,410	49.93%	139	2.88%
1980	2,479	46.55%	2,730	51.26%	117	2.20%
1984	3,093	62.07%	1,881	37.75%	9	0.18%
1988	2,504	56.79%	1,893	42.93%	12	0.27%
1992	2,324	48.66%	2,076	43.47%	376	7.87%
1996	1,943	47.15%	1,970	47.80%	208	5.05%
2000	2,630	54.24%	2,187	45.10%	32	0.66%
2004	3,002	54.62%	2,473	45.00%	21	0.38%
2008	3,071	53.76%	2,609	45.68%	32	0.56%
2012	2,947	52.21%	2,675	47.39%	23	0.41%
2016	2,818	56.41%	2,115	42.33%	63	1.26%
2020	2,917	57.48%	2,121	41.79%	37	0.73%
2024	2,658	60.08%	1,737	39.26%	29	0.66%

== See also ==
- National Register of Historic Places listings in Montgomery County, Mississippi
